= Roissy Est bus network =

Bus network in France

Roissy Est
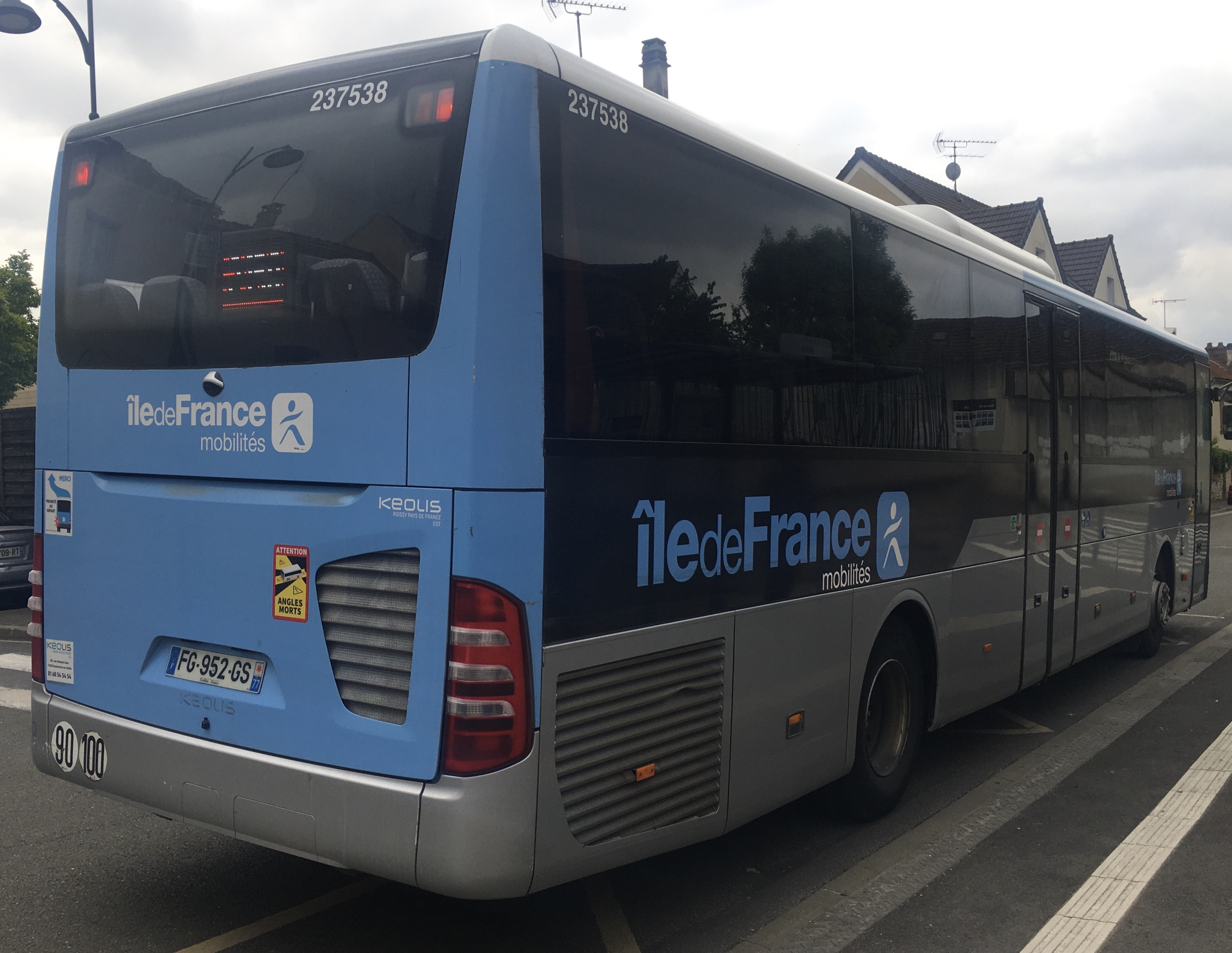
- A Mercedes-Benz Intouro II M n°237538 of line 2150 at Mairie de Juilly, Juilly.
- Parent: Île-de-France Mobilités
- Founded: August 1, 2023
- Locale: Communauté d'agglomération Roissy Pays de France
- Service area: Île-de-France; Seine-et-Marne: (Annet-sur-Marne, Charmentray, Charny, Claye-Souilly, Compans, Crégy-lès-Meaux, Cuisy, Dammartin-en-Goële, Fresnes-sur-Marne, Forfry, Gesvres-le-Chapitre, Gressy, Iverny, Juilly, Longperrier, Marchémoret, Mauregard, Meaux, Messy, Le Mesnil-Amelot, Mitry-Mory, Montgé-en-Goële, Monthyon, Moussy-le-Neuf, Moussy-le-Vieux, Nantouillet, Oissery, Othis, Penchard, Le Pin, Le Plessis-aux-Bois, Le Plessis-l'Évêque, Précy-sur-Marne, Rouvres, Saint-Mard, Saint-Mesmes, Saint-Pathus, Saint-Soupplets, Thieux, Trilbardou, Vaujours, Vémars, Villeron, Villeneuve-sous-Dammartin, Villenoy, Villeparisis, Villevaudé, Vinantes); Seine-Saint-Denis: (Bondy, Tremblay-en-France); Val-d'Oise: (Louvres); Hauts-de-France; Oise: (Lagny-le-Sec, Mortefontaine, Le Plessis-Belleville)
- Routes: 2101 2102 2103 2104 2107; 2108 2109 2110 2111 2113; 2116 2117 2118 2119 2120; 2121 2122 2123 2124 2127; 2128 2129 2130 2150 2151; 2152 2153 2154 2155 2156; 2157 2158 2159 2160 2161; 2162 2163 2164 2165 2166; 2168 2169 2171 2176
- Operator: Keolis (Keolis Roissy Pays de France Est)
- Website: Roissy Est website

Roissy Est is a French bus network run by Île-de-France Mobilités, operated by Keolis through his subsidiary Keolis Roissy Pays de France Est from August 1, 2023.

It consists of 47 lines serving the Communauté d'agglomération Roissy Pays de France. The network is also completed with a demand-responsive transport.

== History ==
=== Network development ===
==== Opening to the competition ====
Following the opening of public transport to competition in Île-de-France, the Roissy Est bus network was created on August 1, 2023, corresponding to public service delegation number 8 established by Île-de-France Mobilités. An invitation to tender was therefore launched by the organizing authority in order to designate the company who will operate the network for a period of 7 years. It is finally Keolis, via his society Keolis Roissy Pays de France Est, who was designated during the board of directors on March 6, 2023.

At the date of its opening to competition, the network consisted of lines 3A, 16, 17, 18, 19, 21, 22, 23, 24, 71, 116 and 171 and the Goëlys network with lines 701, 702, 703, 704, 705, 707, 708, 709, 710, 711, 749, 751, 753, 755 and 756 operated by Keolis CIF and lines 8, 9, 12, 17, 18 and 19 operated by Transdev Trans Val de France.

On August 1, 2023, the line 3A was simplified and renamed line 3.

On August 28, 2023, the network is restructured, particularly regarding school services: line 712 replaces the school services of lines 710 and 711, line 713 replaces the school services of lines 703, 705 and 753, line 714 is created, line 715 replaces lines 715 and 755, line 756 becomes 716 and line 749 becomes 719; on the side of regular lines, lines 703 and 705 merge and the offer of lines 9, 12, 17, 21, 22, 23, 701, 702, 711 is reviewed.

==== Network renaming ====
Since August 28, 2023, the network is one of the first to apply the new principle of unique regional numbering planned by Île-de-France Mobilités, removing duplicates. The correspondence between old and new numbers is as follows:

Network renaming
| Old | New |
|---|---|
| 701 | 2101 |
| 702 | 2102 |
| 703 | 2103 |
| 704 | 2104 |
| 707 | 2107 |
| 708 | 2108 |
| 709 | 2109 |
| 710 | 2110 |
| 711 | 2111 |
| 3 | 2113 |
| 16 | 2116 |
| 17 | 2117; 2130 |
| 18 | 2118; 2120 |
| 19 | 2119; 2169 |
| 21 | 2121 |
| 22 | 2122 |
| 23 | 2123 |
| 24 | 2124 |
| 71 | 2127 |
| 8 | 2128 |
| 9 | 2129 |
| 712A | 2150 |
| 712B | 2151 |
| 712C | 2152 |
| 712D | 2153 |
| 712E | 2154 |
| 713A | 2155 |
| 713B | 2156 |
| 713C | 2157 |
| 714A | 2158 |
| 714B | 2159 |
| 714C | 2160 |
| 715A | 2161 |
| 715B | 2162 |
| 716 | 2163 |
| 719A; 719B | 2164 |
| 719C | 2165 |
| 719D | 2166 |
| 12 | 2168 |
| 171 | 2171 |
| 116 | 2176 |

== Routes ==
=== Main routes ===
| Image | Line | First direction | Second direction |
|---|---|---|---|
| | 2101 | Roissypôle | Othis — Beaupré; Othis — Saint-Laurent; Moussy-le-Neuf — La Fortelle |
| | 2102 | Roissypôle | Gare de Louvres |
| | 2103 | Gare de Dammartin - Juilly - Saint-Mard | Saint-Pathus — Les Frênes |
| | 2104 | Gare de Meaux | Saint-Pathus — Les Frênes |
| | 2107 | Gare de Dammartin - Juilly - Saint-Mard | Longperrier — Lycée Charles-de-Gaulle; Saint-Mard — Collège Georges-Brassens; Rouvres — Église |
| | 2108 | Gare de Dammartin - Juilly - Saint-Mard | Othis — Beaupré; Saint-Mard — Collège George-Brassens |
| | 2109 | Gare de Dammartin - Juilly - Saint-Mard | Dammartin-en-Goële — Centre médical |
| | 2110 | Gare de Dammartin - Juilly - Saint-Mard | Juilly — Rue Barre; Le Plessis-l'Évêque — Église |
| | 2111 | Gare de Dammartin - Juilly - Saint-Mard | Moussy-le-Neuf — La Fortelle |
| | 2113 | Gare de Mitry-Claye | Compans — Saint-Exupéry |
| | 2116 | Gare de Mitry-Claye | Gare de Villeparisis - Mitry-le-Neuf; Compans — Maison des Associations |
| | 2117 | Gare de Villeparisis - Mitry-le-Neuf — Place Jacques-Chirac (circular line) | |
| | 2118 | Gare de Villeparisis - Mitry-le-Neuf — Place Jacques-Chirac | Villeparisis — Collège Gérard Philippe |
| | 2119 | Gare de Villeparisis - Mitry-le-Neuf — Place Jacques-Chirac | Le Pin — Clos Marchais |
| | 2120 | Gare de Mitry-Claye | Claye-Souilly – Cimetière |
| | 2121 | Gare de Villeparisis - Mitry-le-Neuf — Place Jacques-Chirac | Claye-Souilly — Shopping Promenade |
| | 2122 | Vaujours — Institut Fénelon; Gare de Villeparisis - Mitry-le-Neuf; Gare de Mitry-Claye | Gare de Dammartin - Juilly - Saint-Mard; Longperrier — Lycée Charles-de-Gaulle |
| | 2123 | Roissypôle | Villeparisis — Collège Gérard Philippe |
| | 2124 | Roissypôle | Compans — Maisons des Associations |
| | 2127 | Gare de Villeparisis - Mitry-le-Neuf (circular line) | |
| | 2128 | Gare de Bondy | Claye-Souilly – Mairie; Claye-Souilly — Église |
| | 2129 | Gare de Mitry-Claye | Gare de Meaux |
| | 2130 | Gare de Mitry-Claye | Gare routière de Charny |
| | 2150 | Longperrier — Lycée Charles-de-Gaulle | Le Plessis-l'Évêque — Église |
| | 2151 | Saint-Mard — Collège Georges-Brassens | Villeroy – Centre |
| | 2152 | Saint-Mard — Collège Georges-Brassens | Le Plessis-l'Évêque — Église |
| | 2153 | Gare de Meaux; Meaux — Henri IV | Gare de Dammartin - Juilly - Saint-Mard |
| | 2154 | Gare de Meaux; Meaux — Henri IV | Gare de Dammartin - Juilly - Saint-Mard |
| | 2155 | Saint-Soupplets — Collège Nicolas Tronchon | Marchémoret — Lessart |
| | 2156 | Dammartin-en-Goële – Lycée Charlotte Delbo | Saint-Pathus — Les Frênes |
| | 2157 | Oissery – Collège Jean des Barres | Saint-Pathus — Haute Garenne/Les Frênes |
| | 2158 | Meaux — Lycée Pierre de Coubertin; Meaux – Henri IV | Saint-Pathus — Les Frênes; Le Plessis-Belleville – Mairie (Oise, Hauts-de-France) |
| | 2159 | Meaux — Lycée Jean Vilar | Oissery – Rue de Condé; Saint-Pathus — Les Frênes |
| | 2160 | Saint-Soupplets — Collège Nicolas Tronchon | Crégy-lès-Meaux — Le Blamont |
| | 2161 | Saint-Mard — Collège Georges-Brassens | Thieux – Centre; Mairie de Mauregard – Mairie |
| | 2162 | Longperrier — Lycée Charles-de-Gaulle | Mauregard – Mairie |
| | 2163 | Juilly – Église Saint-Étienne | Moussy-le-Neuf – Les Échabots |
| | 2164 | Mortefontaine (Oise, Hauts-de-France) — Institut Saint-Dominique | Othis — Saint-Laurent; Dammartin-en-Goële — Collège de l'Europe |
| | 2165 | Mortefontaine (Oise, Hauts-de-France) — Institut Saint-Dominique | Othis — La Jalaise |
| | 2166 | Mortefontaine (Oise, Hauts-de-France) — Institut Saint-Dominique | Saint-Soupplets – Église |
| | 2168 | Mitry-Mory — Collège Paul Langevin / Lycée Honoré de Balzac; Claye-Souilly – Mairie | Claye-Souilly — Bois-Fleuri |
| | 2169 | Claye-Souilly – Mairie | Charny – Gare routière |
| | 2171 | Gare de Villeparisis - Mitry-le-Neuf | Mitry-Mory — Collège Erik Satie |
| | 2176 | Mitry-Mory — Collège Paul Langevin / Lycée Honoré de Balzac; Claye-Souilly – Mairie | Mitry-Mory — La Villette aux Aulnes |

=== Night routes ===
The network is also completed with three night lines named Soirée Mitry - Claye, Soirée Mitry-le-Neuf and Soirée Villeparisis.

| Image | Line |
|---|---|
| | Soirée Mitry-Claye |
| | Soirée Mitry-le-Neuf |
| | Soirée Villeparisis |

=== Demand-responsive transport ===
The network also operate a demand-responsive transport named TAD Goële.

| Image | Line |
|---|---|
| | TàD Goële |

== See also ==
- Île-de-France Mobilités
