= Communauté de communes du Pays de la Goële et du Multien =

Coordinates: 49.0539°N 2.6835°E

Pays de la Goële et le Multien
- Former communauté de communes
- Country: France
- Region: Île-de-France
- Department: Seine-et-Marne
- No. of communes: {{{nbcomm}}}
- Established: 1973
- Disbanded: 2013
- Area: 100.56 km^{2} (38.83 sq mi)
- Population (1999): 26,394
  - Density: 262.47/km^{2} (679.79/sq mi)

The Communauté de communes du Pays de la Goële et du Multien (acronym: PGM) is a former federation of municipalities (communauté de communes) in the Seine-et-Marne département and in the Île-de-France région of France. It was created in June 1973. It was merged into the new Communauté de communes Plaines et Monts de France in January 2013.

Before 2007, it was named "Communauté de communes de Dammartin-en-Goële".

== Composition ==
The Communauté de communes comprised the following communes:

- Cuisy
- Dammartin-en-Goële
- Longperrier
- Marchémoret
- Montgé-en-Goële
- Moussy-le-Neuf
- Oissery
- Le Plessis-l'Évêque
- Saint-Mard
- Saint-Pathus
- Thieux
- Villeneuve-sous-Dammartin

== See also ==
- Communes of the Seine-et-Marne department
