= Vert-Galant station =

Railway station in Villepinte, France

Vert Galant
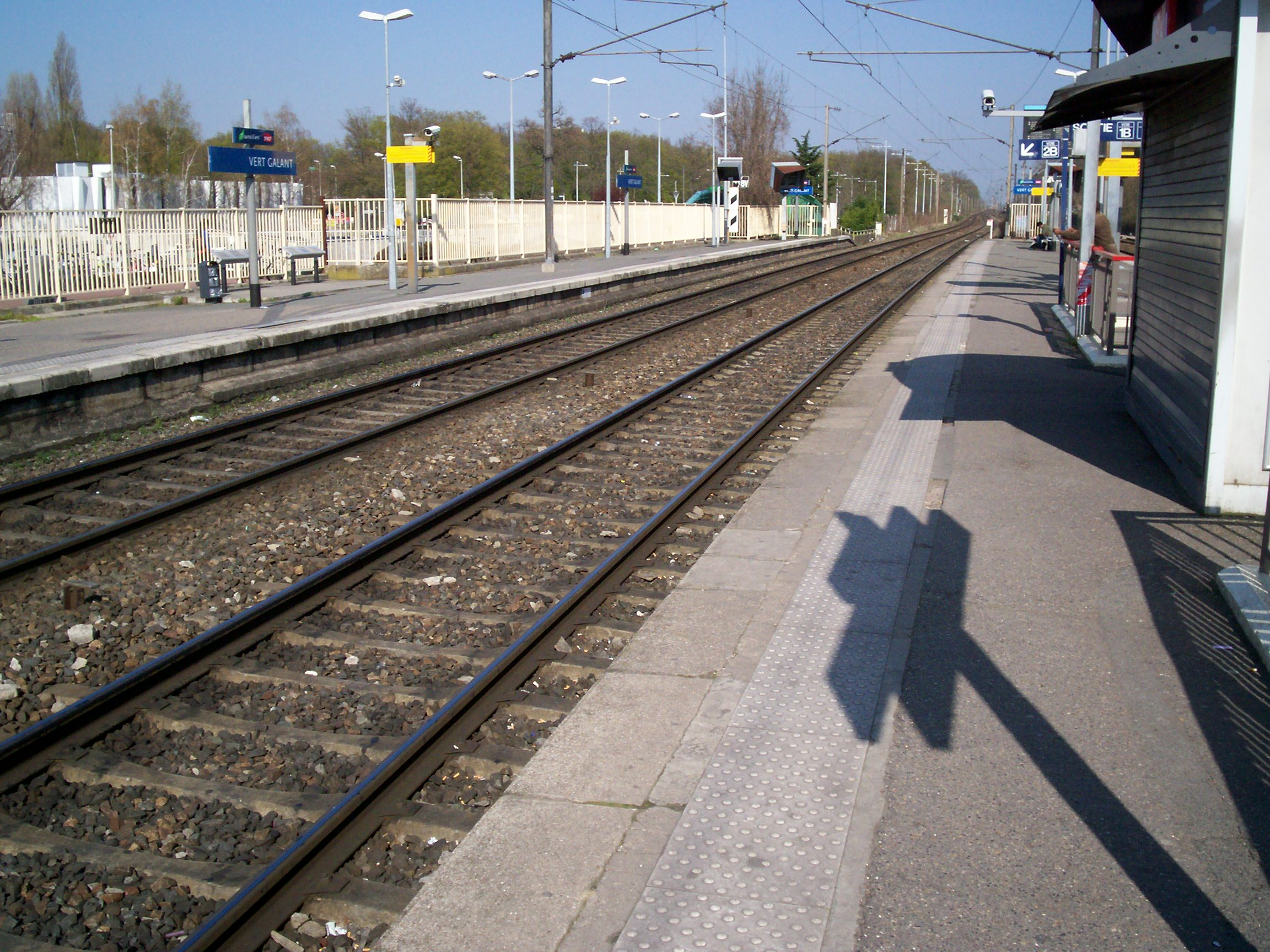
- Vert-Galant station platforms

General information
- Location: Place de la Gare; Villepinte; France
- Coordinates: 48.944167°N 2.566944°E
- Operator: SNCF

Construction
- Accessible: Yes, by prior reservation

Other information
- Station code: 87271437
- Fare zone: 4

Passengers
- 2024: 7,454,392

Services
Preceding station	RER	Following station
Villeparisis–Mitry-le-Neuf towards Mitry–Claye	RER B	Sevran – Livry towards Robinson or Saint-Rémy-lès-Chevreuse
Location

Vert-Galant (French pronunciation: [vɛʁ ɡalɑ̃]) is an RER station in Villepinte, Seine-Saint-Denis, a northeastern suburb of Paris. It is on RER B between Villeparisis – Mitry-le-Neuf and Sevran–Livry.
