= Sevran–Livry station =

Railway station in Paris, France

Sevran–Livry
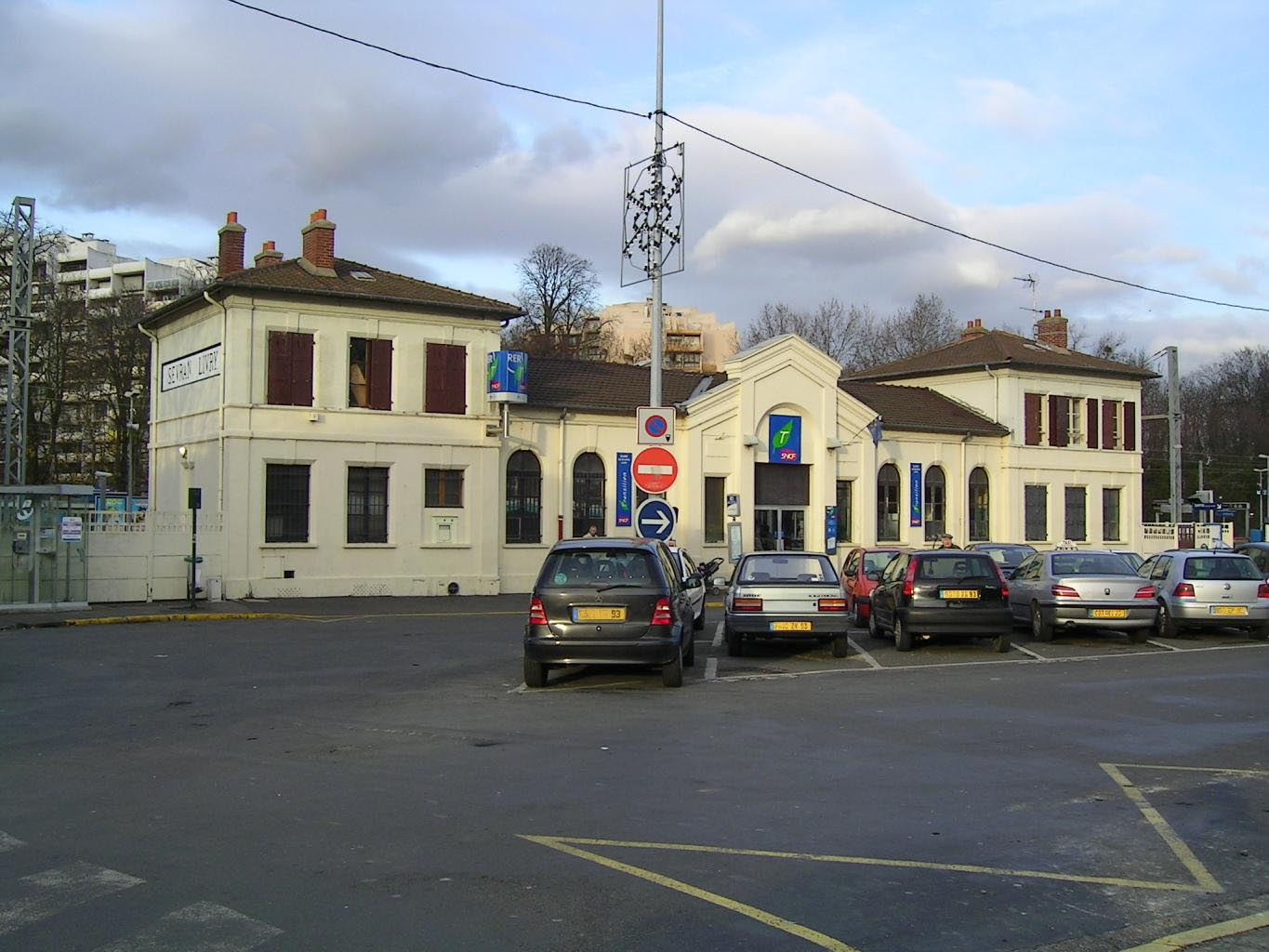
- Sevran–Livry station house

General information
- Location: France
- Coordinates: 48.9361°N 2.5342°E
- Operator: SNCF

Construction
- Accessible: Yes, by prior reservation

Other information
- Station code: 87271429
- Fare zone: 4

Passengers
- 2024: 6,376,238

Services
Preceding station	RER	Following station
Vert-Galant towards Mitry–Claye	RER B	Aulnay-sous-Bois towards Robinson or Saint-Rémy-lès-Chevreuse
Future services
Preceding station	Paris Metro	Following station
Sevran Beaudottes towards Saint-Denis–Pleyel	Line 16 (2026)	Clichy–Montfermeil Terminus
Location

Sevran–Livry station is an RER B station in Sevran and near Livry-Gargan, a northerly suburb of Paris, in Seine-Saint-Denis department, France. It is situated on the RER B suburban railway line. It will also be a station for Paris Metro Line 16 in the future.
