= Meaux station =

Railway station in Meaux, France

Coordinates: 48°57′29″N 2°52′25″E

Meaux
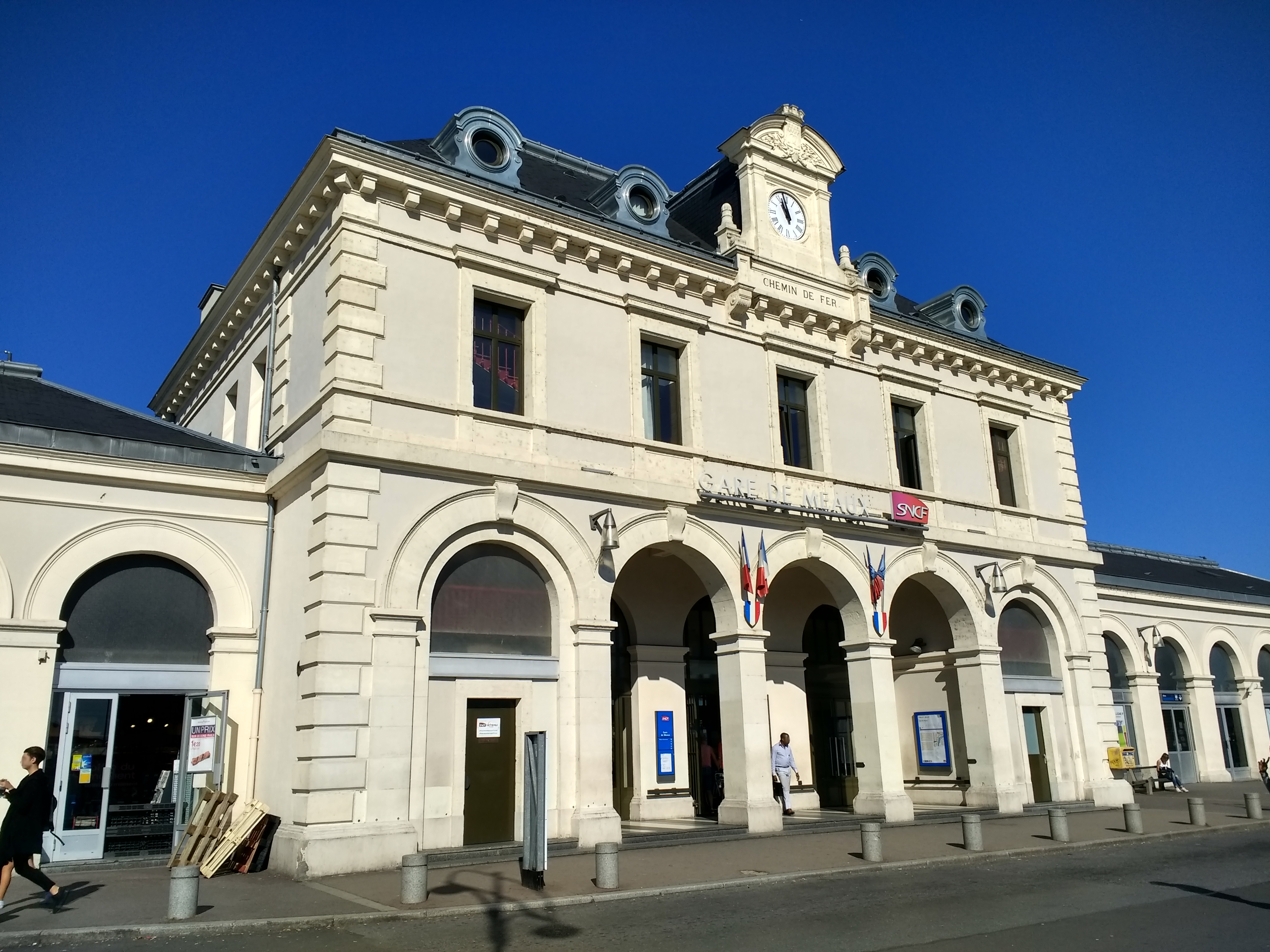
- Meaux station building

General information
- Location: Place de la Gare; Meaux; France
- Elevation: 52 m (171 ft)
- Operator: SNCF
- Line: Paris-Est–Strasbourg-Ville railway

Construction
- Accessible: No

Other information
- Station code: 87116103
- Fare zone: 5

History
- Opened: 5 July 1849

Passengers
- 2024: 10,375,161

Services
Preceding station	Transilien	Following station
Esbly towards Paris-Est	Line P	Terminus
Paris-Est Terminus	Line P	Trilport towards Château-Thierry or La Ferté-Milon
Location

Meaux station (French: Gare de Meaux) is a railway station serving Meaux, Seine-et-Marne department, northern France. It is on the Paris–Strasbourg railway, and offers connections to Paris-Est, Château-Thierry and La Ferté-Milon.

The rail line connecting Paris to Meaux was established in 1849. The nowadays SNCF train station, still in use, was built in 1890.

== Train services ==
Train services go:
Towards Paris Gare de l'Est: 2 to 4 trains per hour
Towards Château-Thierry 1 or 2 trains per hour
Towards La Ferté-Milon 1 or 2 trains per hour

== Bus services ==
Alongside the Meaux train station there is also the main bus station in the city, with more than 30 bus lines serving the whole eastern metropolitan area of the Paris agglomeration.

- Roissy Est: 2104 2111 2128 2129
- Noctilien: N141

== Future ==
In the future, Meaux will be the terminus for RER E, which now is Chelles. This gives Meaux a direct connection towards downtown Paris, via the Magenta and the Haussmann–Saint-Lazare stations.
