= Henri Buguet =

French painter

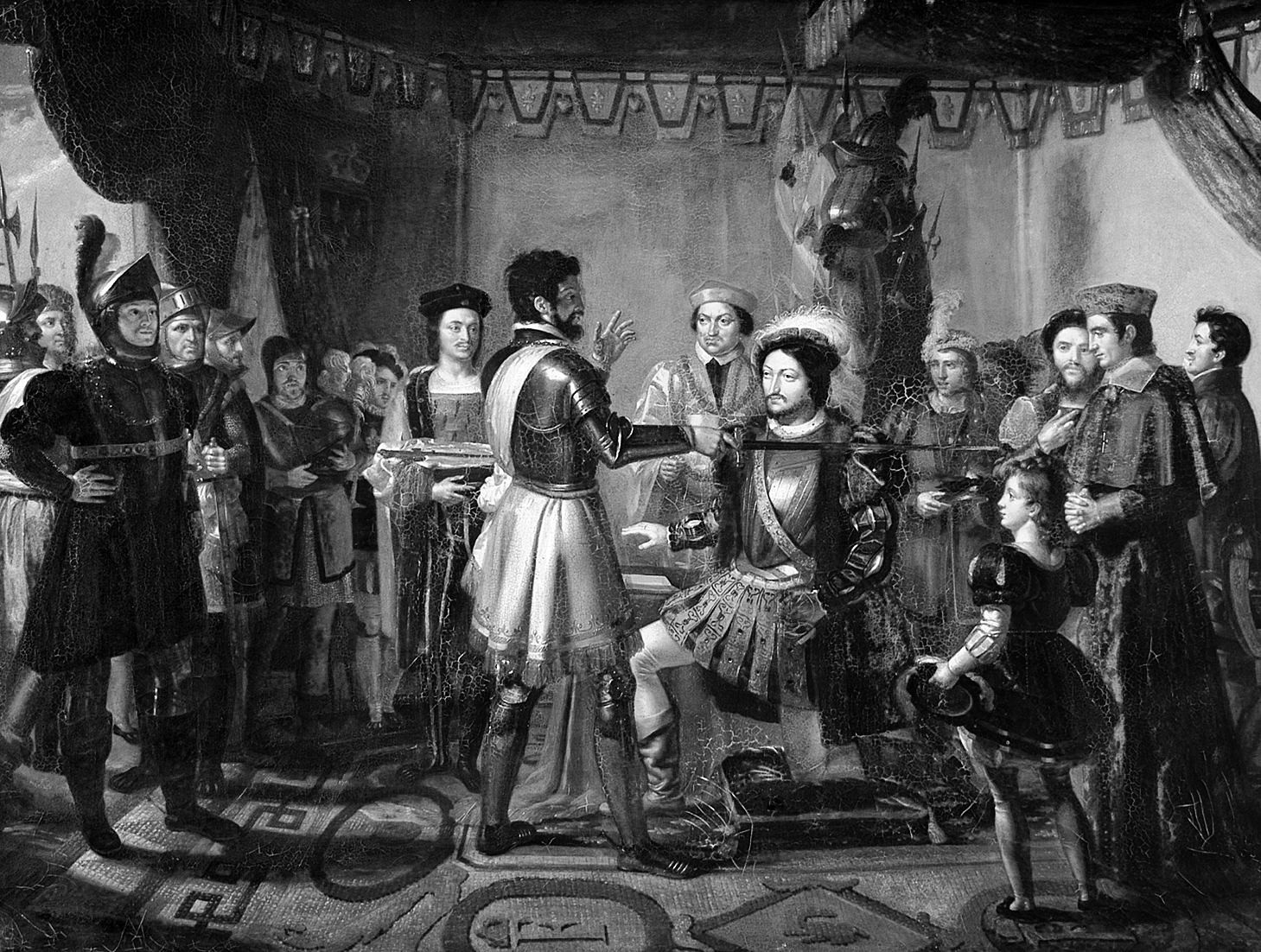
Henri Buguet, Francis being knighted by Bayard, oil on panel. Musée des Beaux-Arts in Pau, France

Henri Buguet (1761 – ca. 1833) was a French historical and portrait painter born at Fresne (Seine-et-Marne). He was a pupil of David, and painted in 1817 for the château of Pau 'Francis I. knighted by Bayard.' His portraits of Louis XVIII and Charles X have been engraved by Bertrand. He died in Paris.
