= Hôtel de Ville, Villepinte =

Town hall in Villepinte, France

Hôtel de Ville
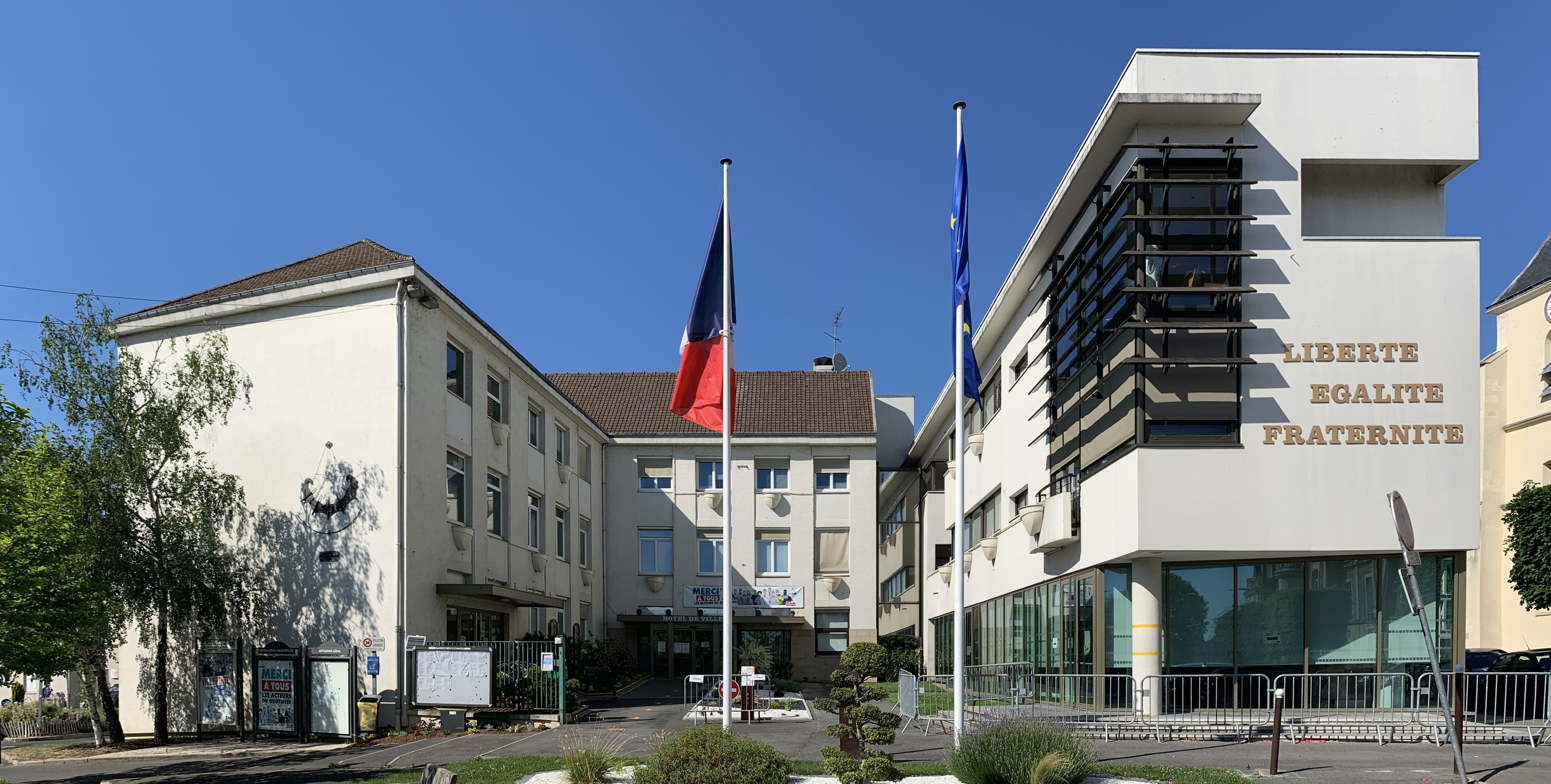
- The main frontage of the Hôtel de Ville in May 2020
- Interactive map of the Hôtel de Ville area

General information
- Type: City hall
- Architectural style: Modern style
- Location: Villepinte, France
- Coordinates: 48.9638°N 2.5348°E
- Completed: 1996

Design and construction
- Architects: Renaud Vignaud & Associés

The Hôtel de Ville (French pronunciation: [otɛl də vil], City Hall) is a municipal building in Villepinte, Seine-Saint-Denis, in the northeastern suburbs of Paris, standing on Place de l'Hôtel de Ville.

== History ==
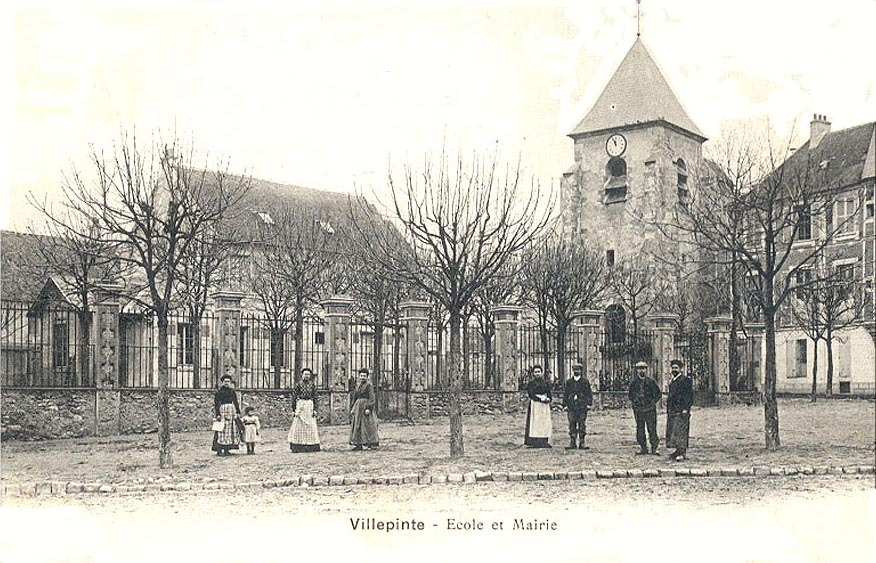
The old town hall (on the left)

Following the French Revolution, the town council initially met at the home of the mayor at the time. This arrangement continued until the 1840s, when the council decided to commission a combined town hall and school. The site they selected was on the south side of the Rue de l'Église, just to the west of the Church of Notre-Dame. The council acquired the site from Messieurs Redant, Dumont and Tétard for Fr7,000.

The new building was designed in the neoclassical style, built in brick with a stucco finish and was completed in 1848. The design involved a symmetrical main frontage of five bays facing onto what is now Place de l'Hôtel de Ville. The central bay featured a square headed doorway. The other bays on the ground floor and all the bays on the first floor were fenestrated by casement windows with shutters. Internally, the mayor's office was on the first floor, and the classroom and the accommodation of the teacher, who also served as town clerk, were on the first floor.

The council bought two houses to the west of the original building in 1884, so allowing a covered playground and a gymnasium to be created around a courtyard. This arrangement continued until the early 1930s, when the École du Centre and then the École de la Plaine opened in the Vert-Galant district, rendering the school on the ground floor of the town hall redundant in 1932.

During the Paris insurrection, part of the Second World War, elements of the French Forces of the Interior burst into the town hall, a few days before the official liberation of the town by American troops on 29 August 1944.

Following significant population growth, an L-shaped four-storey extension was erected on the west part of the site, projected forward from the left-hand side of the old town hall, and completed in 1971.

In December 1995, the council led by the mayor, Jean-Claude Mejsak, decided to demolish the original building and to erect a new extension on the east part of the site, establishing symmetry with the 1970s extension. This gave the complex a U-shaped appearance around the courtyard. This extension was designed by Renaud Vignaud & Associés in the modern style, built in concrete and glass and was completed in 1996. Internally, the principal new rooms were the Salle des Mariages (wedding room) and the Magasin d'Archives (archives store).
