= Hôtel de Ville, Villeparisis =

Town hall in Villeparisis, France

Hôtel de Ville
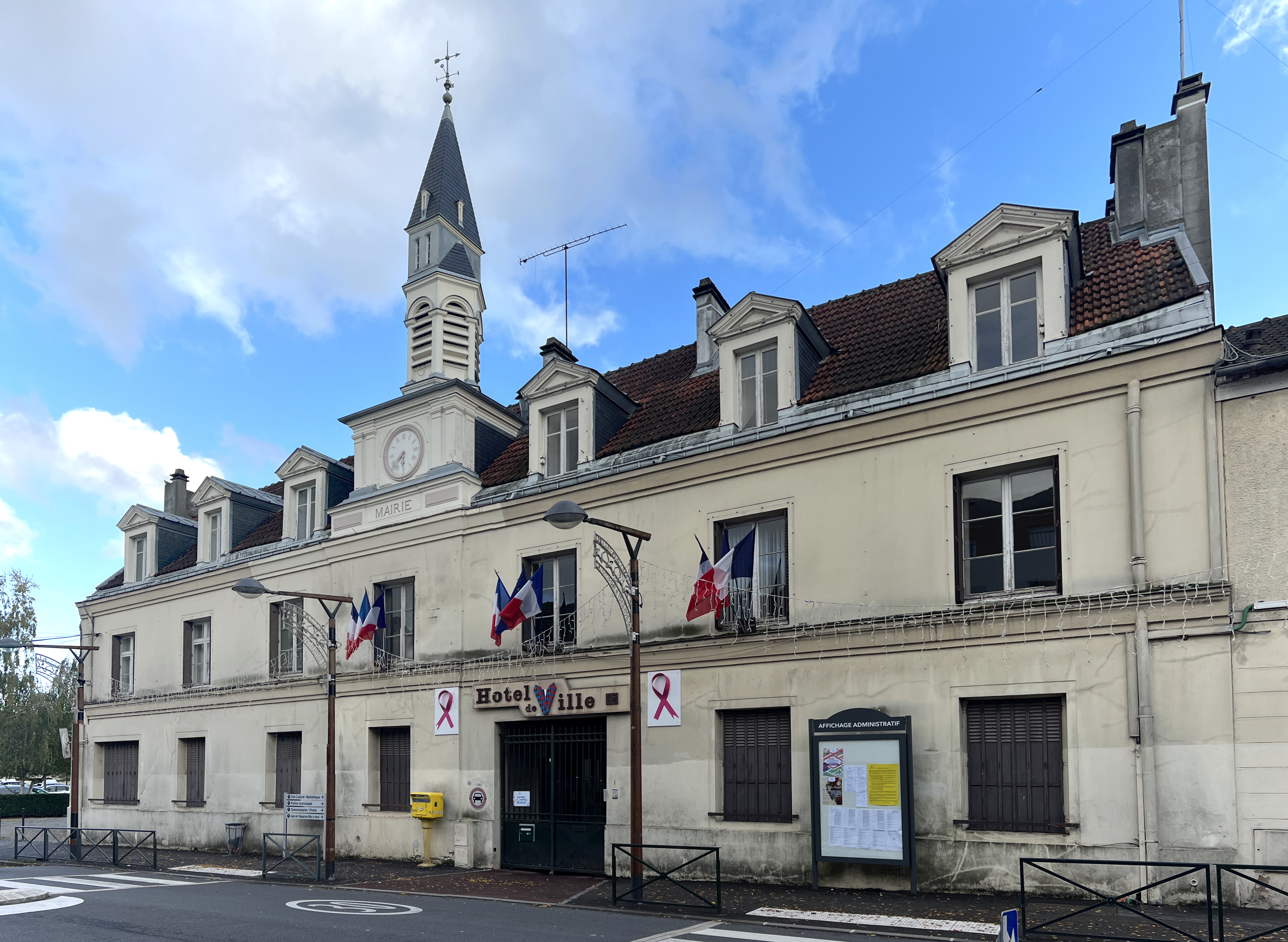
- The main frontage of the Hôtel de Ville in October 2023
- Interactive map of the Hôtel de Ville area

General information
- Type: City hall
- Architectural style: Neoclassical style
- Location: Villeparisis, France
- Coordinates: 48.9399°N 2.6171°E
- Completed: 1750

The Hôtel de Ville (French pronunciation: [otɛl də vil], City Hall) is a municipal building in Villeparisis, Seine-et-Marne, in the northeastern suburbs of Paris, standing on Rue de Ruzé.

== History ==
After the French Revolution, the town council initially met at the house of the mayor at the time. This arrangement continued until 1862, when the council led by the mayor, Charles-Auguste Foacier de Ruzé, decided to establish a combined town hall and school. The building they used for this purpose was a single-storey structure in a courtyard behind a coaching inn known as the "Grand Monarque" (Grand Monarch) on the south side of what is now Rue de Ruzé.

De Ruzé died in 1881 and left a significant sum of money to the council for the benefit of the town. This money was used to acquire those parts of the former coaching inn complex that the council did not already own. The main building had been commissioned to accommodate coaching parties travelling on the "Route Royale d'Allemagne" (Royal Route to Germany). It had been designed in the neoclassical style, built in ashlar stone and had been completed in 1750. Following the opening of the Ourcq Canal in 1822 and the completion of the Chemin de Fer du Nord line from Paris to Soissons in 1862, road traffic on the "Route Royale d'Allemagne" began to decline and the coaching inn closed.

The design involved a near-symmetrical main frontage of seven bays facing onto the street. The central bay originally featured a round-headed doorway with voussoirs and a keystone on the ground floor and a casement window with a stone surround and a keystone on the first floor. The central bay was flanked by pairs of Doric order pilasters supporting an entablature, a clock and an octagonal belfry with a spire. The first and fourth bays contained carriage entrances allowing stagecoaches to access the courtyard and stables behind. The other bays were fenestrated with casement windows with stone surrounds and keystones on the first two floors and by dormer windows at attic level.

After the École Élémentaire Ernest Renan opened in August 1966, and the Collège Gérard Philipe was established a few years later, the building was used exclusively for municipal purposes. The former classrooms were converted to create the Salle des Mariages (wedding room) and the Salle du Conseil (council chamber). The complex was remodelled internally between December 2015 and March 2016 to create a new reception area for customers as well as private consultation rooms.
