= Hôtel de Ville, Mitry-Mory =

Town hall in Mitry-Mory, France

Hôtel de Ville
- The main frontage of the Hôtel de Ville in September 2025

General information
- Type: City hall
- Architectural style: Modern style
- Location: Mitry-Mory, France
- Coordinates: 48.9837°N 2.6191°E
- Completed: 1936

The Hôtel de Ville (French pronunciation: [otɛl də vil], City Hall) is a municipal building in Mitry-Mory, Seine-et-Marne, in the northeastern suburbs of Paris, standing on Rue Paul Vaillant-Couturier.

== History ==
The second town hall

After the French Revolution, the new town council of Mitry initially met in the great hall of the local hospital, the Hôtel-Dieu, in the town square (now Place de la République). After the communes of Mitry and Mory were amalgamated to form Mitry-Mory in 1839, the enlarged council decided to purchase a house on the west side of Place de l'Église, opposite the Church of Saint-Martin, and completed this transaction in 1841. This building, known as the Maison Commune, served as the first town hall for over 70 years and later operated as a police station until it became so dilapidated that it had to be demolished in 1974.

A bust of Marianne was cast in bronze by the sculptor, René-Philéas Carillon, and installed on a pedestal in front of the old Hôtel-Dieu in 1903. It was seized and melted down by the Vichy regime during the Second World War, but replaced by a new bust created by the sculptor, Roger-Louis Chavanon, to celebrate the bicentenary of the Battle of Valmy in September 1992.

In around 1911, the council led by the mayor, Paul-Charles Le Coursonnois, decided to acquire the old Hôtel-Dieu, to demolish it and to erect a purpose-built town hall on the same site. This building, the second town hall, was designed in the neoclassical style, built in ashlar stone and was completed in 1913. The design involved a symmetrical main frontage of three bays facing onto the square. The central bay featured a square-headed doorway with a curved pediment on the ground floor, a bi-partite window with a curved pediment on the first floor, and a tall pediment containing an oculus at roof level. The outer bays were fenestrated by casement windows on both floors. The pediment above the first-floor window was decorated with a mosaic displaying the dates 1698 and 1887, celebrating the founding of the Hôtel-Dieu by the Bishop of Meaux, Jacques-Bénigne Bossuet, and the subsequent long period of service by the nuns of the Sisters of Charity caring for the people of the town. After it was no longer required for municipal use, the second town hall served as the local post office.

In May 1933, following significant population growth, the council led by the mayor, Marcel Chevremont, decided to acquire a more substantial property to serve as the third town hall. The building they selected was the Villa Magdelin on what is now Rue Paul Vaillant-Couturier. The house had probably been commissioned in the 19th century and had subsequently served as the home of the Magdelin family. The design involved a symmetrical main frontage of five bays facing onto the street. There was a doorway in the central bay and the remainder of the building was fenestrated by casement windows. After the last member of the family, Pierre Magdelin, died in May 1930, it was acquired by the council. Following completion of major programme of works to remodel the building for municipal purposes, it was officially reopened as the third town hall on 12 April 1936.
