= Villeparisis–Mitry-le-Neuf station =

Railway station in Mitry-Mory, France

Villeparisis Mitry le Neuf
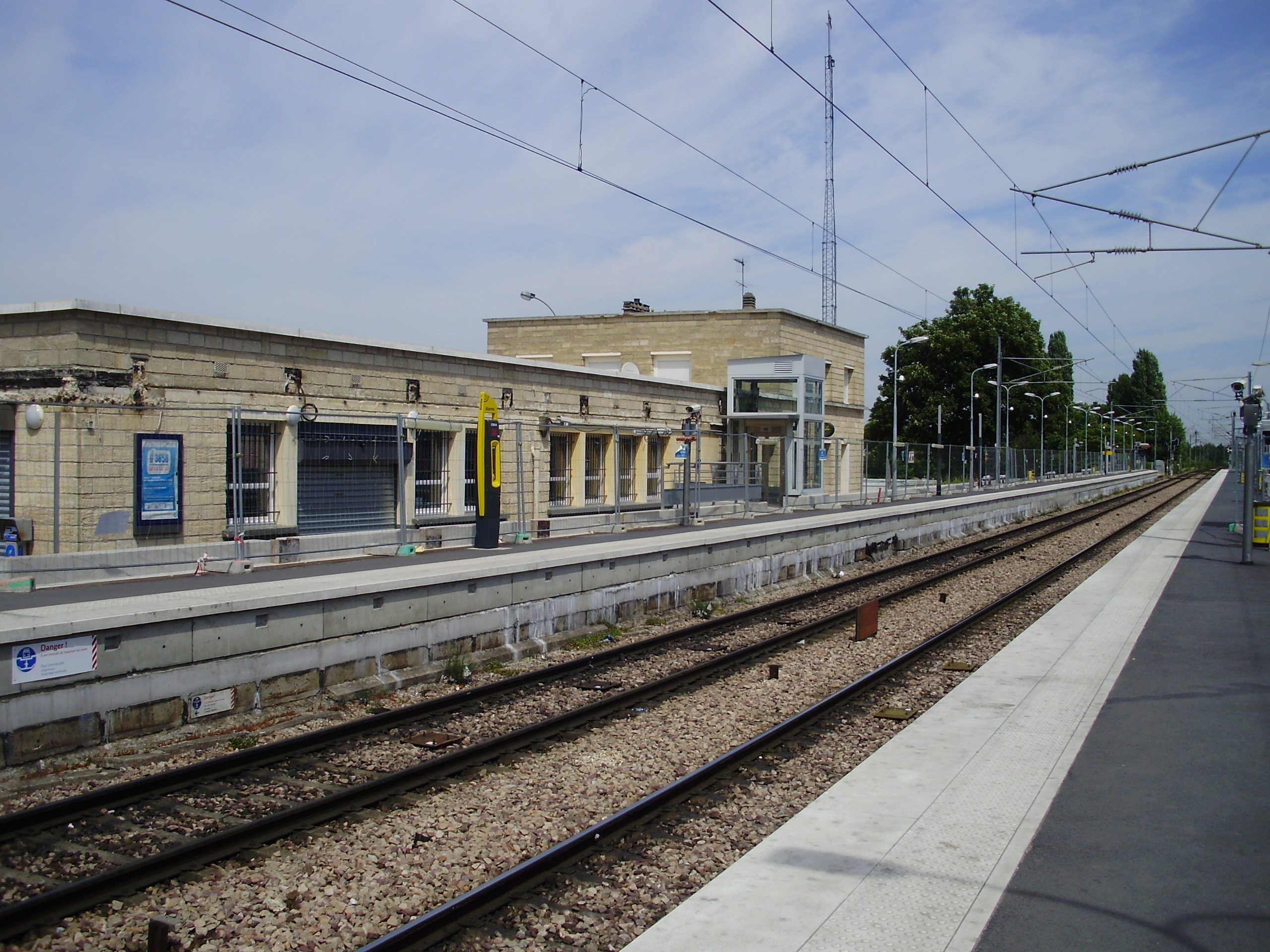
- Villeparisis–Mitry-le-Neuf station platforms

General information
- Location: Paris; France
- Coordinates: 48.953062°N 2.602765°E
- Operator: SNCF

Construction
- Accessible: Yes, by prior reservation

Other information
- Station code: 87271510
- Fare zone: 5

History
- Opened: 1883

Passengers
- 2024: 5,072,146

Services
Preceding station	RER	Following station
Mitry–Claye Terminus	RER B	Vert-Galant towards Robinson or Saint-Rémy-lès-Chevreuse
Location

Villeparisis–Mitry-le-Neuf station is an RER B station between Mitry-Mory and Villeparisis in northeast Paris, in Seine-et-Marne department, France.

== Bus connections ==
- Roissy Est: 2116 2117 2118 2119 2121 2122 2123 2127 2171 2176

== Gallery ==
Non-stop passage of a BB 75000 (Fret SNCF rolling stock), a Z 50000 or Francilien (Transilien Line K stock running to Crépy-en-Valois) and in background a MI 79 (RER B stock running to Robinson).
