= Villepinte, Seine-Saint-Denis =

Villepinte
- Commune
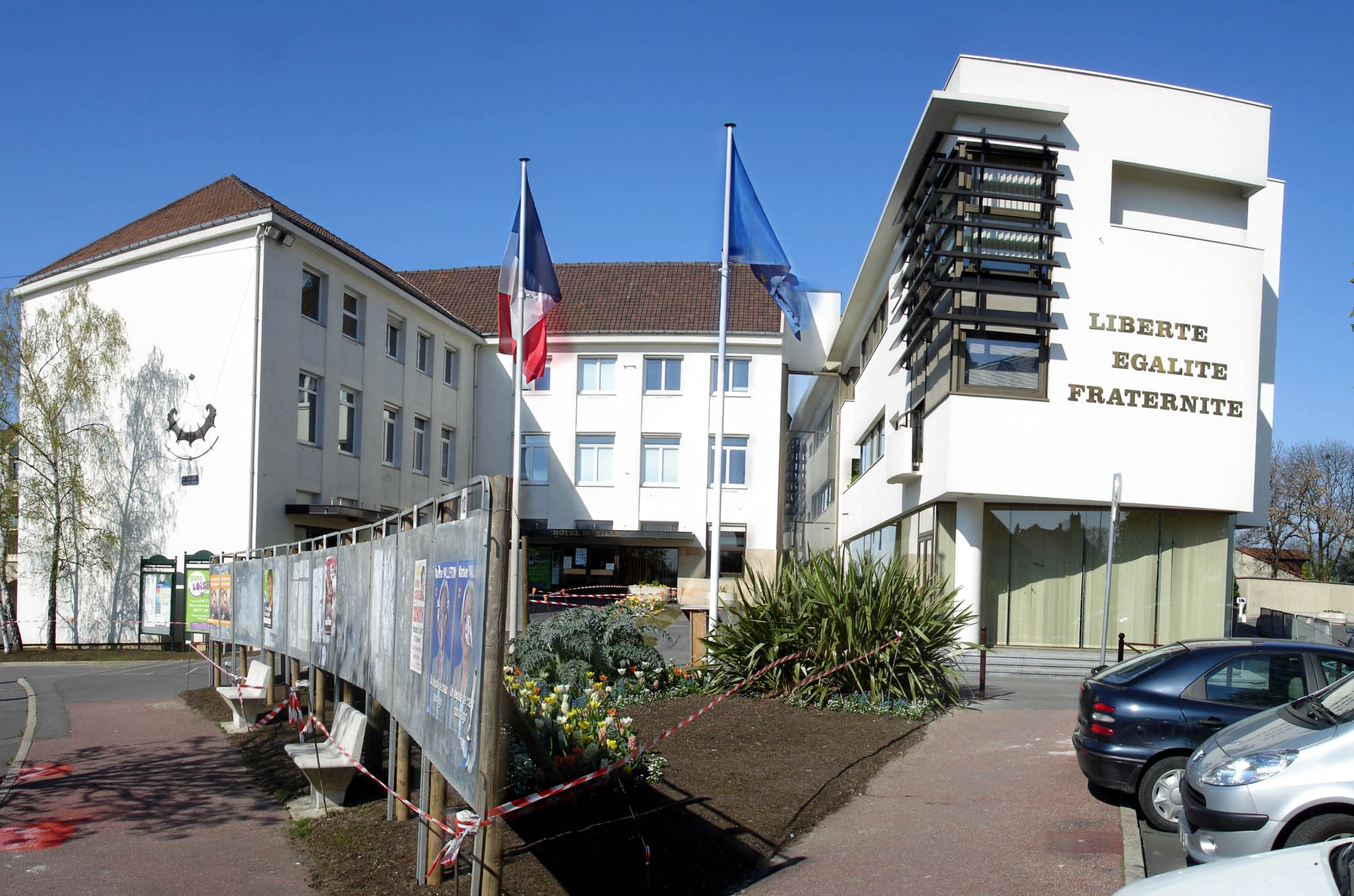
- The Hôtel de Ville

- Coat of arms

- Location (in red) within Paris inner suburbs
- Location of Villepinte
- Location within France Location within Île-de-France (region)
- Coordinates: 48°57′18″N 2°32′28″E
- Country: France
- Region: Île-de-France
- Department: Seine-Saint-Denis
- Arrondissement: Le Raincy
- Canton: Sevran
- Intercommunality: Grand Paris

Government
  - Mayor (2026–32): Mélissa Youssouf
- Area^{1}: 10.37 km^{2} (4.00 sq mi)
- Elevation: 60 m (200 ft)
- Population (2023): 41,470
  - Density: 3,999/km^{2} (10,360/sq mi)
- Time zone: UTC+01:00 (CET)
  - Summer (DST): UTC+02:00 (CEST)
- INSEE/Postal code: 93078 /93420
- ^{1} French Land Register data, which excludes lakes, ponds, glaciers > 1 km^{2} (0.386 sq mi or 247 acres) and river estuaries.

Villepinte (French pronunciation: [vilpɛ̃t]) is a commune in the northeastern suburbs of Paris, France. It is located 18.3 km (11.4 mi) from the centre of Paris. It is near the Charles de Gaulle Airport. The Parc des Expositions de Villepinte is located in the city. As of 2023, the population of the commune was 41,470.

== History ==
The Hôtel de Ville was completed in 1996.

== Population ==
Historical population

Year	Pop.	±% p.a.
1793	260	—
1800	294	+1.77%
1806	284	−0.58%
1821	291	+0.16%
1831	314	+0.76%
1836	287	−1.78%
1841	295	+0.55%
1846	291	−0.27%
1851	313	+1.47%
1856	302	−0.71%
1861	316	+0.91%
1866	332	+0.99%
1872	271	−3.33%
1876	290	+1.71%
1881	334	+2.87%
1886	483	+7.66%
1891	446	−1.58%
1896	589	+5.72%
1901	646	+1.86%

Year	Pop.	±% p.a.
1906	582	−2.06%
1911	633	+1.69%
1921	639	+0.09%
1926	2,178	+27.79%
1931	3,137	+7.57%
1936	3,893	+4.41%
1946	3,785	−0.28%
1954	5,503	+4.79%
1962	7,660	+4.22%
1968	12,103	+7.92%
1975	17,565	+5.46%
1982	23,745	+4.40%
1990	30,303	+3.10%
1999	33,782	+1.21%
2007	35,444	+0.60%
2012	35,820	+0.21%
2017	36,830	+0.56%
2023	41,470	+2.00%

Source: EHESS and INSEE (1968-2023)

== Heraldry ==
The arms of Villepinte are blazoned : Azure, a Passion nail argent between 3 fleurs de lys Or, on a chaussé of the same, 2 plow points sable, point up.

== Transport ==
Villepinte is served by three stations on Paris RER line B: Villepinte, Parc des Expositions, and Vert-Galant.

== Twin towns – sister cities ==
Villepinte is twinned with:

- Schwendi, Germany

== Notable people ==
- Stella Akakpo, athlete
- Lindsay Burlet, handball player
- Alou Diarra, footballer
- Boukary Dramé, footballer
- Alassane També, footballer
- Diandra Tchatchouang, basketball player
- Ibrahima Traoré, footballer
- Saïd Taghmaoui, actor
- Taylor Lapilus, mixed martial artist

== Education ==
The commune has ten preschools (maternelles), as well as 11 elementary schools.

Secondary schools:

- Four junior high schools: Collège Françoise Dolto, Collège Camille Claudel, Collège Jean Jaurès, Collège Les Mousseaux
- Two senior high schools/sixth-form colleges: Lycée Jean Rostand and Lycée Georges Brassens

== See also ==
- Communes of the Seine-Saint-Denis department
