= Ambroise-Marguerite Bardin =

French artist (1768–1842)

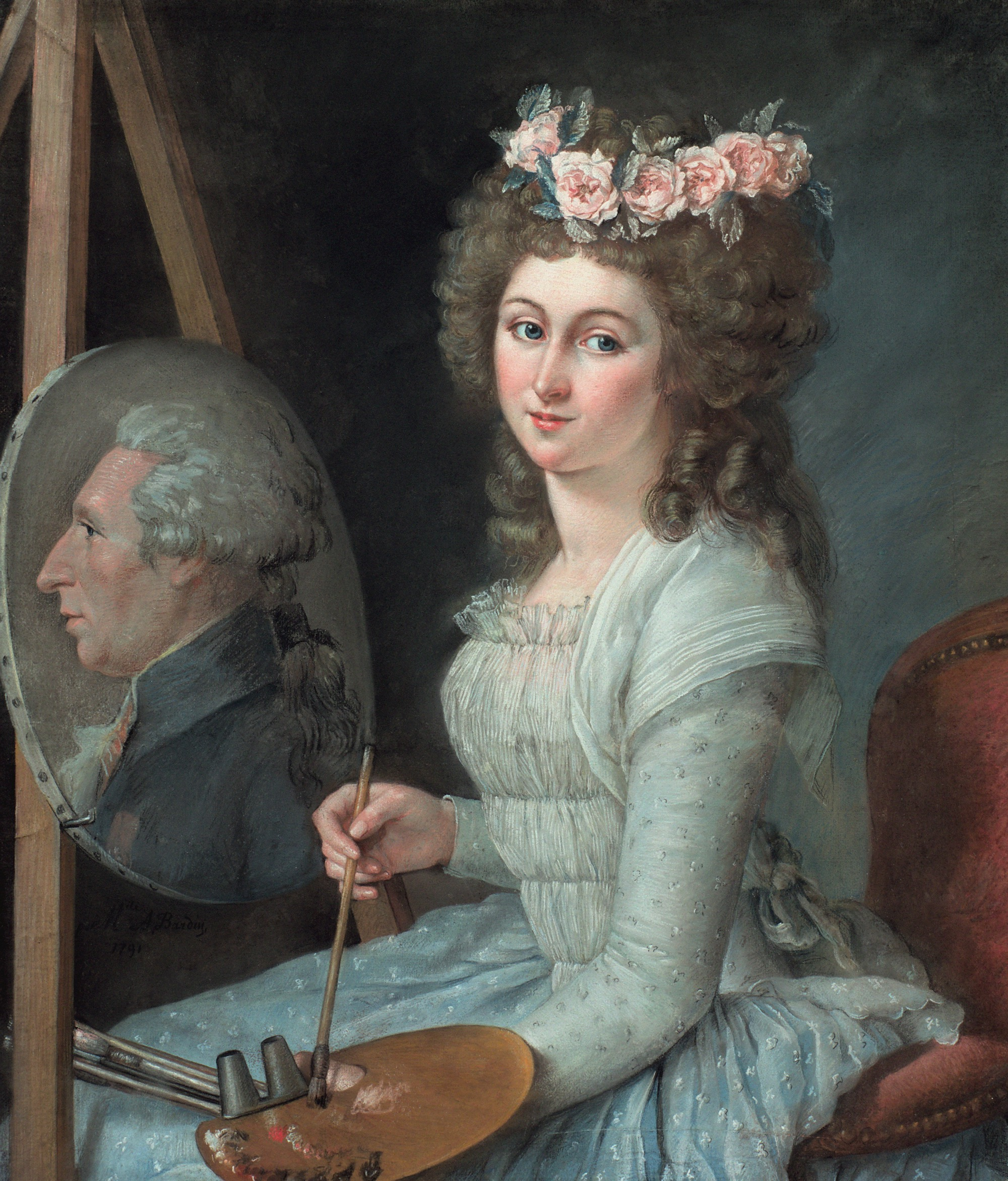
Ambroise-Marguerite Bardin, Self-portrait of the artist, painting her father Jean Bardin, 1791 (Musée des Beaux-Arts d'Orléans)

Ambroise-Marguerite Bardin (1768–1842) was a French painter and pastellist.

Born in Charmentray, Bardin was the daughter of painter Jean Bardin (1732–1809), with whom she studied; her mother was Marie-Madeleine Le Gein (c.1742–1805). On February 11, 1793, she married Pierre-François Mollière, a drawing teacher and assistant of her father's, in Orléans, and with him would later establish a porcelain factory. It appears that she abandoned painting upon her marriage. She also practiced engraving during her career. One "Mlle Bardin soeur" advertised drawing materials in a 1791 edition of the Journal de Loiret, but evidence suggests this was the painter's aunt; she had no sisters. Bardin died in Paris. A pastel self-portrait in which she is painting a portrait of her father, dated 1791, is in the collection of the Musée des Beaux-Arts d'Orléans.
