= Communauté de communes Plaines et Monts de France =

Federation of municipalities in France

Plaines et Monts de France
- Communauté de communes
- Interactive map of Plaines et Monts de France
- Coordinates: 48°59′N 02°43′E
- Country: France
- Region: Île-de-France
- Department: Seine-et-Marne
- No. of communes: {{{nbcomm}}}
- Established: 2013
- Area: 144.7 km^{2} (55.9 sq mi)
- Population (2019): 25,067
  - Density: 173.2/km^{2} (448.7/sq mi)

The Communauté de communes Plaines et Monts de France is a communauté de communes in the Seine-et-Marne département and in the Île-de-France région of France. It was formed on 1 June 2013 by the merger of the former Communauté de communes du Pays de la Goële et du Multien, Communauté de communes de la Plaine de France, Communauté de communes des Portes de la Brie and 4 other communes. It lost 17 communes on 1 January 2016 to the newly created Communauté d'agglomération Roissy Pays de France. Its seat is in Dammartin-en-Goële, which is not part of the communauté de communes anymore. Its area is 144.7 km^{2}, and its population was 25,067 in 2019.

== Composition ==
Since 2016, it consists of 20 communes:

1. Annet-sur-Marne
2. Charmentray
3. Charny
4. Cuisy
5. Fresnes-sur-Marne
6. Iverny
7. Marchémoret
8. Messy
9. Montgé-en-Goële
10. Nantouillet
11. Oissery
12. Le Pin
13. Le Plessis-aux-Bois
14. Le Plessis-l'Évêque
15. Précy-sur-Marne
16. Saint-Mesmes
17. Saint-Pathus
18. Villeroy
19. Villevaudé
20. Vinantes
