= Sevran Beaudottes station =

Railway station in Sevran, France

Sevran Beaudottes
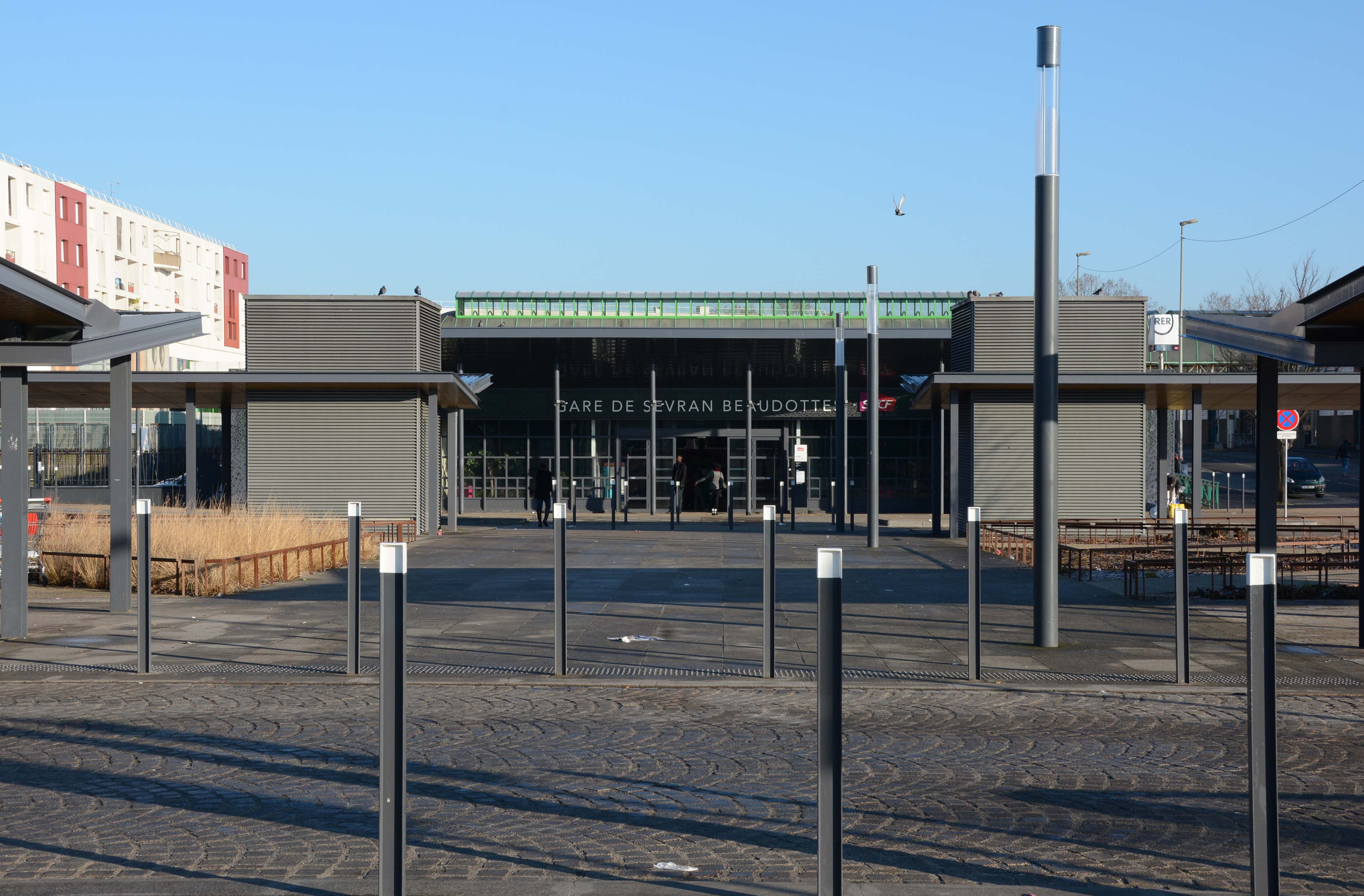
- Sevran Beaudottes station entrance

General information
- Location: Rue Raoul Dautry; Sevran; France
- Coordinates: 48.947222°N 2.524167°E
- Operator: SNCF

Construction
- Accessible: Yes, by prior reservation

Other information
- Station code: 87271445
- Fare zone: 4

History
- Opened: 1976

Passengers
- 2024: 10,250,541

Services
Preceding station	RER	Following station
Villepinte towards Aéroport Charles de Gaulle 2 TGV	RER B	Aulnay-sous-Bois towards Robinson or Saint-Rémy-lès-Chevreuse

Other services
Preceding station	Paris Metro	Following station
Aulnay Val Francillia towards Saint-Denis–Pleyel	Line 16 (2027)	Sevran–Livry towards Clichy–Montfermeil
Location

Sevran Beaudottes station is an RER station in Sevran, Seine-Saint-Denis, a northeastern suburb of Paris. It is on RER B between Villepinte and Aulnay-sous-Bois.
