= Mitry-Mory =

- Commune
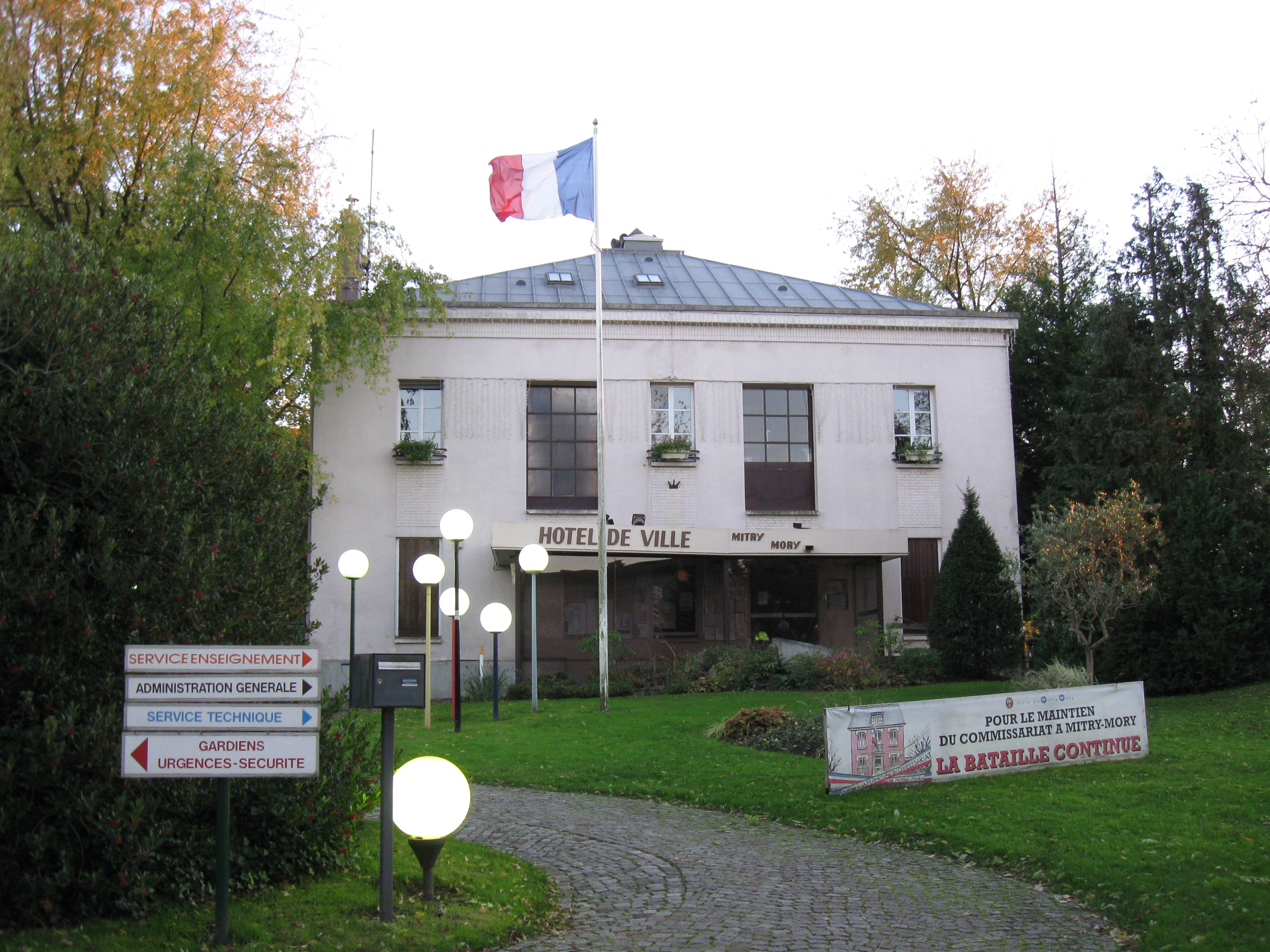
- The Hôtel de Ville

- Coat of arms

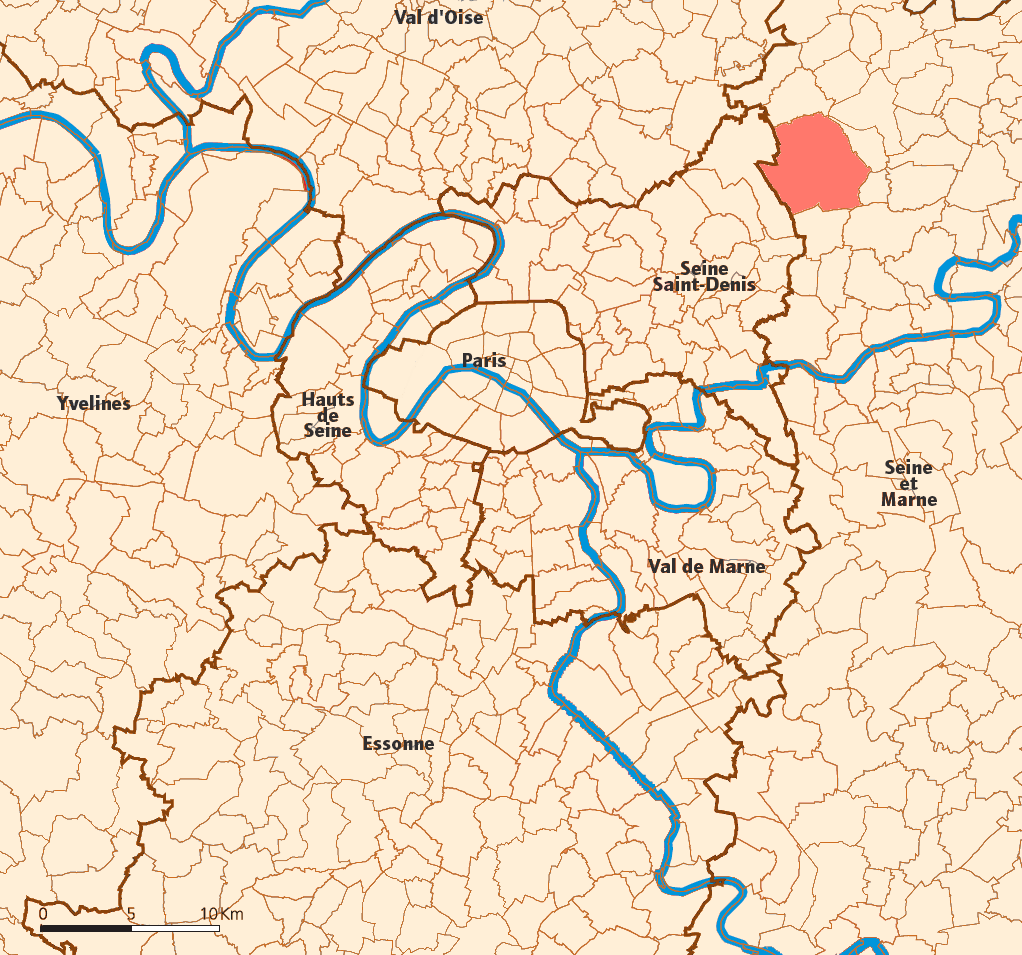
- Location (in red) within Paris inner and outer suburbs
- Location of Mitry-Mory
- Location within France Location within Île-de-France (region)
- Coordinates: 48°59′00″N 2°37′00″E
- Country: France
- Region: Île-de-France
- Department: Seine-et-Marne
- Arrondissement: Meaux
- Canton: Mitry-Mory
- Intercommunality: CA Roissy Pays de France

Government
  - Mayor (2020–2026): Charlotte Blandiot-Faride
- Area^{1}: 29.95 km^{2} (11.56 sq mi)
- Highest elevation: 106 m (348 ft)
- Lowest elevation: 53 m (174 ft)
- Population (2023): 20,456
  - Density: 683.0/km^{2} (1,769/sq mi)
- Time zone: UTC+01:00 (CET)
  - Summer (DST): UTC+02:00 (CEST)
- INSEE/Postal code: 77294 /77290
- ^{1} French Land Register data, which excludes lakes, ponds, glaciers > 1 km^{2} (0.386 sq mi or 247 acres) and river estuaries.

Mitry-Mory (French pronunciation: [mitʁi mɔʁi]) is a commune in the Seine-et-Marne department in the Île-de-France region in north-central France. It is located in the north-eastern suburbs of Paris 24.4 km (15.2 mi) from the center just off the N2 national highway.

About one-sixth of Charles de Gaulle Airport (CDG) (essentially runways and taxiways) lies on the territory of the commune of Mitry-Mory—mostly at the end of the runway. The construction of CDG caused the closure of the prewar Mitry-Mory airfield in the late 1960s. From the air, the most prominent feature, aside from farmland, is the Great circle (or round-about) of Rue de la Garenne, a feature which forms a wagon wheel like structure with spokes forming a cross in which a crucifix building is surrounded by another inter-circle round-about. It is also a major railroad centre. Another very prominent feature is a huge parking lot for such a small commune.

Many of the streets and roads are named for famous people: Mozart, Guy-Lussac, Léon Foucault, Berlioz, Picasso, Gauguin among others — some of whom actually visited there.

Mitry-Mory is very convenient to Paris and a less expensive place to live for those who work in Paris but prefer the commute by train or road.

== Twin towns ==
It is twinned with the English town of Prudhoe in Northumberland.

== History ==
The commune of Mitry-Mory was created in 1839 by the merger of the commune of Mitry with the commune of Mory. The Hôtel de Ville is a former villa which was remodelled in 1936.

The Commune Church contains a very important Pipe Organ which survived the French Revolution and was used by Gene Bedient as a model in his studies of French Organs to build similar ones in the United States.

== Demographics ==
Inhabitants are called Mitryens in French.

Historical population
Year	Pop.	±% p.a.
1968	13,122	—
1975	13,741	+0.66%
1982	12,731	−1.08%
1990	15,205	+2.24%
1999	16,869	+1.16%
2007	18,348	+1.06%
2012	19,147	+0.86%
2017	19,931	+0.81%
2023	20,456	+0.43%
Source: INSEE

== Transportation ==
The Commune shares an RER station with the neighboring commune of Villeparisis on the RER B line with the Villeparisis–Mitry-le-Neuf station. It is also served by Mitry–Claye station, which is an interchange station on Paris RER line B and on the Transilien Paris-Nord suburban rail line. The commune is an important rail center.

== Education ==
Schools in the commune include:

- Preschools (écoles maternelles)
  - Acacias: Guy Môquet and Vincent van Gogh
  - Bourg: Anne-Claude Godeau and Jacqueline Quatremaire
  - Mitry-le-Neuf: Elsa Triolet, Emile Zola, and Jean de la Fontaine
- Primary schools:
  - Acacias: Guy Môquet and Vincent van Gogh
  - Bourg: François Couperin and Jean-Moulin
  - Mitry-le-Neuf: Irène et Frédéric Joliot-Curie, Henri Barbusse, and Noël Fraboulet
- Junior high schools: Collège Paul Langevin in Mory/Acacias and Collège Erik Satie in Mitry-le-Neuf
- Lycée Honoré de Balzac in Mory/Acacias, a senior high school/sixth-form college

== See also ==
- Communes of the Seine-et-Marne department
