= Le Plessis-aux-Bois =

- Commune
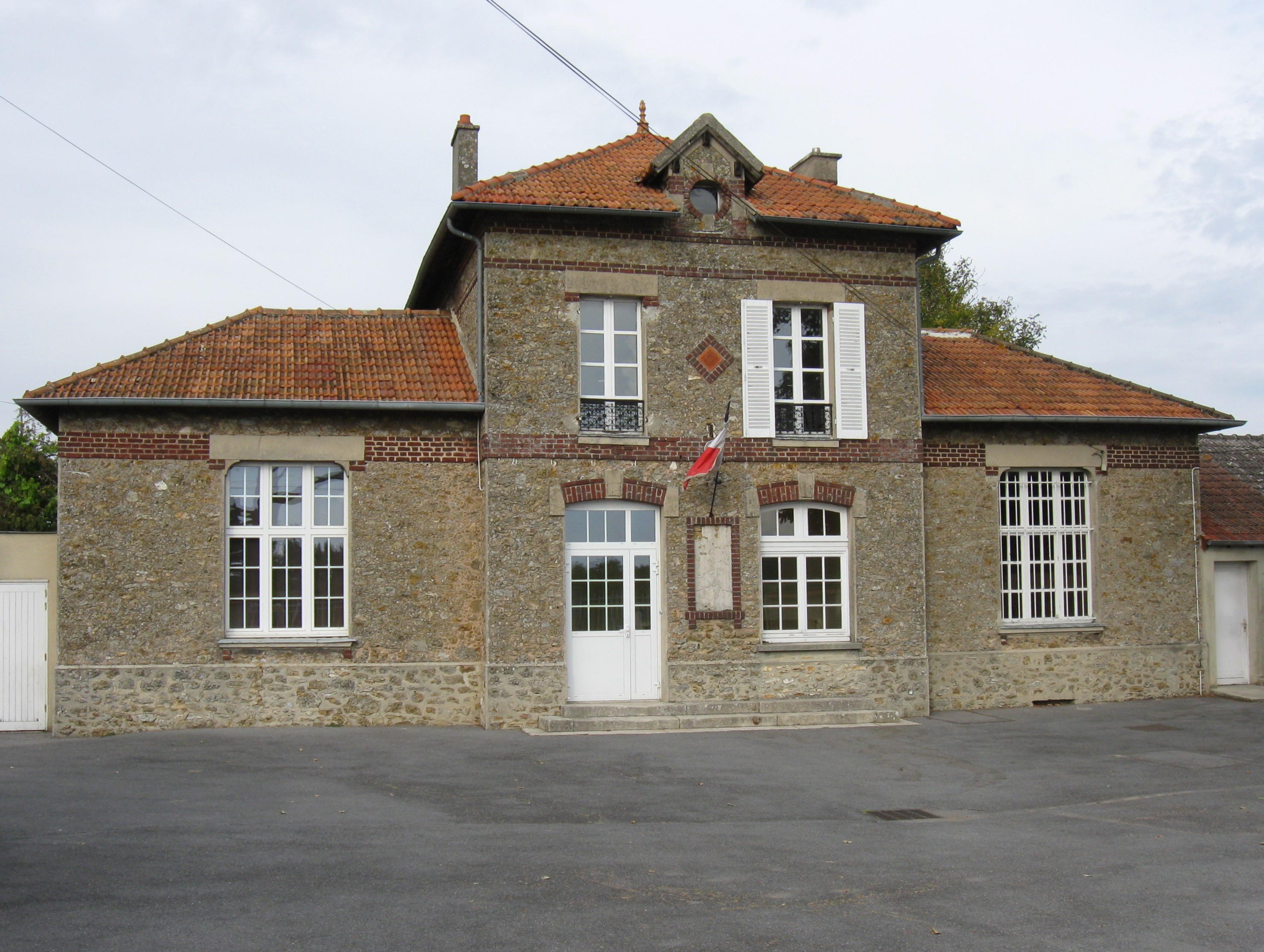
- The town hall in Le Plessis-aux-Bois
- Location of Le Plessis-aux-Bois
- Location within France Location within Île-de-France (region)
- Coordinates: 49°00′12″N 2°46′06″E
- Country: France
- Region: Île-de-France
- Department: Seine-et-Marne
- Arrondissement: Meaux
- Canton: Claye-Souilly
- Intercommunality: CC Plaines et Monts de France

Government
  - Mayor (2020–2026): Cyril Proffit
- Area^{1}: 3.41 km^{2} (1.32 sq mi)
- Highest elevation: 136 m (446 ft)
- Lowest elevation: 98 m (322 ft)
- Population (2023): 261
  - Density: 76.5/km^{2} (198/sq mi)
- Time zone: UTC+01:00 (CET)
  - Summer (DST): UTC+02:00 (CEST)
- INSEE/Postal code: 77364 /77165
- ^{1} French Land Register data, which excludes lakes, ponds, glaciers > 1 km^{2} (0.386 sq mi or 247 acres) and river estuaries.

Le Plessis-aux-Bois (French pronunciation: [lə plɛsi o bwa]) is a commune in the Seine-et-Marne department in the Île-de-France region in north-central France.

== Demographics ==
Inhabitants are called Plessisboisiens.

== See also ==
- Communes of the Seine-et-Marne department
