= Charny, Seine-et-Marne =

Charny
- Commune
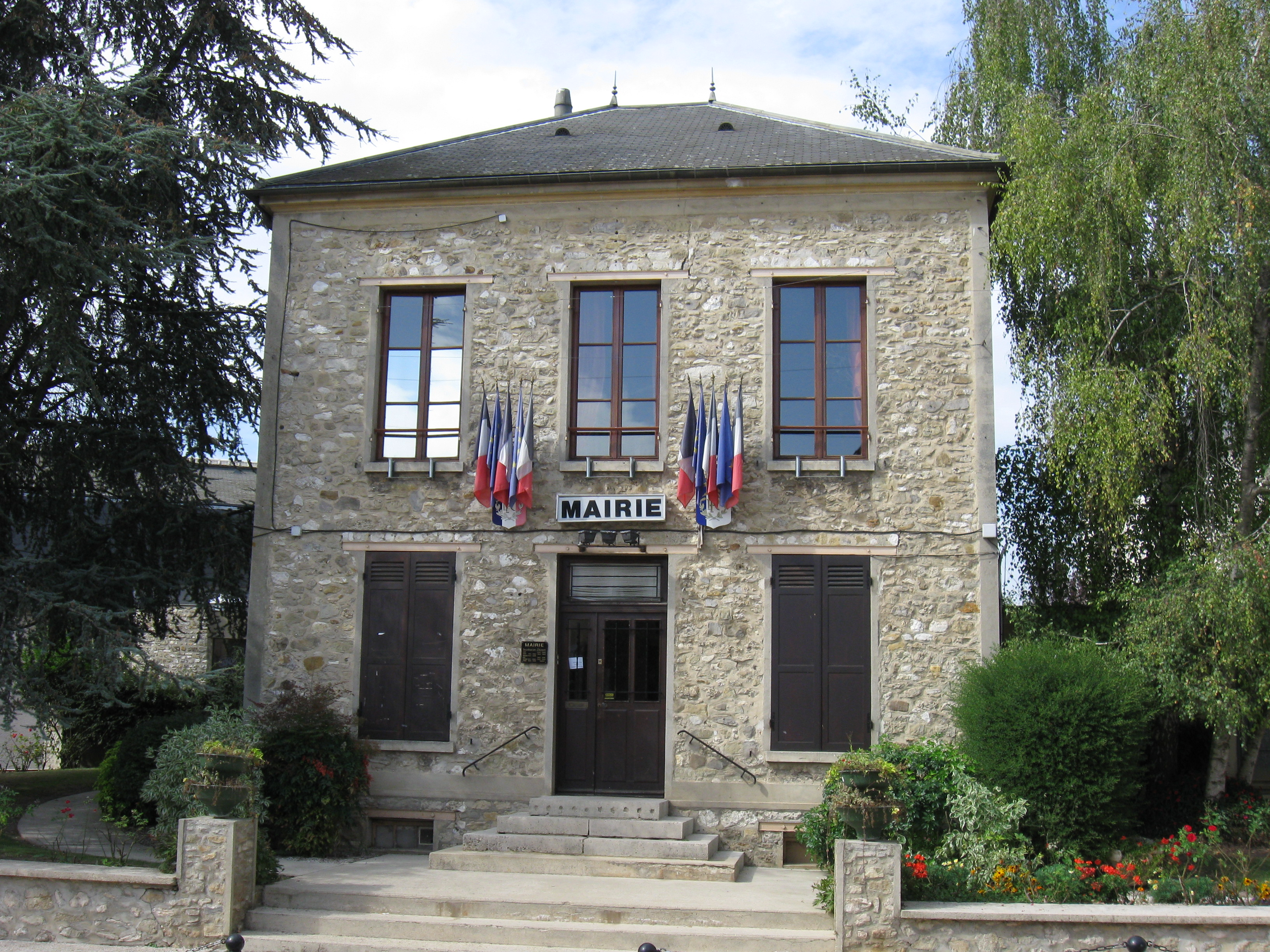
- The town hall of Charny

- Coat of arms

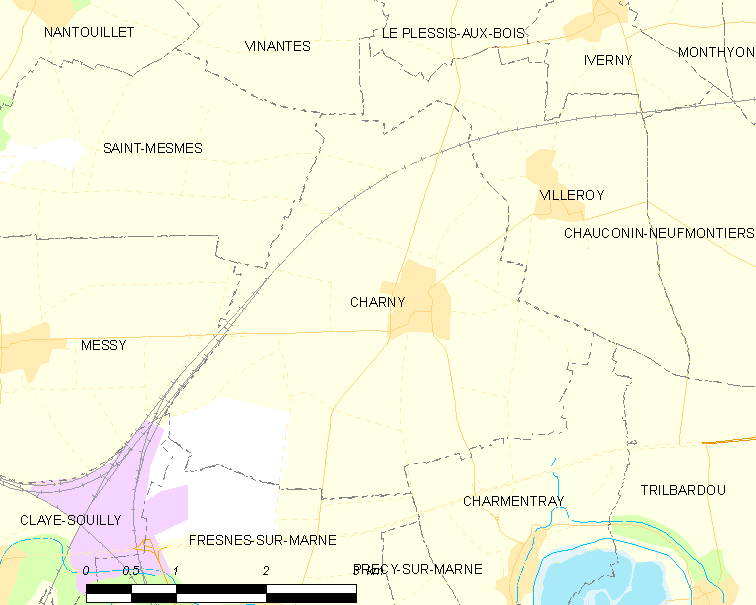
- Location of Charny
- Location within France Location within Île-de-France (region)
- Coordinates: 48°58′13″N 2°45′42″E
- Country: France
- Region: Île-de-France
- Department: Seine-et-Marne
- Arrondissement: Meaux
- Canton: Claye-Souilly
- Intercommunality: CC Plaines et Monts de France

Government
  - Mayor (2020–2026): Xavier Ferreira
- Area^{1}: 12.54 km^{2} (4.84 sq mi)
- Highest elevation: 120 m (390 ft)
- Lowest elevation: 65 m (213 ft)
- Population (2023): 1,585
  - Density: 126.4/km^{2} (327.4/sq mi)
- Time zone: UTC+01:00 (CET)
  - Summer (DST): UTC+02:00 (CEST)
- INSEE/Postal code: 77095 /77410
- ^{1} French Land Register data, which excludes lakes, ponds, glaciers > 1 km^{2} (0.386 sq mi or 247 acres) and river estuaries.

Charny (French pronunciation: [ʃaʁni]) is a commune in the Seine-et-Marne department in the Île-de-France region in north-central France.

== Demographics ==
The inhabitants are called Charnicois.

== See also ==
- Communes of the Seine-et-Marne department
