= Messy, Seine-et-Marne =

Messy
- Commune
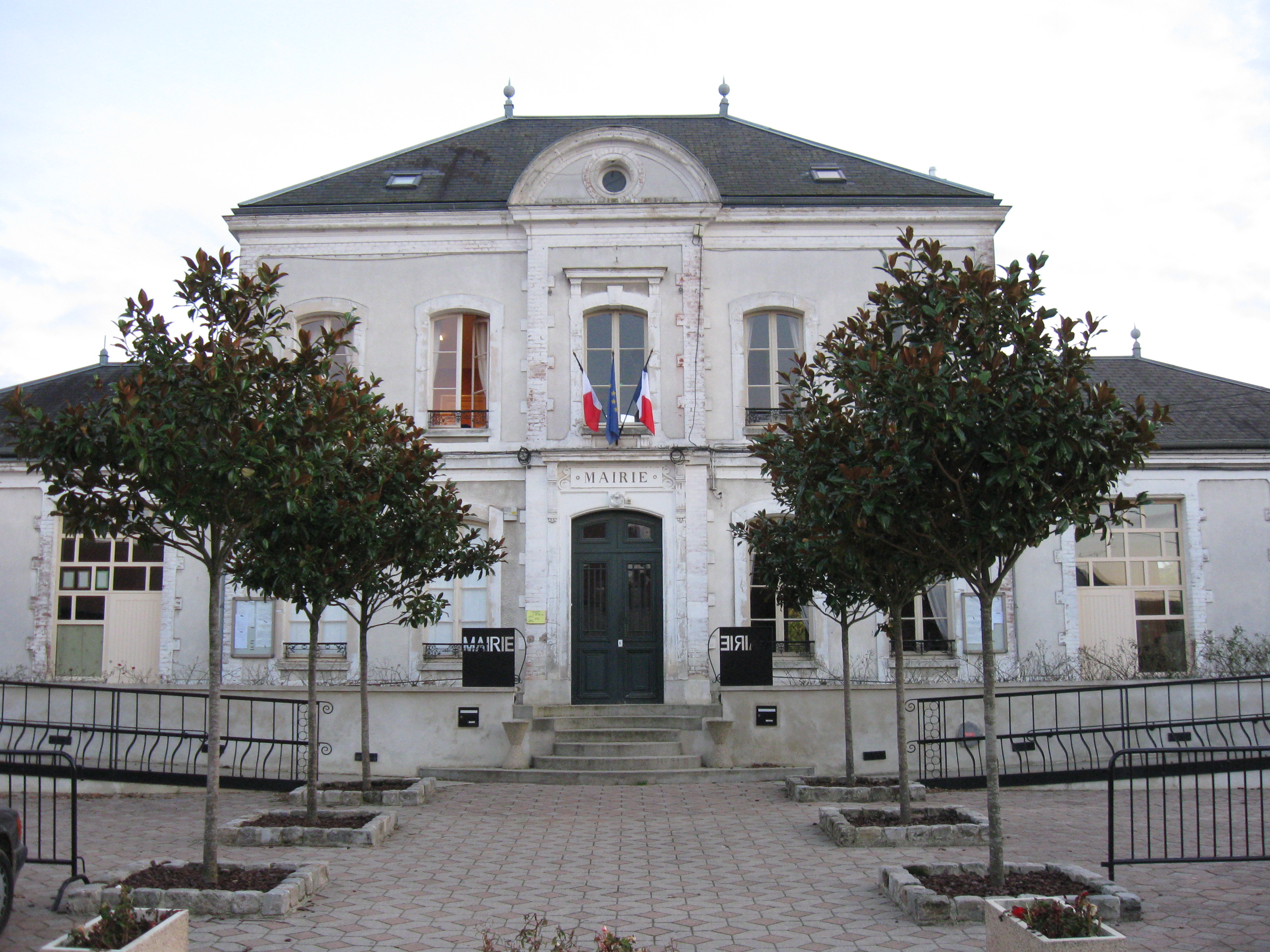
- The town hall of Messy

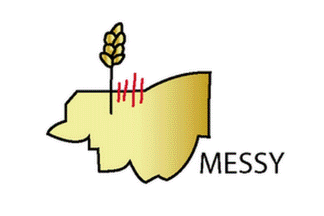
- Flag

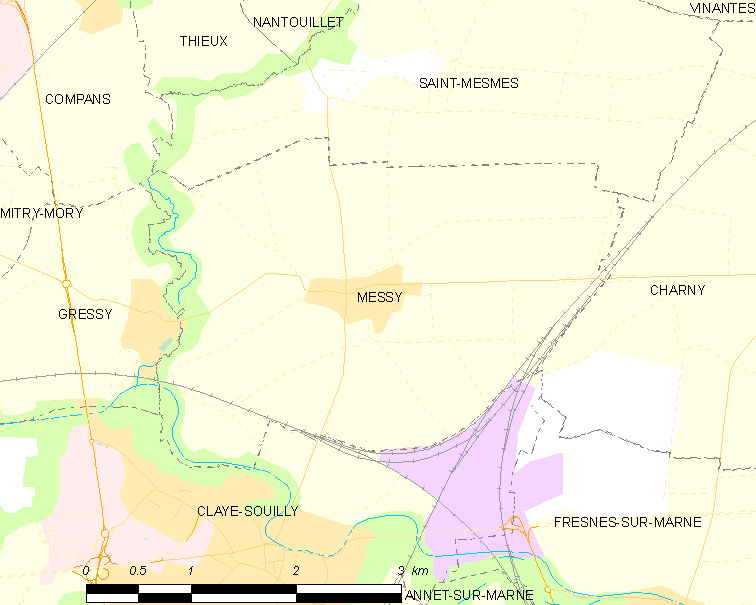
- Location of Messy
- Location within France Location within Île-de-France (region)
- Coordinates: 48°58′02″N 2°42′01″E
- Country: France
- Region: Île-de-France
- Department: Seine-et-Marne
- Arrondissement: Meaux
- Canton: Claye-Souilly
- Intercommunality: CC Plaines et Monts de France

Government
  - Mayor (2023–2026): Carlos Neto
- Area^{1}: 10.32 km^{2} (3.98 sq mi)
- Highest elevation: 98 m (322 ft)
- Lowest elevation: 49 m (161 ft)
- Population (2023): 1,219
  - Density: 118.1/km^{2} (305.9/sq mi)
- Time zone: UTC+01:00 (CET)
  - Summer (DST): UTC+02:00 (CEST)
- INSEE/Postal code: 77292 /77410
- ^{1} French Land Register data, which excludes lakes, ponds, glaciers > 1 km^{2} (0.386 sq mi or 247 acres) and river estuaries.

Messy (French pronunciation: [mɛsi]) is a commune in the Seine-et-Marne department in the Île-de-France region in north-central France.

== Demographics ==
The inhabitants are called the Messiens.

== See also ==
- Communes of the Seine-et-Marne department
