= Charmentray =

- Commune
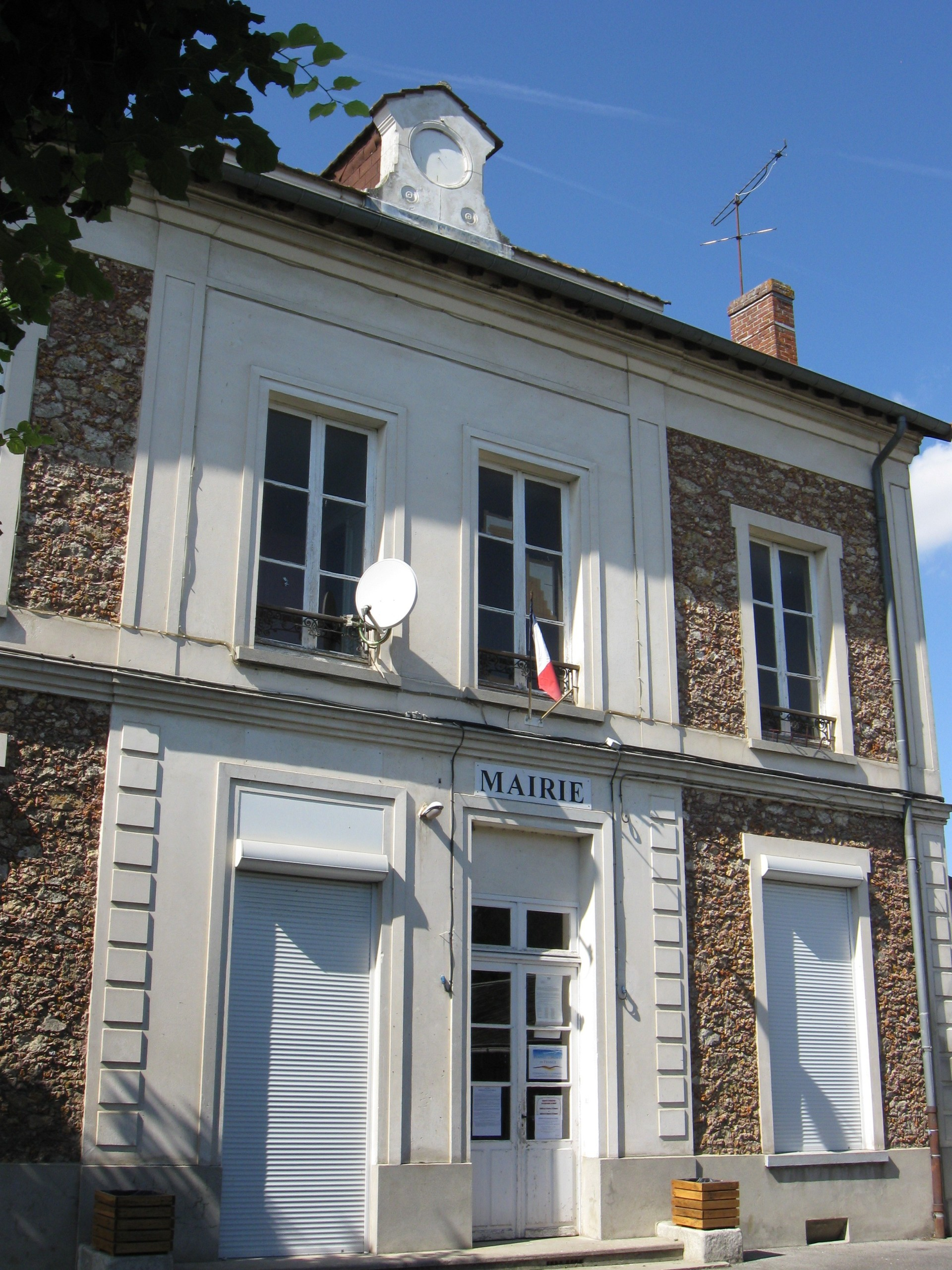
- The town hall of Charmentray

- Coat of arms

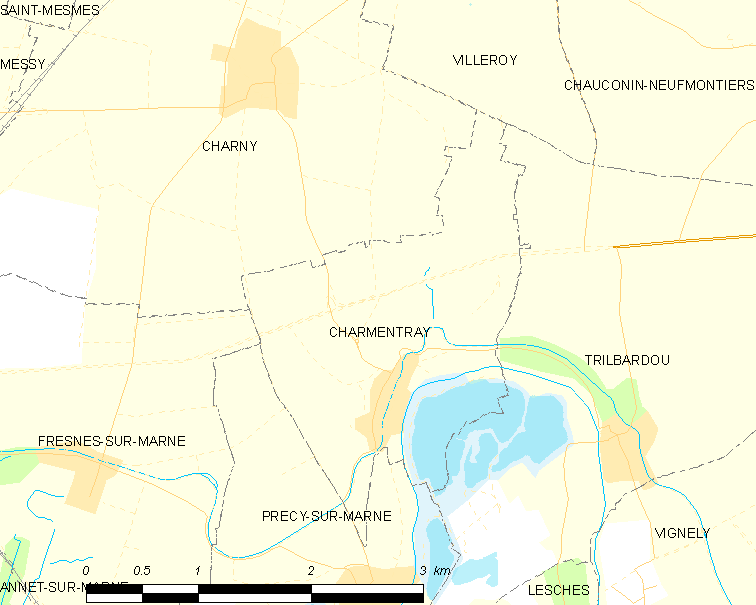
- Location of Charmentray
- Location within France Location within Île-de-France (region)
- Coordinates: 48°56′43″N 2°46′35″E
- Country: France
- Region: Île-de-France
- Department: Seine-et-Marne
- Arrondissement: Meaux
- Canton: Claye-Souilly
- Intercommunality: CC Plaines et Monts de France

Government
  - Mayor (2020–2026): Bernard Lenfant
- Area^{1}: 4.67 km^{2} (1.80 sq mi)
- Highest elevation: 95 m (312 ft)
- Lowest elevation: 40 m (130 ft)
- Population (2023): 291
  - Density: 62.3/km^{2} (161/sq mi)
- Time zone: UTC+01:00 (CET)
  - Summer (DST): UTC+02:00 (CEST)
- INSEE/Postal code: 77094 /77410
- ^{1} French Land Register data, which excludes lakes, ponds, glaciers > 1 km^{2} (0.386 sq mi or 247 acres) and river estuaries.

Charmentray (French pronunciation: [ʃaʁmɑ̃tʁɛ]) is a commune in the Seine-et-Marne department in the Île-de-France region in north-central France. It was the birthplace of painter Ambroise-Marguerite Bardin.

== Demographics ==
The inhabitants are called Carmentraciens.

== See also ==
- Communes of the Seine-et-Marne department
