= Saint-Pathus =

- Commune
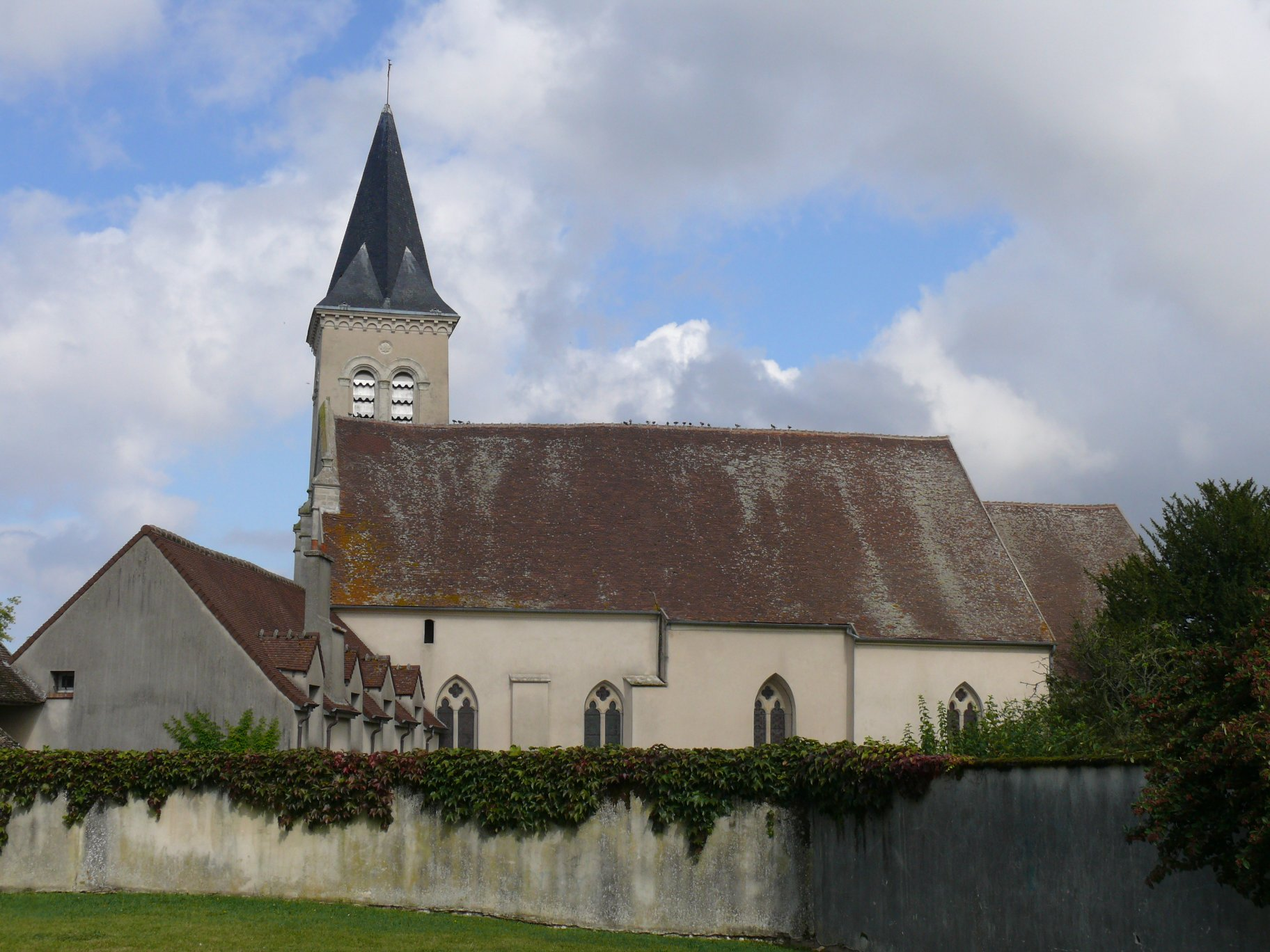
- The church in Saint-Pathus

- Coat of arms
- Location of Saint-Pathus
- Location within France Location within Île-de-France (region)
- Coordinates: 49°04′N 2°48′E
- Country: France
- Region: Île-de-France
- Department: Seine-et-Marne
- Arrondissement: Meaux
- Canton: Mitry-Mory
- Intercommunality: CC Plaines et Monts de France

Government
  - Mayor (2024–2026): Benoit Dantec
- Area^{1}: 5.36 km^{2} (2.07 sq mi)
- Highest elevation: 113 m (371 ft)
- Lowest elevation: 89 m (292 ft)
- Population (2023): 6,479
  - Density: 1,210/km^{2} (3,130/sq mi)
- Time zone: UTC+01:00 (CET)
  - Summer (DST): UTC+02:00 (CEST)
- INSEE/Postal code: 77430 /77178
- ^{1} French Land Register data, which excludes lakes, ponds, glaciers > 1 km^{2} (0.386 sq mi or 247 acres) and river estuaries.

Saint-Pathus (French: [sɛ̃ paty]) is a commune in the Seine-et-Marne department in the Île-de-France region in north-central France.

Saint-Pathus is coterminous with Oissery.

On 3 March 1974 Turkish Airlines Flight 981 crashed, with six passengers ejected from the aircraft landing near Saint-Pathus.

== Demographics ==
Inhabitants of Saint-Pathus are called Saint-Pathusiens in French.

Historical population
Year	Pop.	±% p.a.
1968	342	—
1975	1,295	+20.95%
1982	2,921	+12.32%
1990	4,515	+5.59%
1999	4,829	+0.75%
2007	5,258	+1.07%
2012	5,901	+2.33%
2017	6,055	+0.52%
2023	6,479	+1.13%
Source: INSEE

== See also ==
- Communes of the Seine-et-Marne department
