= Fresnes-sur-Marne =

- Commune
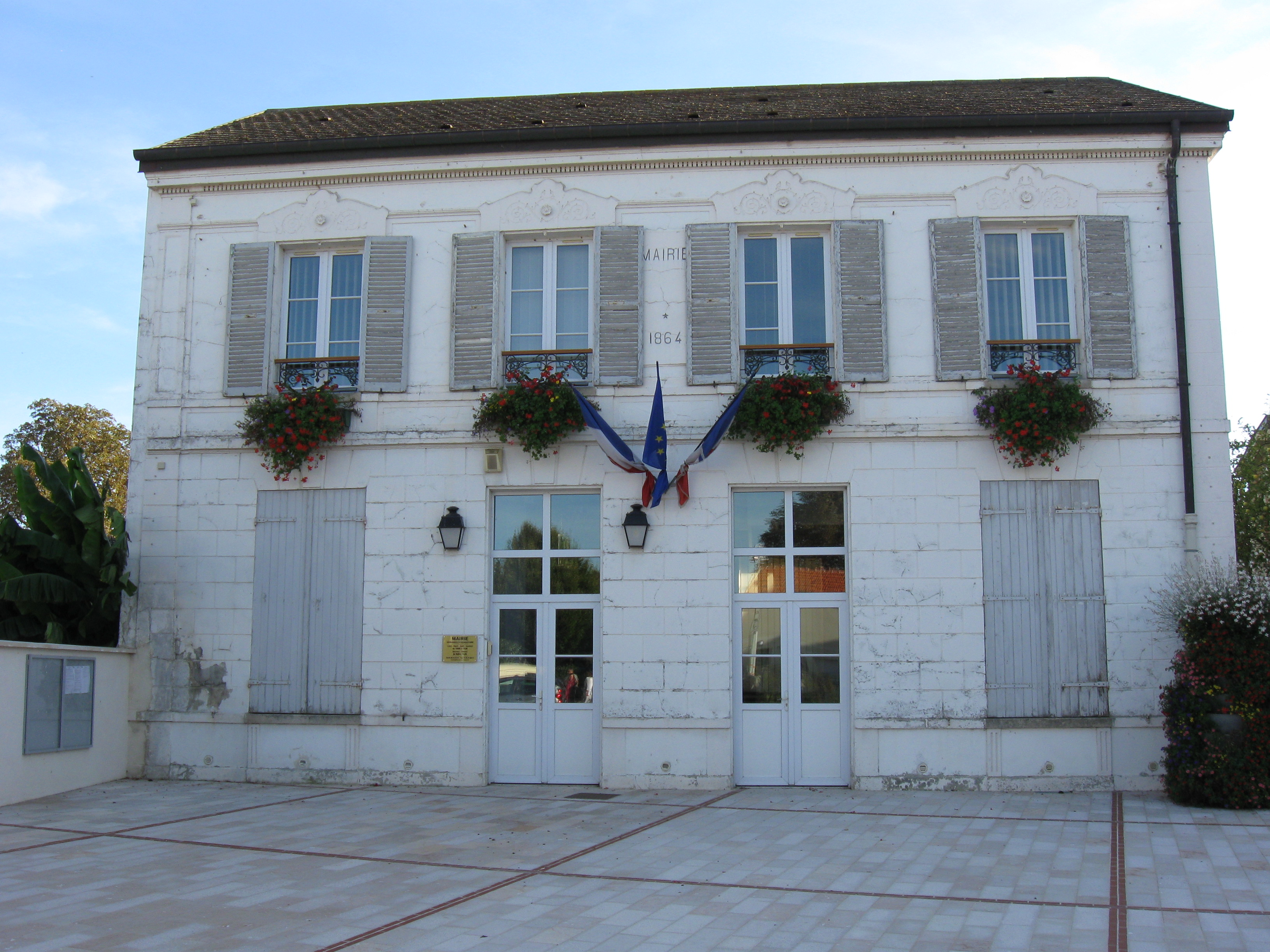
- The town hall of Fresnes-sur-Marne

- Coat of arms

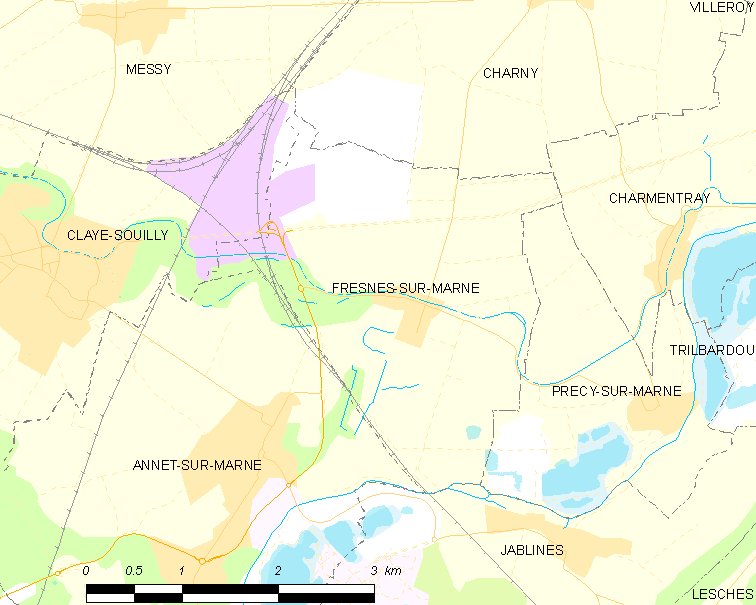
- Location of Fresnes-sur-Marne
- Location within France Location within Île-de-France (region)
- Coordinates: 48°56′16″N 2°44′30″E
- Country: France
- Region: Île-de-France
- Department: Seine-et-Marne
- Arrondissement: Meaux
- Canton: Claye-Souilly
- Intercommunality: CC Plaines et Monts de France

Government
  - Mayor (2020–2026): Jean Lefort
- Area^{1}: 7.46 km^{2} (2.88 sq mi)
- Highest elevation: 88 m (289 ft)
- Lowest elevation: 38 m (125 ft)
- Population (2023): 948
  - Density: 127/km^{2} (329/sq mi)
- Demonym: Fresnois
- Time zone: UTC+01:00 (CET)
  - Summer (DST): UTC+02:00 (CEST)
- INSEE/Postal code: 77196 /77410
- ^{1} French Land Register data, which excludes lakes, ponds, glaciers > 1 km^{2} (0.386 sq mi or 247 acres) and river estuaries.

Fresnes-sur-Marne (French pronunciation: [fʁɛn syʁ maʁn]; lit. 'Fresnes-on-Marne') is a commune in the Seine-et-Marne department in the Île-de-France region in northern France.

== History ==
The Château de Fresnes was located here. On 12 January 1641 it was purchased by Henri de Guénégaud, who had the noted French architect François Mansart design and construct a chapel around 1644 to 1650. The château and chapel were demolished in 1828–1830.

== Demographics ==
Inhabitants of Fresnes-sur-Marne are called Fresnois (masculine) and Fresnoises (feminine).

== Notable people ==
- Henri Buguet (1761–1833), historical and portrait painter

== See also ==
- Communes of the Seine-et-Marne department
