= Cuisy, Seine-et-Marne =

Cuisy
- Commune
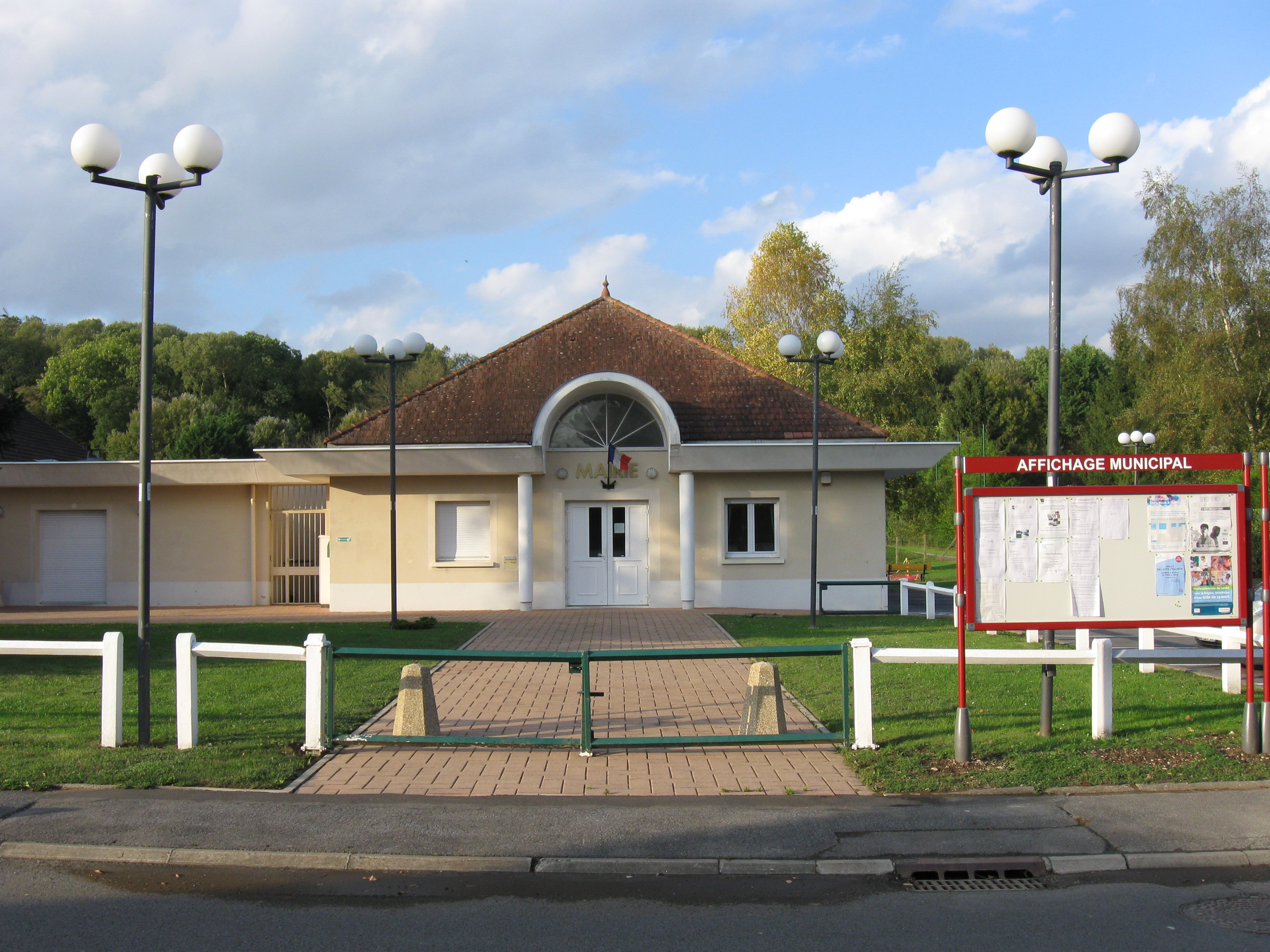
- The town hall in Cuisy
- Location of Cuisy
- Location within France Location within Île-de-France (region)
- Coordinates: 49°01′13″N 2°46′22″E
- Country: France
- Region: Île-de-France
- Department: Seine-et-Marne
- Arrondissement: Meaux
- Canton: Claye-Souilly
- Intercommunality: CC Plaines et Monts de France

Government
  - Mayor (2020–2026): Frédéric Besnard
- Area^{1}: 3.33 km^{2} (1.29 sq mi)
- Highest elevation: 185 m (607 ft)
- Lowest elevation: 102 m (335 ft)
- Population (2023): 476
  - Density: 143/km^{2} (370/sq mi)
- Time zone: UTC+01:00 (CET)
  - Summer (DST): UTC+02:00 (CEST)
- INSEE/Postal code: 77150 /77165
- ^{1} French Land Register data, which excludes lakes, ponds, glaciers > 1 km^{2} (0.386 sq mi or 247 acres) and river estuaries.

Cuisy (French pronunciation: [kɥizi]) is a commune in the Seine-et-Marne department in the Île-de-France region in north-central France.

== Demographics ==
Inhabitants of Cuisy are called Cuisiaciens.

== See also ==
- Communes of the Seine-et-Marne department
