= Villeparisis =

- Commune
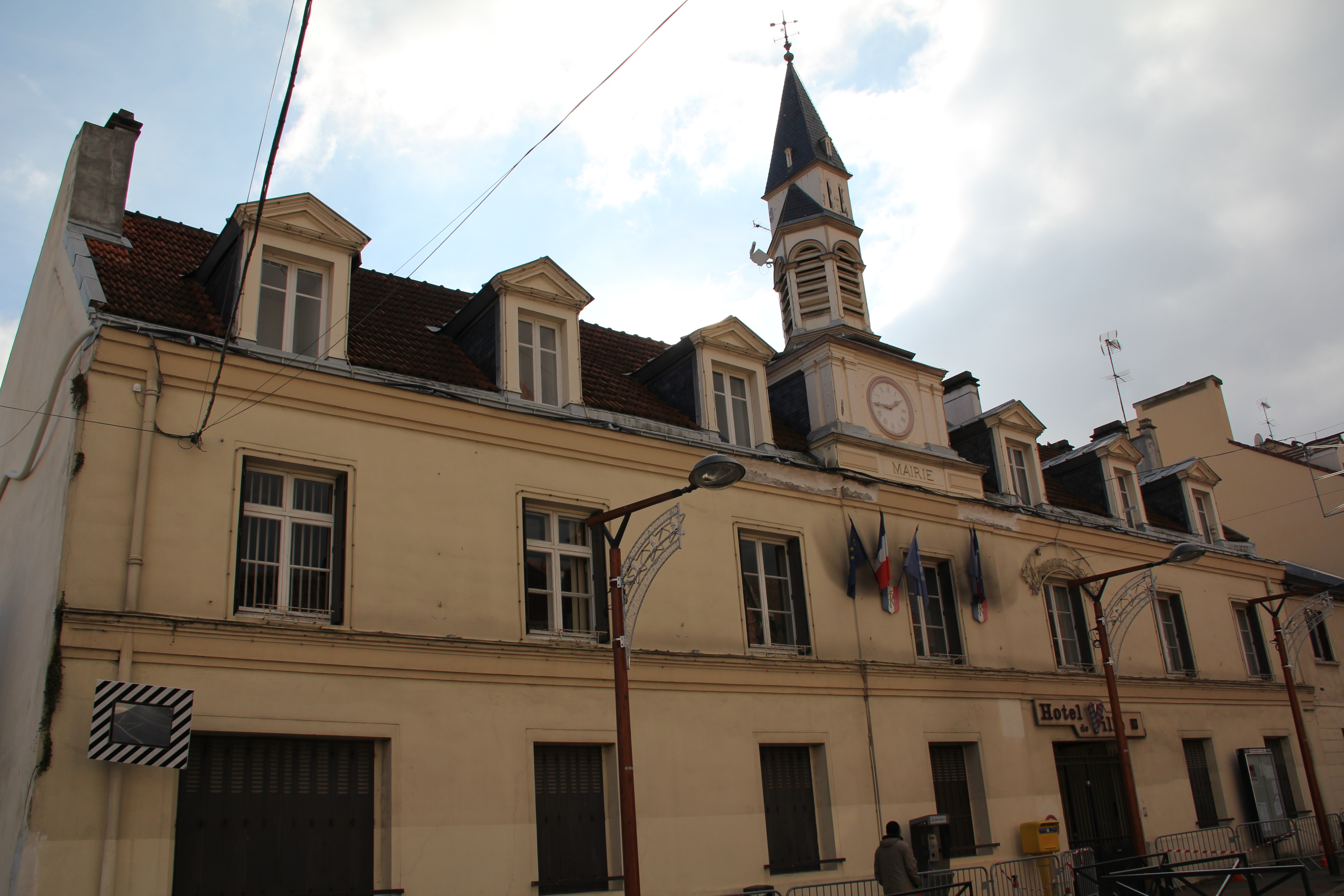
- The Hôtel de Ville

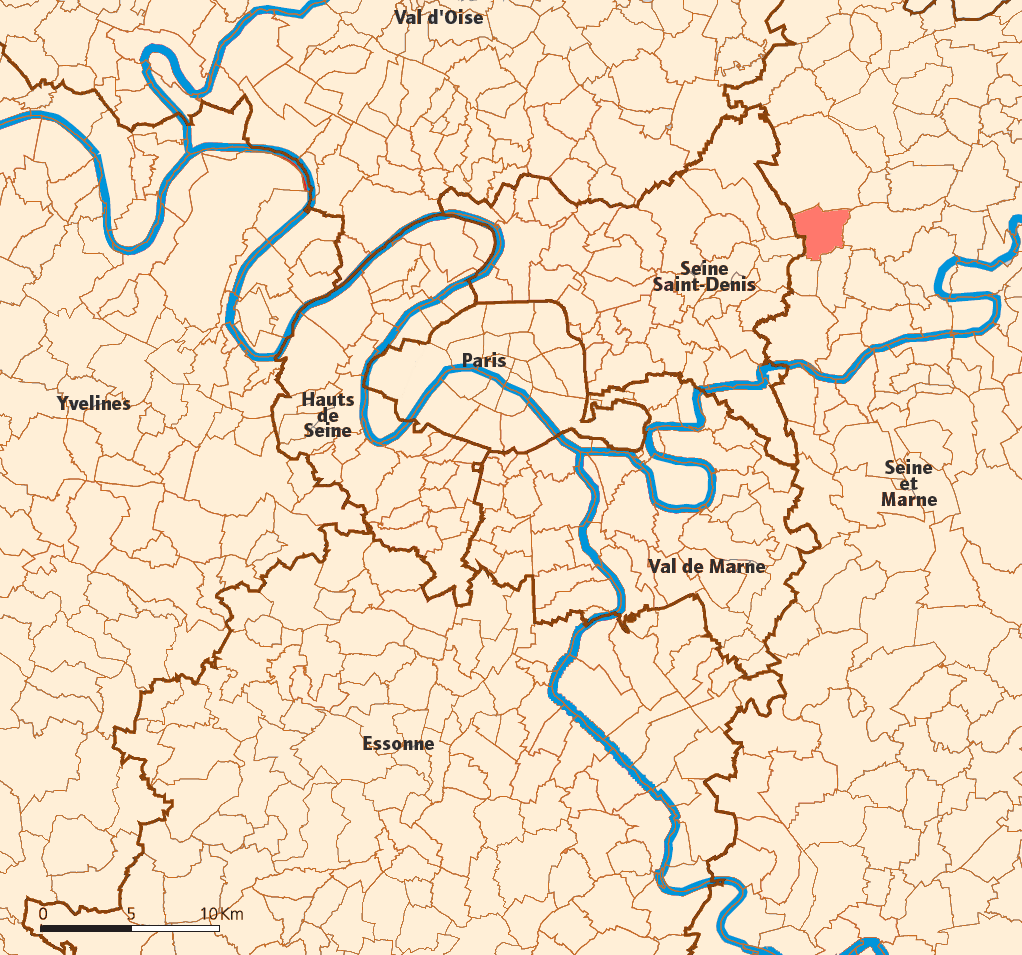
- Location (in red) within Paris inner and outer suburbs
- Location of Villeparisis
- Location within France Location within Île-de-France (region)
- Coordinates: 48°57′01″N 2°36′09″E
- Country: France
- Region: Île-de-France
- Department: Seine-et-Marne
- Arrondissement: Meaux
- Canton: Villeparisis
- Intercommunality: CA Roissy Pays de France

Government
  - Mayor (2020–2026): Frederic Bouche
- Area^{1}: 8.29 km^{2} (3.20 sq mi)
- Highest elevation: 133 m (436 ft)
- Lowest elevation: 53 m (174 ft)
- Population (2023): 26,946
  - Density: 3,250/km^{2} (8,420/sq mi)
- Time zone: UTC+01:00 (CET)
  - Summer (DST): UTC+02:00 (CEST)
- INSEE/Postal code: 77514 /77270
- ^{1} French Land Register data, which excludes lakes, ponds, glaciers > 1 km^{2} (0.386 sq mi or 247 acres) and river estuaries.

Villeparisis (French pronunciation: [vilpaʁizi]) is a commune in the Seine-et-Marne department in the Île-de-France region in north-central France. It is located in the north-eastern suburbs of Paris 21.8 km (13.5 mi) from the centre.

== History ==
The Hôtel de Ville was commissioned as a coaching inn and was completed in 1750.

== Population ==
Inhabitants of Villeparisis are called Villeparisiens in French.

Historical population

Year	Pop.	±% p.a.
1793	537	—
1800	487	−1.39%
1806	559	+2.32%
1821	525	−0.42%
1831	606	+1.45%
1836	701	+2.96%
1841	685	−0.46%
1846	737	+1.47%
1851	620	−3.40%
1856	564	−1.88%
1861	733	+5.38%
1866	902	+4.24%
1872	849	−1.00%
1876	898	+1.41%
1881	886	−0.27%
1886	853	−0.76%
1891	856	+0.07%
1896	858	+0.05%
1901	881	+0.53%

Year	Pop.	±% p.a.
1906	907	+0.58%
1911	910	+0.07%
1921	996	+0.91%
1926	3,011	+24.76%
1931	4,989	+10.63%
1936	5,585	+2.28%
1946	5,610	+0.04%
1954	7,525	+3.74%
1962	10,926	+4.77%
1968	13,470	+3.55%
1975	14,817	+1.37%
1982	16,659	+1.69%
1990	18,790	+1.52%
1999	21,296	+1.40%
2007	23,368	+1.17%
2012	25,556	+1.81%
2017	26,322	+0.59%
2023	26,946	+0.39%

Source: EHESS and INSEE (1968-2023)

== Transport ==
Villeparisis is served by Villeparisis–Mitry-le-Neuf station on Paris RER line B.

== Twin towns – sister cities ==
Villeparisis is twinned with:

- Maldon, England, United Kingdom
- Pietrasanta, Italy
- Wathlingen, Germany

== Notable people ==
- Henri Cleutin (1515–1566), diplomat

== See also ==
- Communes of the Seine-et-Marne department
