= Mitry–Claye station =

Railway station in Mitry-Mory, France

Mitry Claye
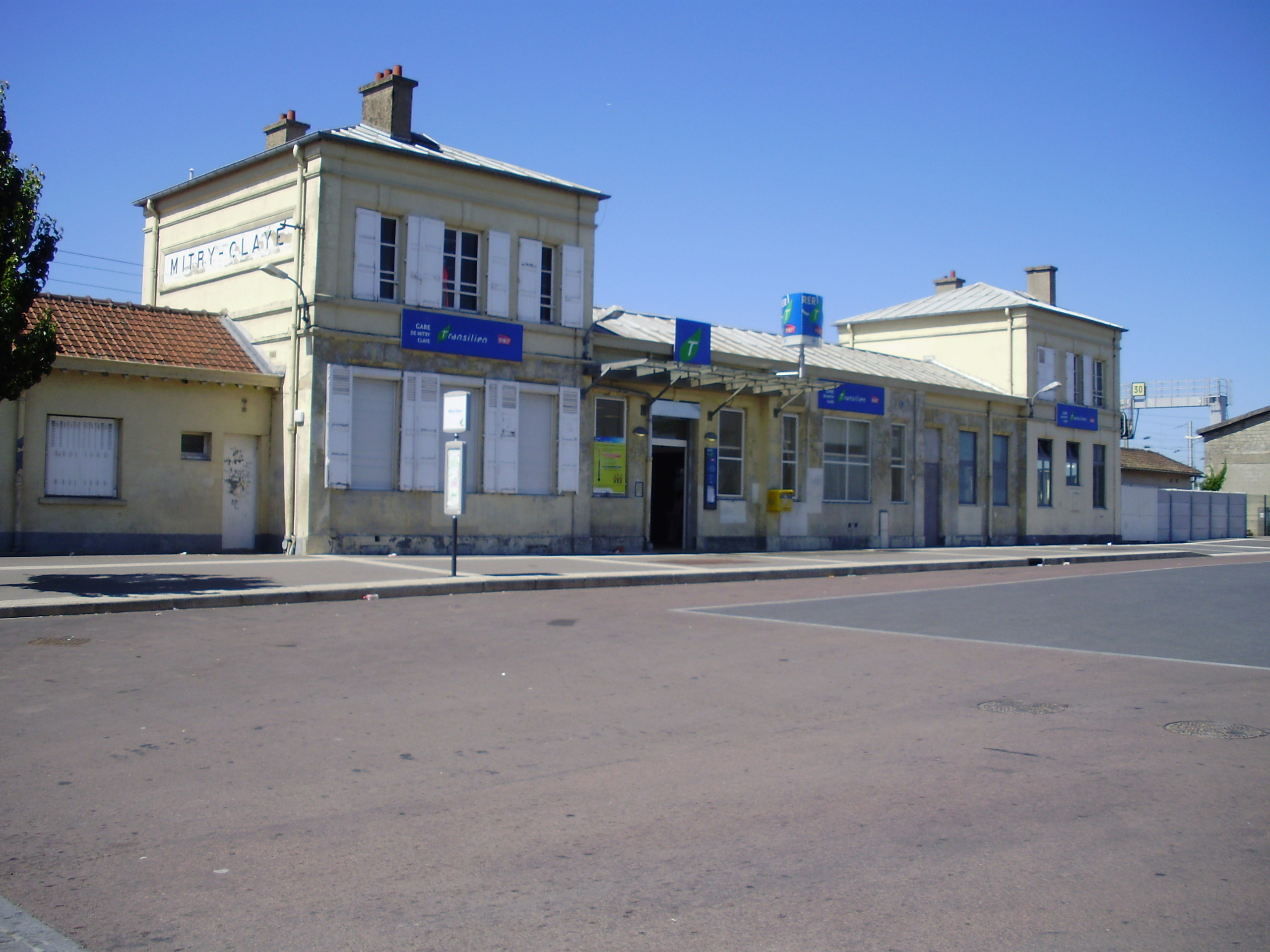
- Mitry–Claye station in 2010

General information
- Location: France
- Coordinates: 48°58′34″N 2°38′31″E
- Operator: SNCF

Construction
- Accessible: Yes, by prior reservation

Other information
- Station code: 87271528
- Fare zone: 3

Passengers
- 2024: 3,540,346

Services
Preceding station	Transilien	Following station
Aulnay-sous-Bois towards Paris-Nord	Line K	Compans towards Crépy-en-Valois
Preceding station	RER	Following station
Terminus	RER B	Villeparisis–Mitry-le-Neuf towards Robinson or Saint-Rémy-lès-Chevreuse
Location

Mitry–Claye station is a railway station near Paris, France. It is in the commune of Mitry-Mory, and also serves nearby Claye-Souilly. It is served by regional Transilien trains and the Paris RER trains, so is an important transit point.

== Bus connections ==
The station is connected with many lines of Roissy Est bus network :

- Roissy Est: 2113 2116 2120 2122 2124 2129 2130

The station is also remotely connected with two other lines at Collège Paul Langevin/Lycée Honoré de Balzac with lines 2168 2176 in addition of line 2116 .

== See also ==
- List of stations of the Paris RER
