= Oissery =

- Commune
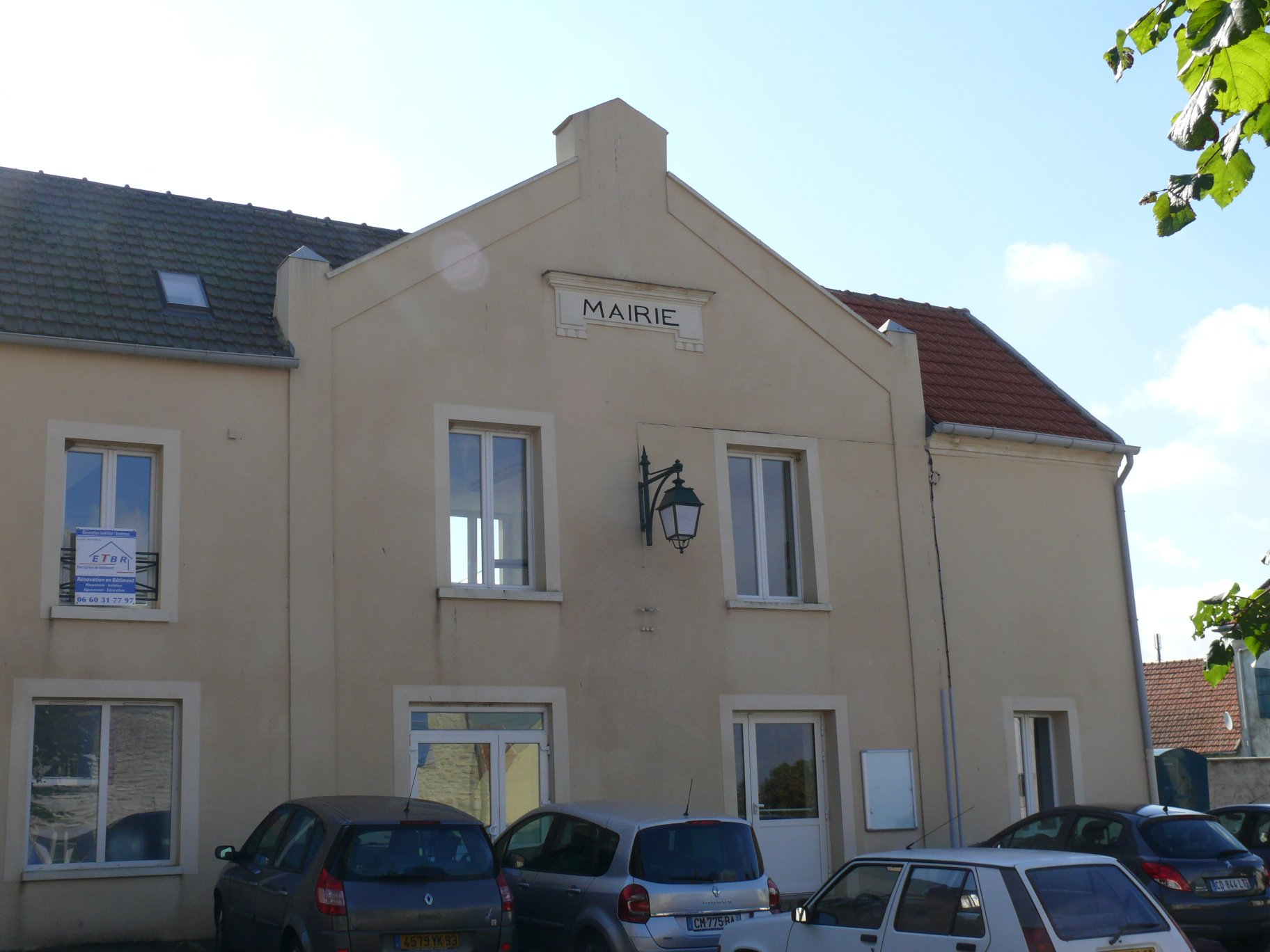
- The town hall in Oissery

- Coat of arms
- Location of Oissery
- Location within France Location within Île-de-France (region)
- Coordinates: 49°04′15″N 2°49′00″E
- Country: France
- Region: Île-de-France
- Department: Seine-et-Marne
- Arrondissement: Meaux
- Canton: Claye-Souilly
- Intercommunality: CC Plaines et Monts de France

Government
  - Mayor (2020–2026): Jean-Louis Ragon
- Area^{1}: 15.17 km^{2} (5.86 sq mi)
- Highest elevation: 122 m (400 ft)
- Lowest elevation: 81 m (266 ft)
- Population (2023): 2,496
  - Density: 164.5/km^{2} (426.1/sq mi)
- Time zone: UTC+01:00 (CET)
  - Summer (DST): UTC+02:00 (CEST)
- INSEE/Postal code: 77344 /77178
- ^{1} French Land Register data, which excludes lakes, ponds, glaciers > 1 km^{2} (0.386 sq mi or 247 acres) and river estuaries.

Oissery (French pronunciation: [wasʁi]) is a commune in the Seine-et-Marne department in the Île-de-France region in north-central France. It is around 40 km northeast of the centre of Paris.

== Population ==
Historical population
Year	Pop.	±% p.a.
1968	417	—
1975	437	+0.67%
1982	577	+4.05%
1990	1,465	+12.35%
1999	1,546	+0.60%
2007	2,144	+4.17%
2012	2,124	−0.19%
2017	2,276	+1.39%
2023	2,496	+1.55%
Source: INSEE

Inhabitants are called Ostéraciens in French.

== See also ==
- Communes of the Seine-et-Marne department
