= Gargan station =

Railway station in Les Pavillons-sous-Bois, France

Gargan
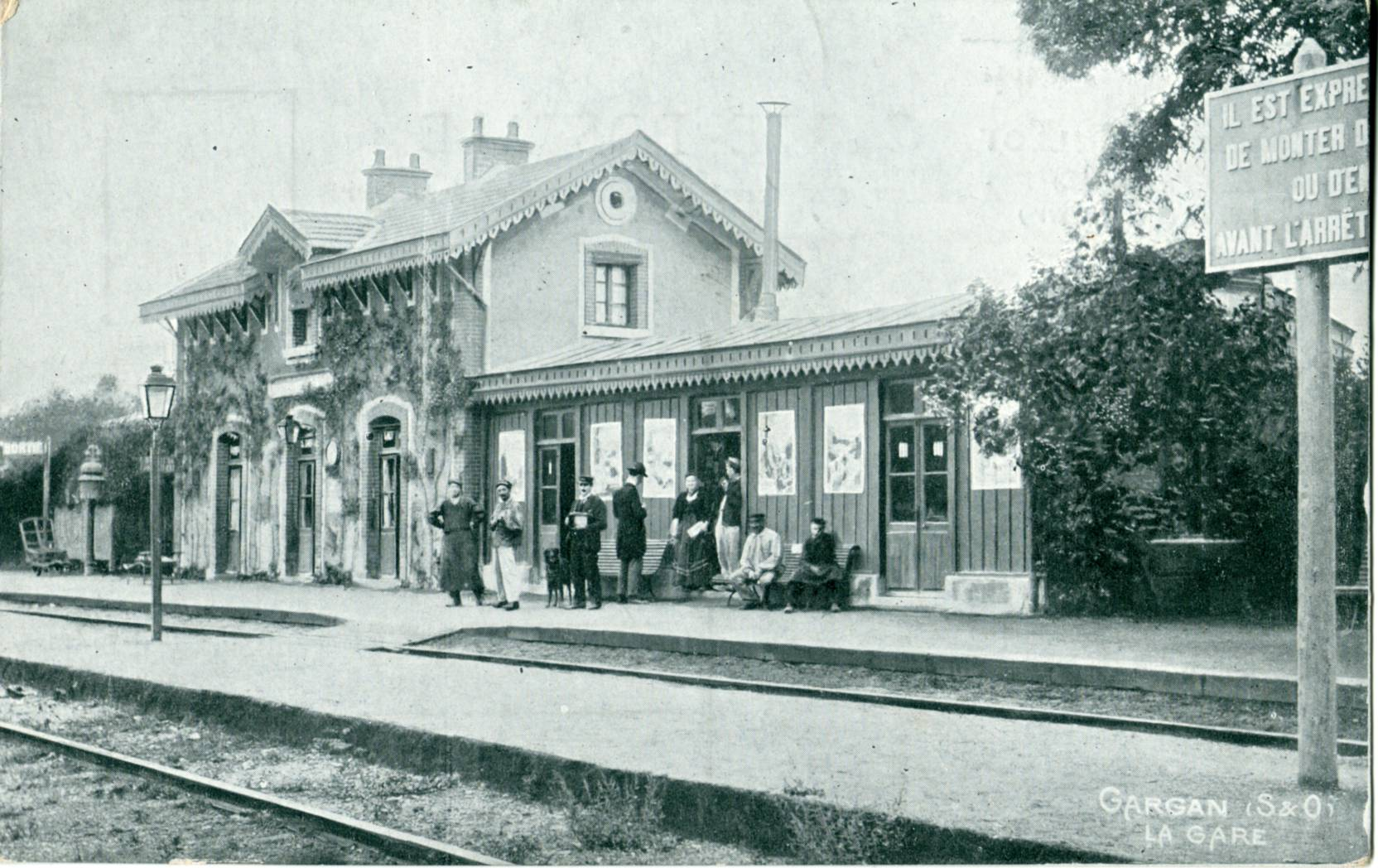
- The station in 1875.

General information
- Location: place Oissery Forfry, Les Pavillons-sous-Bois, Seine-Saint-Denis; France
- Coordinates: 48°54′30″N 2°31′02″E
- Owner: SNCF
- Line: Île-de-France tramway Line 4
- Platforms: 2 side
- Tracks: 2

Construction
- Structure type: Ground

Other information
- Station code: 8711386
- Fare zone: Zone 4

History
- Opened: 1875

Passengers
- 2024: 6,698,835

Services
Preceding station	Tram	Following station
Les Pavillons-sous-Bois towards Bondy	T4 Aulnay-sous-Bois branch	Lycée Henri Sellier towards Aulnay-sous-Bois
Les Pavillons-sous-Bois towards Bondy	T4 Montfermeil branch	République–Max Dormoy towards Hôpital de Montfermeil
Location

Gargan is a railway station located on the Île-de-France tramway Line 4 in the commune of Les Pavillons-sous-Bois, at the limit of Livry-Gargan.
