= L'Abbaye station =

Railway station in Livry-Gargan, France

Coordinates: 48.9223°N 2.5168°E

L'Abbaye
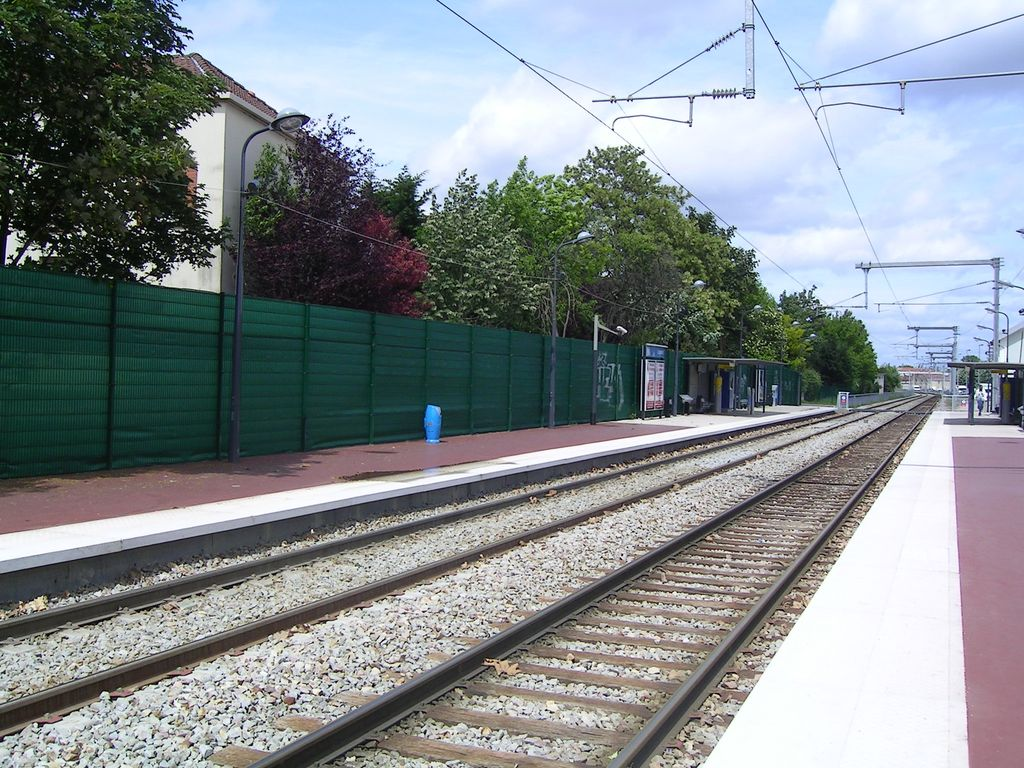

General information
- Location: place Gabriel Beillon, Livry-Gargan, Seine-Saint-Denis; France
- Owner: SNCF
- Line: Île-de-France tramway Line 4
- Platforms: 2 side
- Tracks: 2

Construction
- Structure type: Ground

Other information
- Station code: 8711388
- Fare zone: Zone 4

History
- Opened: 1875

Passengers
- 2024: 1,102,771

Services
Preceding station	Tram	Following station
Lycée Henri Sellier towards Bondy	T4 Aulnay-sous-Bois branch	Freinville – Sevran towards Aulnay-sous-Bois
Location

L'Abbaye is a railway station located on the Île-de-France tramway Line 4 in the commune of Livry-Gargan.
