= Lycée Henri Sellier station =

Railway station in Livry-Gargan, France

Coordinates: 48.9160°N 2.5151°E

Lycée Henri Sellier
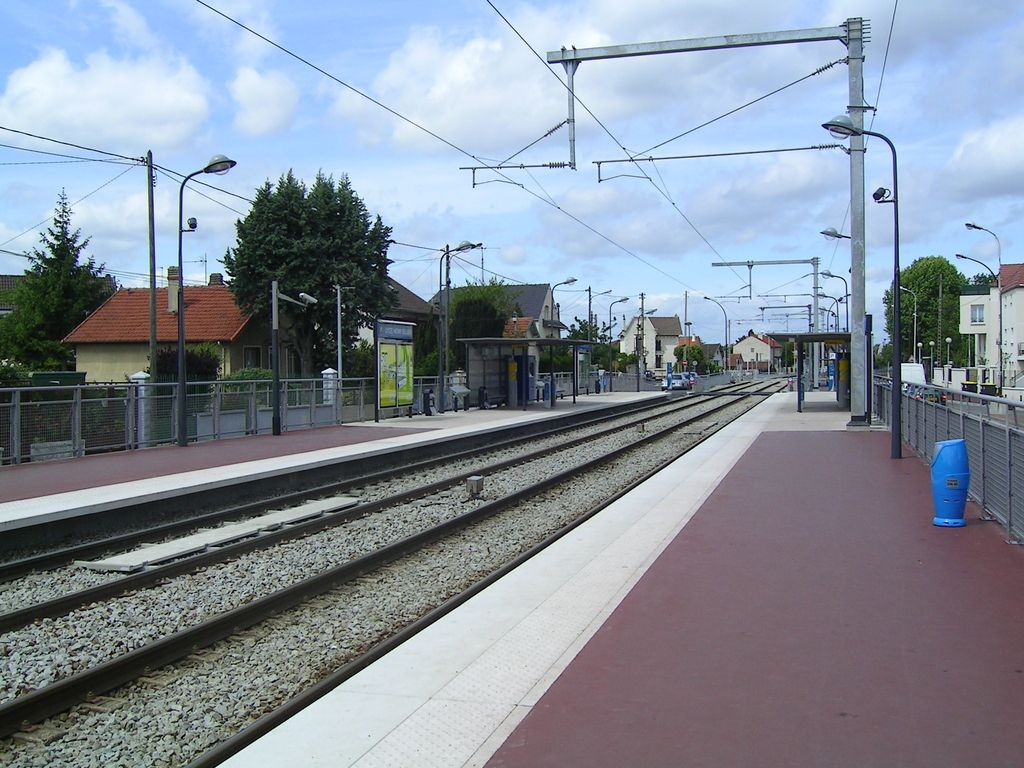

General information
- Location: boulevard Maurice Berteaux, Livry-Gargan, Seine-Saint-Denis; France
- Owner: SNCF
- Line: Île-de-France tramway Line 4
- Platforms: 2 side
- Tracks: 2

Construction
- Structure type: Ground

Other information
- Station code: 8798871
- Fare zone: Zone 4

History
- Opened: 18 November 2006

Passengers
- 2024: 1,934,000

Services
Preceding station	Tram	Following station
Gargan towards Bondy	T4 Aulnay-sous-Bois branch	L'Abbaye towards Aulnay-sous-Bois
Location

Lycée Henri Sellier is a railway station located on the Île-de-France tramway Line 4 in the commune of Livry-Gargan. The station is named after the eponymous school situated nearby.
