= Freinville–Sevran station =

Railway station in Sevran, France

Coordinates: 48.9267°N 2.5190°E

Freinville–Sevran
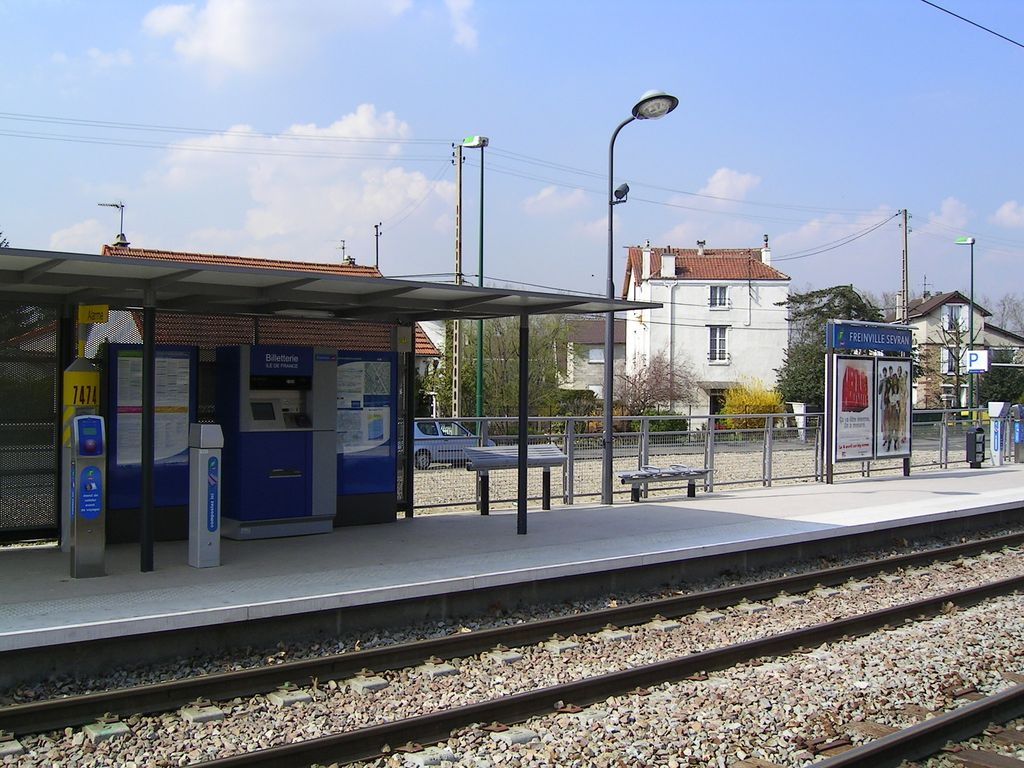

General information
- Location: boulevard d'Aulnay, Sevran, Seine-Saint-Denis; France
- Owner: SNCF
- Line: Île-de-France tramway Line 4
- Platforms: 2 side
- Tracks: 2

Construction
- Structure type: Ground

Other information
- Station code: 8711389
- Fare zone: Zone 4

History
- Opened: 1899

Passengers
- 2024: 2,264,457

Services
Preceding station	Tram	Following station
L'Abbaye towards Bondy	T4 Aulnay-sous-Bois branch	Rougemont – Chanteloup towards Aulnay-sous-Bois
Location

Freinville–Sevran is a railway station located on the Île-de-France tramway Line 4 in the commune of Sevran. It was originally commissioned in 1899 by the Chemins de fer de l'Est to serve the Westinghouse Electric Corporation workshops.
