= Les Coquetiers station =

Railway station in Villemomble, France

Coordinates: 48.8925°N 2.4992°E

Les Coquetiers
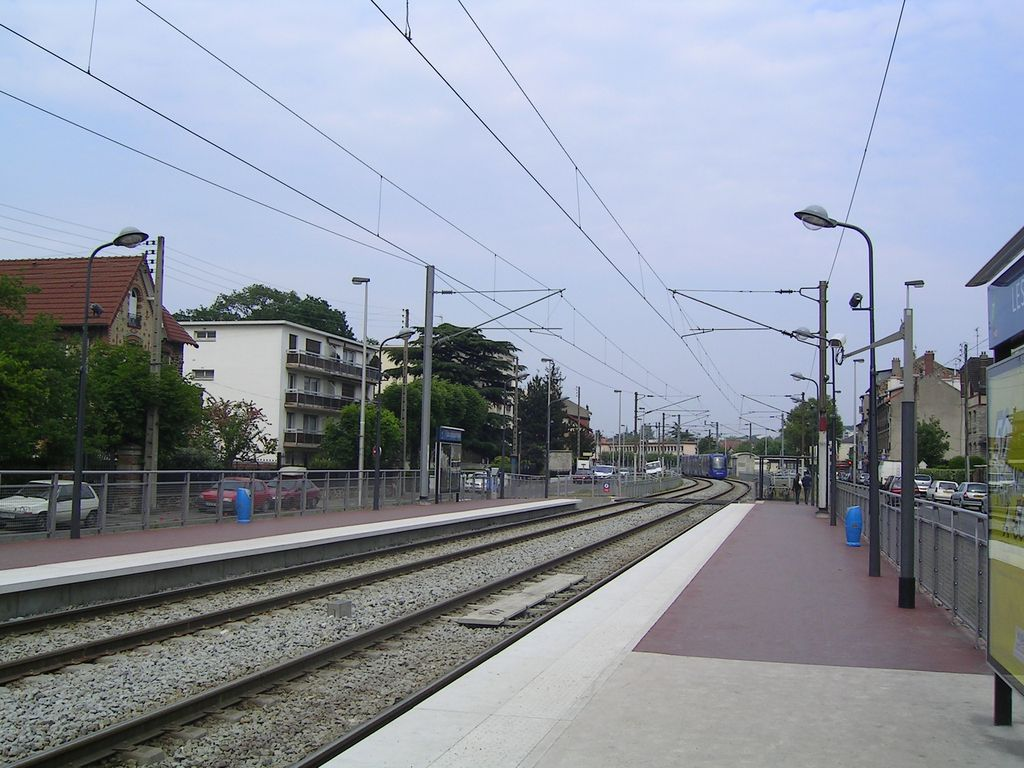

General information
- Location: boulevard d'Aulnay, Villemomble, Seine-Saint-Denis; France
- Owner: SNCF
- Line: Île-de-France tramway Line 4
- Platforms: 2 side
- Tracks: 2

Construction
- Structure type: Ground

Other information
- Station code: 8711384
- Fare zone: Zone 4

History
- Opened: 18 November 2006

Passengers
- 2024: 1,386,734

Services
| Preceding station | Tram | Following station |
|---|---|---|
| Remise à Jorelle towards Bondy | T4 | Allée de la Tour–Rendez-Vous towards Aulnay-sous-Bois or Hôpital de Montfermeil |
Location

Les Coquetiers is a railway station located on the Île-de-France tramway Line 4 in the commune of Villemomble.
