= Île-de-France tramway Line 4 =

Suburban tram-train line in Seine-Saint-Denis, northeast of Paris

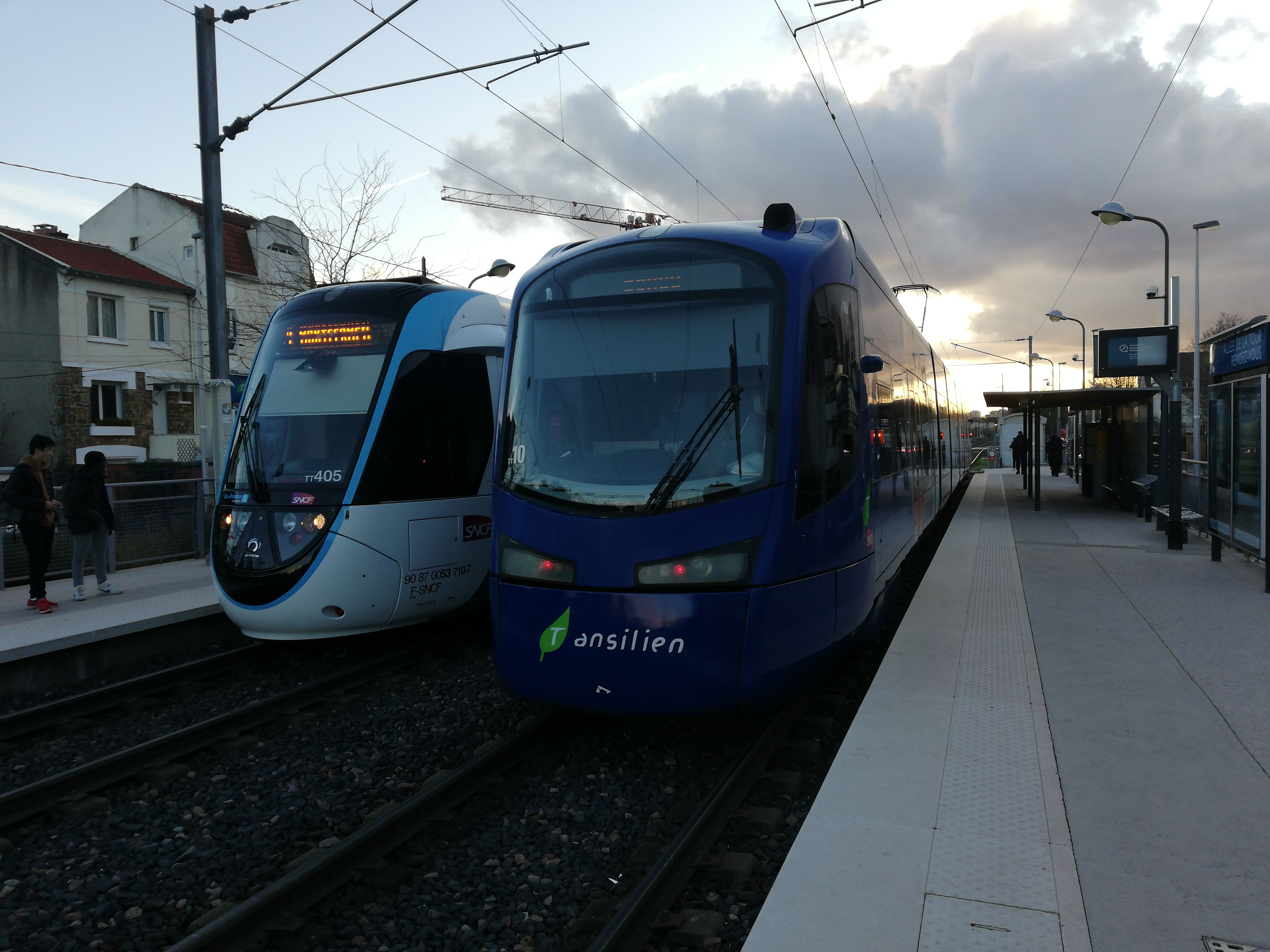
- Both types of rolling stock used on the Île-de-France tramway Line 4 at Allée de la Tour–Rendez-Vous station

Overview
- Owner: Île-de-France Mobilités
- Termini: Aulnay-sous-Bois & Montfermeil; Bondy
- Stations: 20

Service
- Type: Tram-train
- System: Tramways in Île-de-France
- Operator: SNCF (Transilien)
- Rolling stock: 15 Siemens Avanto/S70 (U 25500); 15 Alstom Citadis Dualis (U 53700)
- Daily ridership: 72,000 (early 2020)

History
- Opened: 20 November 2006; 19 years ago

Technical
- Line length: 13.3 km (8.3 mi)
- Track gauge: 1,435 mm (4 ft 8 1/2 in) standard gauge
- Electrification: Overhead line, 750 V DC
- Operating speed: 70 km/h (43 mph)
Route map
Original proposal
Alternate proposed routings

Île-de-France tramway Line 4, also called the T4, is an 13.3-kilometre (8.3 mi) long tram-train line in the Seine-Saint-Denis department of Île-de-France. The line starts at Aulnay-sous-Bois and features two branches, with the first running to Bondy (opened 20 November 2006) and the second running to Montfermeil (opened 14 December 2019 and 31 August 2020).

The line is operated by SNCF, which brands it as part of its Transilien network. The operation of line will become subject to a competitive bidding process in November 2029, which will be overseen by Île-de-France Mobilités.

It is the result of the transformation and installation of a double-track on the Bondy to Aulnay-sous-Bois line, or ligne des Coquetiers ("Egg Cup Line"), which opened in 1875. It thus became the first French tram-train line, an event whose true significance emerged during plans to expand it into a tramway and integrate it into the urban transport network.

== History ==
=== The ligne des Coquetiers ===
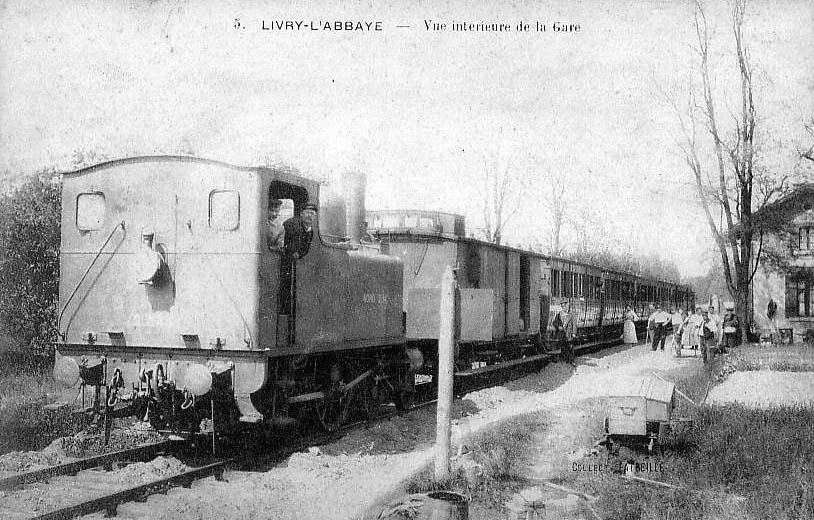
A train arriving at l'Abbaye during the Compagnie du Bondy-Aulnay era.

Line 4 of the Île-de-France tramway was known as the Bondy à Aulnay-sous-Bois rail line, or ligne des Coquetiers, and has linked the Nord and Est rail networks between Aulnay-sous-Bois and Bondy since 1875.

The "Egg Cup Line" fell into disuse because of the line's limited area and lacklustre service, which caused many traffic problems at its rail crossings. In 1993, the SNCF implemented some changes to reduce closure times at rail crossings and increase train frequency during rush hour (a train every fifteen minutes between Bondy and Gargan and every thirty minutes between Gargan and Aulnay-sous-Bois). However, they failed to make the line more appealing to potential users, who remained uninterested because of its insufficient service level and the excessive length of the train's route.

The line was thus shut down in December 2003 for major renovations to transform it into a hybrid between a train and an urban tramway: the tram-train.

=== Transformation of the Line ===
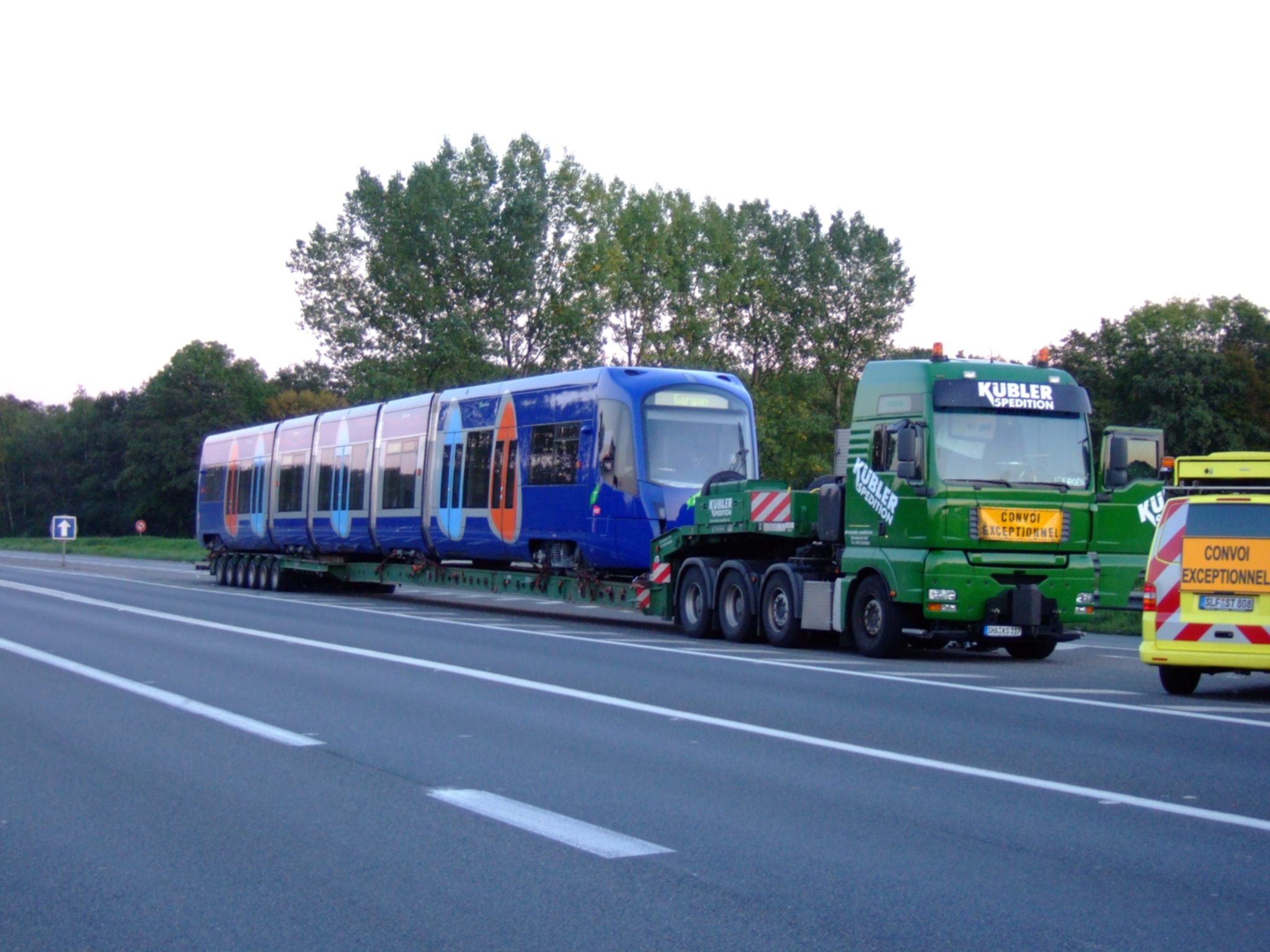
Delivery of the line's first U 25500 trains.

The development of the tram-train concept inspired plans to reinvigorate the ligne des Coquetiers using this system that seemed ideal. It solved the problems caused by the rail crossings by transforming them into simple road junctions. It reduced disruptions in the urban landscape and expanded the use of trams in urban transportation all while greatly increasing service. This technology was finally adopted, and in 2001 the SNCF called for European tenders for the trains and cars. In 2003 the draft was approved by the STIF, SNCF, and RFF.

==== Objectives ====
Plan of the new line's tracks.

The work aimed to:

- increase service throughout the day until 8 P.M., with trains scheduled every six minutes Monday to Saturday and every nine minutes on Sundays and statutory holidays. Between 8 P.M. and 10 P.M., trains were to be scheduled every nine minutes and every twelve minutes from 10 P.M. until the end of service. Service was also to be decreased for six weeks during the summer, from approximately 14 July to 31 August;
- build new stations to better respond to user demand;
- reduce disruptions of the urban landscape by railways by integrating tramways into cities in collaboration with the Seine-Saint-Denis department and the communes it travels through; and
- modify urban transportation networks by reducing wait times at signalized rail crossings.

The evolution toward urban transport modes was accompanied by physical modifications to the rail line by:

- doubling the track between Gargan and Aulnay-sous-Bois, rebuilding the overpass on RN 3, and enlarging the Rougemont Bridge on the Canal de l'Ourcq;
- building a new terminus at Bondy Station with an additional track;
- eliminating passenger buildings and turning rail stations into tramway-style stops. Only Gargan Station services trains since it houses the line's operations centre, where a central track leads to train storage;
- building three additional stops:
  - Remise à Jorelle between Bondy and Les Coquetiers;
  - Lycée Henri Sellier between Gargan and L'Abbaye ; and
  - Rougemont – Chanteloup between Freinville – Sevran and Aulnay-sous-Bois; and
- turning rail crossings into road junctions with signalization that conforms to the highway code.

==== Work ====
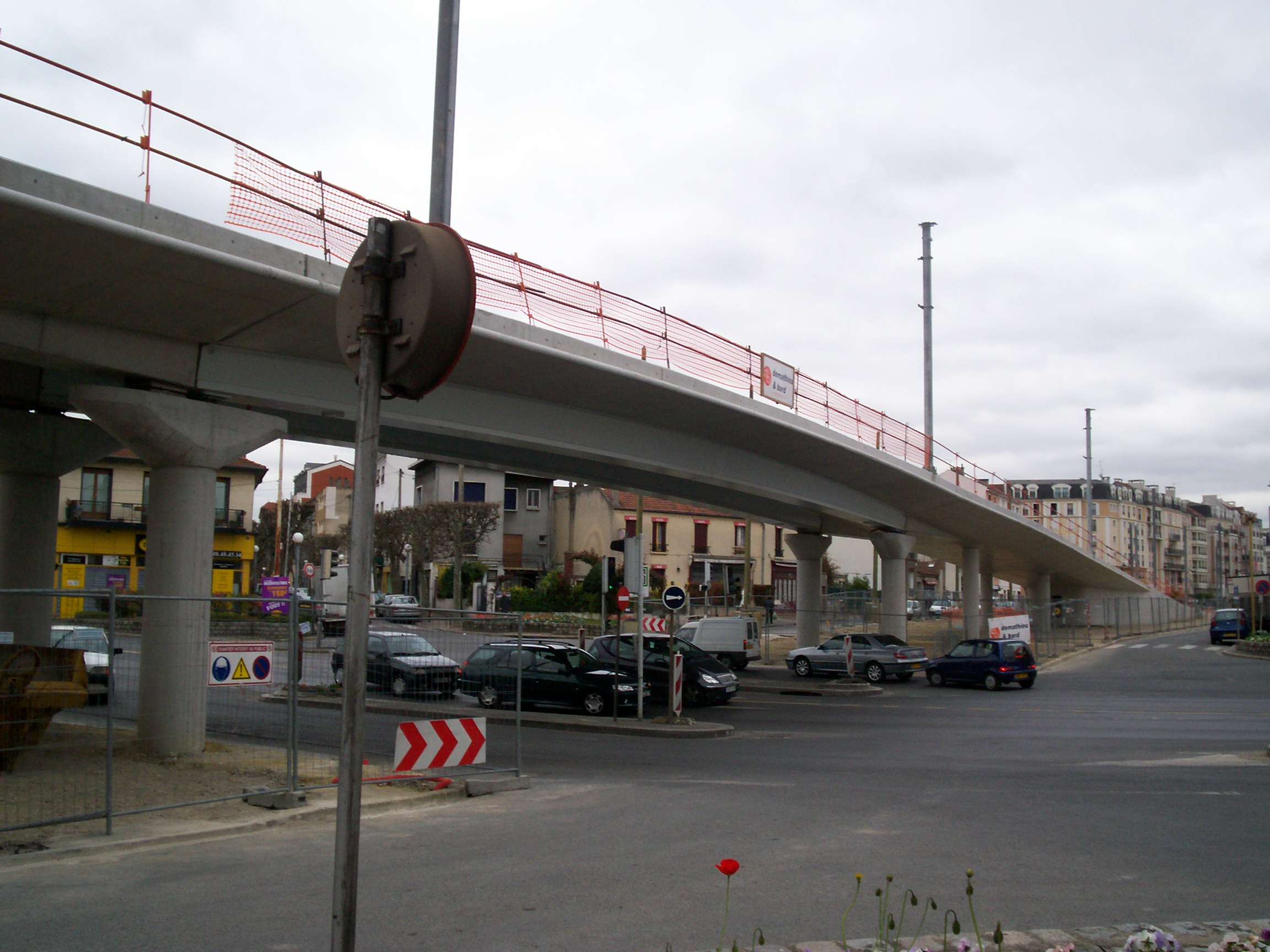
The new two-lane overpass from the ex-RN3 under construction in 2006.

Construction began in June 2004. The entire track was removed and reinstalled, the stations' platforms were demolished and rebuilt, the 25 kV catenary was rewired, and the Gargan-Aulnay section was made into a double-track. To do so, the Rougemont Bridge on the Canal de l'Ourcq was widened, and in June 2005 the RN3 overpass, which was built in 1932 as a single line, had a walkway installed.

Six months later, in January 2006, the biggest operation took place in front of many onlookers: the new double-track overpass' walkway was installed overnight after traffic was blocked on the ex-RN3. That same summer, the first train cars were sent by oversize load and put on the line for technical and safety tests.

==== Cost ====
The T4 project was a part of the twelfth State-Region contract agreement. Financing for the transformation of the ligne des Coquetiers into the T4 Line, which totalled €52.72 million (January 2003 cost), was shared between:

- the Île-de-France Regional Council: 46.94%;
- the French government: 23.47%;
- the RFF: 18.52% (which was partially soft loans from the Île-de-France Region);
- the Seine-Saint-Denis General Council: 9.26%;
- the SNCF: 1.82% (from soft loans from the Île-de-France Region).

The SNCF paid for the fifteen cars that were needed to operate on the line: a total of 68 million euros. The annual cost of running the line is 11.2 million euros, which are provided by the STIF.

=== Tram-train ===
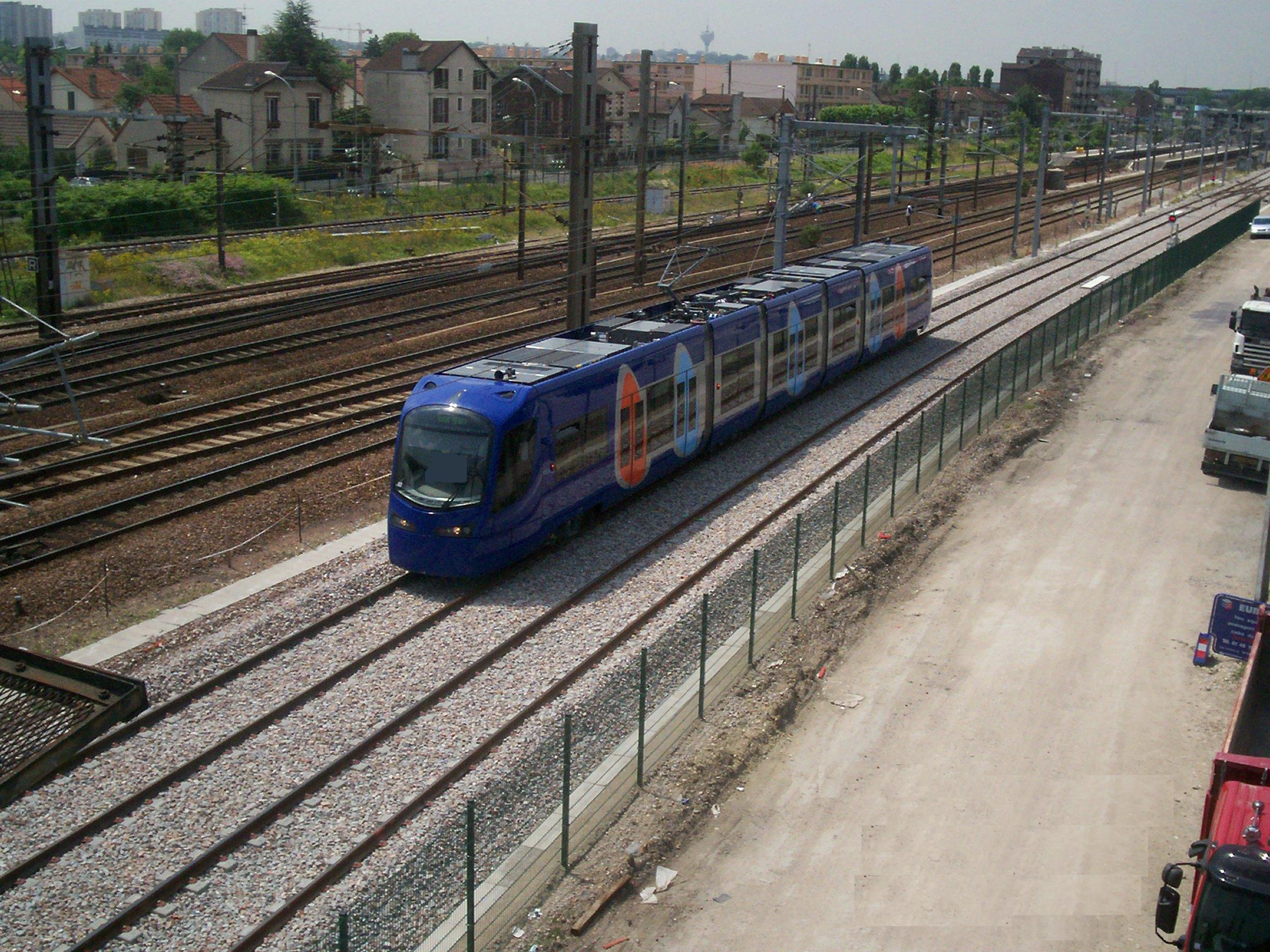
A U 25500 between Bondy and Remise à Jorelle during the pre-inaugural trials. We can clearly see the train's ballasted tracks, which are unlike most tram rails. The line is a hybrid between a tramway and a train line.

Line 4 of the Île-de-France tramway was inaugurated on Saturday, 18 November 2006, and was free of charge the entire weekend. Its true commercial operation began the morning of 20 November 2006.

The T4 is the Île-de-France network's fourth line and France's first tram-train line. It is the first of its kind to be operated by the SNCF. Unlike the other Île-de-France tramway lines, which are operated by RATP, this line is operated by the SNCF, which may seem surprising. The SNCF left the ligne des Moulineaux (now T2), which was then in disrepair and highly unprofitable, to the RATP during the 1990s.

The SNCF's policy was to concentrate on heavy fluxes of passengers and thus on heavy rail transit. The success of tramway networks and the increasing popularity of peri-urban transportation made the SNCF change its focus.

There are no plans to extend the line to Noisy-le-Sec. This would allow passengers to reach this multimodal hub and connect with the T1, the RER E (both the Tournan and Chelles-Gournay branches), the Tangentielle Nord, and a fortiori toward Paris.

The RATP's expansion of the T2 from Puteaux to La Défense on existing roadbeds contributed to the enormous success of that line. Despite this, the ability to operate with a 25 kV catenary is needed to reach the Noisy-le-Sec depot. The trains' dual-current abilities (25 kV / 750 V) were not used until 2019, since the entire line was powered with 25 kV initially.

The line is used by fifteen tram-train cars, which run on the right as mandated by the Code of Conduct. It takes nineteen minutes to travel the eight-kilometre line. As stated in its regulations, the cars and stations are carefully analyzed to make them easily accessible for the disabled.

==== Criticism ====
Despite the complete improvement of the service, the line's operations have not gone without criticism. On its initial day, 18 November 2006, two trains had damaged brakes, which caused the SNCF to interrupt service during the late afternoon, forcing many users to continue their trip on foot or by hitchhiking.

Many other aspects of the new line drew complaints. The frequent use of audio warning devices by train operators caused friction between nearby residents and elected officials on the one hand and the SNCF on the other. This nuisance led to the creation of a collective of residents and local politicians who successfully reduced the volume of the audio devices by 15 dB in mid-March 2007. Safety policies have since changed and the devices' use is now limited to when there is immediate danger.

Other users have complained about conceptual errors or unfinished infrastructure. Some pedestrian walkways remained inaccessible a year after the line opened; disabled people were unable to access certain points because of stairs; and the number of arches to store bicycles in the proposed shelters were reduced. The disappearance of some old passenger buildings against the wishes of some municipalities also caused controversy. A group supported by the municipalities was able to save Les Coquetiers and L'Abbaye stations, but the L'Allée de la Tour Rendez-Vous building was destroyed. A bicycle path was built along the line starting in spring 2008 and was opened in the beginning of 2010.

==== Service Improvements ====
Video of a U 25500 in Sevran.

Service improvements were implemented on 8 December 2007. From then on, from 10 P.M. until the end of service, the tramway began connecting with the RER B train at Aulnay and the RER E at Bondy. Since that date, the line has been in service the nights of 31 December and the Fête de la musique.

However, no changes are planned for the nearby bus routes that lead to the tramway, which could allow the line to reach its objective of 40,000 passengers a day. In October 2007, the line only carried 29,000 passengers daily and 30,000 in 2009.

=== Expansion Project ===
==== Controversy: 2006–2013 ====
The STIF has been planning to split the T4 tram-train toward the Clichy-Montfermeil plateau to serve the housing estates in these cities since 2003. It is one of the main plans for the Île-de-France region that were approved in 2008.

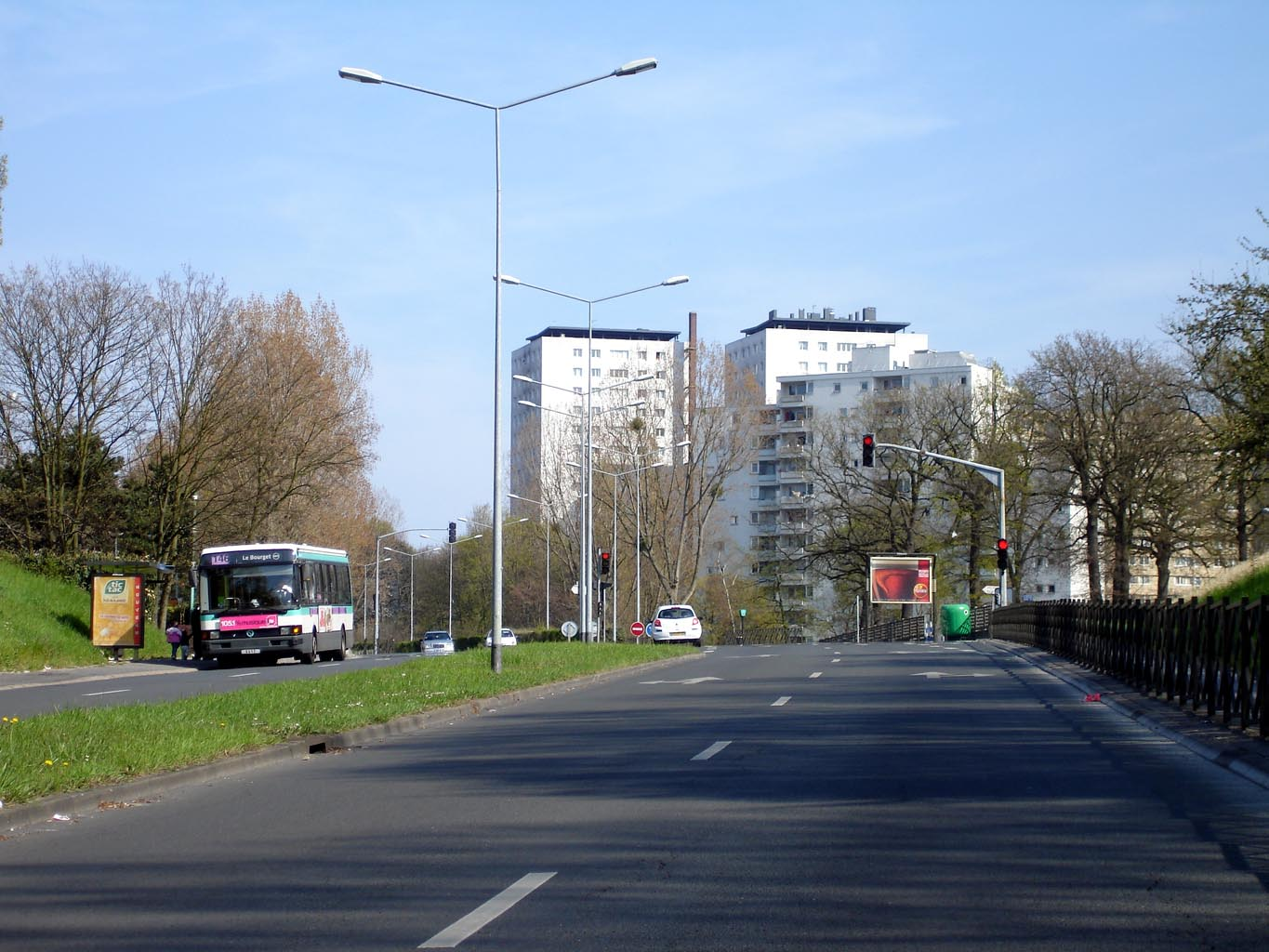
Gagarine Boulevard in Clichy-sous-Bois, a potential path for a branch in the T4.

It would allow residents of Clichy-sous-Bois, Montfermeil, and nearby communes to reach Bondy (RER E) or Aulnay-sous-Bois (RER B) much faster than they currently do using the bus. It would create a new way to access major employment centres such as the Roissy-Charles-de-Gaulle Airport.

Nevertheless, this extension was opposed by some of the cities it would cross (Livry-Gargan and Les Pavillons-sous-Bois). Since the 2008 municipal elections, the mayors of these cities have largely been against the project. The mayors did not want to oppose the electorate, who were unwilling to deal with the nuisances that would be caused by the expansion (noise, traffic, and the proximity of the plateau's disadvantaged population to their homes—particularly young people from housing estates). This political impasse led to the publication of a leaflet and a protest by the plateau's elected representatives on the day of the tram-train's inauguration by officials.

During the Aulnay-Bondy T4 inauguration, Philippe Dallier, the Pavillons-sous-Bois mayor and Seine-Saint-Denis senator, reiterated that in 2000, Bondy's Socialist mayor (1995–2011) Gilbert Roger and he had written an e-mail signed by commune mayors from Pantin to Clichy-sous-Bois and Montfermeil requesting bus lanes on the former RN3. According to him, this proposal would have both solved the public transportation issue in the Clichy-Montfermeil plateau and dealt with the congestion on the route nationale that packed buses travelled with difficulty.

The STIF's T Zen 3 project, a bus rapid transit service, was selected to improve public transportation in the communes crossed by the former RN3 from Porte de Pantin to Les Pavillons-sous-Bois. The new T4 branch will therefore open up plateau cities, particularly Clichy-sous-Bois and Montfermeil.

Other politicians regularly called for the separation, which according to them was essential to open up these populated areas. This was the case for Regional Councillor and President of the STIF's Investment and Contact State-Region Plan Follow-up Commission (Commission des investissements et du suivi du contrat de plan État-Région), Alain Amédro, who requested the inclusion of the separation in the contract signed by the Region and Seine-Saint-Denis department. Similarly, Claude Dilain, the mayor of Clichy-sous-Bois (1995–2011), asked that the region finally start planning the branch.

Fadela Amara, Secretary of State for Municipal Affairs (2007–2010), traveled to Clichy-sous-Bois on 9 November 2007, by RER and bus from Paris so she could assess the length and quality of public transportation from the capital. She thus stated, "I will do everything to make the work start as soon as possible."

The vice-president of the Region (1998–2010) and the STIF, Serge Méry, thus asked the French government to finance 30% of the project's cost, which would allow work to begin in 2011. By default, the Île-de-France Region would ask the Seine-Saint-Denis department for financing.

The Île-de-France 2007–2013 State-Region project contracts already have planned funding for studies to "determine in 2010 what operations can be awarded credits for substantial progress before" 2013.

In July 2008, the STIF approved the main objectives and characteristics dossier of the expansion. Two routes were retained out of the six that were studied:

- One was based around a double branch between Gargan and Lycée Henri-Sellier Stations, with a new 5.8-kilometre (3.6 mi) urban stretch with ten stations to be used by an estimated 5.7 million commuters by 2015 at a cost of 209 million euros.
- The alternative included only one branch toward Aulnay-sous-Bois at Freinville-Sevran Station, with a new 6.7-kilometre (4.2 mi)-long route with ten stations, to be used by an estimated 5.4 million commuters by 2015 at a cost of 220 million euros.

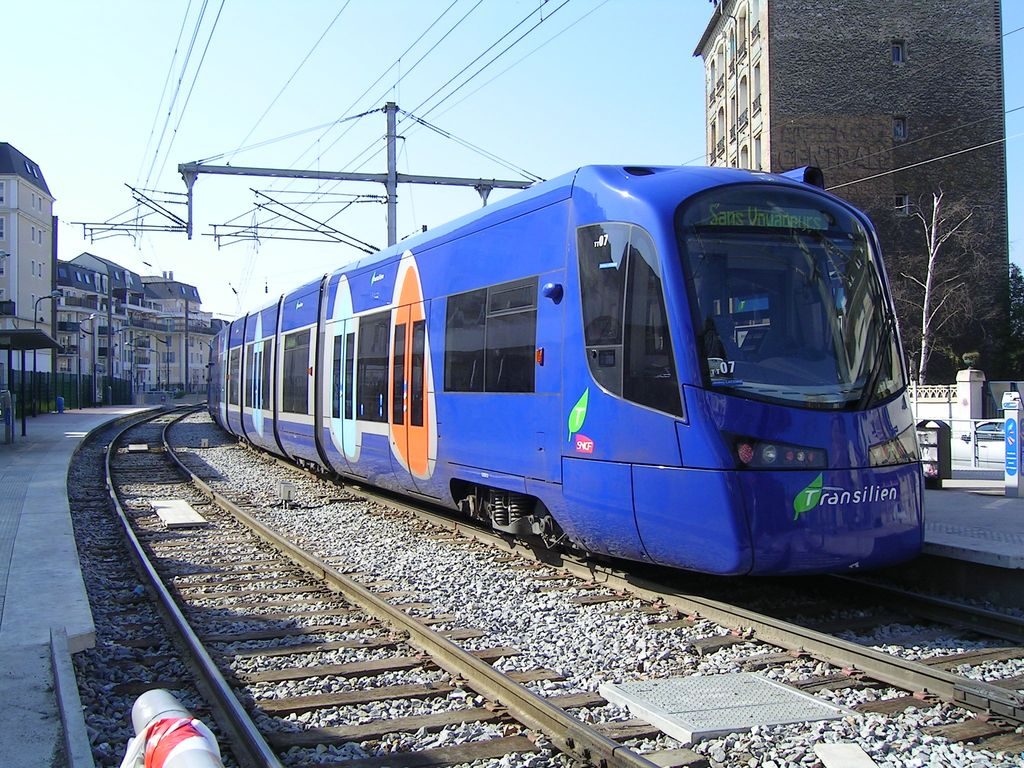
The U 25500 TT07 car setting off at Gargan, the future location of the hump for a new branch.

The proposed routes that crossed Le Raincy and Les Pavillons-sous-Bois were not included in this document. However, the Livry-Gargan commune requested that the CNDP present all the proposed routes created during the feasibility studies at the preliminary public debates and discussions. Consultations were postponed until 2009 because of a protest stating that all variants must be presented.

On 10 June 2009, a banner demanding the tram was attached to the front of the Clichy-sous-Bois and Montfermeil City Halls and a website was launched by the Clichy-sous-Bois / Montfermeil urban conglomeration community (CACM). These were the turning points for these two cities to support the tram.

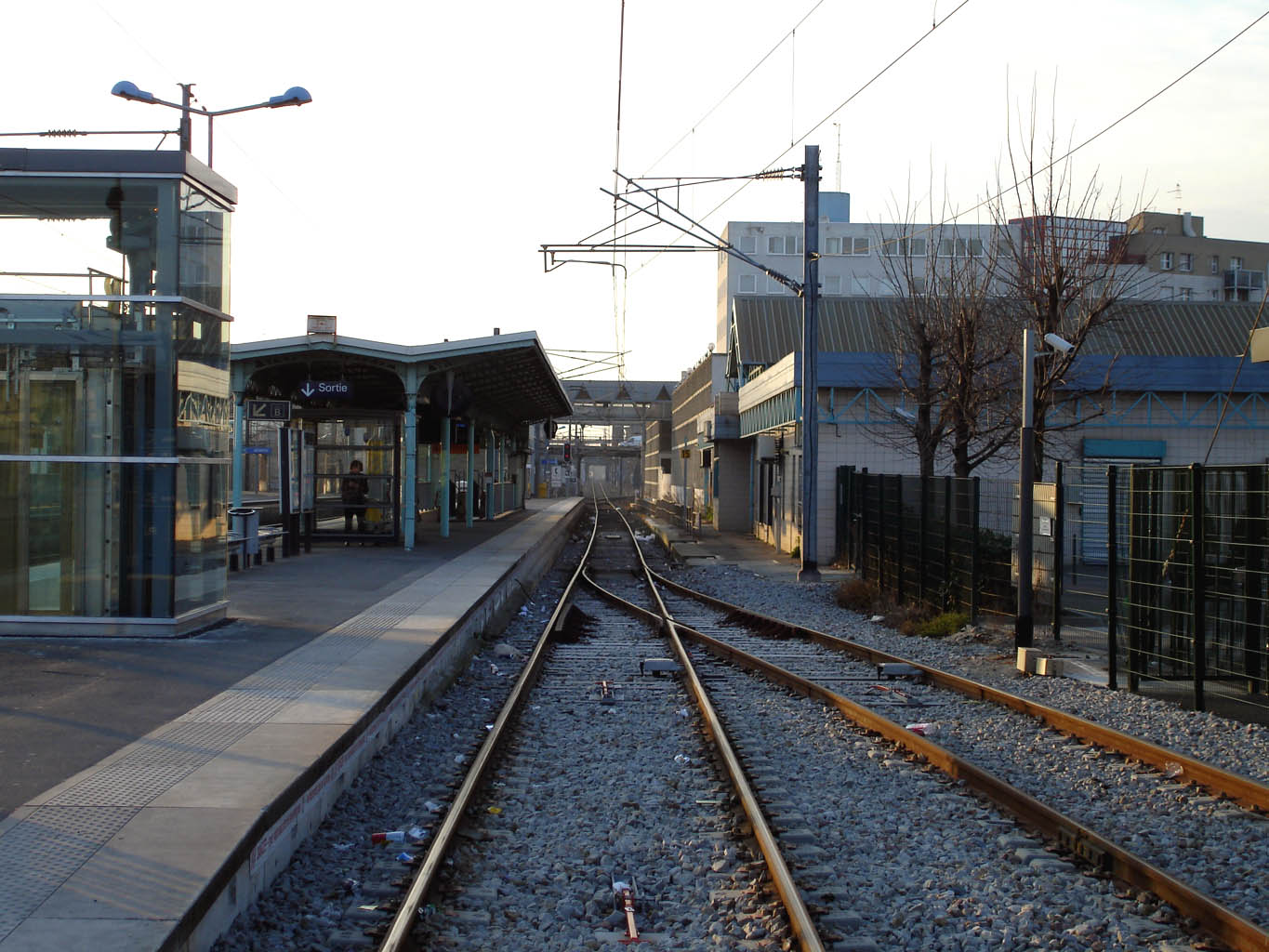
The view from Bondy Station of the tracks toward Noisy-le-Sec.

The official consultation ran from 1 September 2009 to 31 October 2009. This consultation confirmed the advantages of the project even though its impact would only be further analyzed in the study's next phases. All seven variants were presented. The STIF decided to proceed with studies and consultations based on the two most appropriate proposals (no 3 and no 4), both of which included a branch toward Bondy, to analyze the consequences on the line's operations and automobile traffic. Proposals that avoided Bas-Clichy or that had longer travel times were largely rejected during the discussions. The "0" proposal, which was called historic, was rejected because of the difficulties of inserting rails on Roy Boulevard and on the former RN3.

Follow-up studies were prepared throughout 2010. The studies were split between the project's actors: the STIF managed the insertion studies (including traffic studies); the RFF took care of rail studies; and the SNCF executed operations studies.

In 2011, public workshops were organized in Montfermeil and Livry-Gargan to inform the population about work progress and start a dialogue with project owners to refine the project and gather residents' opinions.

A public inquiry was held between 10 December 2012, and 24 January 2013, in eight communes chosen by the board of inquiry. Les Pavillons-sous-Bois, Livry-Gargan, Clichy-sous-Bois, and Montfermeil were chosen because they would be crossed by the new infrastructure, while Villemomble, Le Raincy, Bondy, and Noisy-le-Sec (for access to its maintenance and storage facilities) were selected because they would be affected by the doubling of the T4's service at the Bondy-Montfermeil connection.

The board gave a clean opinion of the declaration of public utility of the new T4 branch and had three recommendations.

==== Final Layout ====
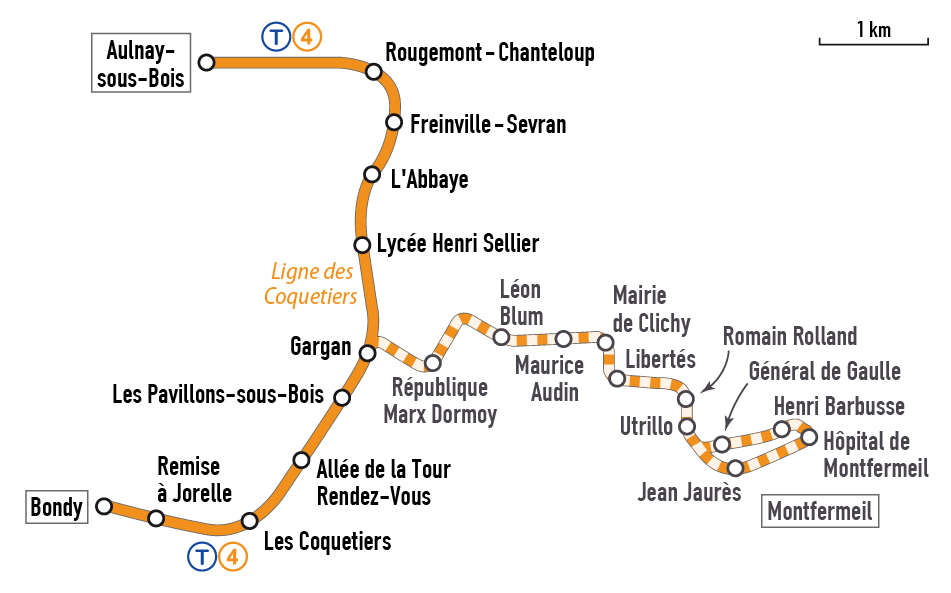
Line 4 with extension

Layout no 4 was adopted by the STIF Council on 11 April 2012. The new T4 branch will therefore create a direct route between Clichy-sous-Bois and Montfermeil. It will connect with the RER E and the forthcoming Line 15 of the Grand Paris Express in Bondy and the forthcoming Line 16 of the same network in Montfermeil.

This 6-kilometre (3.7 mi)-long route includes eleven new stations built on average of every 400 to 600 metres (1,300 to 2,000 ft); an estimated 38,000 passengers are expected to travel daily along the section between Bondy and Montfermeil. Service between Bondy and Montfermeil will be as frequent as between Aulnay and Bondy, or every six minutes. On the route between Bondy and Gargan, where passengers can alternately connect with the Bondy-Aulnay and Bondy-Montfermeil tramways, service will be doubled. The average length of the route between Bondy and Montfermeil is estimated at slightly less than thirty minutes.

The branch's power supply for both overhead supply and the station comes via 4 substations that transform a 20,000V AC supply to 750V DC. Substations are located on boulevard Marx-Dormoy in Livry-Gargan, on allée Maurice-Audin in Clichy-sous-Bois, on rue Notre-Dame-des-Anges and on rue du 8-Mai-1945 at the Hôpital station in Montfermeil.

The cost of the T4 branch project is estimated at 214 million euros (excluding taxes), with an additional 60 million euros (excluding taxes) for rolling stock at January 2011 rates.

==== New T4 Branch Project Participants ====
The new T4 branch project is one of the first managed by the Île-de-France Mobilités.

As the head of the entire project, it oversees deadlines and costs. It is also the project owner of the new urban section; it manages communications and actively seeks dialogue with concerned communes.

It entrusted part of the project ownership to:

- the RFF for infrastructure elements from the national rail network; and
- the SNCF for materials related to transportation services operations.

==== Construction ====
Work on the branch was originally planned to have commenced at the end of 2014, with the eventual commissioning to occur in 2017. However the opening was postponed ultimately to 2019, due to the delay in the completion of studies and the need to carry out additional work at Bondy station causing continual extensions of deadlines.

Preparatory work started in January 2015. Infrastructure works started on October 18, 2016.

The project of adding the branch line to Montfermeil also required considerable works at the Bondy terminus and the Gargan station. The platforms of the Bondy terminus were lengthened and reorganized to assign a platform dedicated for arrivals and another dedicated for departures, allowing for 3 minute intervals between both departures and arrivals. The installation of switches to the branch required that Gargan station be moved entirely 90 m (295 ft) further southwards down the line. The conversion of traction to 750V takes place gradually about 2 km (1.2 mi) along the branch from Gargan because several hundred meters are required for the lowering of the pantograph and the conduction of the current.

== Infrastructure ==
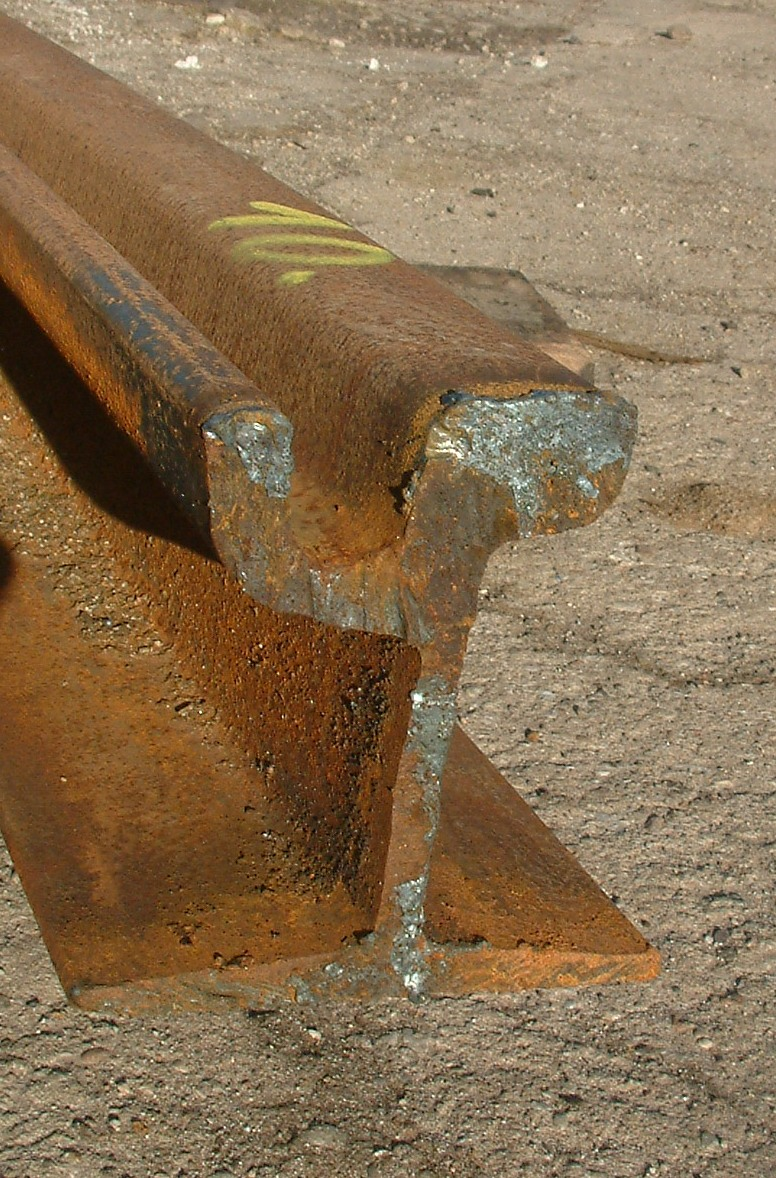
Cross section of a grooved tram rail which is typical of tramway lines

The T4 is a hybrid line. In most cases, French rail lines are electrified (when applicable) in 1,500 V or 25 kV, and use Vignole rails and a block signal system. These trains travel on the left.

The T4 Line is electrified in 25 kV and uses classic tracks like the national railway system instead of urban tram flange rails, which are flat tracks built into recesses in a road or greenspace. Instead, it has low platforms and its trains travel on the right. Like tramways, the line uses multi-aspect signalling, and crossings are equipped with traffic lights. Thus tram-trains exceed the capabilities of vehicles that can only travel on the national railway system or on urban tramway lines.

However, a true tram-train was not in use in 2011, but should be in the future with planned tramway extensions into urban areas (tramway tracks electrified in continuous 750 or 1,500 volts).

The line is also the first in France to use the GSM-R communications system, a standard ground-train radio link that is progressively being implemented throughout the French rail network.

== Layout and Stations ==
=== Route layout ===
The line departs from Bondy Station, which has two station tracks located beside the passenger building on the Paris-Est à Strasbourg-Ville Line (Line 1). It leaves from the north of the station and heads east to Remise à Jorelle Station before curving to the north. The flyover that was once used by trains heading toward Bondy and Paris-Est is now used to access the Noisy shop. The line then runs in between two one-way roads located beside the tracks. It stops at Les Coquetiers Station in Villemomble where the line is enclosed by Aulnay Boulevard, then Allée de la Tour-Rendez-Vous at the limits of Villemomble, Le Raincy, and Les Pavillons-sous-Bois.

The line then runs along Pasteur Boulevard, where it makes a stop at Les Pavillons-sous-Bois before making its way north. After it reaches Gargan Station, which is located between Louis-Pasteur and Roy Boulevards, it travels up the former RN3 overpass, now known as Aristide-Briand Avenue, before returning to ground level again. The train then runs between Édouard-Vaillant and Maurice-Berteaux Boulevards. A bit further, the line stops at the Lycée Henri Sellier Station, then the old L'Abbaye Station before following an S-shaped route westward. It then stops at Freinville-Sevran Station, runs along the former RN370, which is now called Westinghouse Boulevard, before crossing the de l'Ourcq Canal. From this point on, the train heads directly westward. It makes a stop at Rougemont-Chanteloup Station then reaches the La Plaine à Hirson line near the bifurcation at Roissy and runs along it for a few hundred metres. The train completes its journey at Aulnay-sous-Bois Station on two dead-end tracks 7,900 metres (25,900 ft) from the line's starting point.

The T4 branch departs from Gargan Station in the Pavillons-sous-Bois commune, which will also be the terminus of the forthcoming T Zen 3. It partially crosses the Town of Livry-Gargan (de la République and Marx-Dormoy Boulevards and Léon-Blum Avenue), then Clichy-sous-Bois (Romain-Rolland and Maurice-Audin Alleys), and Montfermeil (Utrillo Street, Jean-Jaurès Avenue, 8-Mai-1945 Street, Général-Leclerc Street, and Henri-Barbusse Street) where it terminates near the intercommunal hospital centre. A planned one-way loop along Henri-Barbusse Street has been delayed.

=== Shops ===
The line's fifteen tram-trains are maintained at shops in the de Paris-Est technicentre located in Noisy-le-Sec in Seine-Saint-Denis. They were renovated after the creation of the RER E.

This technicentre maintains the Transilien network's rolling stock for Paris-Est: the twenty-eight Z 20500 cars, the Transilien Line P's thirty rames inox de banlieue (stainless steel suburban cars) or RIB, and the fifty-three cars from the RER Line E.

The maintenance area includes a 210 by 90 metres (690 ft × 300 ft) space with ten specialized tracks: one for simultaneous lifting, one for removing parts, two for cleaning, two tram-train repair pits, and four rolling stock repair pits. The shop also contains moveable lift baskets and bridge cranes. It also contains an outdoor beam for short-term servicing and cleaning operations. It has nineteen 245-metre (804 ft)-long tracks: five tracks contain repair pits with access to train roofs and fourteen tracks at ground level, four of which contain platforms.

== Operations ==
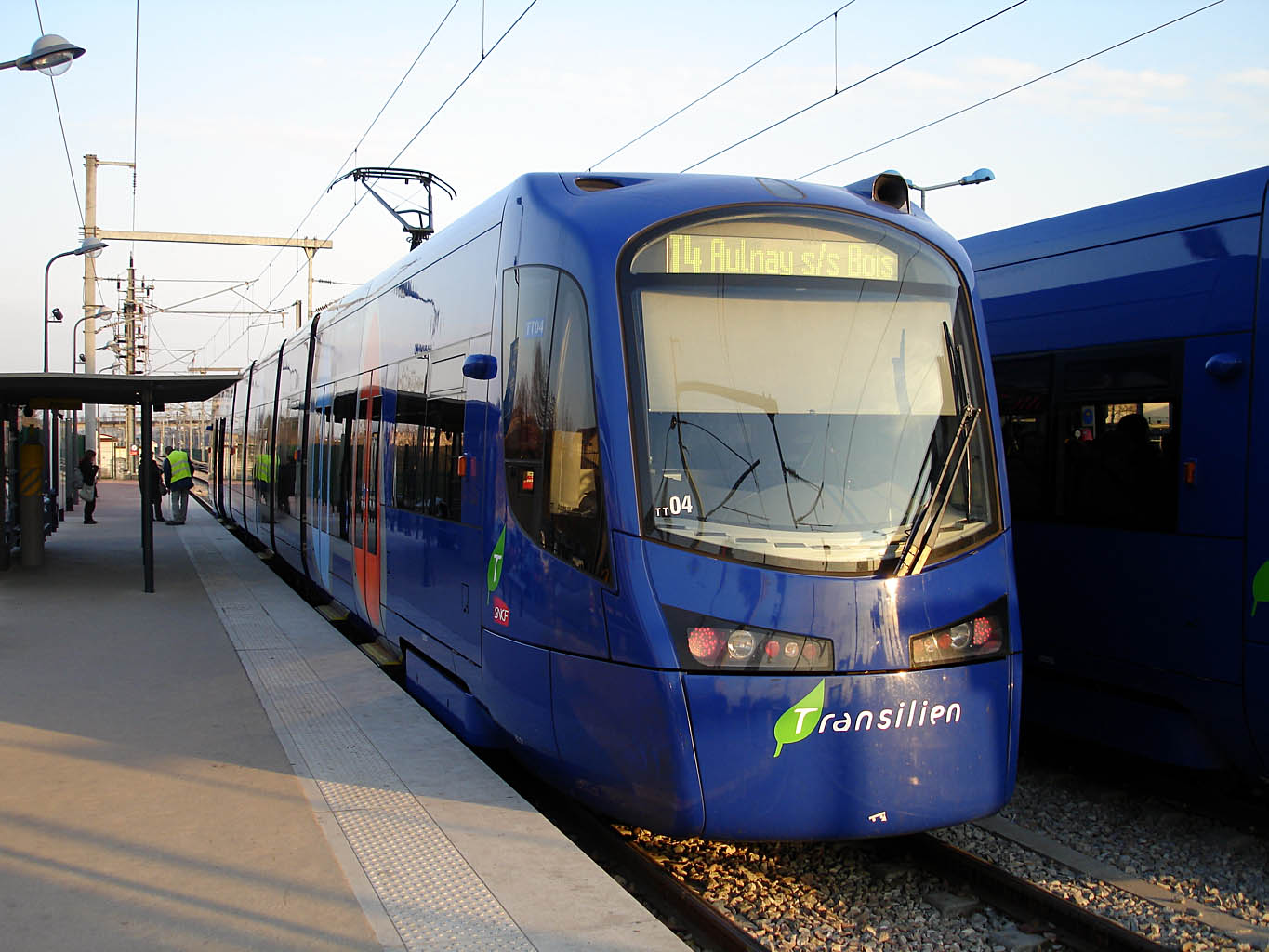
A U 25500 TT04 train set at Bondy Station.

The T4 tram-train line is operated by the SNCF. It runs from approximately 4:30 A.M. to 1:20 A.M. year-round with fifteen U 25500 cars and travels from Bondy to Aulnay in approximately twenty minutes.

Service can occasionally be maintained continuously for twenty-four hours during important events such as the Fête de la musique or New Year's Eve. During these periods' special night service, called "Nuit Festive," (festive night) tram-trains run every half-hour.

=== Schedule ===
Monday through Saturday, the line operates as follows:

- between 4:30 A.M. and 6:00 A.M.: one tram-train every nine minutes;
- between 6:00 A.M. and 8:00 P.M.: one tram-train every six minutes;
- between 8:00 P.M. and 10:00 P.M.: one tram-train every nine minutes;
- between 10:00 P.M. and 1:20 A.M.: one tram-train every fifteen minutes.

On Sundays and statutory holidays, the line operates:

- between 4:30 A.M. and 10:00 P.M.: one tram-train every nine minutes;
- between 10:00 P.M. and 1:20 A.M.: one tram-train every fifteen minutes.

=== Rolling Stock ===
==== Avanto S70 (U 25500) ====
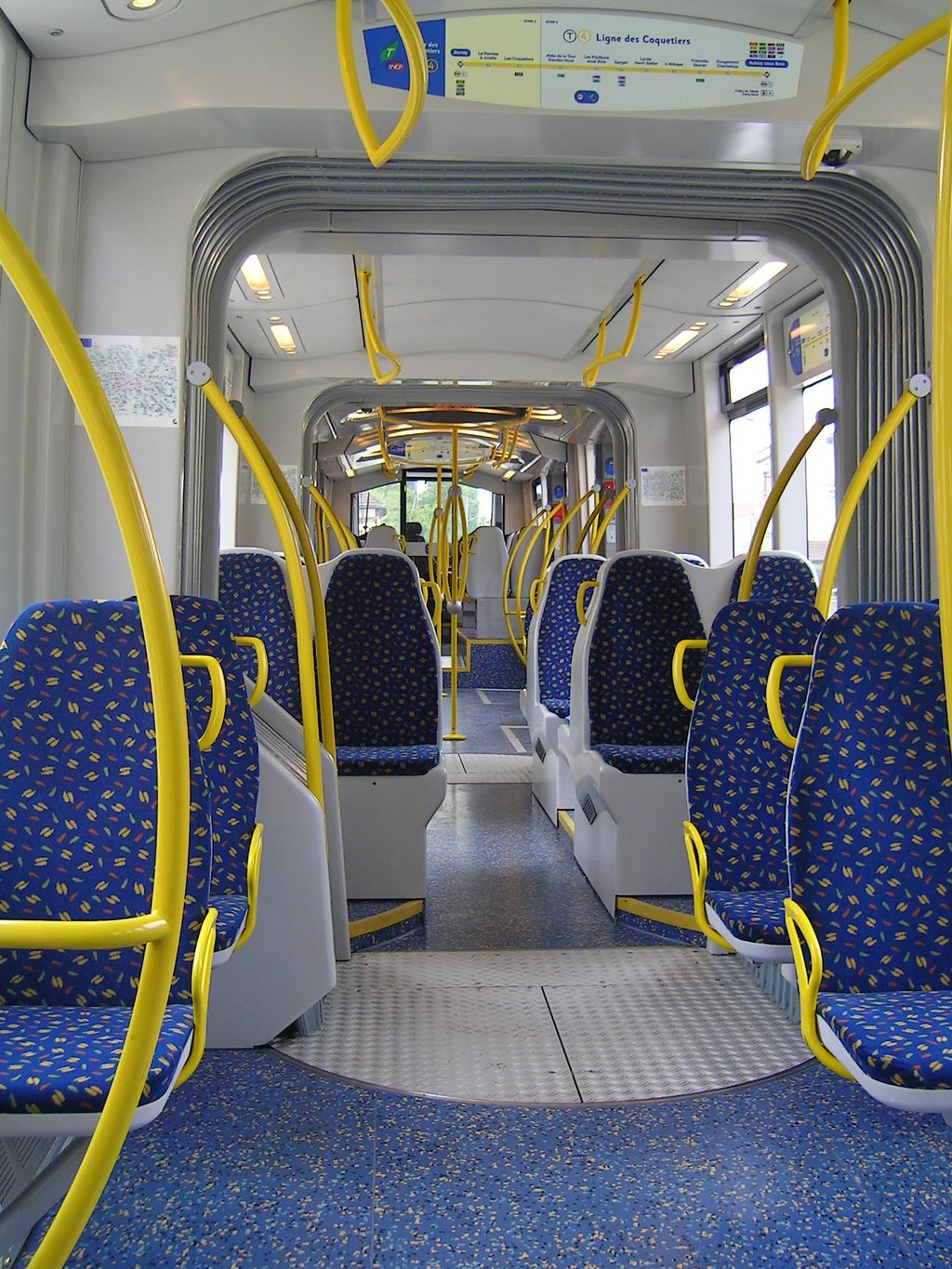
The inside of a car.

In 2011, the T4 Line used fifteen U 25500s trains built by Siemens called the Avanto: nine units for day-to-day operations, four in reserve, and two for maintenance.

Since 4 July 2011, the line's reserve cars have also served the SNCF Esbly-Crécy rail shuttle. However, in 2011, only a single car was needed for the shuttle. Multiple-unit traffic on the shuttle is possible, which uses two of the fifteen cars.

The Avanto rolling stock was chosen after a 2001 call for tenders by the SNCF to equip the line. German builder Siemens won the bid, Germany being where the tram-train concept originated. It was the first tramway-style train to be able to travel on French railways.

Each 37-metre (121 ft)-long unit is composed of five articulated sections and has a capacity of 242 passengers (80 seated). They are painted Transilien night blue with coloured swashes on the doors. The first car was delivered by road in November 2005 and 12 cars were ready to be put in service in November 2006. The stock has a maximum speed of 100 km/h (62 mph), but is not operated that fast on the line.

Unit TT07 was named Jérémy, in honour of a young technician in the production-maintenance unit at Noisy-le-Sec who died during an accident in October 2006.

==== Citadis Dualis (U 53700) ====
The Alstom Citadis Dualis (the Tram-train model of the generic Citadis) was selected to run the Montfermeil extension in January 2016. Fifteen cars were delivered and after a long period of testing, entered service with the line's inauguration on 14 December 2019.

Although the Citadis units only have four articulated sections, they come to a total length of 42 m (138 ft), have a width of 2.65 m (8 ft 8 in), have an axle load of 11.5t and have a total capacity of 250 passengers (90 seated). It is possible to form double or triple units to increase capacity. Citadis units are equipped with air-conditioning and on-board display systems. Units sport the livery of Île-de-France Mobilités, the organisation ultimately responsible for the Montfermeil extension, of white & silver with celeste trim. The first car was delivered to the Noisy depot on 2 November 2017.

=== Driving and Signalization ===
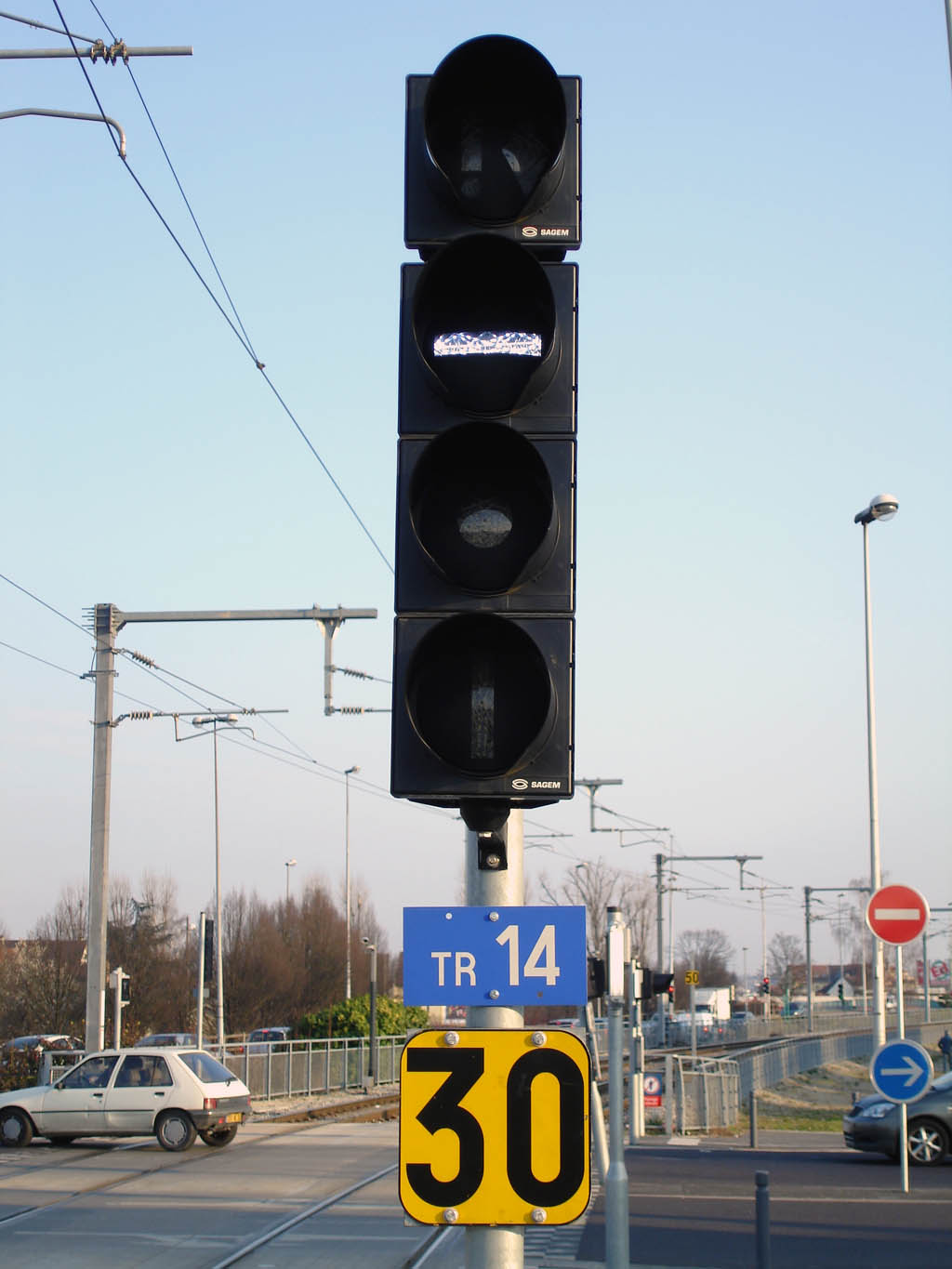
A R17 signal light protecting an automobile crossing: the tram must stop here. The speed limit is 30 km/h (19 mph).

The speed limit on the line is 70 km/h (43 mph). It is 50 km/h (31 mph) in urban areas (the majority of line) and 30 km/h (19 mph) when approaching crossings.

When the line opened, the SNCF created a new position: Tram-train conductor (conducteur Tram-Train (CRTT)). These conductors therefore only work on this line. Usually, conductors from one depot operate different types of trains based on need and regularly change lines.

Speed regulation is controlled by the conductors: the line contains only speed limit signs, route protection signals, and road crossing protection signals. For the former, the road network is equipped with classic R11-type tricolour lights and the rail line has R17 lights.

On a black background, a horizontal white line and a white circle means stop, and a vertical white line means go. An operating assistance signal completes the signalization: an illuminated lozenge indicating that a request for priority at a road crossing has been put in place.

The route protection signals are located at switches and crossings. Speed limit signs are square panels with black numbers on a yellow background.

=== Operating Staff ===
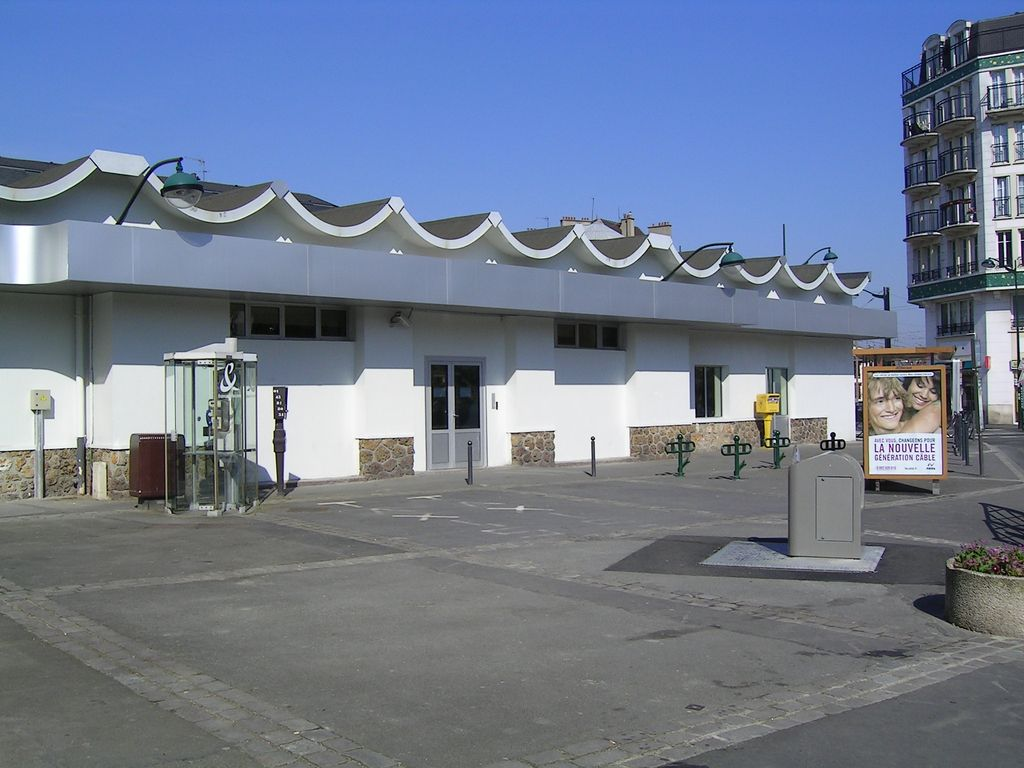
The T4 Line operations centre in Gargan.

In 2005, the SNCF signed an agreement with the Seine-Saint-Denis General Council through its Paris-Nord and Paris-Est establishments. The agreement, called Passerelle-Emploi or "employment gateway," makes hiring new employees from within the department a priority. One-third of employees that were hired came from within the department. Out of forty-one employees, twenty-seven became conductors and fourteen became sales representatives.

In 2007, the line had fifty-nine conductors (seven of which were women), a head of motive power production, and two managers. It also had twenty-eight sales representatives and a train team coordinator and their assistant. Half of these employees were hired externally. The T4 also has twelve urban train dispatchers overseen by three department heads and seventeen managers, and a dozen employees to maintain the cars at the Noisy-le-Sec shop.

Safety is ensured by the railway police teams (SUGE) and onboard cameras, which allow conductors to see the inside of the car.

There was some social conflict during the summer of 2012, leading to the use of replacement buses after the conductors' work organization was changed.

=== Traffic ===
In February 2007, traffic on the T4 line had risen to 21,000 passengers a day. By October 2007, it had reached 29,000. The long term forecast for the line is 40,000 daily passengers.

== Planned extensions ==
=== Completion of the Montfermeil loop ===
The extension of T4 to Hôpital de Montfermeil was supposed to end in a one-way loop with four tram stops (Arboretum, Hôpital de Montfermeil, Paul Bert, Daniel Perdrigé). However, Le Parisien reported in June 2017 that part of the loop along Rue Henri Barbusse with two tram stops (Paul Bert, Daniel Perdrigé) was deferred to a "second phase", due to a conflict with a housing project on the same street, which received a time-limited subsidy.

The last known update on the missing section was in September 2020 (6 years ago), when it was reported to be in the planning stage: at the time, online publication Actu.fr claimed that the target start date for works was in 2022. As of July 2025, the missing section is not listed as an active project on the website of Île-de-France Mobilités.

== Appendixes ==
=== Related Articles ===
- Transilien Paris-Est
- Paris-Strasbourg Railway (called Line 1)
- Tramways in Île-de-France
- Transilien
- Syndicat des transports d'Île-de-France (STIF)

=== External links ===
- La fin de la ligne des Coquetiers [French]
- T4 Clichy-Montfermeil official website [French]
- gallery of line T4

=== Bibliography ===
- Jean Tricoire, Le Tramway à Paris et en Île-de-France, La Vie du Rail, 2007, 143 p.
- Plaquette sous la direction de Jean-Barthélémi Debost (service du patrimoine culturel – Conseil général de la Seine-Saint-Denis),La ligne des Coquetiers (1875–2006) : de Bondy à Aulnay, un chemin de fer au service du développement local, Éditions du Conseil général, Bobigny 2007, 12 p.
- Gérard Géraud, Michel Mérille, La Ligne de M. Gargan. L’histoire ferroviaire de l’Est parisien, Les Pavillons-sous-Bois, Amarco éd., 2004, 351 p, ISBN 2-9509571-8-8
