= Allée de la Tour–Rendez-Vous station =

Railway station in Villemomble, France

Coordinates: 48.8973°N 2.5065°E

Allée de la Tour–Rendez-Vous
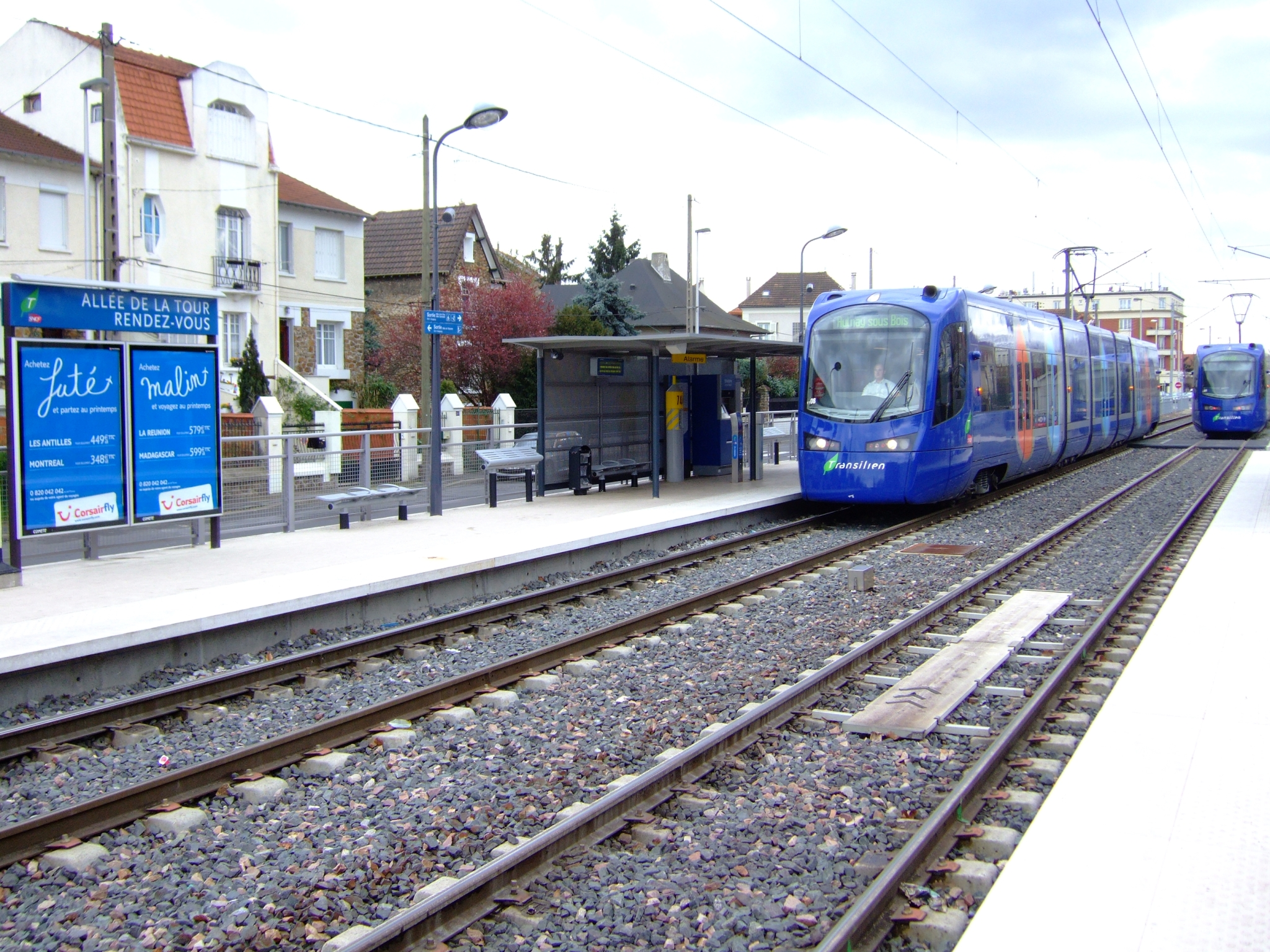

General information
- Location: boulevard d'Aulnay, Villemomble, Seine-Saint-Denis; France
- Owner: SNCF
- Line: Île-de-France tramway Line 4
- Platforms: 2 side
- Tracks: 2

Construction
- Structure type: Ground

Other information
- Station code: 8711387
- Fare zone: Zone 4

History
- Opened: 1875

Passengers
- 2024: 1,006,727

Services
Preceding station	Tram	Following station
Les Coquetiers towards Bondy	T4	Les Pavillons-sous-Bois towards Aulnay-sous-Bois or Hôpital de Montfermeil
Location

Allée de la Tour–Rendez-Vous is a railway station on the Île-de-France tramway Line 4 in the commune of Villemomble.
