= Les Pavillons-sous-Bois station =

Railway station in Les Pavillons-sous-Bois, France

Coordinates: 48.9028°N 2.5120°E

Les Pavillons-sous-Bois
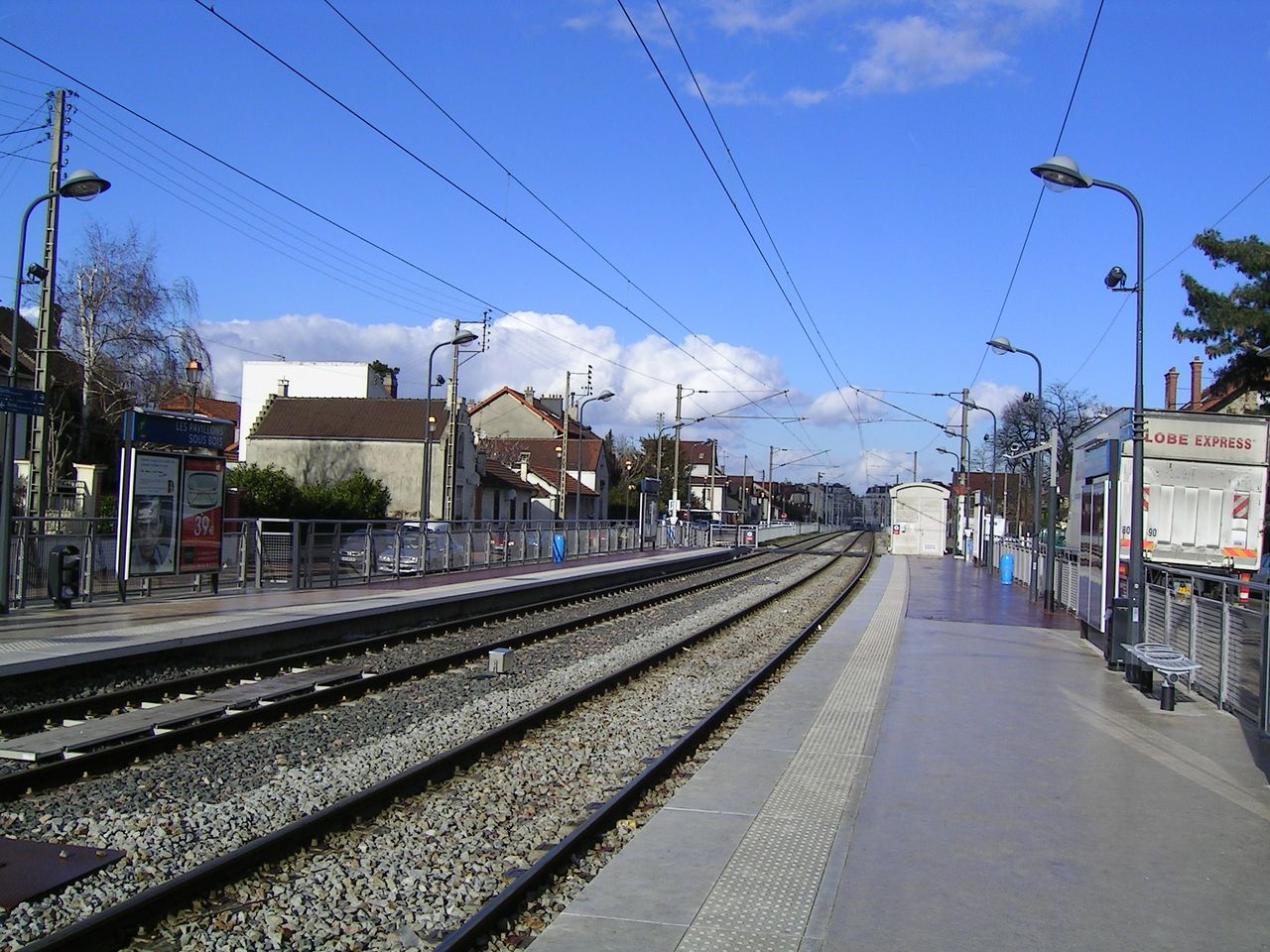

General information
- Location: boulevard Pasteur, Les Pavillons-sous-Bois, Seine-Saint-Denis; France
- Owner: SNCF
- Line: Île-de-France tramway Line 4
- Platforms: 2 side
- Tracks: 2

Construction
- Structure type: Ground

Other information
- Station code: 8711385
- Fare zone: Zone 4

History
- Opened: 1875

Passengers
- 2024: 2,345,637

Services
Preceding station	Tram	Following station
Allée de la Tour–Rendez-Vous towards Bondy	T4	Gargan towards Aulnay-sous-Bois or Hôpital de Montfermeil
Location

Les Pavillons-sous-Bois is a railway station located on the Île-de-France tramway Line 4 in the eponymous commune of Les Pavillons-sous-Bois.

The station was formerly named Raincy-Pavillons when put into service in 1875.
