= Remise à Jorelle railway station =

Railway station in Bondy, France

Remise à Jorelle
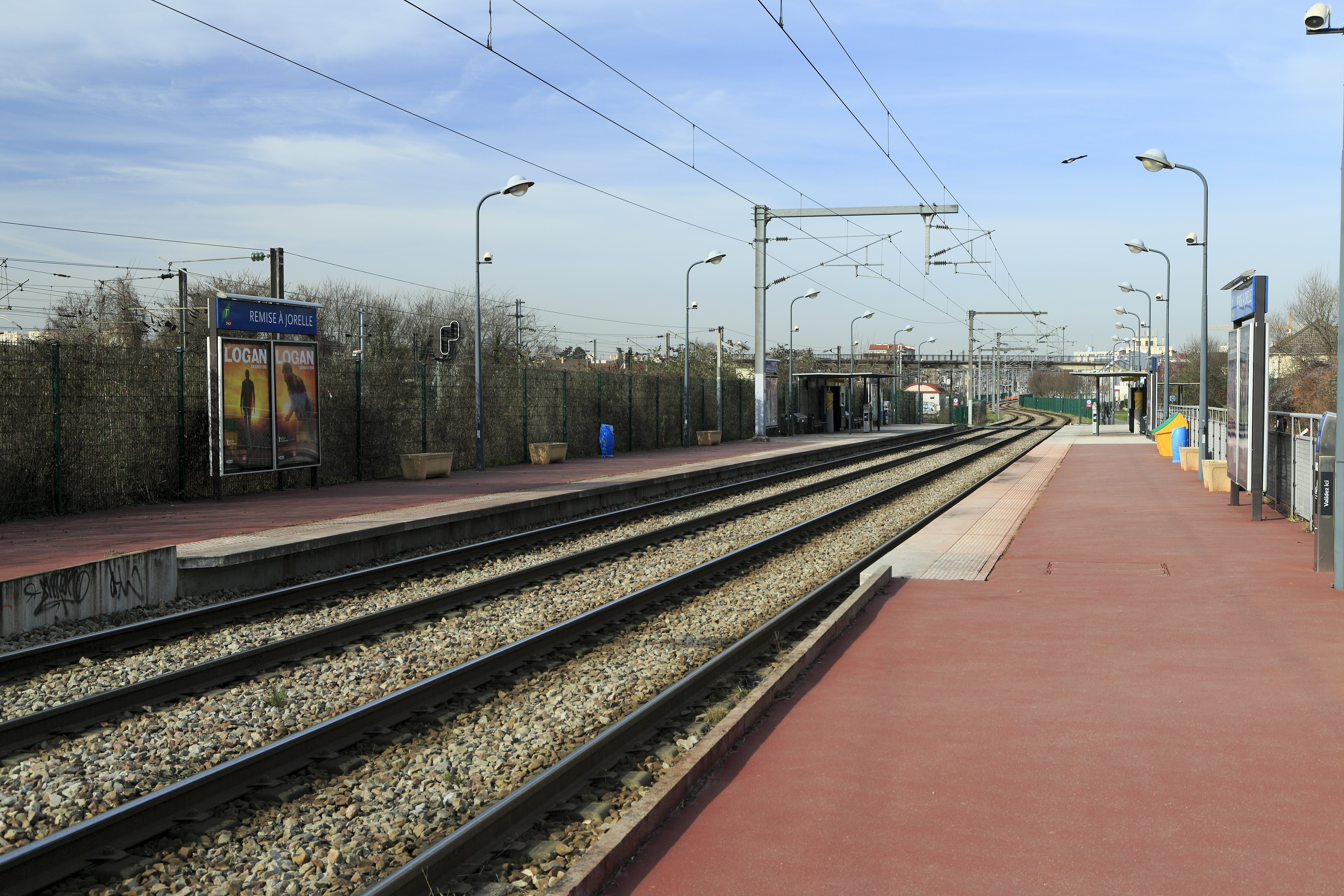

General information
- Location: rue Rudyard Kipling, Bondy, Seine-Saint-Denis; France
- Coordinates: 48.8930°N 2.4883°E
- Owner: SNCF
- Line: Île-de-France tramway Line 4
- Platforms: 2 side
- Tracks: 2

Construction
- Structure type: Ground

Other information
- Station code: 8798870
- Fare zone: Zone 4

History
- Opened: 18 November 2006

Passengers
- 2014: 750 600 passengers
Location

Remise à Jorelle is a railway station located on the Île-de-France tramway Line 4 in the commune of Bondy. La Remise À Jorelle is also the name of the neighbourhood where the station is located.

Preceding station	Tram	Following station
Bondy Terminus	T4	Les Coquetiers towards Aulnay-sous-Bois or Hôpital de Montfermeil
