= Rougemont–Chanteloup station =

Railway station in France

Coordinates: 48.9308°N 2.5154°E

Rougemont–Chanteloup
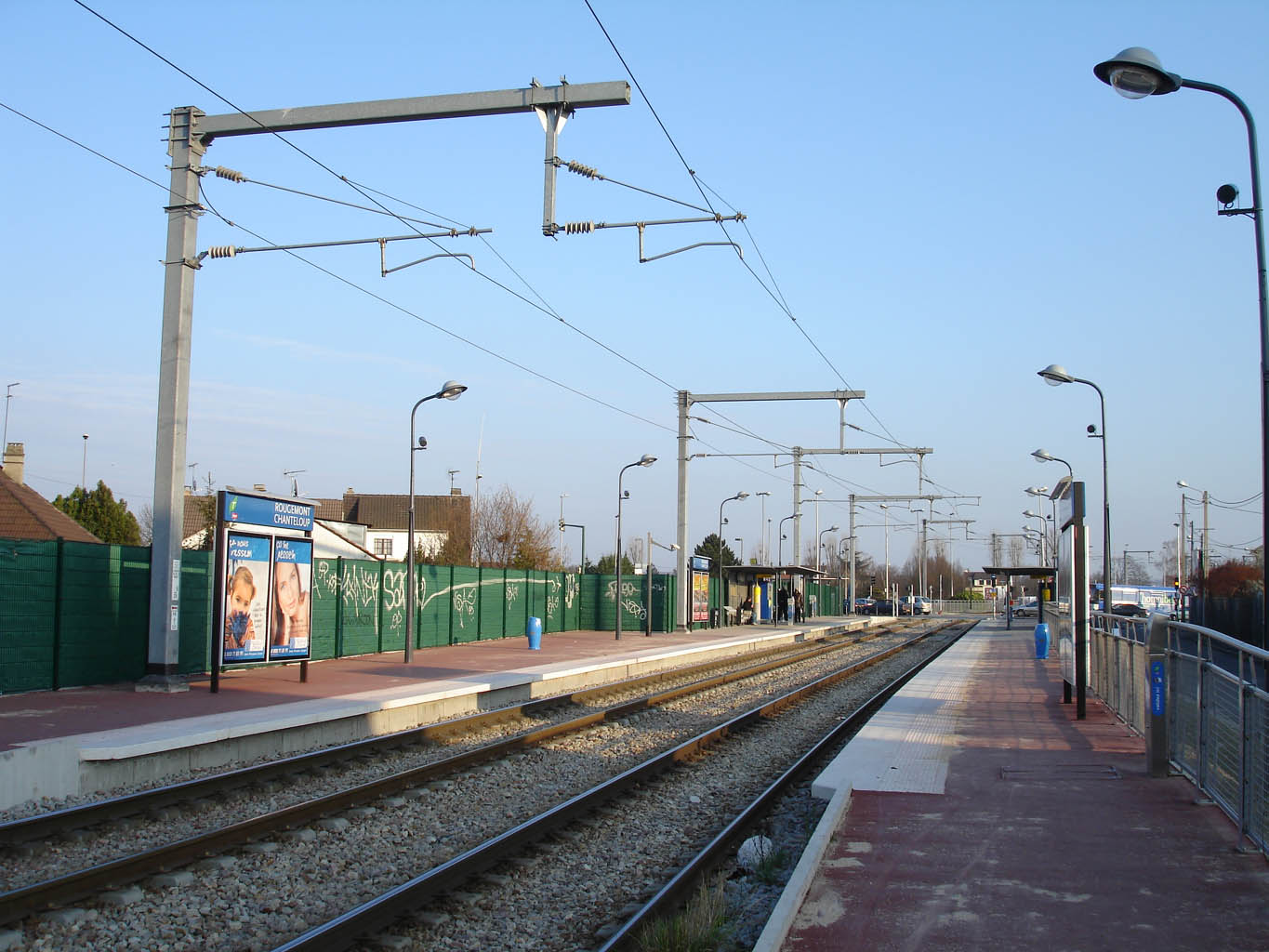

General information
- Location: allée du Maréchal-Gérard, Sevran, Seine-Saint-Denis; France
- Owner: SNCF
- Line: Île-de-France tramway Line 4
- Platforms: 2 side
- Tracks: 2

Construction
- Structure type: Ground

Other information
- Station code: 8743179
- Fare zone: Zone 4

History
- Opened: 18 November 2006

Passengers
- 2024: 1,927,798

Services
| Preceding station | Tram | Following station |
|---|---|---|
| Freinville – Sevran towards Bondy | T4 Aulnay-sous-Bois branch | Aulnay-sous-Bois Terminus |
Location

Rougemont–Chanteloup is a railway station located on the Île-de-France tramway Line 4 in the commune of Sevran. The station is situated between the neighborhood of Rougemont in Sevran and the industrial park of Chanteloup in Aulnay-sous-Bois.
