= Hôtel de Ville, Livry-Gargan =

Town hall in Livry-Gargan, France

Hôtel de Ville
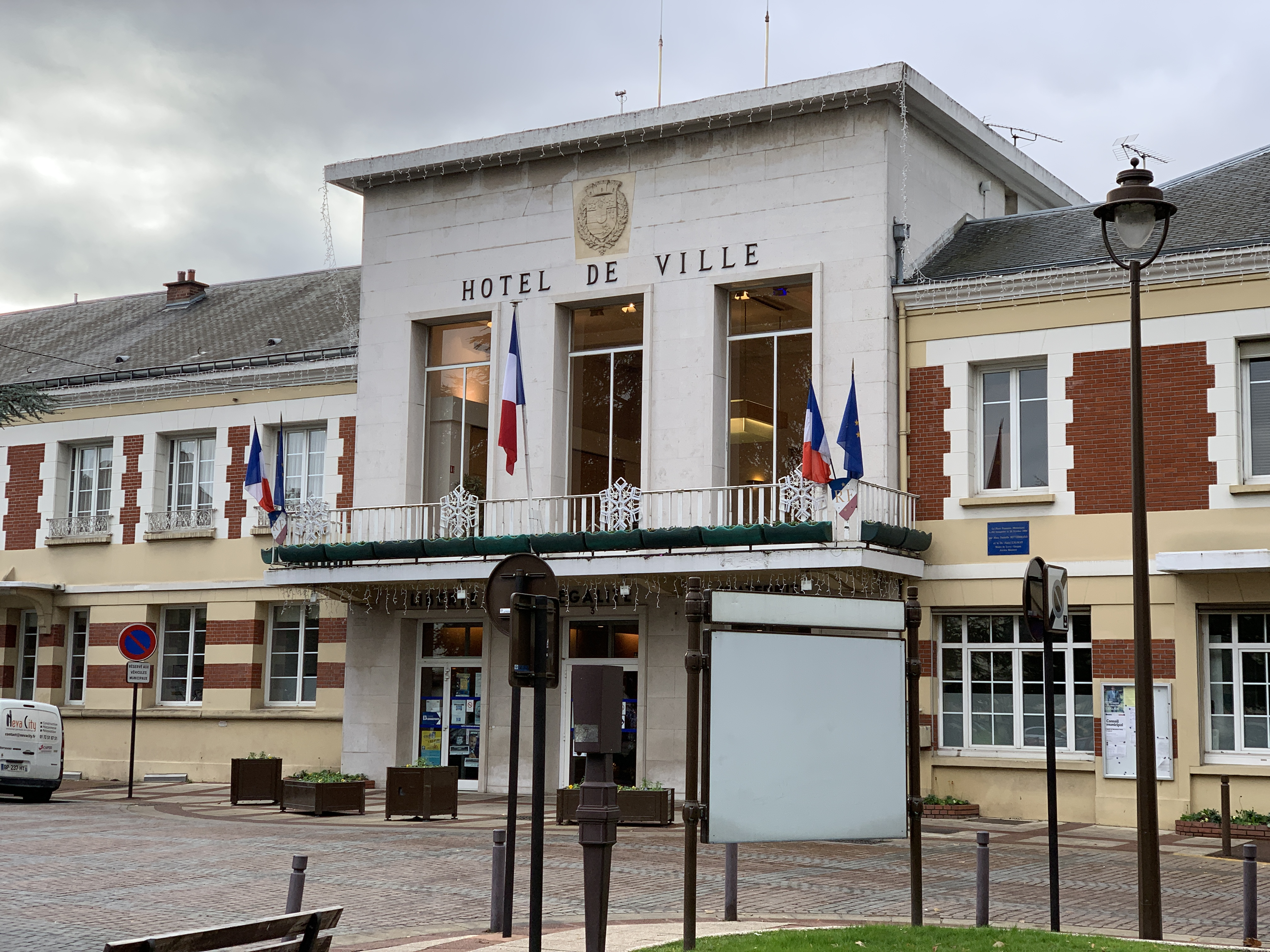
- The main frontage of the Hôtel de Ville in December 2019
- Interactive map of the Hôtel de Ville area

General information
- Type: City hall
- Architectural style: Neoclassical style
- Location: Livry-Gargan, France
- Coordinates: 48.9191°N 2.5365°E
- Completed: c.1900

The Hôtel de Ville (French pronunciation: [otɛl də vil], City Hall) is a municipal building in Livry-Gargan, Seine-Saint-Denis, in the northeastern suburbs of Paris, standing on Place François Mitterrand.

== History ==
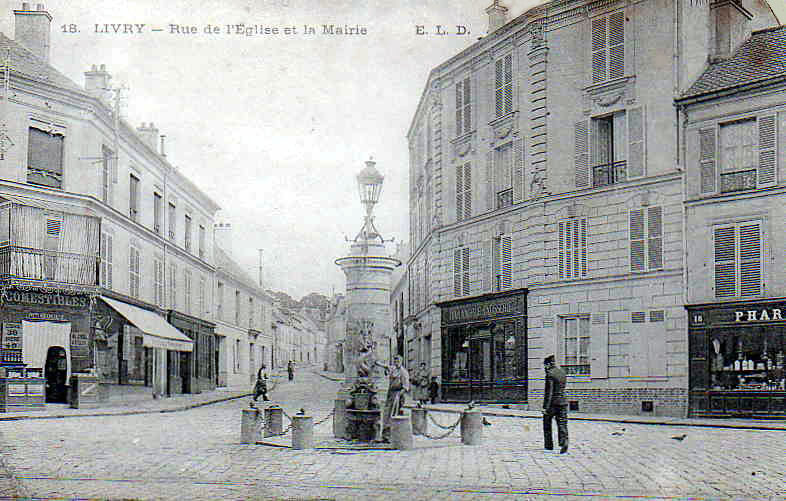
The old town hall on Rue de l'Église (on the right)

Following the French Revolution, meetings of the town council were initially held in one of the buildings attached to the clergy house on Rue de l'Église, near the Church of Notre-Dame de Livry. In 1831, the council moved to an adjacent building still forming part of the clergy house. The possessions of the council at that time included a bust of Louis Philippe I.

In the late-19th century, following significant population growth, the council decided to commission a more substantial town hall. The site they selected formed part of a large estate formerly known as the Écu de France (the shield of France). The land was acquired by Guy Nicolas de Durfort, 1st Duke of Lorges in 1714. He established a network of ponds and used them to supply water to a large fountain, and also planted some fine trees. The property was bought by Innocent Catherine de Rougé du Plessis-Bellière, Marquise du Plessis-Bellière in 1747. It then passed to a local squire, Henri-Jacques-Anselme-Joseph-Auguste Poret de Boisandré, in 1775, and to a soldier, Marshal Louis Georges Érasme de Contades, in 1787. Contrades died in Livry in 1795.

The property was conserved as parkland throughout the 19th century until it was acquired by the council in 1898. Construction work then got underway. The building was designed in the neoclassical style, built in a mixture of brick and stone and was completed in the early 20th century. The design involved an entrance block of three bays, which was slightly projected forward and faced in stone, and two wings of eight bays each. The entrance block featured three square headed glass doors on the ground floor and three French doors with a wide balcony on the first floor. There was a municipal coat of arms on the parapet above. The wings were fenestrated with casement windows on both floors and there were iron railings in front of the first-floor windows. Internally, the principal rooms are the offices of the council staff. The building was also the meeting place off the council until Espace Jules Verne, a separate building to the north of the town hall, became available in 2006.

During the Second World War, a former member of the council, Lucien Michard, was arrested for illegal possession of weapons: he was shot by German soldiers at Fort Mont-Valérien on 13 January 1942. The town was liberated by American troops on 27 August 1944. The square in front of the town hall was landscaped and named Place François Mitterrand in honour of the former president of France. It was officially opened by his wife, Danielle Mitterrand, in the presence of the mayor, Alain Calmat, on 18 October 1996.
