= Route nationale 3 =

Road in France

The Route nationale 3 is a trunk road (nationale) in France connecting Paris to the frontier of Germany.

== Reclassification ==
For the majority of its route, the RN 3 runs parallel to the A4 autoroute. As a result, sections have been or are proposed to be de-classified. The road is now numbered the RD 3 through the Department of Marne.

== Route ==
=== Paris to Châlons-en-Champagne (0 km to 162 km) ===
The road begins in Paris at the Porte de Pantin becoming the Avenue Jean Lolive. It heads through the Eastern Paris suburbs including Bobigny where it crosses the A3 autoroute and then the A104 autoroute after which it passes through Clare-Souilly and into the Marne valley. After 15 km the RN 3 enters Meaux after which it crosses the Marne and heads through the Forêt de Montceaux. The A4 autoroute crosses the road which turns north 7 km further at la Ferté sous Jouarre and crosses to the Marne again. The road crosses the Marne again at Château-Thierry and heads east through the Bois de Condé. The road comes to Épernay, to the North is the Parc Naturel Régional de la Montagne de Reims, the heart of the Champagne region. The road is then called the RD 3 to Châlons-en-Champagne where it leaves the Marne valley. The A26 autoroute passes north–south between Reims and Troyes.

=== Châlons-en-Champagne to Metz (162 km to 298 km) ===
The road crosses the plain and the RD994 an ancient Roman road and then the TGV Est (high-speed line). The road passes through Sainte-Menehould before passing over the Forêt D'Argonne which rises to over 250 m. The road heads through undulating countryside before joining the Voie Sacrée and the Verdun passing several war memorials and Fort de Regret. The road heads northeast out of Verdun and through the Forêt de Verdun and the ruins of the Fort de Tavannes.

At Etain, the road passes southeast and then through Jarny and then over a ridge of hills and the Bois de Vaux into Metz and the River Moselle.

=== Metz to German Frontier (298 km to 374 km) ===
After Metz, the road crosses the A31 autoroute parallel to the A4 autoroute. The road continues over the hills now over 300 m high before a steep incline down into Saint-Avold now only 4 km south of the frontier with Germany. The RN3 passes through the Foret de Steinberg and then northeast passing through Forbach and Stirling Wendel before reaching the German border. Thereafter it becomes the B 41 to Saarbrücken 8 km to the northwest.
