= Livry-Gargan =

- Commune
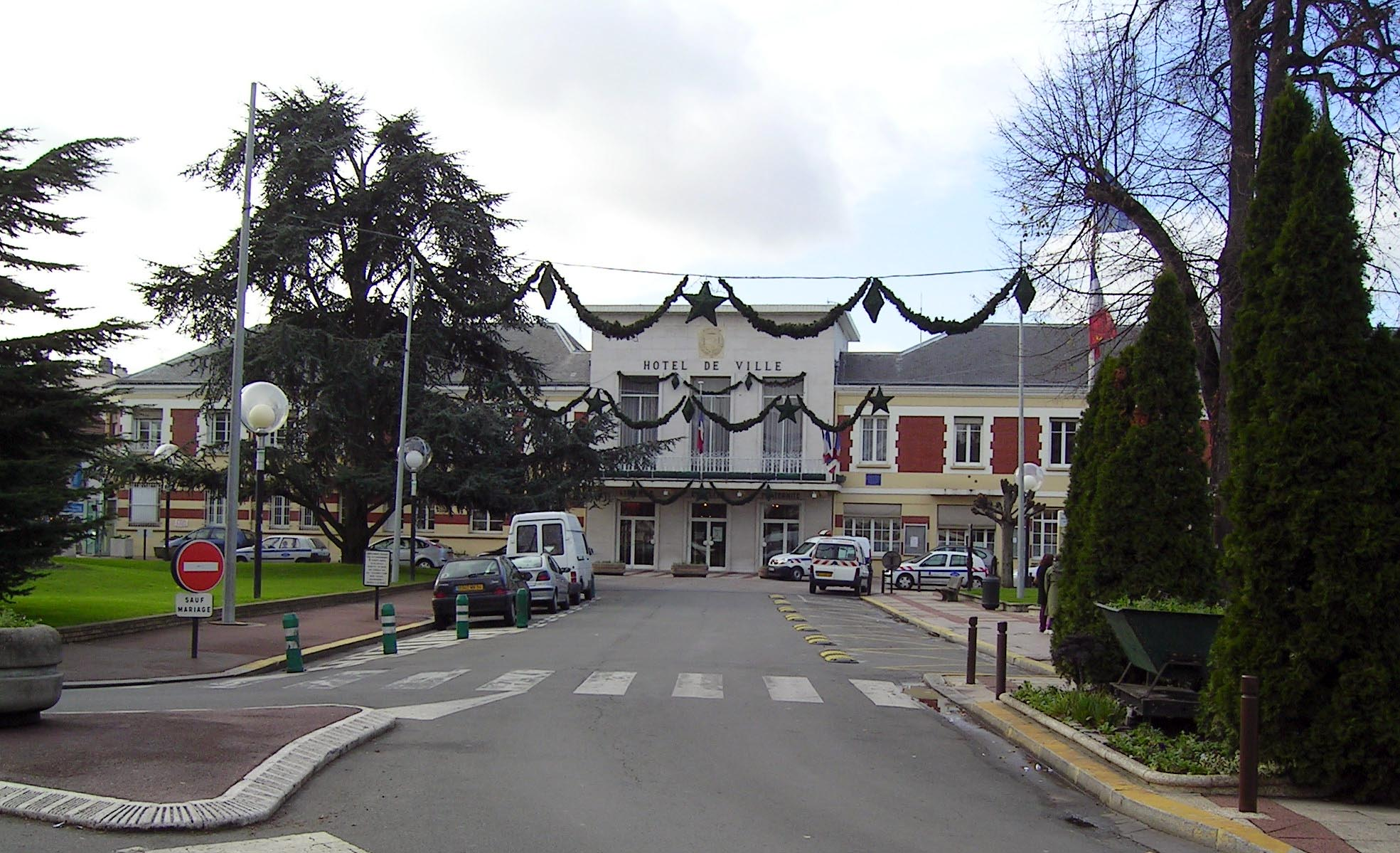
- The Hôtel de Ville

- Coat of arms

- Location (in red) within Paris inner suburbs
- Location of Livry-Gargan
- Location within France Location within Île-de-France (region)
- Coordinates: 48°55′09″N 2°32′10″E
- Country: France
- Region: Île-de-France
- Department: Seine-Saint-Denis
- Arrondissement: Le Raincy
- Canton: Livry-Gargan
- Intercommunality: Grand Paris

Government
  - Mayor (2026–32): Pierre-Yves Martin
- Area^{1}: 7.38 km^{2} (2.85 sq mi)
- Highest elevation: 125 m (410 ft)
- Lowest elevation: 54 m (177 ft)
- Population (2023): 47,228
  - Density: 6,400/km^{2} (16,600/sq mi)
- Time zone: UTC+01:00 (CET)
  - Summer (DST): UTC+02:00 (CEST)
- INSEE/Postal code: 93046 /93190
- ^{1} French Land Register data, which excludes lakes, ponds, glaciers > 1 km^{2} (0.386 sq mi or 247 acres) and river estuaries.

Livry-Gargan (French pronunciation: [livʁi ɡaʁgɑ̃]) is a commune in the northeastern suburbs of Paris, France. It is located 15.6 km (9.7 mi) from the center of Paris.

== History ==
The name Livry derives from the Latin Liberiacum meaning the 'estate of Liberius', a Gallo-Roman personal name. Gargan was added to the commune's name in 1912. The name comes from Xavier Gargan, who built a factory in the area in the 19th century.

During the Middle Ages, the lordship of Livry (seigneur de Livry) was held by members of the House of Garlande before passing to Pierre de Chambly, chamberlain of King Philip IV, in 1285.

On 20 May 1869, a part of the territory of Livry-Gargan was detached and merged with a part of the territory of Clichy-sous-Bois and a small part of the territory of Gagny to create the commune of Le Raincy.

The Hôtel de Ville was erected in a large park formerly known as the "Écu de France" in the early 20th century.

== Population ==
Historical population

| Year | Pop. | ±% p.a. |
|---|---|---|
| 1793 | 912 | — |
| 1800 | 796 | −1.92% |
| 1806 | 853 | +1.16% |
| 1821 | 720 | −1.12% |
| 1831 | 975 | +3.08% |
| 1836 | 1,022 | +0.95% |
| 1841 | 1,012 | −0.20% |
| 1846 | 1,078 | +1.27% |
| 1851 | 1,237 | +2.79% |
| 1856 | 1,369 | +2.05% |
| 1861 | 2,207 | +10.02% |
| 1866 | 2,918 | +5.74% |
| 1872 | 1,792 | −7.80% |
| 1876 | 2,195 | +5.20% |
| 1881 | 2,825 | +5.18% |
| 1886 | 3,062 | +1.62% |
| 1891 | 3,238 | +1.12% |
| 1896 | 4,056 | +4.61% |
| 1901 | 5,188 | +5.05% |

| Year | Pop. | ±% p.a. |
|---|---|---|
| 1906 | 6,673 | +5.16% |
| 1911 | 8,872 | +5.86% |
| 1921 | 11,573 | +2.69% |
| 1926 | 16,869 | +7.83% |
| 1931 | 21,366 | +4.84% |
| 1936 | 20,970 | −0.37% |
| 1946 | 20,698 | −0.13% |
| 1954 | 25,322 | +2.55% |
| 1962 | 29,679 | +2.00% |
| 1968 | 32,063 | +1.30% |
| 1975 | 32,917 | +0.38% |
| 1982 | 32,778 | −0.06% |
| 1990 | 35,387 | +0.96% |
| 1999 | 37,288 | +0.58% |
| 2007 | 41,893 | +1.47% |
| 2012 | 42,699 | +0.38% |
| 2017 | 44,437 | +0.80% |
| 2023 | 47,228 | +1.02% |

Source: EHESS and INSEE (1968-2023)

=== Heraldry ===
| Armes de la ville. | Over the centuries, the arms have changed depending on who owned the area. But the modern arms are : Parti per pale: Or two fesses Gules (for Garlande) and Azure a bend Argent between in chief three acorns and in base two eagle talons Or; on a chief Gules, a bunch of grapes slipped and leaved Or between 2 cinquefoils Argent; overall an inescutcheon quarterly Sable and Argent. |

== Transport ==
Livry-Gargan is not served by any station of the Paris Métro, RER, or suburban rail network. The closest station to Livry-Gargan is Sevran – Livry station on Paris RER line B. This station is located in the neighboring commune of Sevran, 1.9 km (1.2 mi) from the town center of Livry-Gargan. Tram 4 Gargan Station is very near to the village and in tram 4 direction Hopital de Montfermeil there are two more station "République Marx-Dormoy" and "Léon Blum". These two stations are inside the village Livry-Gargan.

== Education ==
Schools include:

- 9 preschools
- 9 elementary schools
- Junior high schools: LÉON-JOUHAUX, SEGPA du collège, ÉDOUARD-HERRIOT, LUCIE-AUBRAC
- Senior high schools: Lycée André Boulloche, Lycée Henri Sellier

== Twin towns ==
Livry-Gargan is twinned with the communities of:

- Almuñécar, Spain
- Cerveteri, Italy
- Fürstenfeldbruck, Germany
- Haringey, United Kingdom

== Personalities ==
- Grégory Arnolin, born in 1980, footballer
- Cassandre Beaugrand, born in 1997, Triathlete and Olympic Gold Medalist
- Karim Cheurfi, perpetrator of the 2017 shooting of Paris police officers
- Laetitia Avia, born in 1985, politician
- Aïssa Laïdouni, born in 1996, footballer
- Ryad Hachem, born in 1998, footballer

== See also ==
- Communes of the Seine-Saint-Denis department
