= Bondy station =

Railway station in Bondy, France

Bondy
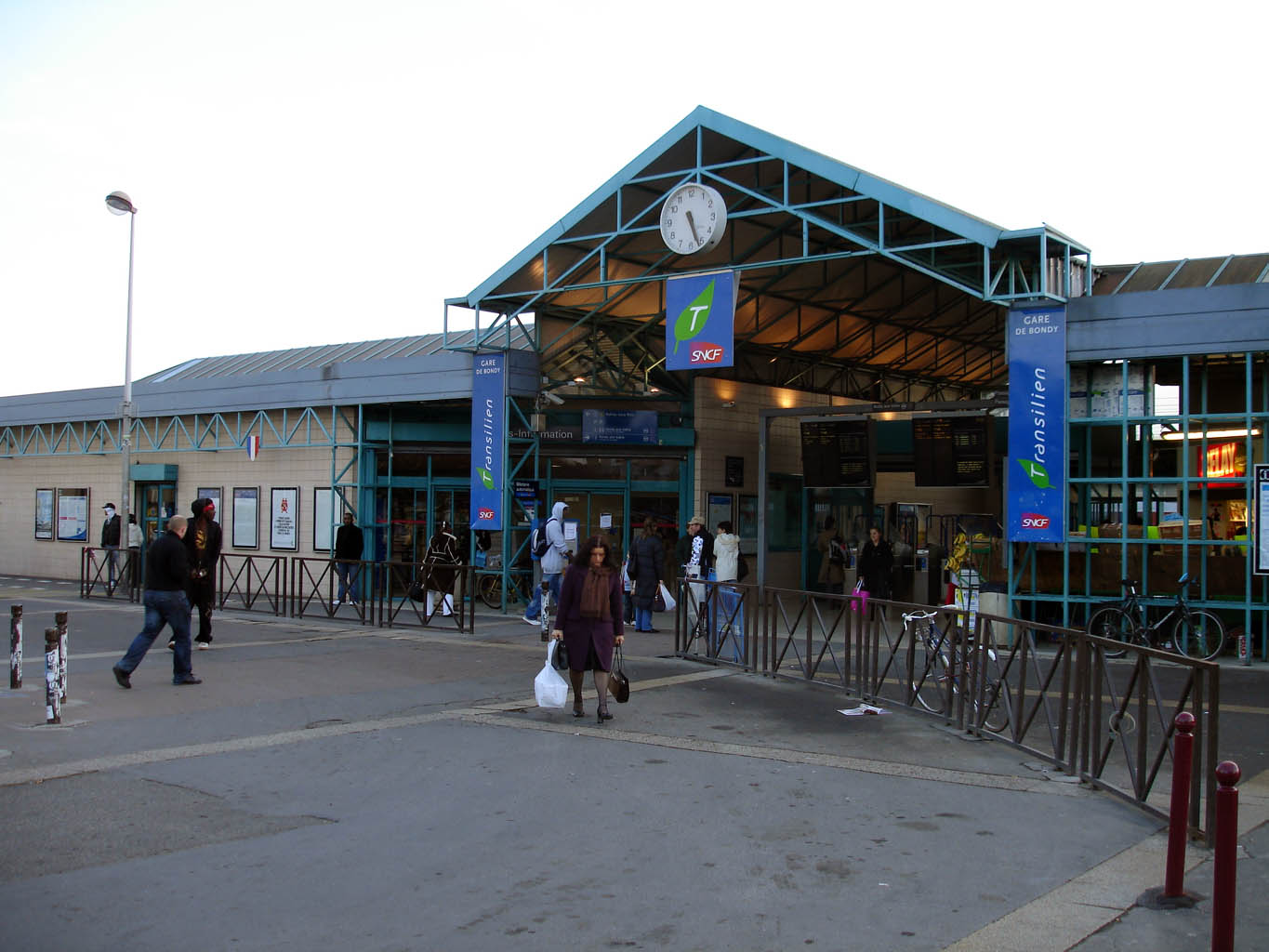
- Entrance to station building

General information
- Location: 1 Place de la République; Bondy; France
- Coordinates: 48°53′39″N 2°28′45″E
- Operator: SNCF
- Line: Paris-Est–Strasbourg-Ville railway
- Platforms: 4
- Tracks: 7
- Connections: RATP Bus: 303 346 TUB; Roissy Est: 2128; TRA: 616

Construction
- Parking: 300 spaces
- Accessible: Yes, by prior reservation

Other information
- Station code: 87113407
- Fare zone: 3

History
- Opened: 5 July 1849
- Rebuilt: 1999

Passengers
- 2024: 17,136,438

Services
| Preceding station | RER | Following station |
|---|---|---|
| Noisy-le-Sec towards Nanterre–La Folie | RER E | Le Raincy–Villemomble–Montfermeil towards Chelles–Gournay |
| Preceding station | Tram | Following station |
| Terminus | T4 | Remise à Jorelle towards Aulnay-sous-Bois or Hôpital de Montfermeil |
Location

Bondy station is a railway station in Bondy, Seine-Saint-Denis, France. The station opened in 1849 and is on the Paris-Est–Strasbourg-Ville railway. The station is served by RER line E services operated by SNCF. Bondy is also the terminus of tramway Line 4. In the future it will see services run by Paris Metro Line 15 as well.

== Train services ==
The station is served by the following service(s):

- Local services (RER E) Haussmann–Saint-Lazare–Chelles-Gournay
- Tram-train services (T4) Bondy–Aulnay-sous-Bois

== Gallery ==
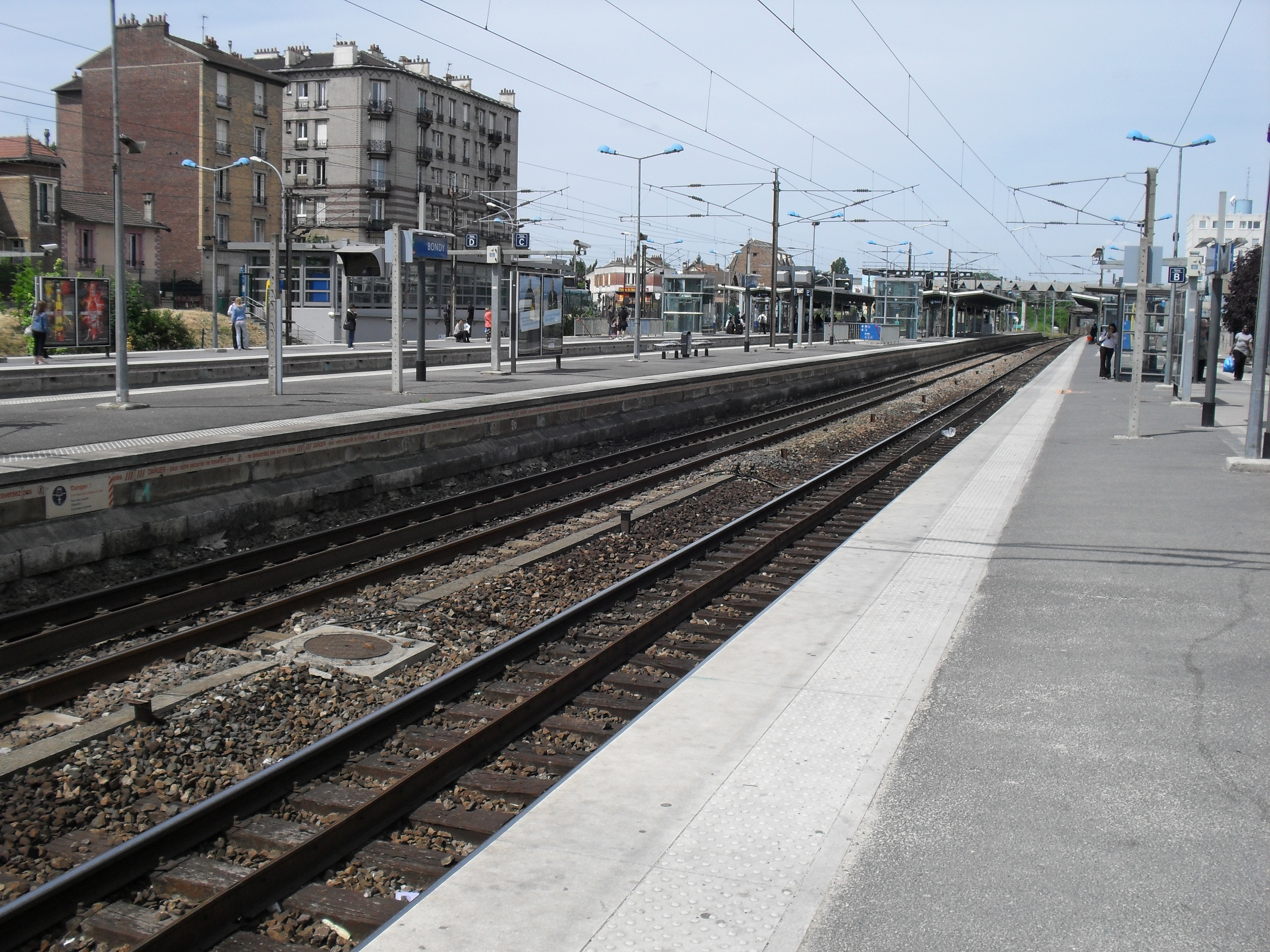
The RER platforms

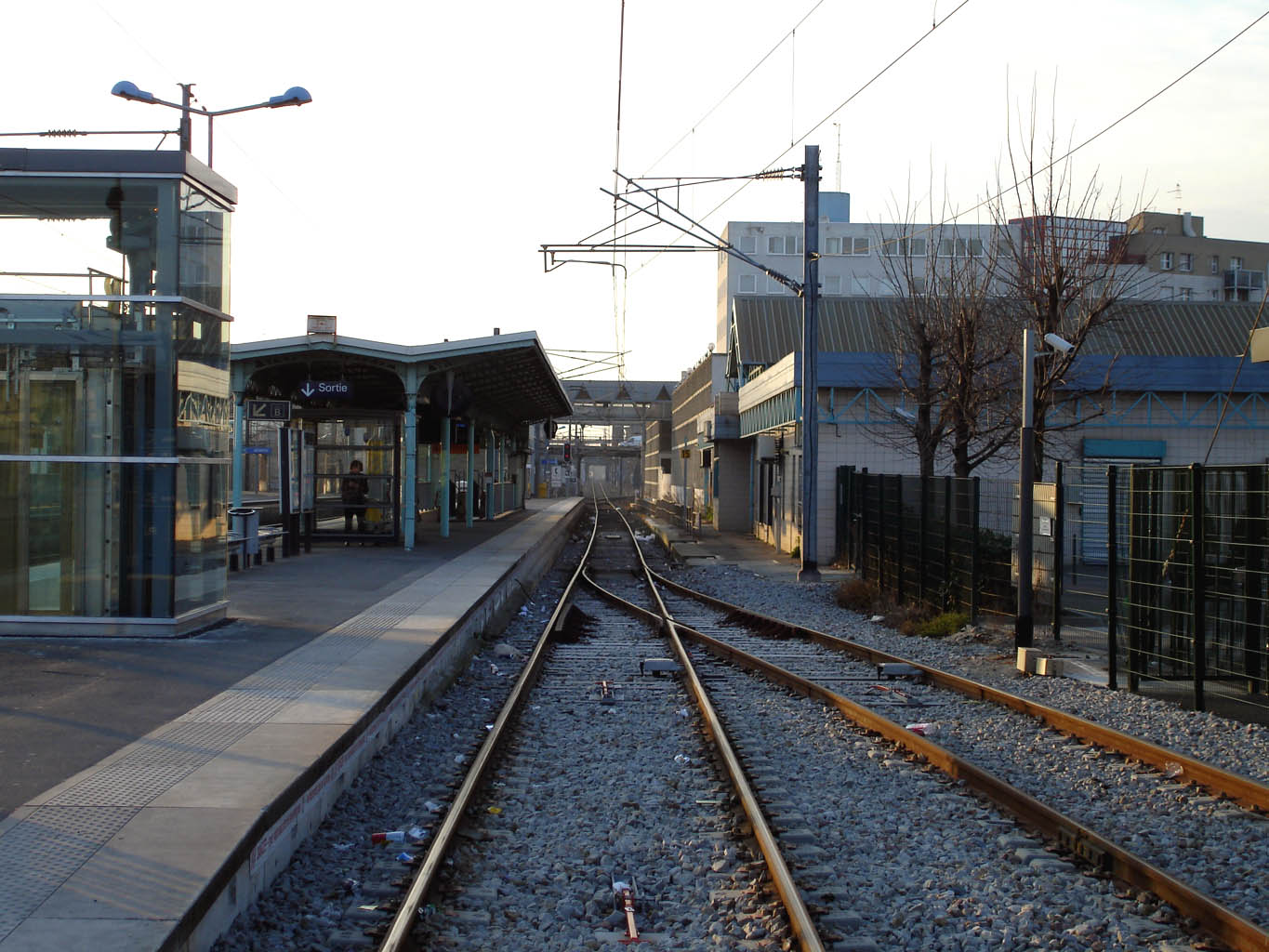
The tram platforms
