= Aulnay-sous-Bois station =

Railway station in Aulnay-sous-Bois, France

Aulnay sous Bois
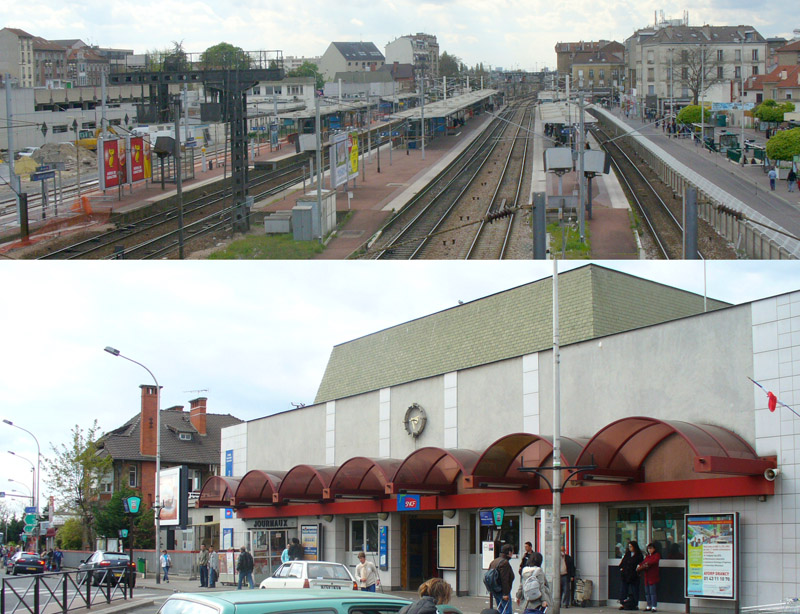
- Aulnay-sous-Bois station

General information
- Location: 5 Place du Général de Gaulle; Aulnay-sous-Bois; France
- Coordinates: 48.932°N 2.494°E
- Operator: SNCF

Construction
- Accessible: Yes, by prior reservation

Other information
- Station code: 87271411
- Fare zone: 4

History
- Opened: 7 August 1875

Passengers
- 2024: 31,683,770

Services
Preceding station	RER	Following station
Sevran Beaudottes towards Aéroport Charles de Gaulle 2 TGV	RER B	Le Blanc-Mesnil towards Robinson or Saint-Rémy-lès-Chevreuse
Sevran – Livry towards Mitry–Claye	RER B	Le Blanc-Mesnil towards Robinson or Saint-Rémy-lès-Chevreuse
Preceding station	Transilien	Following station
Paris-Nord Terminus	Line K	Mitry–Claye towards Crépy-en-Valois
Preceding station	Tram	Following station
Rougemont – Chanteloup towards Bondy	T4 Aulnay-sous-Bois branch	Terminus
Location

Aulnay-sous-Bois station is the major railway station in the town of Aulnay-sous-Bois, in the department of Seine-Saint-Denis). It is on the RER B and the Transilien K lines. The station is also the terminus for tramway T4.

== Photo gallery ==
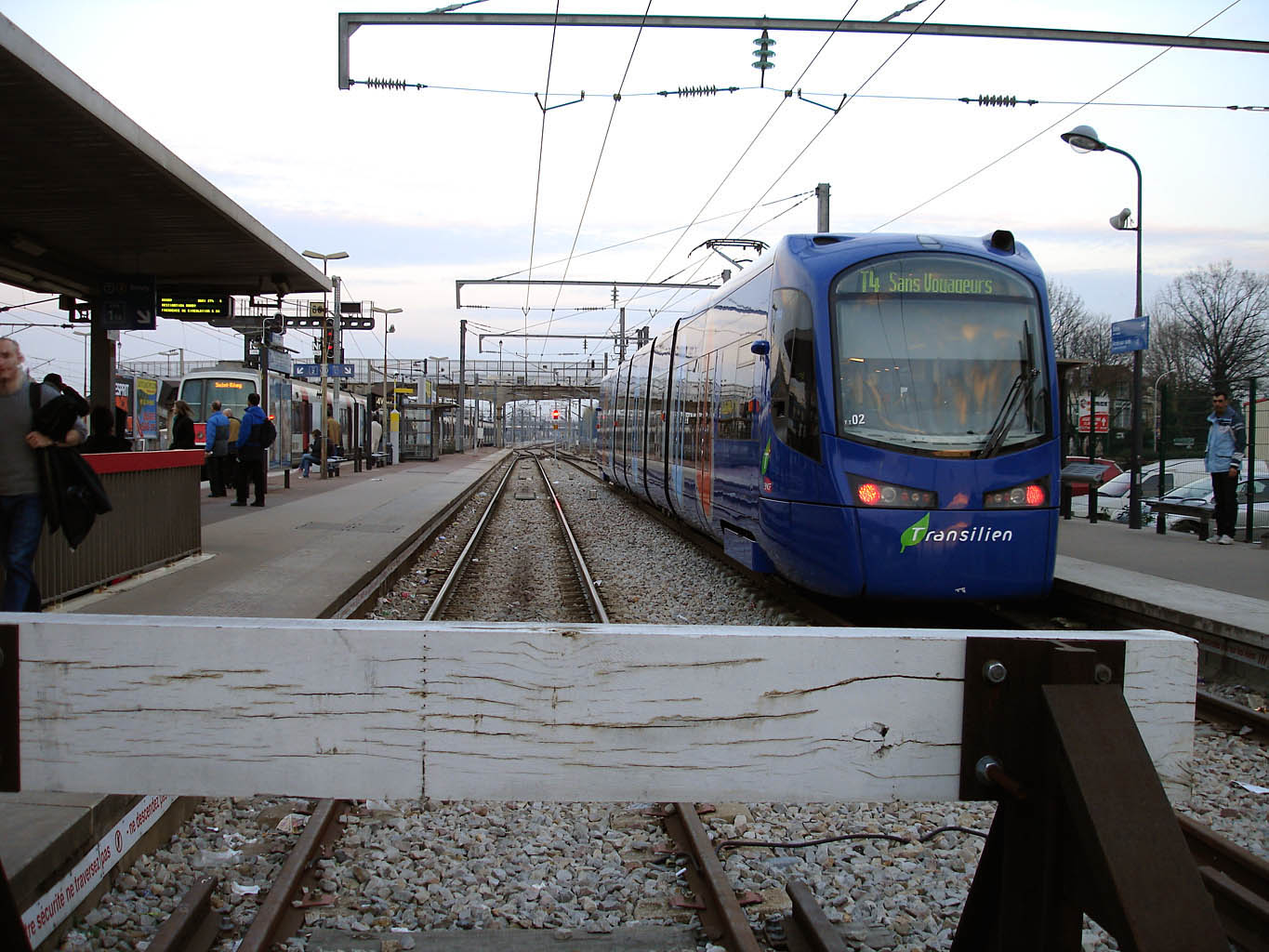
Tram platforms

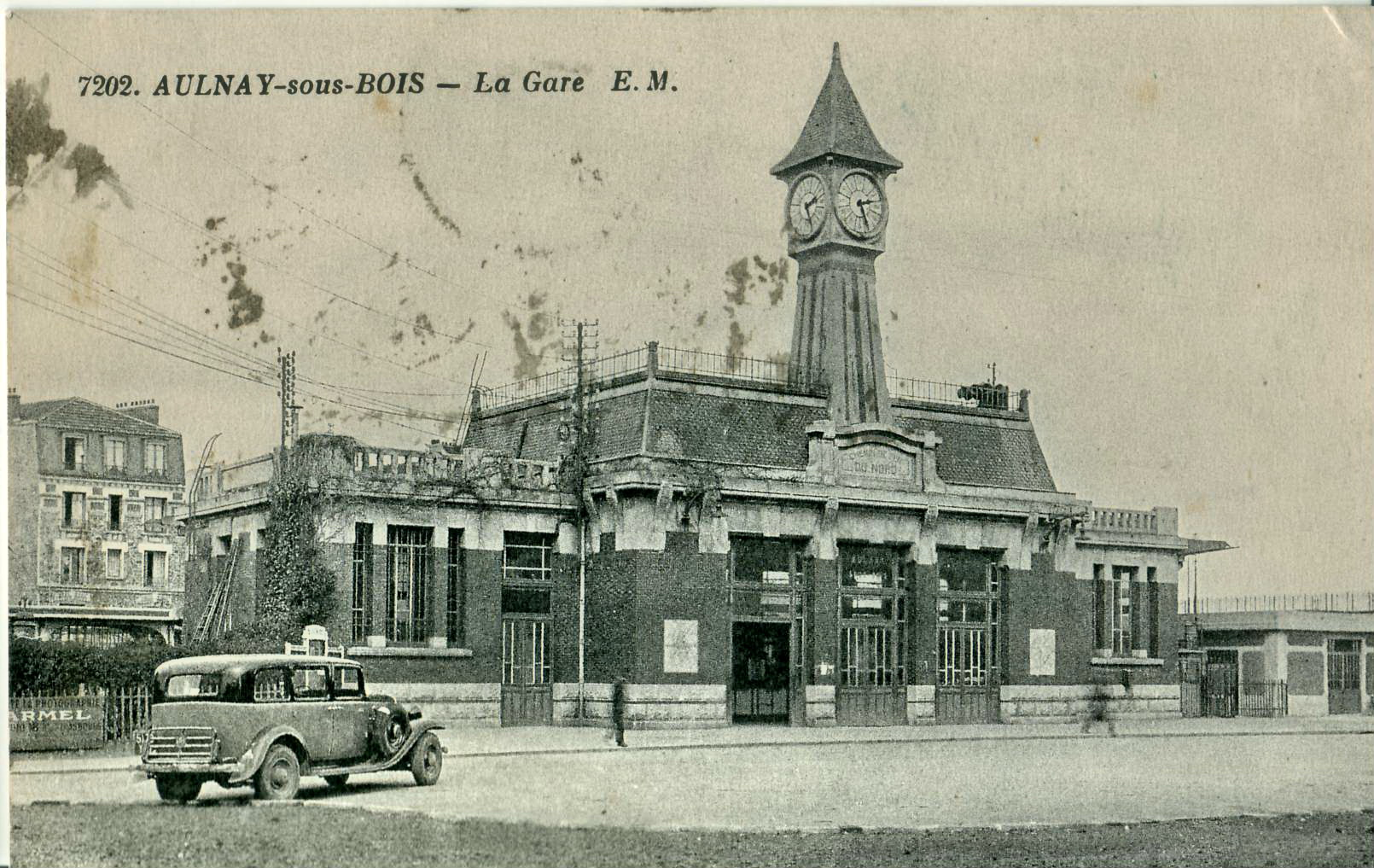

== See also ==
- List of stations of the Paris RER
