= Denfert-Rochereau station (Paris RER) =

Railway station in Paris, France

Denfert-Rochereau Colonel Rol-Tanguy
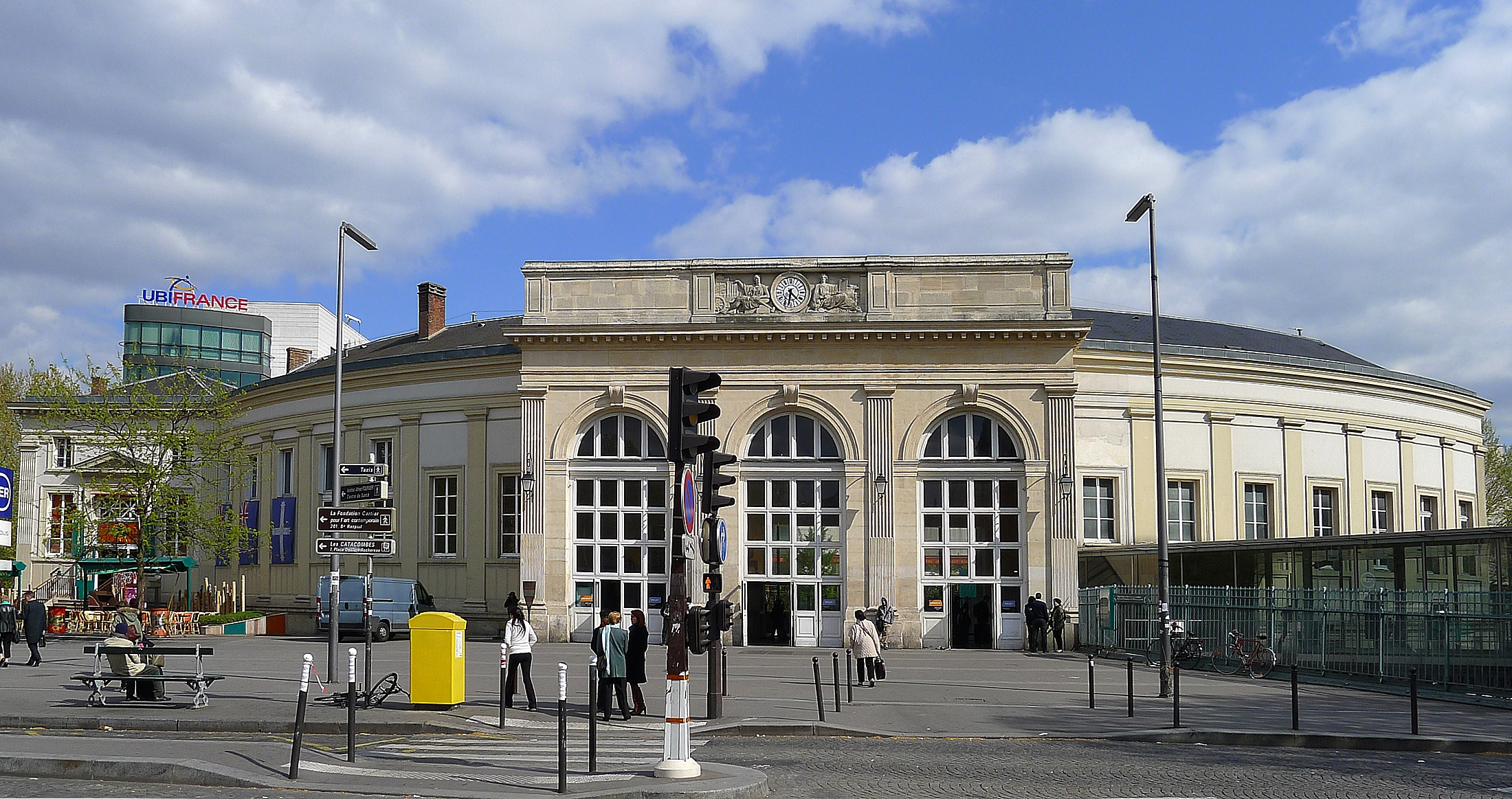
- Denfert-Rochereau station entrance

General information
- Location: Paris; France
- Coordinates: 48°50′02″N 2°19′58″E
- Operator: RATP Group
- Line: Ligne de Sceaux
- Platforms: 3
- Tracks: 3
- Connections: RATP Bus: 38 59 64 68 88 216; Noctilien: N14 N21 N122

Construction
- Structure type: Below-grade
- Accessible: Yes, by request to staff

Other information
- Station code: 87758631
- Fare zone: 3

History
- Opened: 9 June 1846

Passengers
- 2014: 4,332,936

Services
Preceding station	RER	Following station
Port-Royal towards Aéroport Charles de Gaulle 2 TGV or Mitry–Claye	RER B	Cité Universitaire towards Robinson or Saint-Rémy-lès-Chevreuse
Location

Denfert-Rochereau station (French pronunciation: [dɑ̃fɛʁ ʁɔʃʁo]) is a railway station in Paris. It was one of the first stations of the French railway network, and is still in use as a station of Paris' RER line B.

The station was built from 1842 and opened on 7 June 1846 as the Gare d'Enfer (or Gare de Paris-d'Enfer), after the nearby Place d'Enfer (now called the Place Denfert-Rochereau), itself named after the Barrière d'Enfer. The station building has a circular shape as it possessed a rail loop. Indeed, the station was the Parisian terminus of a line from Sceaux. The Ligne de Sceaux used the Arnoux system (after its inventor), as it required the construction of specific engines capable of travelling on very tight curves and broad gauge tracks of 1,750 mm (5 ft 8 7/8 in). The Arnoux system was abandoned in 1891 and the line was converted to 1,435 mm (4 ft 8 1/2 in) (standard) gauge. The line was extended to Luxembourg station in 1895, with the newly created Port-Royal station along the way. At the same time, the station was renamed after Pierre Philippe Denfert-Rochereau. The line was operated by the Chemin de Fer de Paris à Orléans until 1937 when the Compagnie du Chemin de Fer Métropolitain de Paris (CMP) (predecessor of the RATP) took over. It became line B of the RER in 1977 on being extended to meet line A at Châtelet – Les Halles.

The station building of Denfert-Rochereau station is the oldest railway building still standing in Paris.

Denfert-Rochereau remains a station of line B of the Réseau Express Régional and is an interchange with the métro station of the same name, Denfert-Rochereau.
