= La Plaine Stade de France station =

Train station in Saint-Denis, France

La Plaine Stade de France Saint-Denis–Aubervilliers
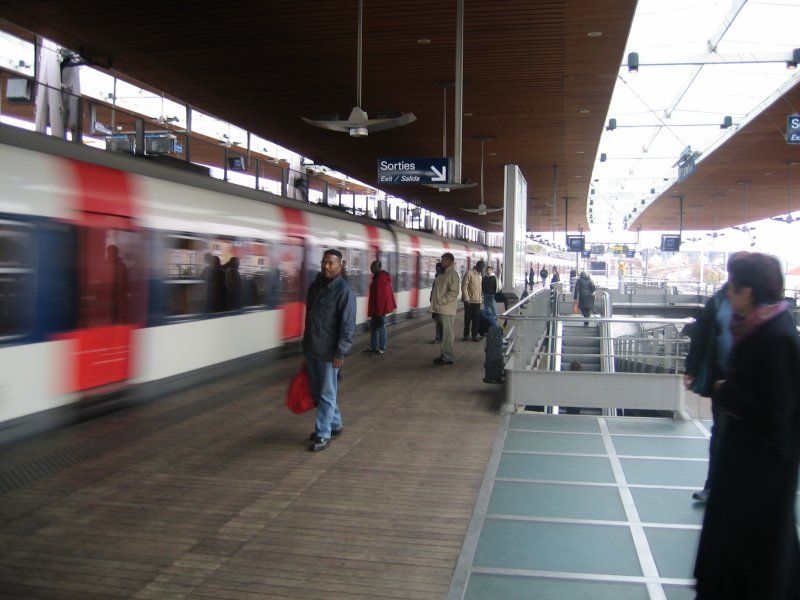
- RER B train at the station

General information
- Location: Place des Droits de l'Homme; 93200 Saint-Denis; France
- Coordinates: 48.917500°N 2.361830°E
- Owner: SNCF
- Platforms: 2
- Tracks: 4

Other information
- Station code: 87164798
- Fare zone: 2

History
- Opened: 25 January 1998

Passengers
- 2024: 14,344,392

Services
Preceding station	RER	Following station
La Courneuve–Aubervilliers towards Aéroport Charles de Gaulle 2 TGV or Mitry–Claye	RER B	Gare du Nord towards Robinson or Saint-Rémy-lès-Chevreuse
Location

La Plaine Stade de France, officially La Plaine Stade de France–Saint-Denis–Aubervilliers, is a station on the line B of the Réseau Express Régional, a hybrid suburban commuter and rapid transit line. In the future, it will also be served by Paris Metro Line 15. It is named after several nearby landmarks, the La Plaine district where the station is located, the nearby Stade de France stadium, the Saint-Denis commune where the station is located, and the nearby Aubervilliers commune. The station is in a suburb of Paris, in the Seine-Saint-Denis department of France.

The Stade de France is also served by the RER D line from another nearby station, Stade de France–Saint-Denis.

== History ==
The station opened on 25 January 1998, in time for the 1998 World Cup, replacing a 1913 station known as La Plaine-Voyaguers. The station is the work of the architect Jean-Marie Duthilleul. The structure of the station is suspended with cables. The architectural style of the station echoes that of the namesake Stade de France stadium.

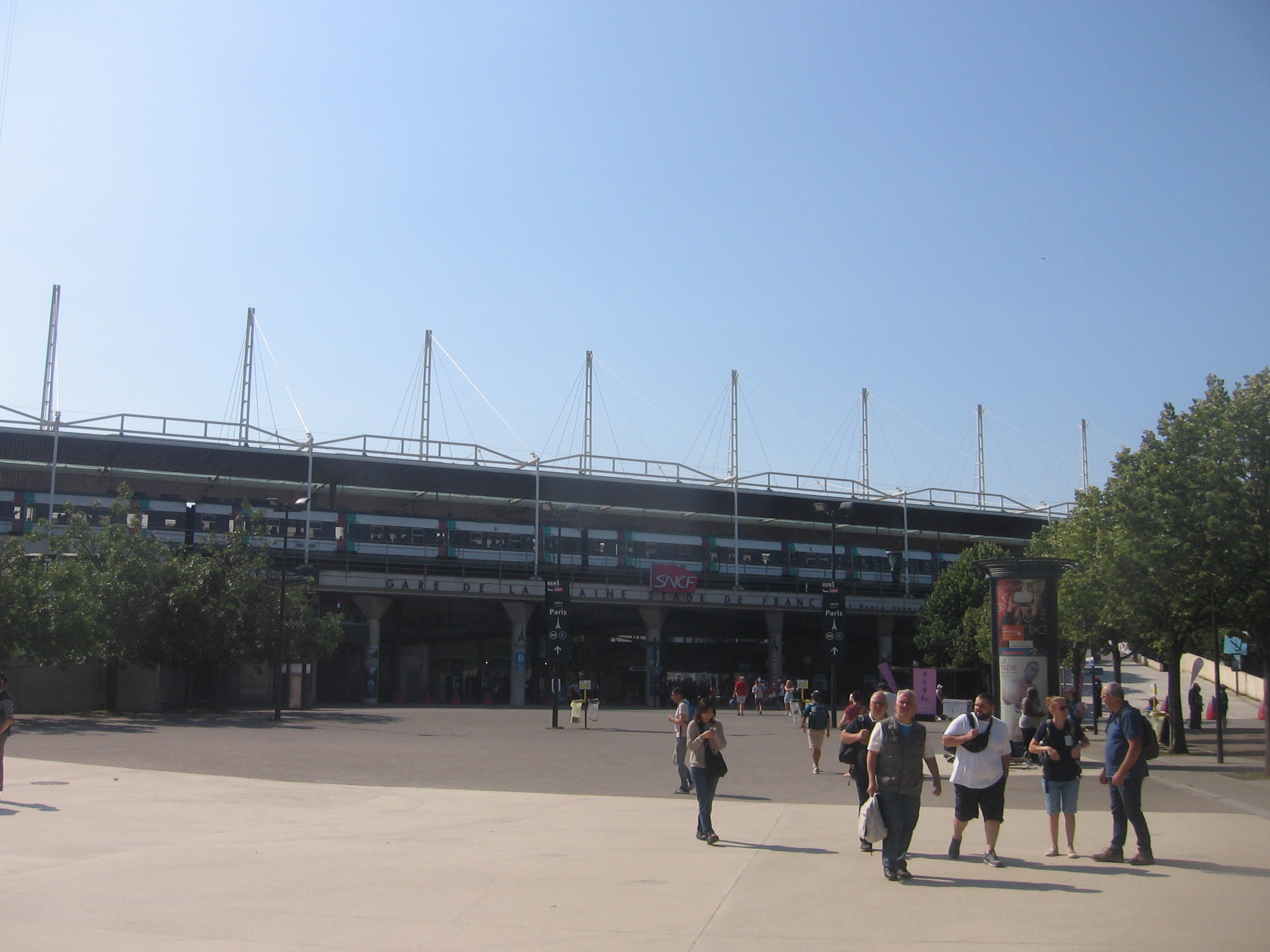
La Plaine Stade de France station

== See also ==
- List of stations of the Paris RER
