= Le Blanc-Mesnil station =

Railway station in Le Blanc-Mesnil, France

Le Blanc Mesnil
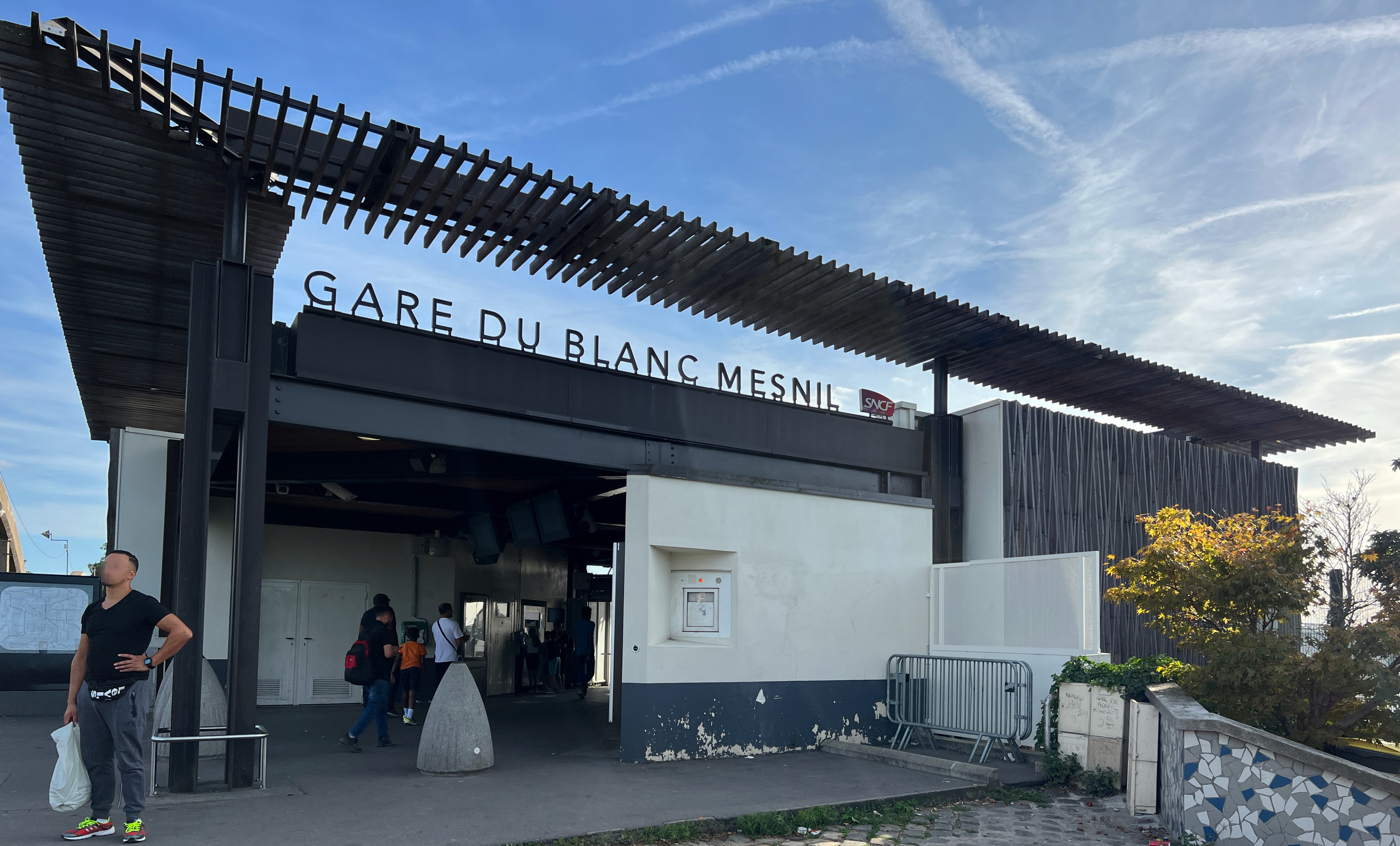
- Le Blanc-Mesnil station entrance

General information
- Location: Rue Pierre Semard; Le Blanc-Mesnil; France
- Coordinates: 48.9322°N 2.4761°E
- Operator: SNCF
- Platforms: 2 island platforms
- Tracks: 4

Construction
- Accessible: Yes, by prior reservation

Other information
- Station code: 87271478
- Fare zone: 3

History
- Opened: 1980

Passengers
- 2024: 4,984,978

Services
Preceding station	RER	Following station
Aulnay-sous-Bois towards Aéroport Charles de Gaulle 2 TGV or Mitry–Claye	RER B	Drancy towards Robinson or Saint-Rémy-lès-Chevreuse
Location

Le Blanc-Mesnil station is a station on the line B of the Réseau Express Régional, a hybrid suburban commuter and rapid transit line. It is named after the village of Blanc-Mesnil where the station is located.
