= Villepinte station =

Railway station in Villepinte, France

Villepinte
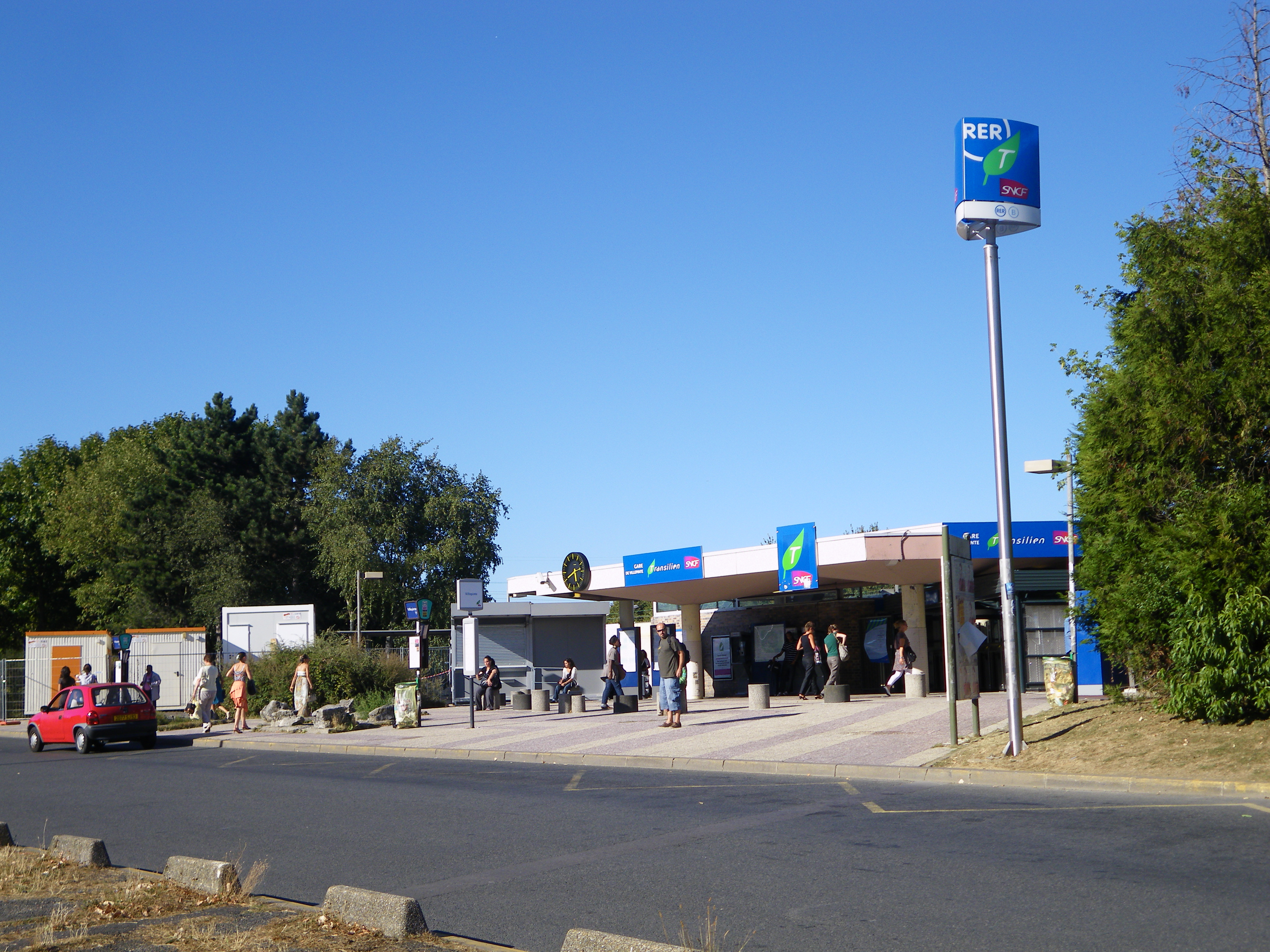
- Entrance to Villepinte station

General information
- Location: Route Camille Pissarro; Villepinte; France
- Coordinates: 48.9628°N 2.5122°E
- Operator: SNCF
- Platforms: 2

Construction
- Accessible: Yes, by prior reservation

Other information
- Station code: 87271452
- Fare zone: 4

Passengers
- 2024: 2,631,037

Services
Preceding station	RER	Following station
Parc des Expositions towards Aéroport Charles de Gaulle 2 TGV or Mitry–Claye	RER B	Sevran Beaudottes towards Robinson or Saint-Rémy-lès-Chevreuse
Location

Villepinte is a station on the RER B's Airport branch. The station is in Villepinte, a northern suburb of Paris, in Seine-Saint-Denis department, France. The station is located in the Parc Départemental du Sausset.
