= Drancy station =

Railway station in Drancy, France

Drancy
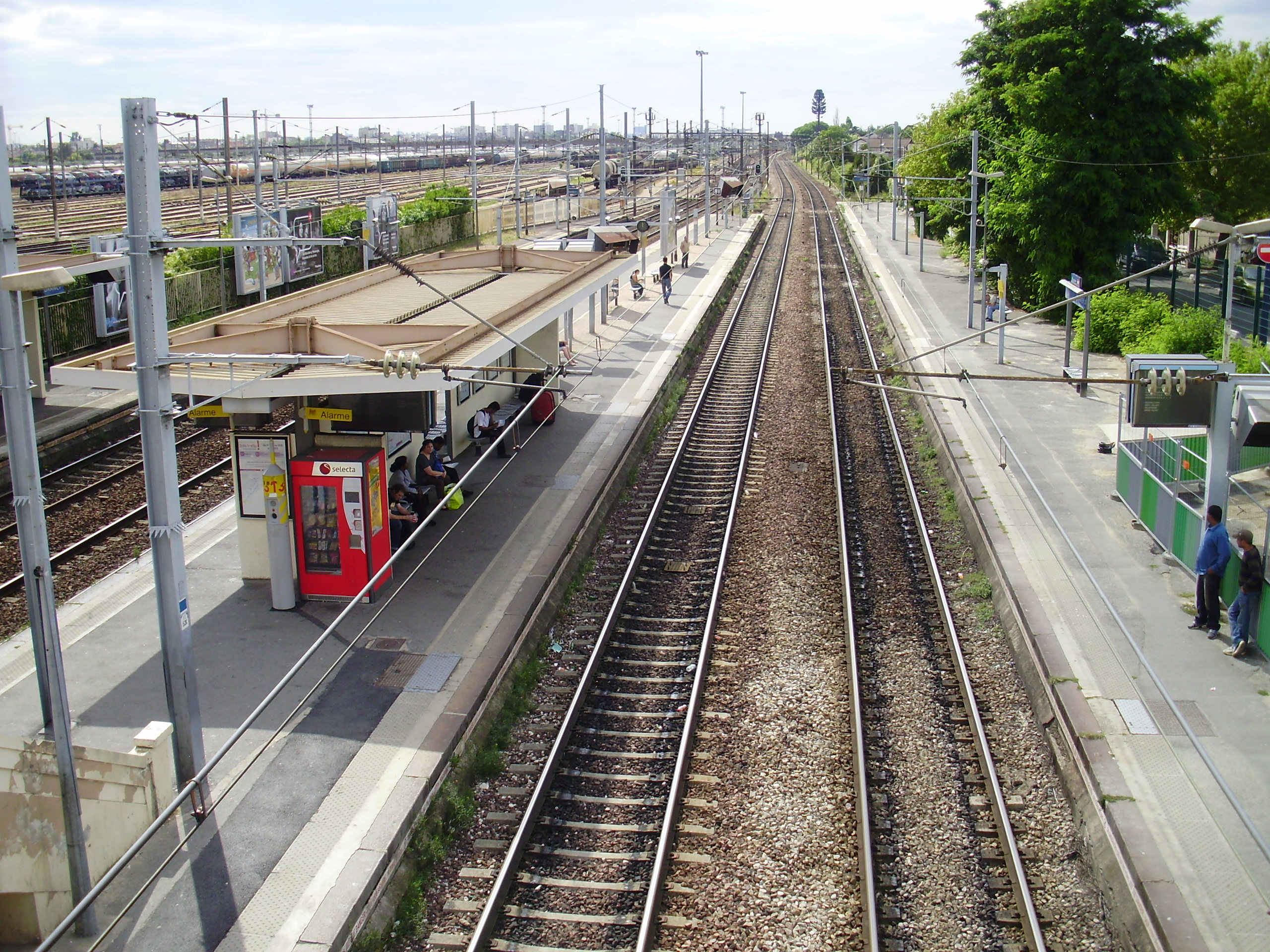
- Drancy station platforms

General information
- Location: 169 Rue Anatole-France; Drancy; France
- Coordinates: 48°55′57″N 2°27′17″E
- Operator: SNCF
- Platforms: 1 island platform 2 side platforms
- Tracks: 4

Construction
- Accessible: Yes, by prior reservation

Other information
- Station code: 87271403
- Fare zone: 3

Passengers
- 2024: 9,869,635

Services
Preceding station	RER	Following station
Le Blanc-Mesnil towards Aéroport Charles de Gaulle 2 TGV or Mitry–Claye	RER B	Le Bourget towards Robinson or Saint-Rémy-lès-Chevreuse
Location

Drancy station (French: Gare de Drancy) is an RER B station in Drancy, a northern suburb of Paris, in Seine-Saint-Denis department, France.
