= Sceaux station =

Railway station in Sceaux, France

Sceaux
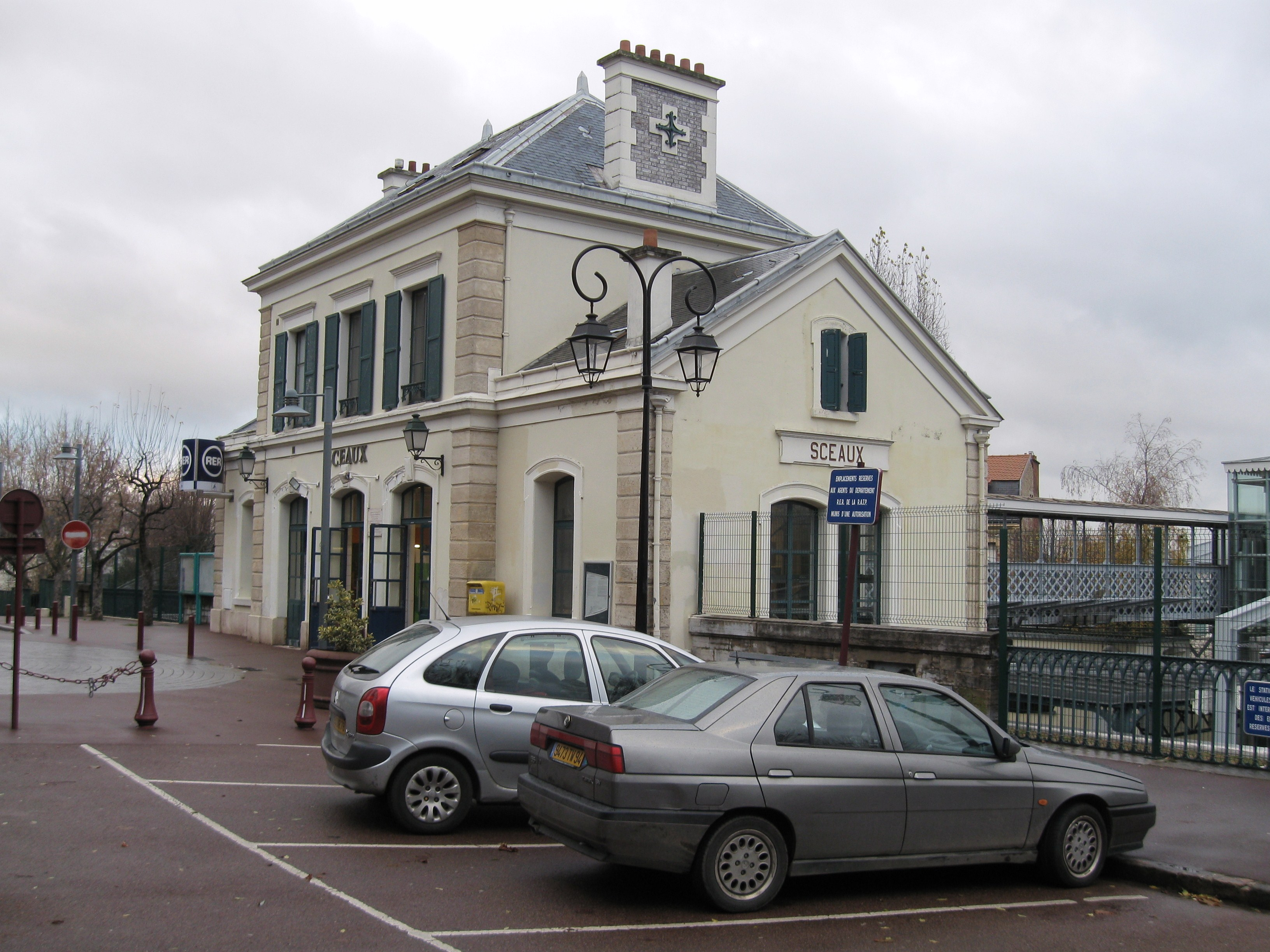
- Entrance to Sceaux station

General information
- Location: Rue Raymond Gachelin; Sceaux; France
- Coordinates: 48°46′53″N 2°17′50″E
- Operator: RATP Group
- Line: Ligne de Sceaux
- Platforms: 2 side platforms
- Tracks: 2

Construction
- Structure type: Below-grade
- Accessible: Yes, by request to staff

Other information
- Station code: 87758706
- Fare zone: 3

History
- Opened: 1893

Passengers
- 2019: 732,895

Services
Preceding station	RER	Following station
Bourg-la-Reine towards Aéroport Charles de Gaulle 2 TGV or Mitry–Claye	RER B	Fontenay-aux-Roses towards Robinson
Location

Sceaux station is a station on the RER B of the Réseau Express Régional, a hybrid suburban commuter and rapid transit line. It is named after the town where it is located, Sceaux.

== See also ==
- List of stations of the Paris RER
