= Parc de Sceaux station =

Railway station in Antony, France

Parc de Sceaux
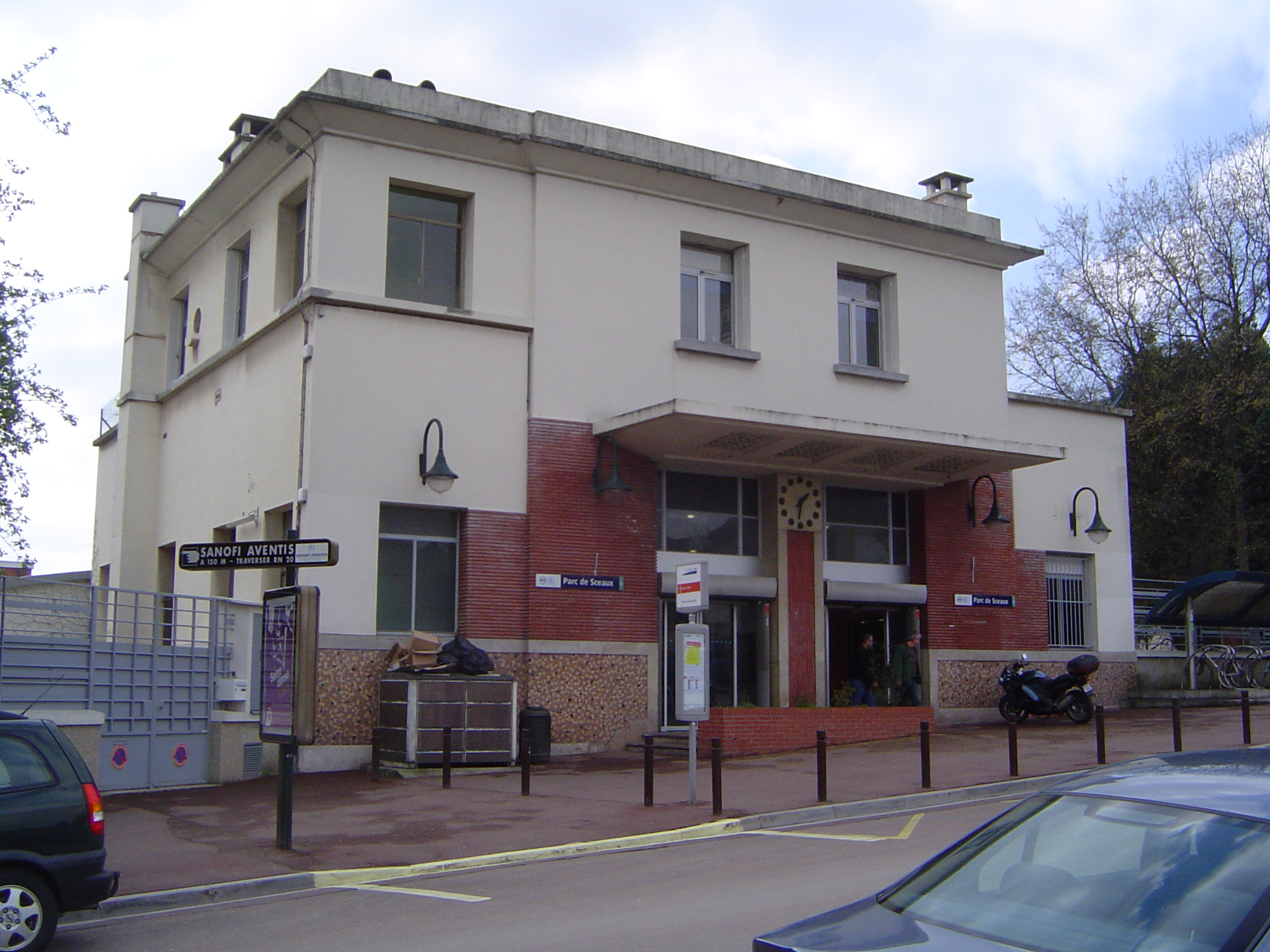
- Entrance to station

General information
- Location: Antony; France
- Coordinates: 48°46′14″N 2°18′37″E
- Operator: RATP Group
- Line: Ligne de Sceaux
- Platforms: 2 side platforms
- Tracks: 2

Construction
- Structure type: Below-grade
- Accessible: Yes, by request to staff

Other information
- Station code: 87758730
- Fare zone: 3

Passengers
- 2019: 574,699

Services
Preceding station	RER	Following station
Bourg-la-Reine towards Aéroport Charles de Gaulle 2 TGV or Mitry–Claye	RER B	La Croix de Berny towards Saint-Rémy-lès-Chevreuse
Location

Parc de Sceaux (French pronunciation: [paʁk də so]) is one of the Paris RER B stations, located in the city of Antony, Hauts-de-Seine, France. This is also the name of a park and castle from Jean-Baptiste Colbert.

== See also ==
- List of stations of the Paris RER
