= Luxembourg station (Paris) =

Railway station in Paris, France

Luxembourg Sénat
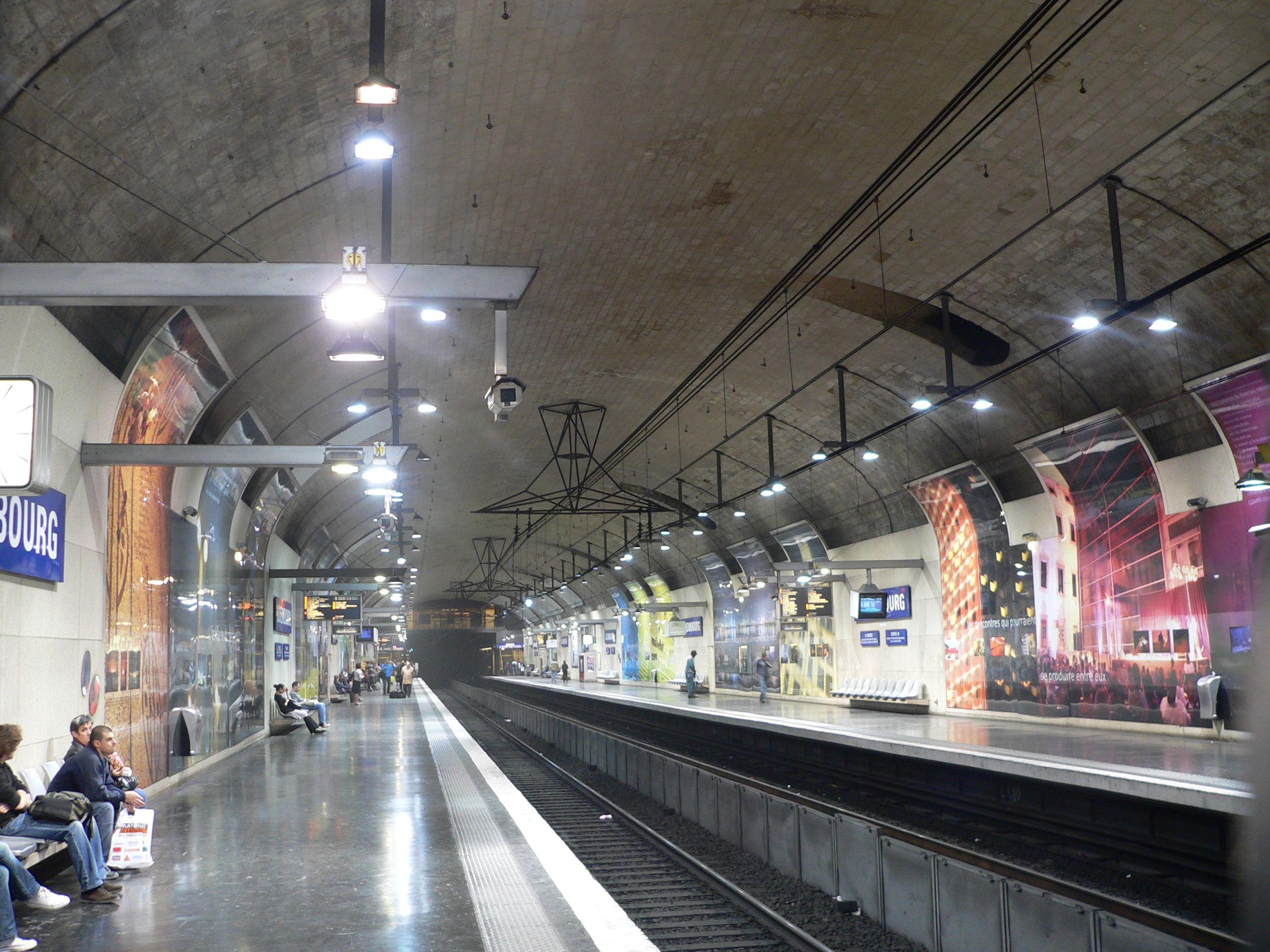
- Luxembourg station platforms

General information
- Location: Paris; France
- Coordinates: 48°50′48″N 2°20′25″E
- Operator: RATP Group
- Line: Ligne de Sceaux
- Platforms: 2 side platforms
- Tracks: 2
- Connections: RATP Bus: 21 24 27 38 82 84 89; Noctilien: N14 N21 N122

Construction
- Structure type: Underground
- Accessible: Yes, by request to staff

Other information
- Station code: 87758615
- Fare zone: 1

History
- Opened: 31 March 1895
- Rebuilt: 1977

Passengers
- 2015: 5,670,876

Services
Preceding station	RER	Following station
St-Michel – Notre-Dame towards Aéroport Charles de Gaulle 2 TGV or Mitry–Claye	RER B	Port-Royal towards Robinson or Saint-Rémy-lès-Chevreuse
Location

Luxembourg (French pronunciation: [lyksɑ̃buʁ]) is a French railway station on the RER B line in Paris. It is located on the Rive Gauche under Boulevard Saint-Michel on the border between the 5th and 6th arrondissements, just east of the Jardin du Luxembourg and southeast of the Palais du Luxembourg. In 2015, it was used by 5,670,876 passengers.

== History ==
The Luxembourg station opened as the northern terminus of the Ligne de Sceaux in 1895. The Ligne de Sceaux was converted into the RER B line of the Réseau Express Régional network in 1977, following the construction of a 2,600-metre tunnel that extended the line under the Seine to Châtelet–Les Halles. The Luxembourg station was rebuilt during this period and is now situated half a meter deeper than the previous station.

The station was extensively renovated in 2000. In 2009, large-scale excavation work began to create better accessibility to disabled passengers, including new elevators. In 2010, this work was stopped due to a building permit issue and for more than two years the ticket offices were relocated to a shelter located at street level. The improved access for disabled passengers was completed in 2019.

On 14 December 1918, a train carrying United States President Woodrow Wilson and his entourage pulled into the station. In less than a month, Wilson would be part of the "Big Three" at the Paris Peace Conference, where the Treaty of Versailles was drawn up and signed on 28 June 1919, effectively ending the First World War.

== Nearby ==
- Palais du Luxembourg
- Jardin du Luxembourg
- Petit Luxembourg
- Panthéon
- Musée de Minéralogie
