= Fontenay-aux-Roses station =

Railway station in Fontenay-aux-Roses, France

Fontenay-aux-Roses
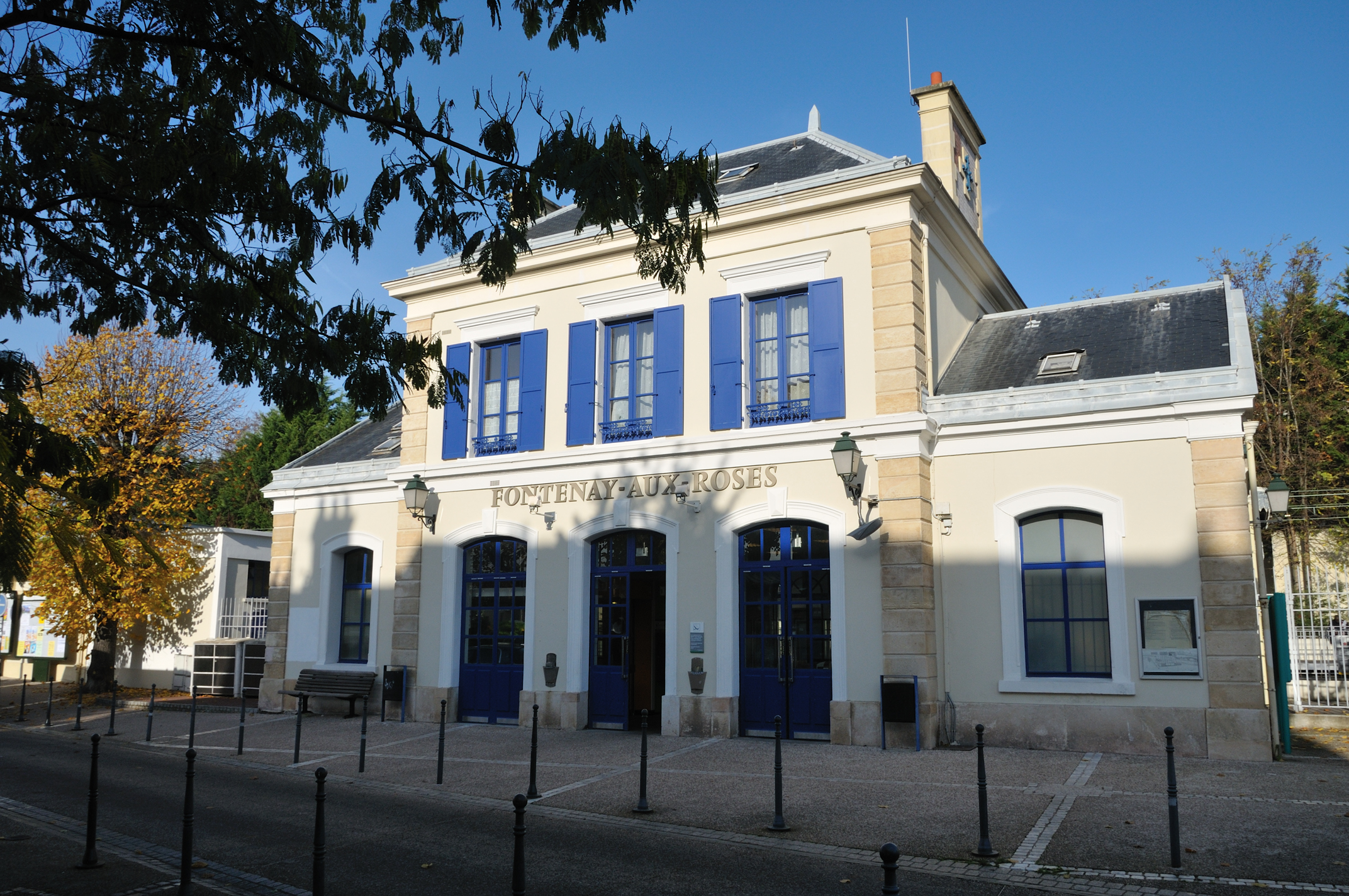
- Entrance to the station

General information
- Location: Fontenay-aux-Roses; France
- Coordinates: 48°47′15″N 2°17′32″E
- Operator: RATP Group
- Line: Ligne de Sceaux
- Platforms: 2 side platforms
- Tracks: 2

Construction
- Structure type: Below-grade
- Accessible: Yes, by request to staff

Other information
- Station code: 87758714
- Fare zone: 3

History
- Opened: 1892

Passengers
- 2019: 1,211,339

Services
Preceding station	RER	Following station
Sceaux towards Aéroport Charles de Gaulle 2 TGV or Mitry–Claye	RER B	Robinson Terminus
Location

Fontenay-aux-Roses station is a station on the line B of the Réseau Express Régional, a hybrid suburban commuter and rapid transit line. It is named after the town it is located in, Fontenay-aux-Roses.

== See also ==
- List of stations of the Paris RER
