= RER B =

Transit system serving Paris, France and its suburbs

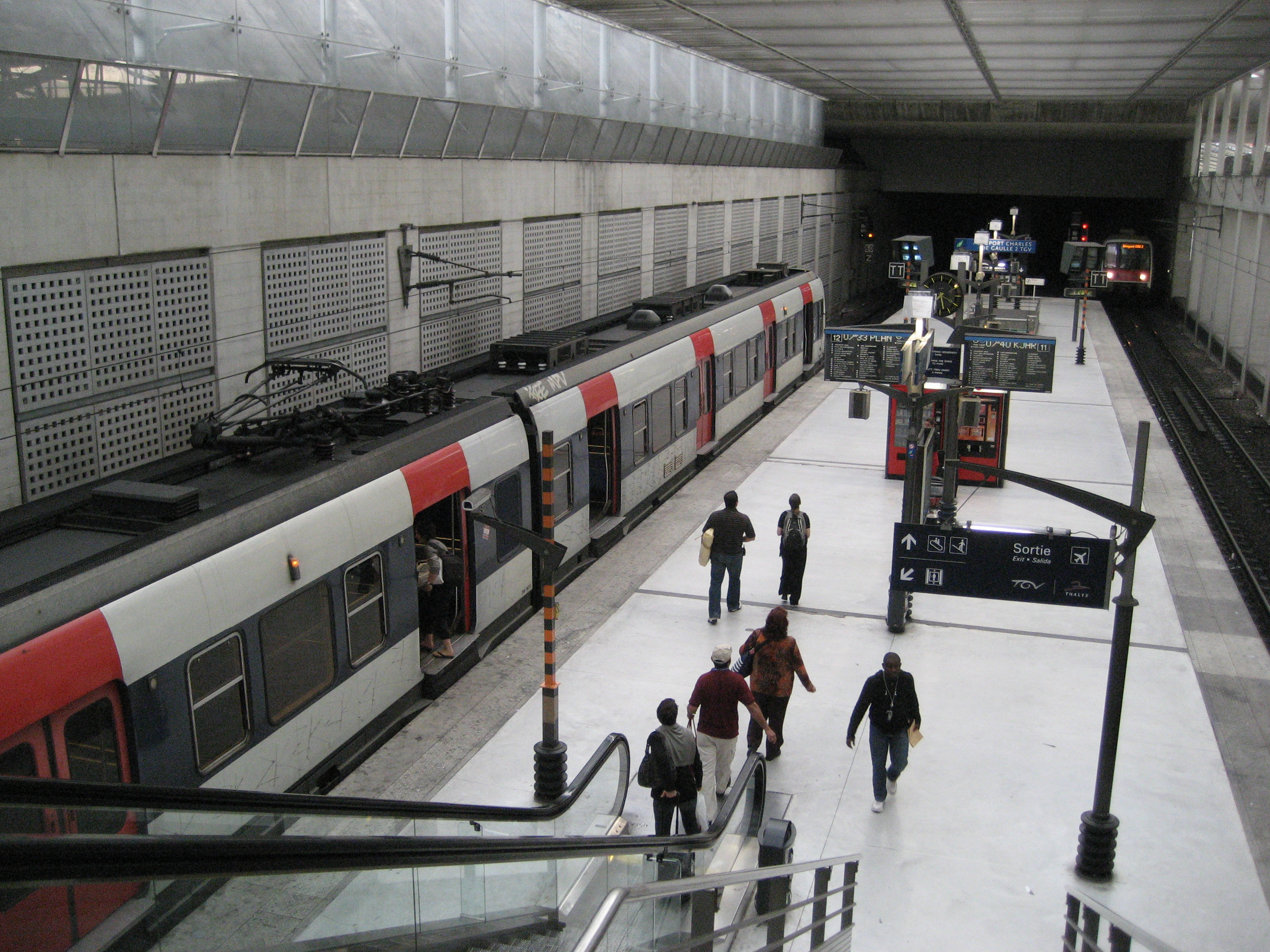
- RER B train at Aéroport Charles de Gaulle 2 TGV

Overview
- Termini: Aéroport Charles de Gaulle 2 TGV (B3), Mitry–Claye (B5); Robinson (B2), Saint-Rémy-lès-Chevreuse (B4)
- Connecting lines: Paris Metro Paris Metro Line 1 Paris Metro Line 2 Paris Metro Line 3 Paris Metro Line 4 Paris Metro Line 6 Paris Metro Line 7 Paris Metro Line 10 Paris Metro Line 11 Paris Metro Line 14 RER RER A RER C RER D RER E Transilien Transilien Line H (Paris-Nord) Transilien Line K (Paris-Nord) Tramways in Île-de-France Île-de-France tramway Line 3a Île-de-France tramway Line 4 Île-de-France tramway Line 10 Île-de-France tramway Line 11 Île-de-France tramway Line 12 Orlyval
- Stations: 47

Service
- Type: Rapid transit/commuter rail
- System: Réseau Express Régional
- Operator: RATP/SNCF
- Rolling stock: MI 79, MI 84
- Ridership: 165 million journeys per annum (2004)

History
- Opened: 8 December 1977; 48 years ago
- Last extension: 1994; 32 years ago

Technical
- Line length: 80 km (50 mi)
- Track gauge: 1,435 mm (4 ft 8 1/2 in) standard gauge
- Electrification: Overhead line: 25 kV 50 Hz AC; 1,500 V DC
Route map

RER B is one of the five lines in the Réseau Express Régional (English: Regional Express Network), a hybrid commuter rail and rapid transit system serving Paris, France and its Île-de-France suburbs. The 80-kilometre (50 mi) RER B line crosses the region from north to south, with all trains serving a group of stations in central Paris, before branching out towards the ends of the line.

The line opened in stages starting in December 1977 by connecting two existing suburban commuter rail lines with a new tunnel under Paris: the Chemin de Fer du Nord to the north (which formerly terminated at Gare du Nord) and the Ligne de Sceaux to the south (which formerly terminated at Luxembourg station).

The RER B, along with the rest of the RER network, has had a significant social impact on Paris and the surrounding region by speeding up trips across central Paris, by making far fewer stops than the Paris Métro and by bringing far-flung suburbs within easy reach of the city centre. The line has far exceeded all traffic expectations, with passengers taking 165 million journeys per year in 2004. That makes the RER B the second busiest single rail line in Europe (after RER A).

The line faces capacity challenges as a result of sharing a tunnel with RER D trains between Châtelet–Les Halles and Gare du Nord.

== Chronology ==
The RER B opened in stages starting in December 1977 by connecting two existing suburban commuter rail lines with a new tunnel under Paris: the Chemin de Fer du Nord to the north (which formerly terminated at Gare du Nord) and the Ligne de Sceaux to the south (which formerly terminated at Luxembourg station).

- June 1846: The Ligne de Sceaux from Massy to Denfert-Rochereau opens to the public.
- 1862: The Chemin de Fer du Nord line from Paris to Soissons via Mitry-Claye is opened.
- 1895: The Ligne de Sceaux is extended from Denfert-Rochereau to Luxembourg.
- 1937: The CMP (the operator of the Paris Métro and predecessor of today's RATP) purchases the Ligne de Sceaux, planning to integrate it into a future regional metro network, now known as the Réseau Express Régional (RER).
- May 1976: A new 13.5 km (8.4 mi) long branch from Aulnay-sous-Bois to Paris-Charles de Gaulle Airport (terminal 1) is opened, linking the airport with Paris.
- December 1977: The Ligne de Sceaux is extended north 2 km (1.2 mi) from Luxembourg station to Châtelet-les Halles station and becomes the RER B.
- December 1981: The RER B is extended north 2.5 km (1.6 mi) from Châtelet-les Halles station to Gare du Nord connecting with trains to Mitry-Claye and the airport. Because the lines north of Gare du Nord used a different electrification system (1.5 kV DC to the south, 25 kV AC to the north), passengers need to make a cross-platform transfer between trains on the north and south lines.
- January 1983: A new station, Parc-des-Expositions, opens between Villepinte and Roissy.
- June 1983: Improvements and dual-voltage equipment allow trains to begin traveling through Gare du Nord and across the entire length of the line.
- February 1988: A new station, St-Michel – Notre-Dame opens between Luxembourg and Châtelet to offer a quick connection with RER C and Paris Métro Line 10 at Cluny – La Sorbonne, a station which had been closed since World War II and was entirely renovated.
- October 1991: OrlyVAL line opens, connecting Antony station with Orly Airport.
- November 1994: The line is extended 1 km (0.62 mi) north to Aéroport Charles de Gaulle 2 – TGV.
- January 1998: A new station, La Plaine–Stade de France, opens near the Stade de France in time for the 1998 FIFA World Cup.

== List of RER B stations ==
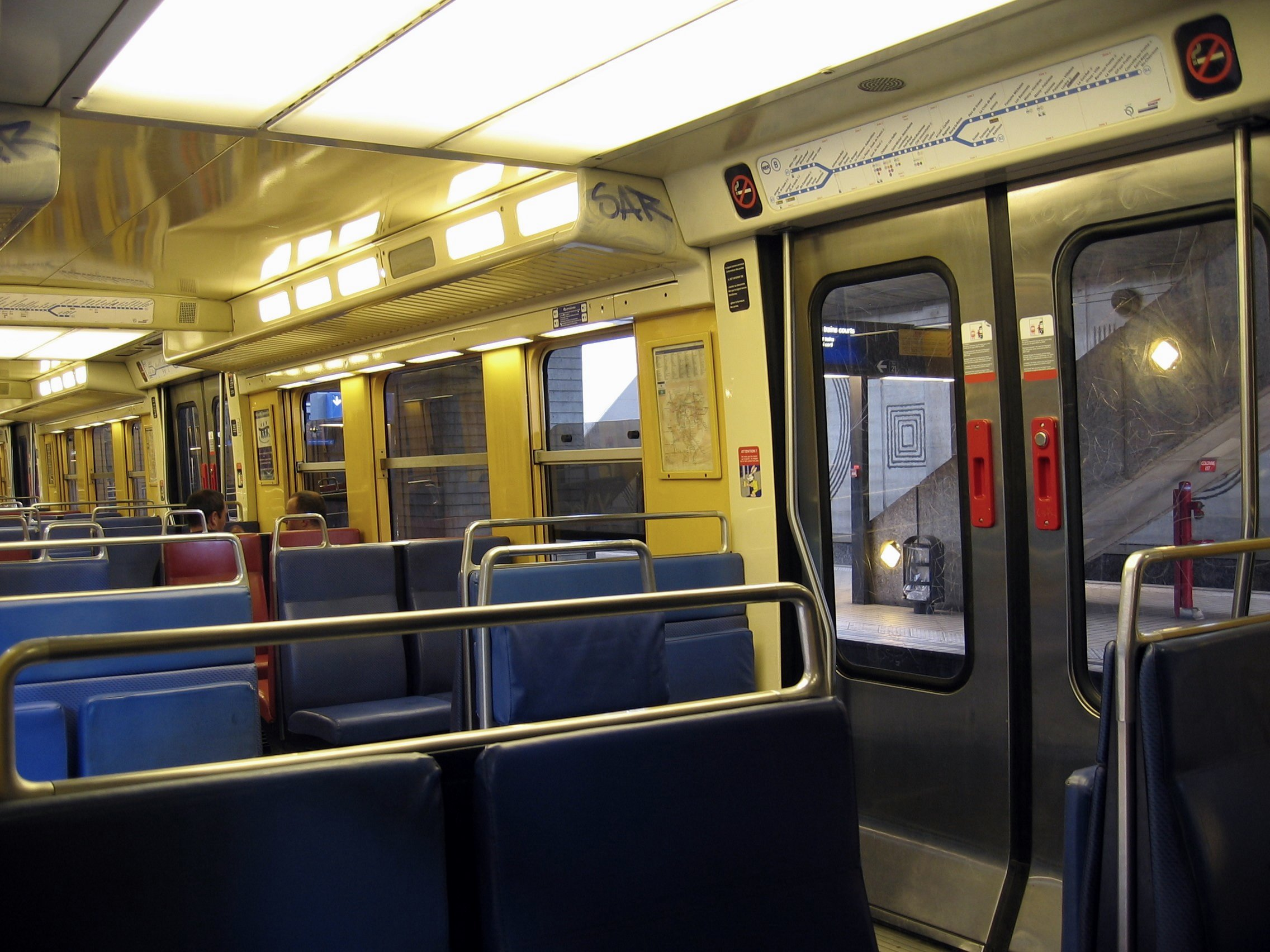
Inside an RER B train

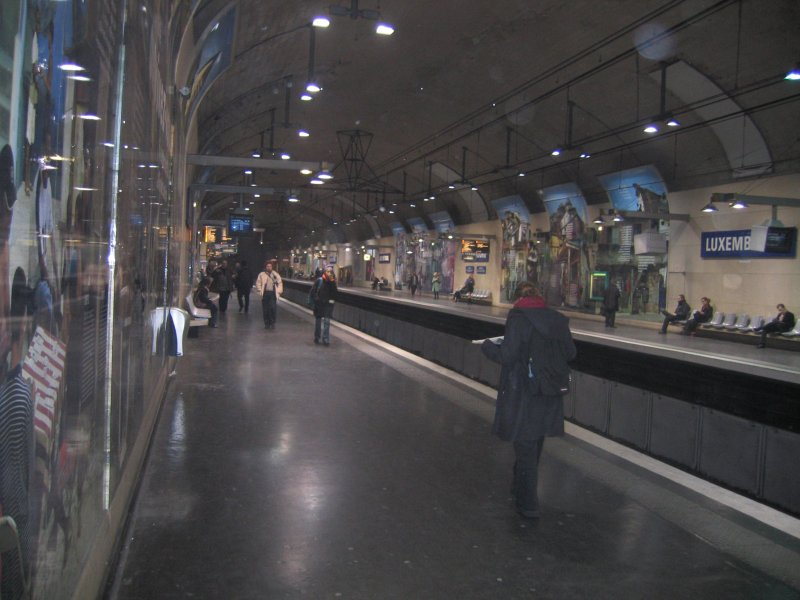
Luxembourg on the RER B.

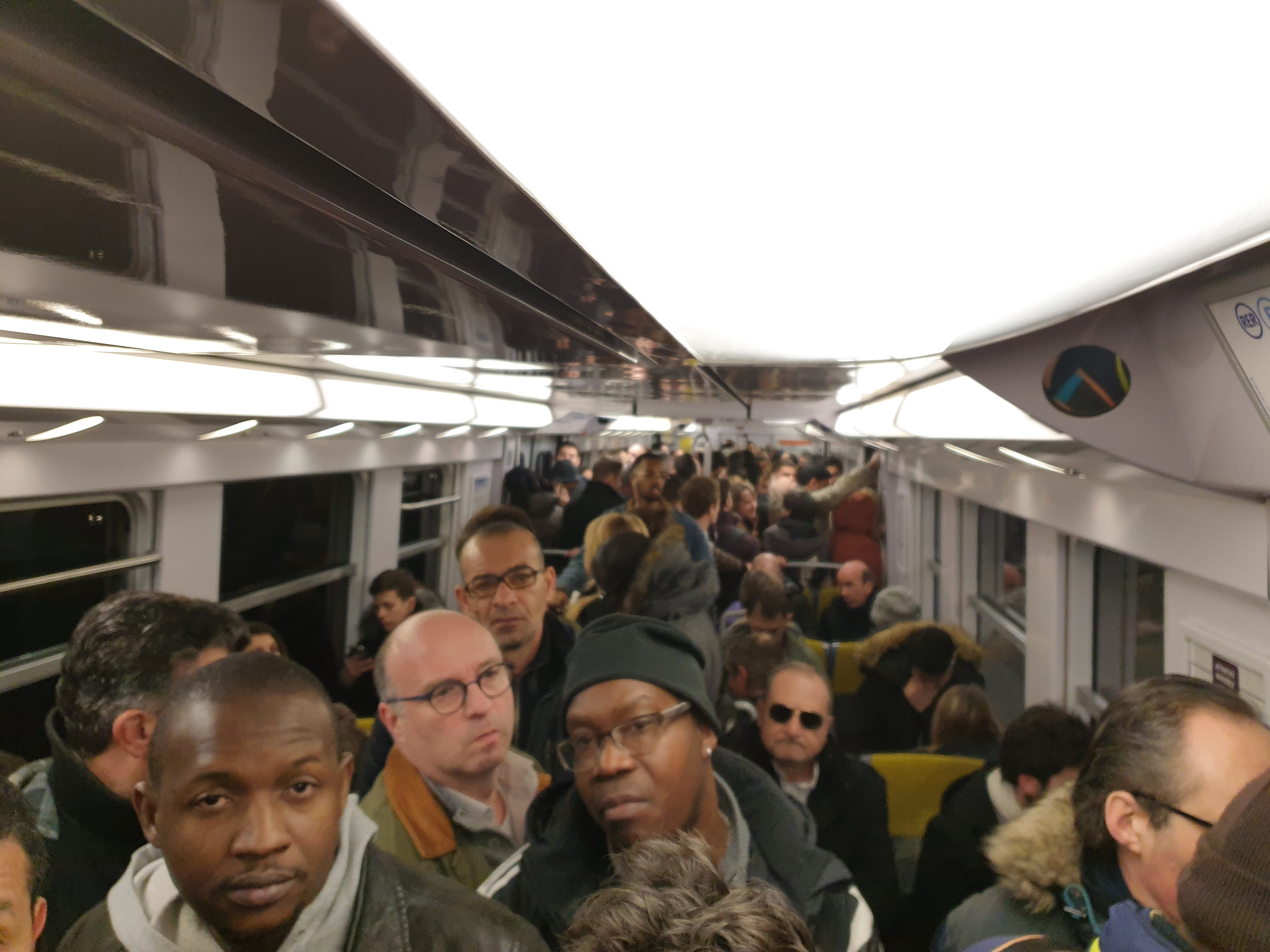
Inside an RER B train

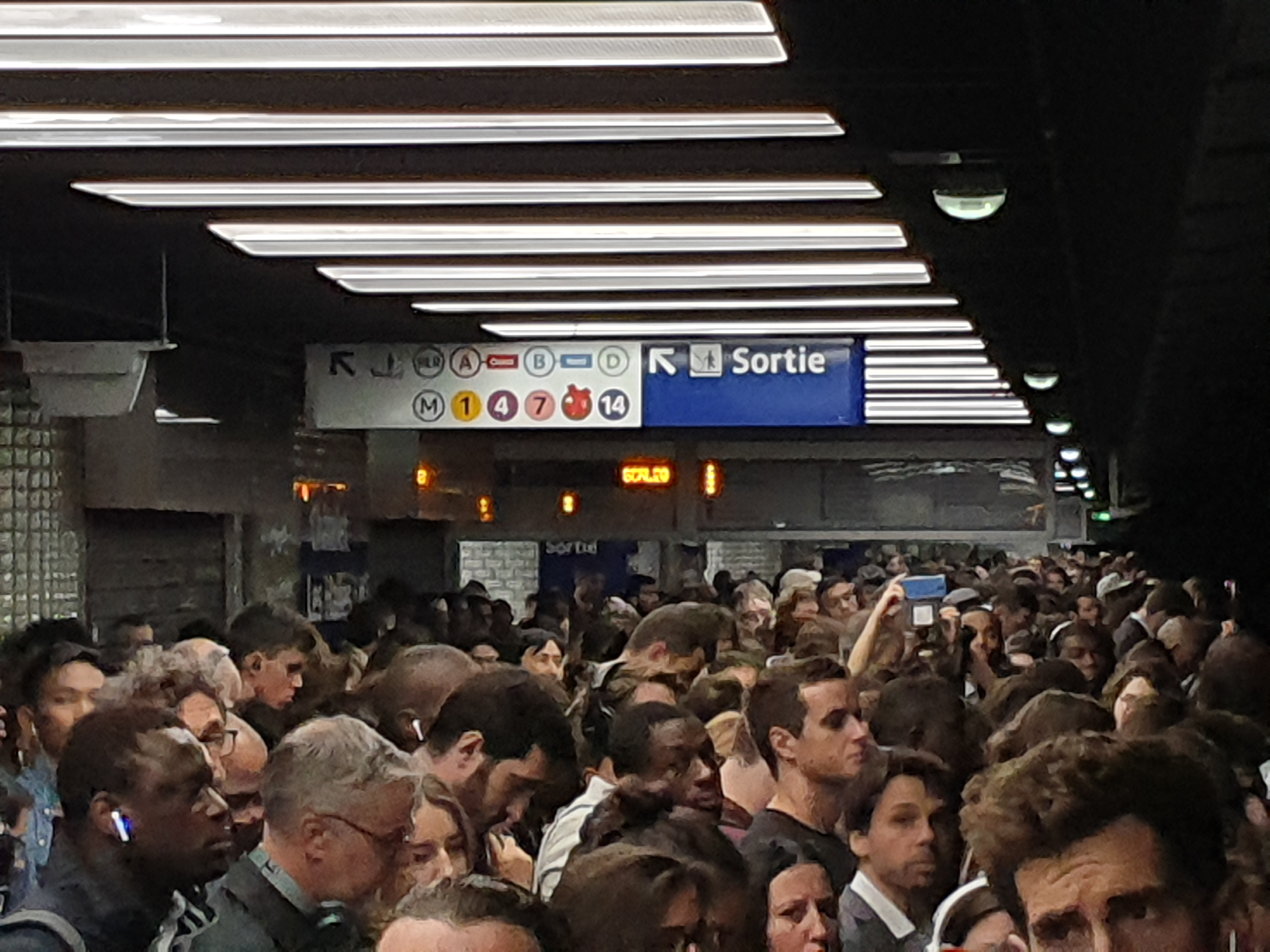
Travelers waiting for RER B at Châtelet–Les Halles during a day of strike in 2019

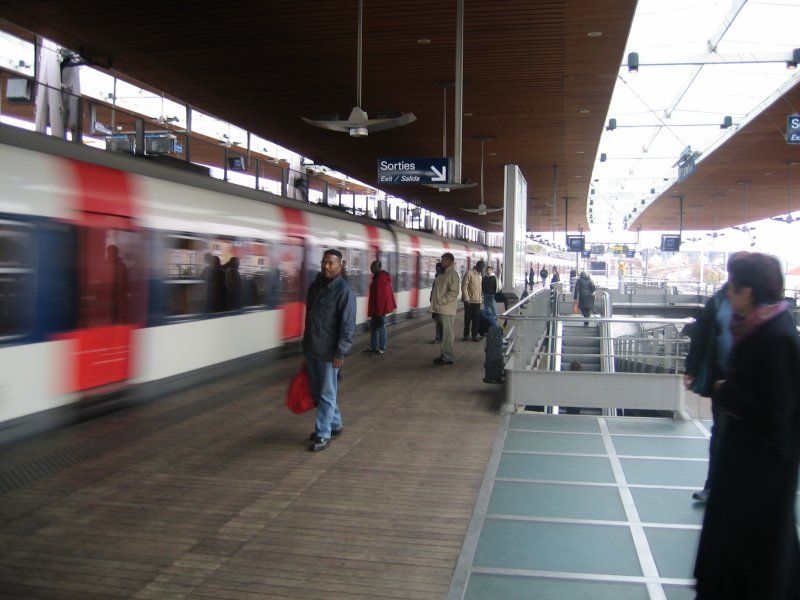
RER B at La Plaine – Stade de France.

| Branch | Station | Zone |
|---|---|---|
| B3 | Aéroport Charles de Gaulle 2 TGV | 5 |
| B3 | Aéroport Charles de Gaulle 1 | 5 |
| B3 | Parc des Expositions | 4 |
| B3 | Villepinte | 4 |
| B3 | Sevran Beaudottes | 4 |
| B5 | Mitry–Claye | 5 |
| B5 | Villeparisis–Mitry-le-Neuf | 5 |
| B5 | Vert-Galant | 4 |
| B5 | Sevran–Livry | 4 |
| Main | Aulnay-sous-Bois | 4 |
| Main | Le Blanc-Mesnil | 3 |
| Main | Drancy | 3 |
| Main | Le Bourget | 3 |
| Main | La Courneuve–Aubervilliers | 3 |
| Main | La Plaine–Stade de France Saint-Denis - Aubervilliers | 2 |
| Main | Paris-Gare du Nord | 1 |
| Main | Châtelet–Les Halles | 1 |
| Main | Saint-Michel–Notre-Dame | 1 |
| Main | Luxembourg Sénat | 1 |
| Main | Port-Royal | 1 |
| Main | Denfert-Rochereau Colonel Rol-Tanguy | 1 |
| Main | Cité Universitaire | 1 |
| Main | Gentilly | 2 |
| Main | Laplace Maison des Examens | 2 |
| Main | Arcueil–Cachan | 3 |
| Main | Bagneux Pont Royal | 3 |
| Main | Bourg-la-Reine | 3 |
| B2 | Sceaux | 3 |
| B2 | Fontenay-aux-Roses | 3 |
| B2 | Robinson | 3 |
| B4 | Parc de Sceaux | 3 |
| B4 | La Croix de Berny | 3 |
| B4 | Antony | 3 |
| B4 | Fontaine-Michalon | 4 |
| B4 | Les Baconnets | 4 |
| B4 | Massy–Verrières | 4 |
| B4 | Massy–Palaiseau | 4 |
| B4 | Palaiseau | 4 |
| B4 | Palaiseau–Villebon | 4 |
| B4 | Lozère École polytechnique | 4 |
| B4 | Le Guichet | 5 |
| B4 | Orsay-Ville | 5 |
| B4 | Bures-sur-Yvette | 5 |
| B4 | La Hacquinière | 5 |
| B4 | Gif-sur-Yvette | 5 |
| B4 | Courcelle-sur-Yvette | 5 |
| B4 | Saint-Rémy-lès-Chevreuse | 5 |

== Service patterns ==
The RER B Line has two service patterns:

- Off-peak hours on weekdays, Saturdays and Sundays
- Rush hour during the week (and special events such as matches at the Stade de France or construction work)

In any case, the stations from Cité Universitaire to Paris Gare du Nord are served by every single train.

=== Off-peak service ===
In 2021, the off-peak service is made up of 3 missions per 1 / 4H:

To the south:

- Mission K, (KALI, KARE, etc.) for Massy–Palaiseau (Massy)
  - Non-stop train between CDG and Paris, then local train from Paris to Massy
- Mission S, (SVAN, SOLO, etc.) for Robinson
  - Local train on the entire line between Mitry—Claye and Robinson
- Mission P, (PEPE, PILE, etc.) for St Remy-lès-Chevreuse
  - Local train between CDG and Paris, rapid/semi-direct train between Paris and Massy–Palaiseau, then local train to St Remy

To the north:

- Mission E, (EKLI, ELAN, etc.) for CDG2
  - Local train in the south between Massy and Paris, then non-stop/direct train between Paris and CDG2
- Mission E, (EFLA, ERGE, etc.) for CDG2
  - Local train between St Remy and Massy, rapid/semi-direct train between Massy and Paris, then local train from Paris to CDG
- Mission I, (IBIS, IMRE, etc.) for Mitry-Mory
  - Local train on the whole line

=== Rush hour service ===
Rush hour is between 07:00 and 09:45 in the morning and between 16:00 and 20:00 in the afternoon.

In 2021 the rush hour service is made up of 4 missions per 1 / 4H:

==== General scheme ====
In the northern section after Paris Gare du Nord, all trains are local trains.

To the south:

- Mission K, (KALI, KARE, etc ...) for Massy–Palaiseau (Massy)
  - Rapid train from Paris to Massy
- Mission L, (LUNE, LEVE, etc ...) for Orsay
  - Rapid train from Paris to Massy then local train between Massy and Orsay
- Mission S, (SVAN, SOLO, etc ...) for Robinson
  - Local train until Robinson
- Mission P, (PEPE, PILE, etc ...) for St Remy-lès-Chevreuse
  - Semi-direct train between Paris and Massy–Palaiseau, non-stop train between Massy and Orsay, then local train between Orsay and St Remy

To the north:

In the northern section after Paris Gare du Nord, all trains are local trains.

- 2 Mission E to Roissy
- 2 Mission I to Mitry Mory

Some infrequent missions can be seen such as missions J to Denfert Rochereau in the evening.

=== Mission code ===
RER B mission codes are made up of four letters followed by two numbers. The first letter always indicates the destination.

Meaning of first letter used regularly
| Letter | Destination |
|---|---|
| E | Aéroport Charles-de-Gaulle 2 TGV |
| I | Mitry - Claye |
| J | Denfert-Rochereau |
| K | Massy - Palaiseau |
| L | Orsay-Ville |
| P | Saint-Rémy-lès-Chevreuse |
| Q | La Plaine - Stade de France |
| S | Robinson |
| U | Laplace |

Meaning of first letter used exceptionally
| Letter | Destination |
|---|---|
| A | Gare du Nord |
| G | Aulnay-sous-Bois |
| H | Bourg-la-Reine |
| M | Châtelet - Les Halles |
| V | Lozère |
| X | Parc des Expositions |
| Y | Les Baconnets |

== Rolling stock ==
RER B is operated by 117 sets of the MI 79 series and 31 sets of the MI 84 series. These are to be replaced from 2028 by the MI 20 series.

Past fleet include the MS 61, which operated on the line from 29 June 1967 to 28 February 1983, and the Class Z 23000, which operated from 16 November 1937 to 27 February 1987.

== Future ==
=== Aérofret infill station ===
As part of the Grand Paris public works programme, the creation of a new infill station called Aérofret between Parc des Expositions station to the south and Aéroport Charles de Gaulle 1 station to the north was proposed. The new station would be located adjacent to and serve the Aéroville mall as well as planned development on the western side of the freight areas on the western side of Charles de Gaulle Airport. It is slated to open at a date to be announced along with the planned developments in the area.

=== Northeastern extension of the Mitry–Claye branch to the Dammartin-en-Goële area ===
Already proposed in the 1994 Schéma directeur de la région Île-de-France (Île-de-France regional development plan, SDRIF), but without any concrete plans ten years later, the project to extend RER B northeast from Mitry–Claye station to the Dammartin-en-Goële area, serving intermediate stations at Compans and Thieux-Nantouillet, is proposed in Phase 3 (horizon 2021-2027) of the revised SDRIF, adopted by deliberation of the Regional Council of Île-de-France on September 25, 2008. It would also involve the creation of a new terminus station located in the neighbouring commune of Rouvres, some 3.5 km (2.2 mi) north of the current Dammartin Juilly Saint-Mard station near Saint-Mard, which is old and unsuitable for such a project. The project is now expected to be completed around 2030.

== See also ==
- List of stations of the Paris Métro
- List of stations of the Paris RER
