= Musée de Minéralogie =

Museum of mineralogy in Paris, France

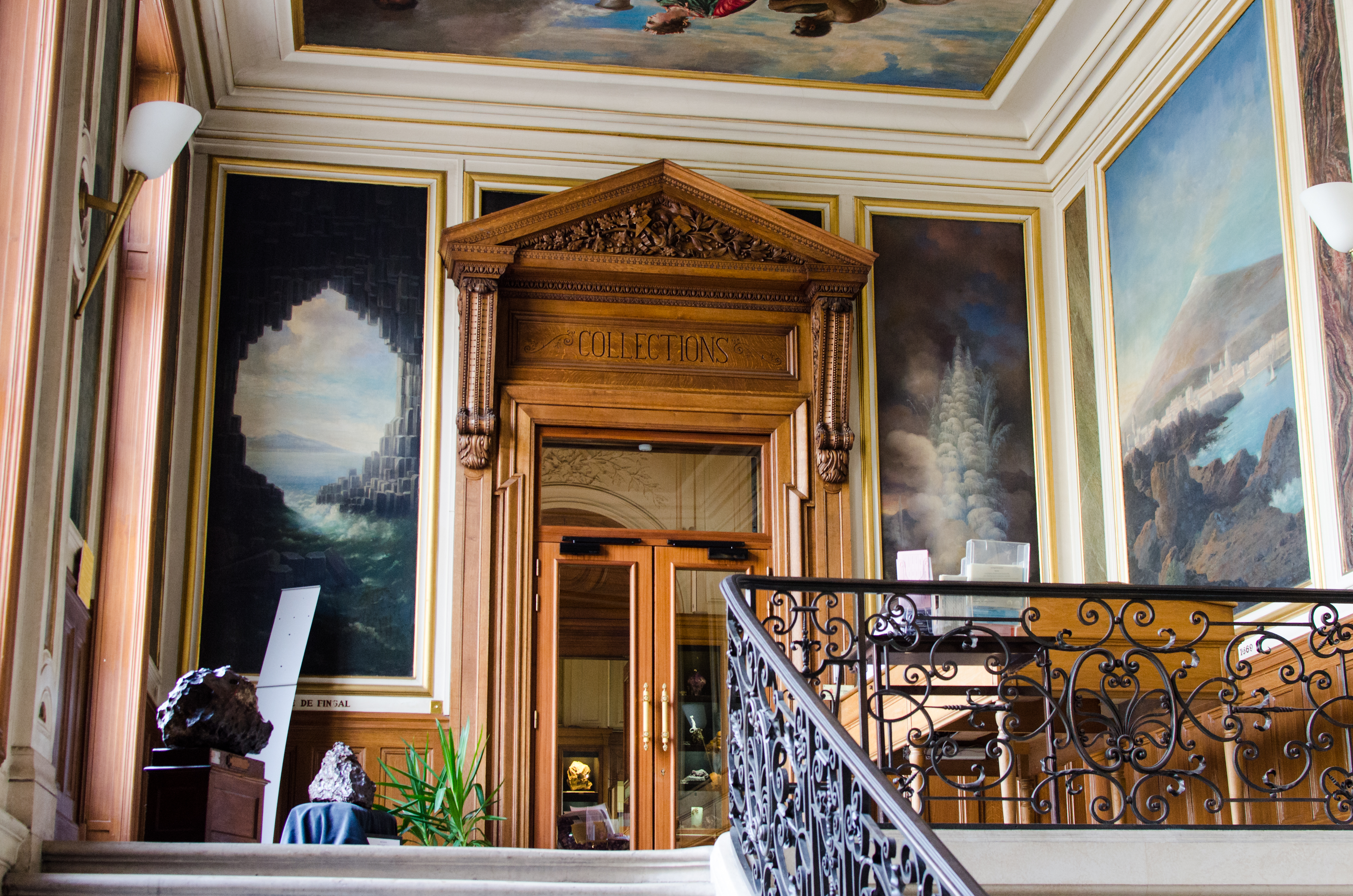
- Established: 1794
- Location: 60 Boulevard Saint-Michel, 75006 Paris
- Coordinates: 48.845687°N 2.339762°E
- Type: Mineralogy museum
- Curator: Mines Paris – PSL
- Public transit access: Luxembourg station (Paris)
- Website: https://www.musee.minesparis.psl.eu

The Musée de Minéralogie (French pronunciation: [myze də mineʁalɔʒi]) is a museum of mineralogy operated by the École nationale supérieure des mines de Paris (Mines Paris). It is located inside the building of Mines Paris in the 6th arrondissement at 60, boulevard Saint Michel, Paris, France. It is open daily except Sunday, Monday, and French national holidays; an admission fee is charged.

== History ==
Mines Paris was originally established in 1783, then closed in 1791 and re-established again in 1794. The museum was established in 1794, in the Hôtel de Mouchy, a former aristocratic mansion in Paris. Its head René Just Haüy described it as a Cabinet of Mineralogy "containing all production in the world and all productions of the Republic, arranged by locality." It was quickly augmented by private collections, sometimes seized by the state. Many fine additions were made in short order, and by 1814, the museum contained about 100,000 samples at the Hôtel de Mouchy. During the 19th century and early 20th century, it continued to acquire high-quality collections from around the world, interrupted for several decades starting with World War II, but then resuming.

== Collections ==
Today the museum is described as one of the ten largest mineral collections in the world, containing some 100,000 samples including 80,000 minerals, 15,000 rocks, 4,000 ores, 400 meteorites, 700 gems, and 300 artificial crystals.

== Exhibitions ==
- 2023: Collectible Minerals
- 2024: Romance in the stone
- 2025: Minerals in Minecraft

== See also ==
- List of museums in Paris
