= Renault VH =

Renault Diesel railcar

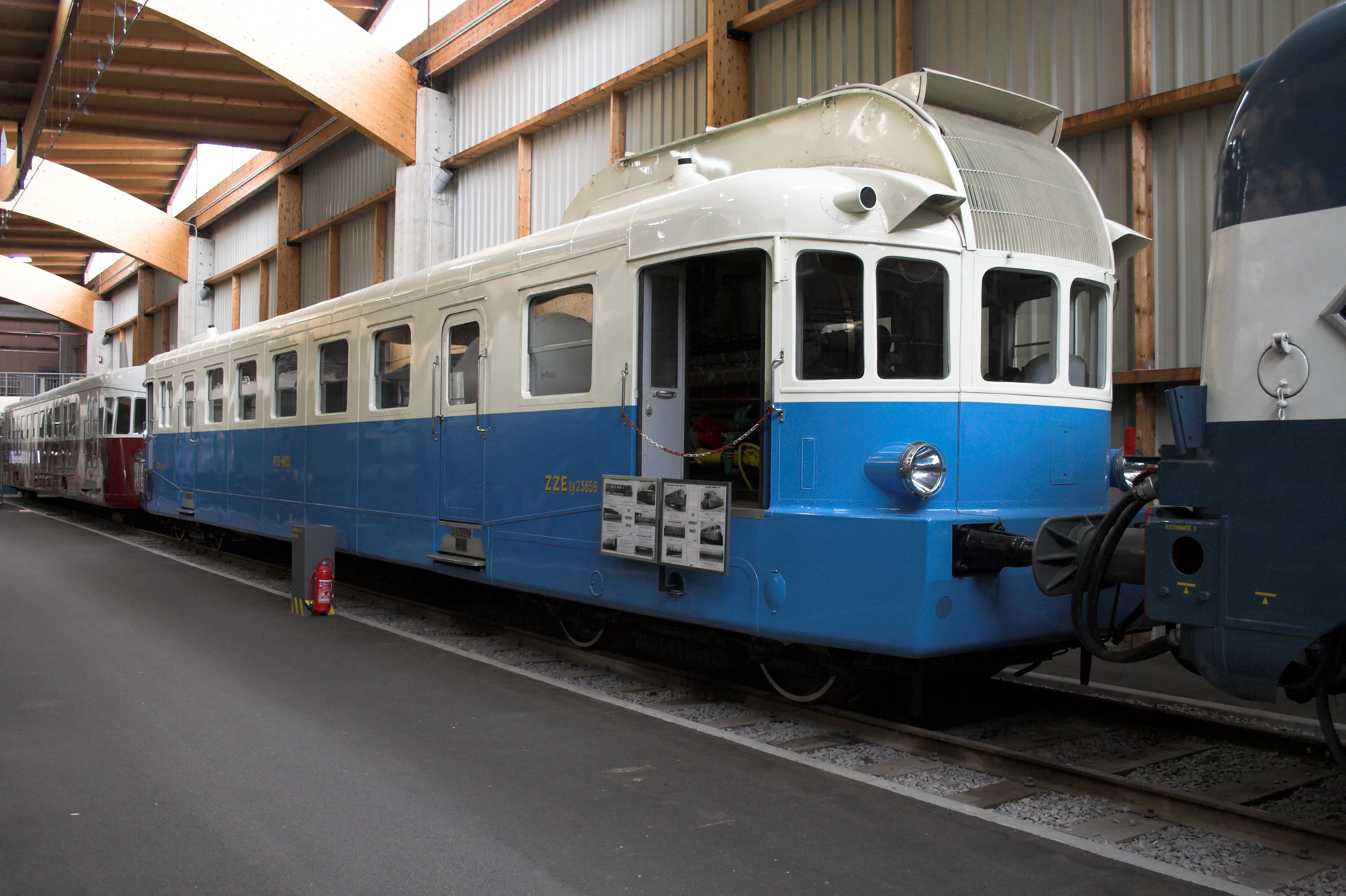
- Unit VH2211 on display in Cite du train.
- In service: 1933-1935
- Manufacturer: Renault
- Built at: Île Seguin
- Constructed: 1933-1935
- Entered service: 1933-1970
- Refurbished: circa 1945-1950
- Number built: 100
- Number preserved: 2
- Number scrapped: 98
- Fleet numbers: with SNCF, X 2001 to X 2336
- Capacity: variable, 47 to 70 seats according to configuration
- Operators: SNCF
- Depots: région Est : dépôt de Vesoul; région Ouest : dépôts de Batignolles-Remblai, Lisieux, Granville, Le Mans, Nantes-Blottereau, La Rochelle et Niort; région Sud-Ouest : dépôts de Poitiers, Montluçon, Carcassonne, Toulouse, Agen, Mont-de-Marsan et Aurillac; région Sud-Est : dépôts de Lyon-Vaise et Clermont-Ferrand; région Méditerranée : dépôts d'Avignon et Toulon.

Specifications
- Train length: 20.40 / 21.04 m (66 ft 11 in / 69 ft 0 in)
- Doors: 2 lateral doors
- Maximum speed: 100 km/h (62 mph)
- Weight: 27.4 t (60,400 lb)
- Prime mover(s): Renault V12
- HVAC: no
- Bogies: 2, one powered
- Track gauge: 1,435 mm (4 ft 8 1/2 in)

Renault VH is the first standard-gauge railcar produced by Renault in large numbers, starting in 1933. One hundred units were manufactured in the Ile Seguin factories near Paris. The units ran on various SNCF lines until 1970. Two examples have been preserved; one at Cité du Train, the other at Train à vapeur des Cévennes (CITEV).

== Construction History ==
From 1922 to 1932, Renault built several types of railcars, either one-offs or in very limited series. This allowed the company to test various technical options, notably diesel propulsion.

By 1933, the company had perfected the basic design for a railcar, the Type VH, building 15 units at the Ile Seguin factory. These fifteen railcars were made available to various French railways. The networks of Alsace-Lorraine, the P.O., the PLM, the Compagnie de l’Est and the Chemins de fer de l'État used these railcars, which were delivered between March and December 1933.

This first delivery led to an order for 85 additional units from these same railways, in addition to orders from the Chemins de Fer du Nord and the Compagnie des chemins de fer secondaires du Nord-Est (CFNSE). The units from this second order were delivered from 1934 to June 1935.

These units (except for those of the CNFSE) were transferred between the various railways until they were eventually absorbed into the SNCF in 1938.

== Technical Details ==
The VH are equipped with the Renault 12-A-130 engine with twelve V-cylinders (27 liters of overall displacement), producing 220 hp. This engine sends power via a clutch to a four-speed gearbox equipped with an inverter. The power is transmitted to the two axles of the driving bogie by a universal joint. All controls are manual. The engine is cooled by a voluminous streamlined radiator on the roof equipped with an adjustable flap (earning the VH their nickname "Iroquois" as it resembled the traditional head dress worn by Native Americans). As built, the units came with buffers and Willison couplers.

The large roof-mounted radiator was used to cool the Renault 12-A-130 engine, which was located in one of the control cabs in the unit. Another other control cab was located in the baggage compartment at the opposite end of the VH. Drivers preferred the much quieter, less odorous and cooler control cab in the baggage compartment.

During the Second World War, the units sat idle due to a lack of fuel (as did most other railcars). In spite of precautions taken by the SNCF to park them in safe locations, nine VH units were badly damaged and retired from 1944 to 1950. The remainder underwent extensive updating and modifications, adding sleepers, simplified couplers, multiple unit controls, more powerful Type 517 engines producing 300 hp, updated heating systems, new paint schemes and unified headlights, before being able to return to service.

=== Interiors and Paint Schemes ===
The updated VH interiors were quite different from as-delivered condition, owing to the different railroads from which they came and to the service in which they would be used. The renovations include updates to the various passenger compartments (individual third class, first and second class or second and third class), the number of seats (with the addition of folding seats), the addition of washrooms and a new postal compartment. The renovations also include a baggage compartment. The passenger areas were heated by circulating exhaust gases in pipes running along the compartments.

Interior layouts of the VH units were redone after the formation of the SNCF; they were not consistent from one unit to the next. The exhaust gas heating system presented an asphyxiation risk to passengers or a fire hazard if it malfunctioned and was replaced in all VH units with radiators using cooling water from the engines.

When delivered, the VH units were painted according to the wishes of their proprietor railroad; they were all repainted after being taken over by the SNCF. They were first painted red, then red and grey and finally red and cream. The 1968 decision by the railway to repaint all railcars a vermilion red for easier visibility didn't apply to the VH units, then near retirement.

== Numbering System ==
When delivered, the VH units had specific numbers for each railroad, starting with ZZ then one or two letters specifying the railway, then a number with one to five digits. Starting January 1, 1939, the SNCF standardized the numbering of the units: ZZR (“R” for Renault) and a four digit number in the 2200, 2100, 2200 or 2300 series. In 1949 the “ZZR” was replaced by an “X”, the other digits and series numbers remaining the same.

== Preservation ==
Two units have been preserved. X 2211, former ZZy 24056 of the State network then transferred to the P.O.-Midi, joined the Cité du train in Mulhouse in 1978. It is displayed in its original blue and gray livery.

The CFSNE VH 24, withdrawn from service around 1971, was bought by CITEV in 1979 after having been stored for several years. Restored in 2003 in its original garnet livery, it runs on the Anduze - Saint-Jean-du-Gard line.
