= Ligne de Sceaux =

Railway line in France

Sceaux Line
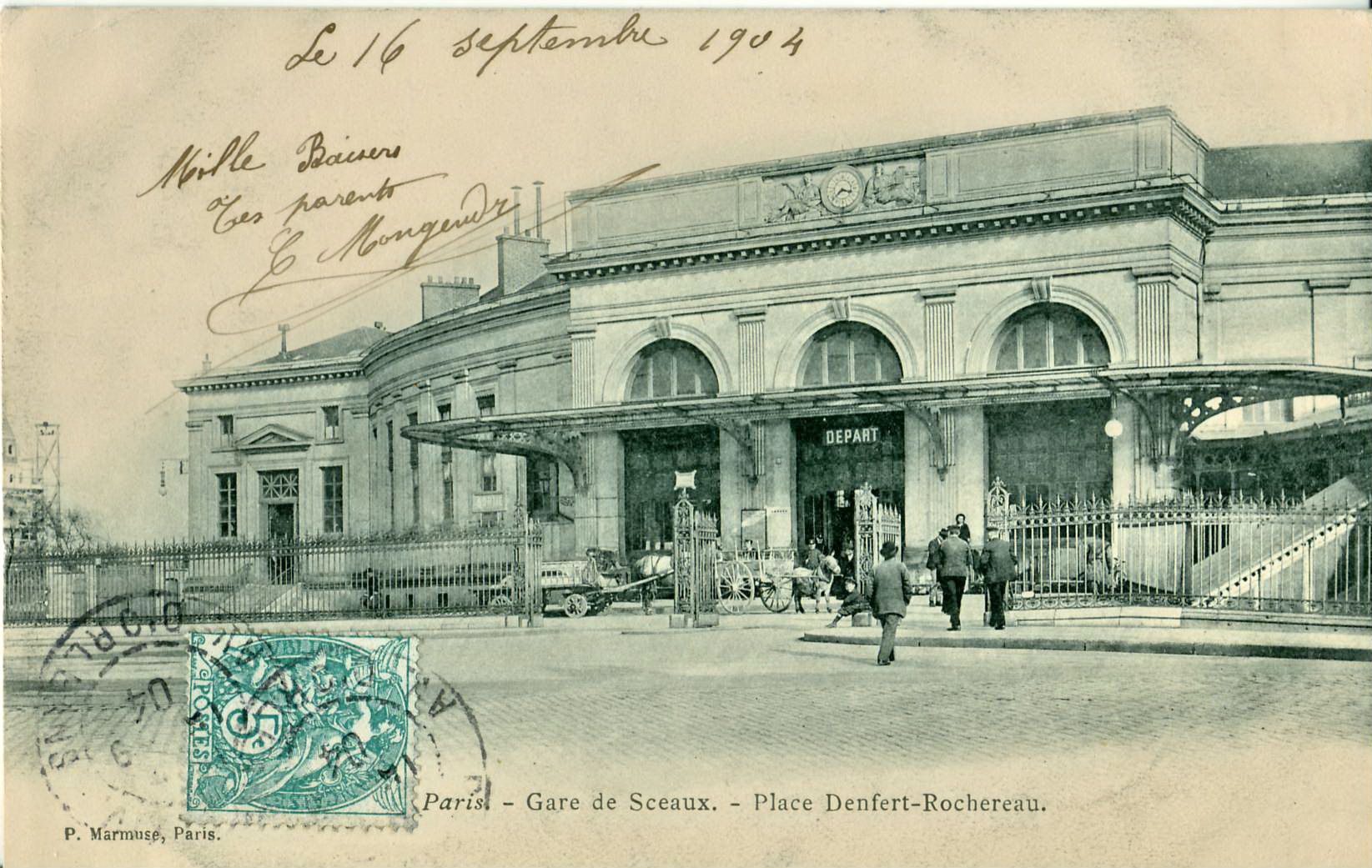
- The station at Place Denfert-Rochereau, at the time when it was the terminus of the line. Designed in the days of the broad-gauge track of the Arnoux system, the curved shape of the buildings allowed trains to serve the terminus by turning along the interior façade.

Overview
- Native name: French
- Owner: Cie Paris à Sceaux (1844–1857); Cie du P.O. (1857–1929); CMP, later RATP (since 1929)
- Locale: Southern suburbs of Paris
- Termini: Paris; Limours, Sceaux

Service
- Operator(s): RATP

History
- Opened: 1846–1867

Technical
- Number of tracks: 2
- Track gauge: 1,435 mm (4 ft 8 1/2 in) standard gauge
- Old gauge: 1,750 mm (5 ft 8 7/8 in) (standardised in 1893)
- Electrification: 1500 V DC

The Ligne de Sceaux (French pronunciation: [liɲ də so], Sceaux Line) was a railway line in France running from Paris, which initially linked the Place Denfert-Rochereau (then called the Place d'Enfer, in Paris, to the town of Sceaux.

The line originally opened in 1846 as a broad gauge line to demonstrate the Arnoux system and was extended to the south to Sceaux. A branch, now the main line, was built to Orsay and extended to Saint-Rémy-lès-Chevreuse and then to Limours. In the latter configuration, it is also called the Paris-Luxembourg–Limours line (line 552000 of the national rail network) by SNCF Réseau.

With a capital of 3 million francs, it was one of five companies placed under sequestration by the State during the Crash of 1847, along with the Compagnie du chemin de fer de Paris à Orléans on 4 April 1848, the Compagnie du chemin de fer de Bordeaux à La Teste on 30 October 1848 and the Compagnie du chemin de fer de Marseille à Avignon on 21 November 1848. Similarly, the Compagnie du chemin de fer de Paris à Lyon was nationalised in 1848.

In 1895, it was extended north into Paris to Luxembourg station. In 1937, it was transferred by the Compagnie du chemin de fer de Paris à Orléans to the Compagnie du chemin de fer métropolitain de Paris (CMP) after thorough modernisation. The commissioning of electric railcars suitable for the line, the Z railcars, and the redevelopment of the infrastructure with high platforms and high-performance signalling made it a core section of a future regional metro, enabling it to double its traffic in less than a year. The section from Saint-Rémy-lès-Chevreuse to Limours was abandoned in 1939.

After a period of particularly high traffic during the Second World War and the following years, the 40 km (25 mi) long line was integrated into the Réseau Express Régional (Regional Express Network, RER) in 1977. It now constitutes the two southern branches of line B of the RER south of the Gare du Nord: branch B2 to Robinson and branch B4 to Saint-Rémy-lès-Chevreuse.

== Construction of the line ==
=== Paris to Sceaux ===
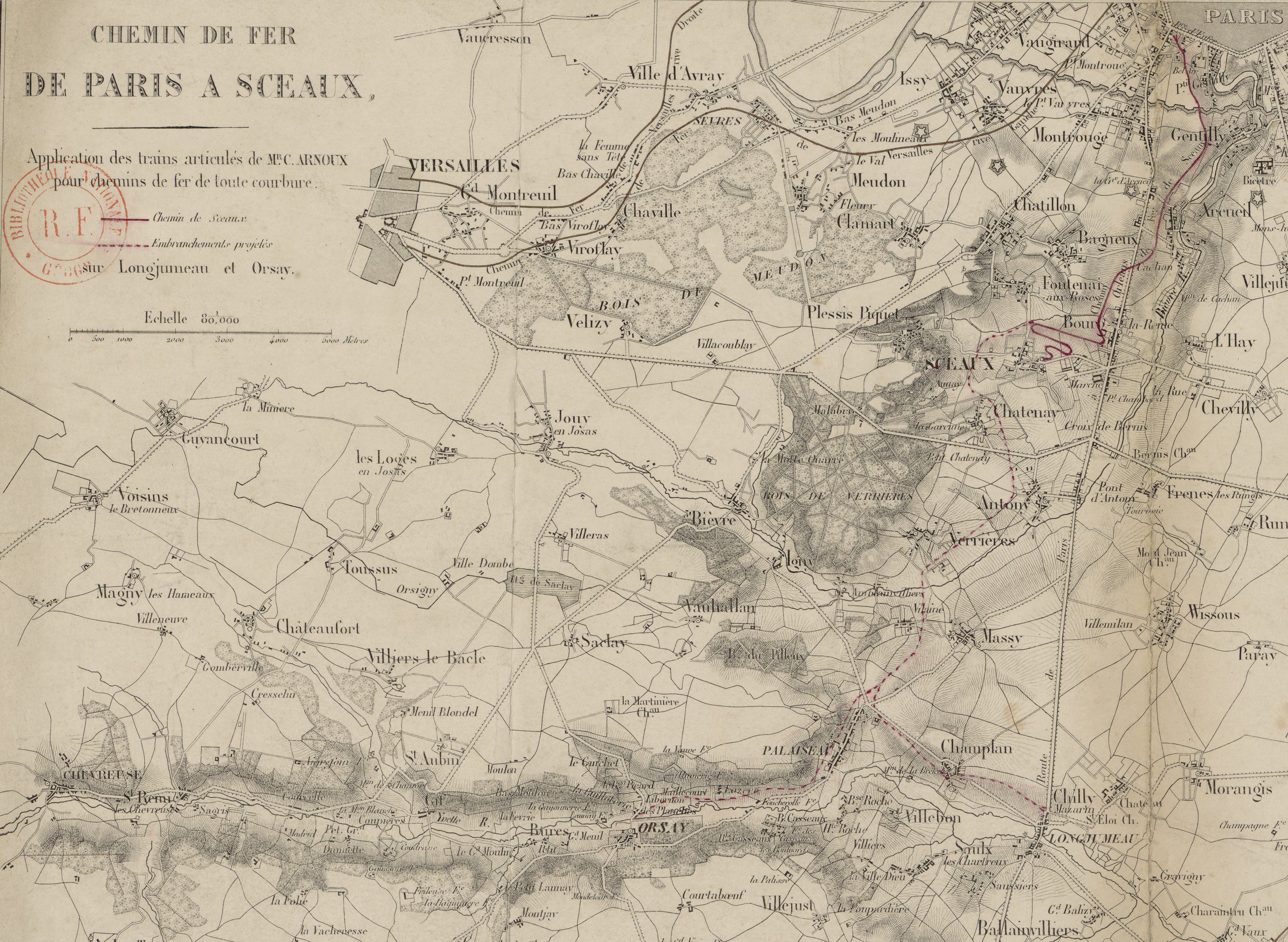
Map of the railway from Paris to Sceaux showing: • in solid lines, the route to Sceaux; • in dashed lines, the branches planned towards Orsay, on one hand, and towards Longjumeau, on the other.

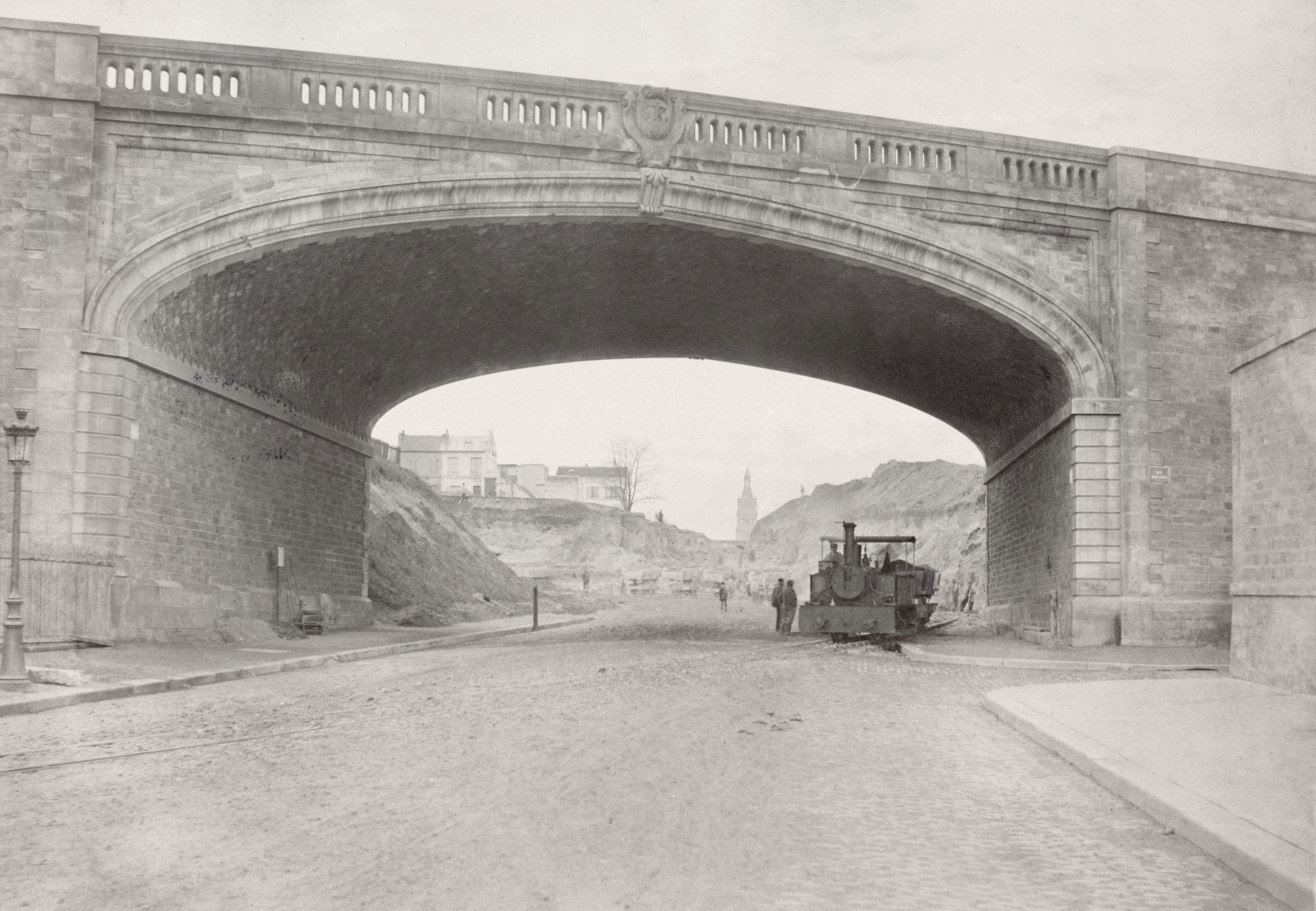
Bridge for the crossing over the Rue d'Alésia, about 1860.

In 1838, Jean-Claude-Républicain Arnoux, a graduate of the École polytechnique, proposed a technical solution to improve the speed of trains in curves, while reducing wear on the rails and wheels. He suggested separating the wheels from the same axle and hinging the axles on a central pivot instead of fixing them to the carriage frames. In addition, he recommended the use of a broad gauge of 1,750 mm (5 ft 8 7/8 in). This is called the Arnoux system (système Arnoux).

In order to implement his system, Arnoux secured the adoption of a law on 5 August 1844 that granted him a concession to build and operate the Sceaux line for a period of fifty years. On 21 February 1845, he founded the Compagnie du Chemin de fer de Paris à Sceaux (Paris–Sceaux Railway Company). The first section connected the embarcadère (pier) of Enfer (renamed Denfert-Rochereau in 1895), located at the Barrière d'Enfer in Paris, to Sceaux. It was inaugurated on 7 June 1846 and opened to the public on 23 June.

This first section, which wound around several sharp curves and reverse curves from Bourg-la-Reine to enable a gradient of 1.15% and passed through an intermediate station called Fontenay (named after the street of Rue de Fontenay in Sceaux), had its terminus at Sceaux. The winding route was intended to prove the relevance and effectiveness of the Arnoux system. The gradient of the track did not exceed 3.0%. Although the structures were planned from the start to enable a double track, only a single track was laid for the opening. A second track was laid from Paris to Bourg-la-Reine in 1863.

=== Bourg-la-Reine to Orsay ===
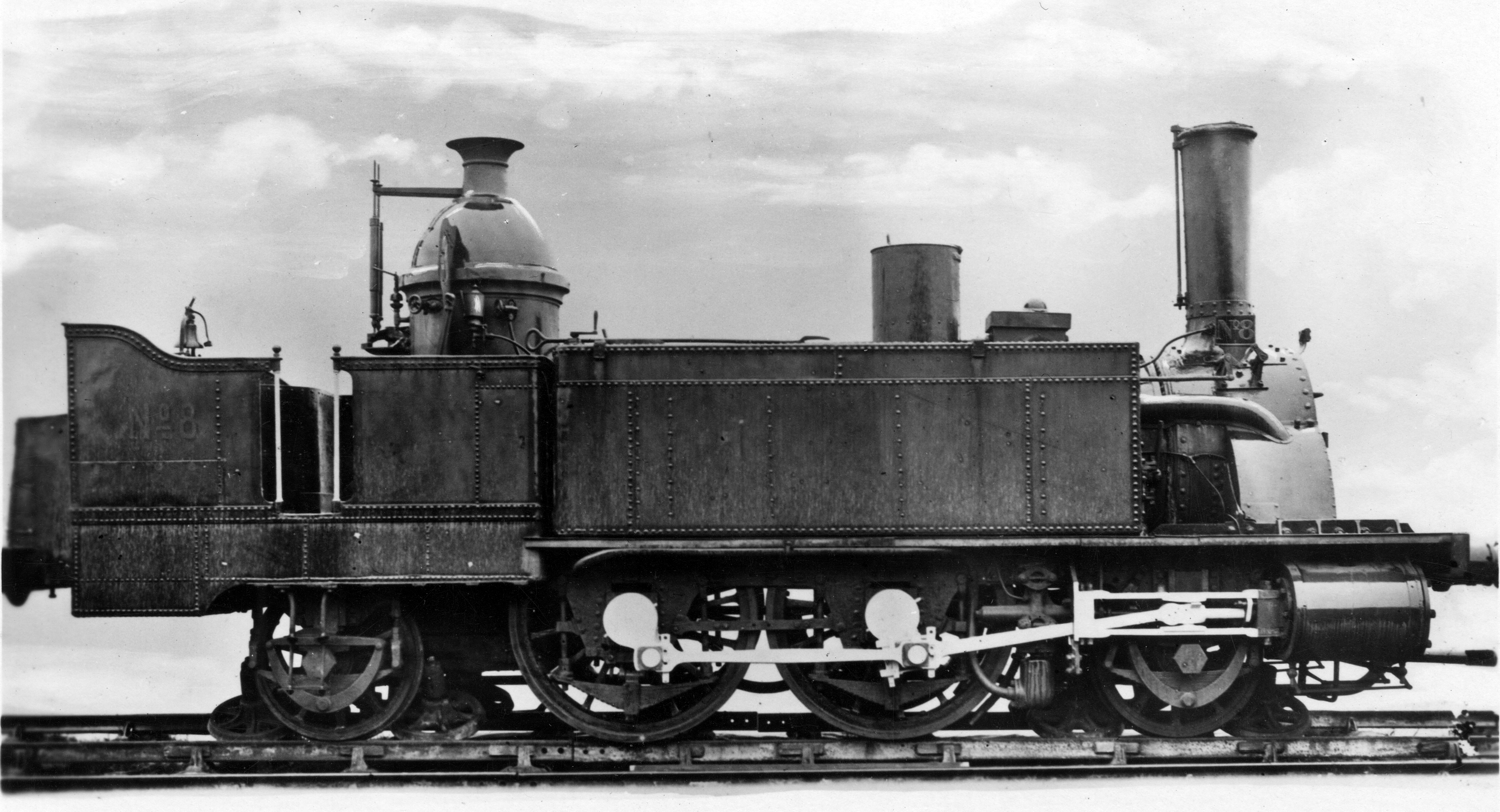
Anjubault locomotive, 1,675 mm (1,750 mm?) broad gauge from the Sceaux line, modified in 1867 to become no. 8 PO

The line suffered from losses during its operations: while very profitable during fine weather, it struggled to attract travellers during the rest of the year. The company considered an extension to Orsay to improve its profitability. The first route considered would have branched off near Fontenay station and would have included a branch towards Longjumeau. This first proposal was not pursued, but the current route, with a branch at Bourg-la-Reine, was seriously studied.

However, the financial crisis of 1847 further weakened the company, so that it was placed in receivership in 1849–1850. During the Revolution of 1848, earthworks were built from Sceaux to Orsay, financed by the State within the framework of the National Workshops. They reached Palaiseau in 1849. The State, wary of the company's future, built the platforms to conventional railway standards, that is to say with radii of curvature grrater than the sharp curves accepted by the Arnoux system.

The company, partially refloated, obtains a concession to build a line from Bourg-la-Reine to Orsay by a law of 10 June 1853. In addition to passenger traffic, significant freight traffic was forecast, notably the transport of sandstone from the Yvette valley and fresh vegetables.

The line was single track, broad gauge, although the concession provides for its conversion to standard gauge in the long term. The line comprised 17 structures, including a 205-metre (673 ft)-long tunnel. Between Palaiseau and Orsay, the line was also sinuous, unlike the section built by the state: the radii of curvature were as little as 125 m (410 ft).

The section was inaugurated to Orsay on 28 July 1854. The terminus was at a place called "les Planches", near the current Guichet.

Despite some signs of financial improvement, the company remained fragile, and in particular could not acquire the rolling stock for the establishment of a freight service, which would nevertheless have been lucrative.

=== Orsay to Limours ===
The Compagnie du Paris-Orléans bought the Sceaux line from the Arnoux company in 1857 to thwart the plans of a competing company that wanted to gain rail access to Paris. In the project presented, the Sceaux line was to be integrated into a route from Paris to Tours through Châteaudun and Vendôme. However, once this competitor had been eliminated and in-depth studies carried out, the Paris-Orléans determined that the beginning of the line to Tours via Orsay was impractical due to a succession of plateaus and valleys. The Paris-Orléans gained approval for a new route via Brétigny. Following the financial collapse of the Compagnie du chemin de fer Grand-Central de France and its dismantling organised by the State in 1857 for the benefit of the Compagnie du chemin de fer de Paris à Orléans and the establishment of the Compagnie des chemins de fer de Paris à Lyon et à la Méditerranée, the Compagnie du chemin de fer de Paris à Orléans bought the line from Paris to Orsay under an agreement signed between the two companies on 18 June 1855. This treaty was approved by decree on 19 June 1857.

As compensation for a population that was to be deprived of a railway, it was proposed to build a section from Orsay to Limours as an extension of the Sceaux line. A decree of August 28, 1862 ratified this extension to Limours, via Saint-Rémy-lès-Chevreuse and the valley of Saint-Paul. Thus, the Paris-Orleans was allowed to make a saving by not having to serve Chevreuse, even if it meant building a 2% ramp in the valley of Saint-Paul. The concession to build line "from Orsay to Limours" was officially granted to the Compagnie du chemin de fer de Paris à Orléans by an agreement signed on 11 June 1863 between the Minister of Public Works and the Company. This agreement was approved by an imperial decree on 6 July 1863.

The last section was inaugurated on 26 August 1867. It was built as a single track.

== The Paris-Orléans period ==
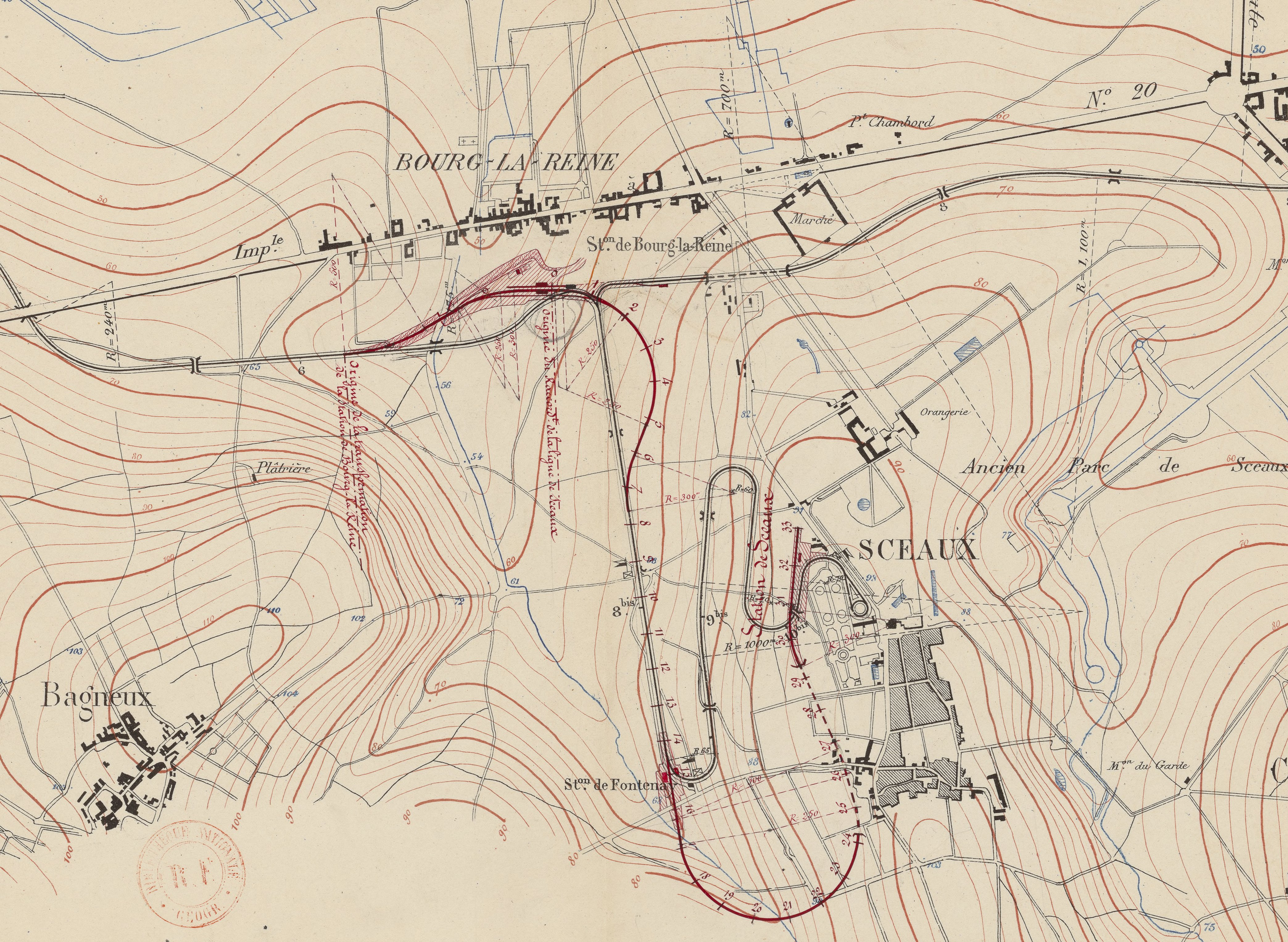
Plan of the reconstruction project between Bourg-la-Reine and Sceaux.

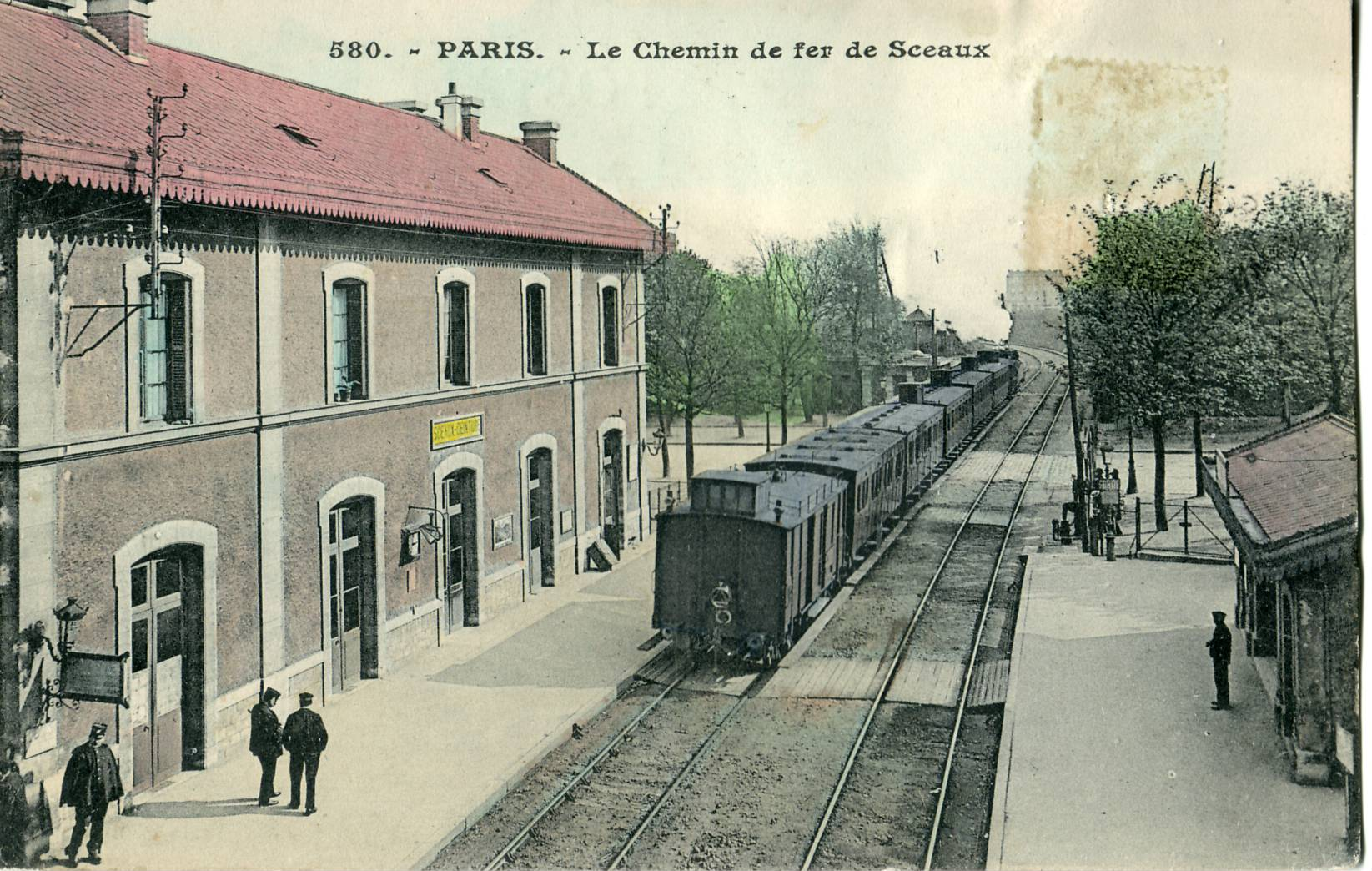
The Sceaux line at the time of the Compagnie du chemin de fer de Paris à Orléans (PO).

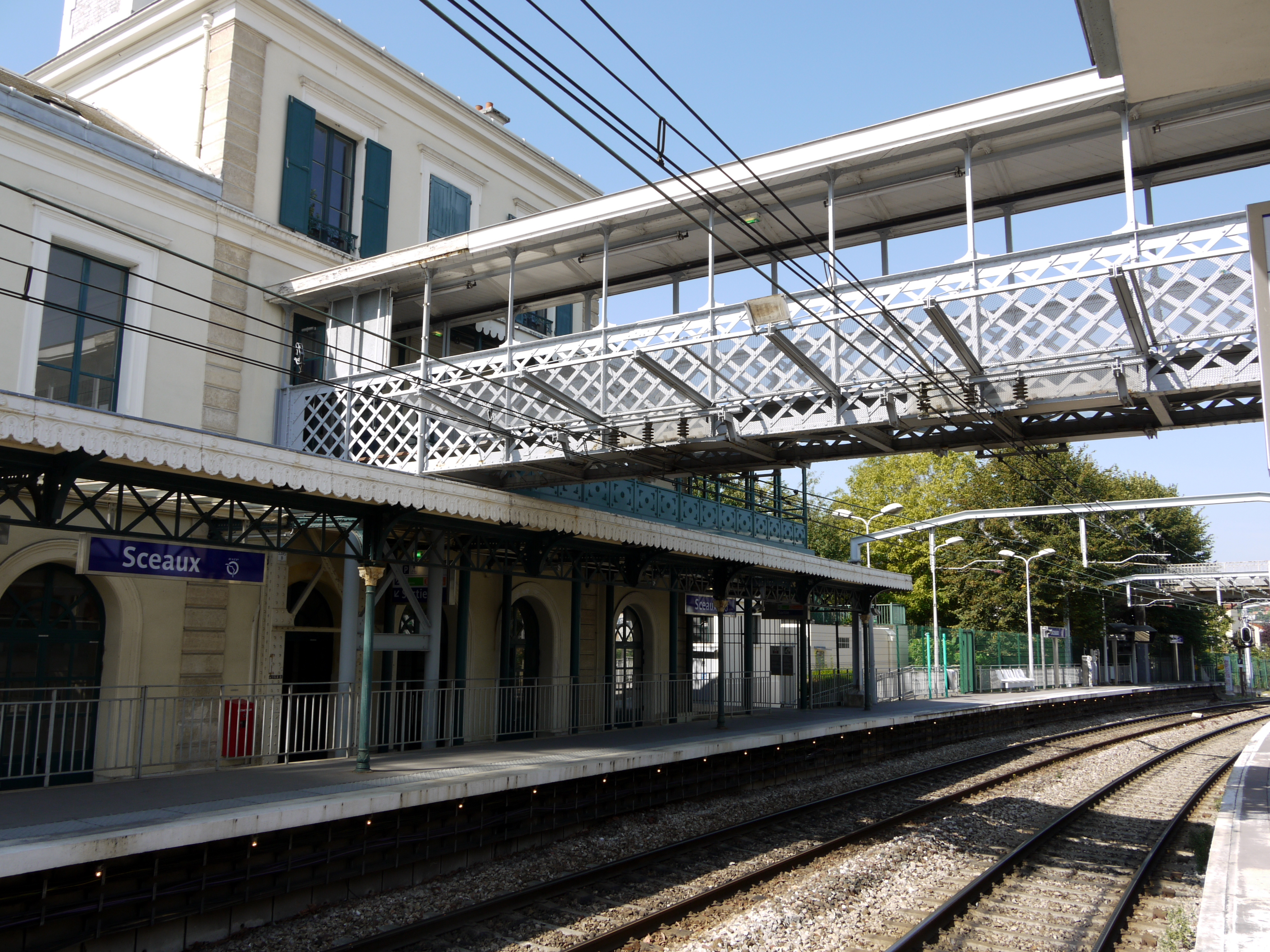
The new Sceaux station created on the route inaugurated in 1893.

=== Acquisition and modernisation ===
Towards the end of the 19th century, the emergence of bogies overcame the problem of wear on rails and restrictions on speed through curves without resorting to the complex system, including broad gauge, designed by Arnoux. To make the Sceaux line compatible with other networks, a decree of 1889 permitted the Arnoux system to be abandoned and 1,435 mm (4 ft 8 1/2 in) standard gauge adopted.

In order not to interrupt the traffic, the conversion of gauge and change of rolling stock was carried out on the night of 21/22 May 1891. The original route from Bourg-la-Reine to Sceaux was abandoned and replaced by the current route, which also comprises three stations and ends in Robinson, passing through Fontenay-aux-Roses. Work began in June 1891 and ended in May 1893.

=== Extension to Luxembourg ===
The extension in Paris between Denfert station and Luxembourg was declared to be of public utility by a decree of 14 December 1889. In the 1890s, the line was extended in tunnel to a new Parisian terminus at Luxembourg. Vents were provided for the extraction of the steam locomotives' fumes.

The Compagnie du Paris-Orléans also planned to move this terminus to its new Orsay station (later converted to house the Musée d'Orsay), opened in 1900. The beginning of this extension still exists at the east exit of RER C from the station in the form of a second double-track running tunnel parallel to the one heading towards the Gare d'Austerlitz. This is now used for train storage.

=== Development projects ===
A line from Limours to Dourdan was granted as a possible concession to the Compagnie du chemin de fer de Paris à Orléans by an agreement signed between the Minister of Public Works and the Company on 17 June 1892. This agreement was enacted by a law of 20 March 1893.

In 1913, the government considered that the electrification of the Sceaux line was not a priority, because the opening of the line from Paris to Chartres via Gallardon was imminent. Two of its four tracks would have been electrified, but this line was never finished. Meanwhile, the Compagnie du chemin de fer de Paris à Orléans was given a concession to extend the Sceaux line from Limours to Dourdan under an agreement signed by the Minister of Public Works and the company on 20 February 1913. This convention was approved by law on 7 July 1913, which also declared that the line had public utility. This line was never built.

As early as 1929, the Langevin plan (named after the then Minister of Public Works) included link lines in the Paris region so as to create an urban transport infrastructure on the model of the German S-Bahn. This developed into the Réseau Express Régional (RER).

As the Langevin plan involved crossing Paris underground, the operation of steam trains would have been problematic. In 1929, it was decided to electrify the line to Massy-Palaiseau. The Compagnie du Paris-Orléans refused to take on this work at its own expense. It nevertheless carried out the electrification due to its experience and then transferred the line to the Compagnie du chemin de fer métropolitain de Paris (CMP). This company became part of the future Régie autonome des transports parisiens (RATP) as a result of a merger after the Second World War with the Société des transports en commun de la région parisienne (STCRP), which managed the bus network and was entrusted with the operation of this section of the line.

The line was electrified between 1935 and 1937 and two substations were built at Paris-Montsouris and Massy-Villaine (between Massy-Verrières and Massy-Palaiseau). The first electric train carrying passengers ran on 16 November 1937. The electrification was carried out with overhead line, using the 1500 volts DC system.

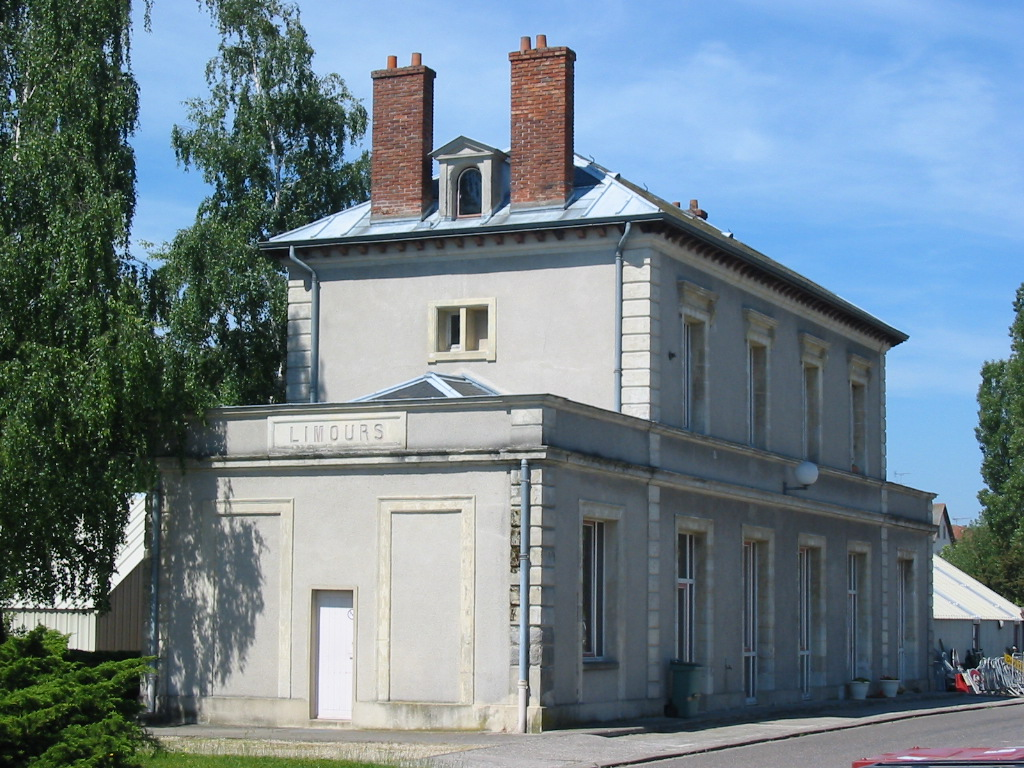
Former Limours station

Electrification continued to the south and reached Saint-Rémy-lès-Chevreuse on 1 January 1939. A new substation was installed near Gif-sur-Yvette. Electrification was never undertaken towards the town of Limours, which was always served over a single track by a Renault VH petrol railcar, operated every day from Versailles-Matelots.

The operation of the unprofitable Saint-Rémy-lès-Chevreuse – Limours section was abandoned on 15 May 1939 and replaced by a coach service.

Automatic block light signalling was installed during the electrification. The colour-light signaling adopted was original and different from that of the SNCF (Code Verlant), since turning off a light made the signal more restrictive. Thus the absolute stop signal consisted of a single red light, the forward indication of an occupied section was indicated by two red lights. A warning was given by two yellow lights and an early warning by three yellow lights. A clear section was indicated by a green light. This signalling was replaced by the standard SNCF signalling when the line was extended to Châtelet–Les Halles to connect with RER A.

== The War ==
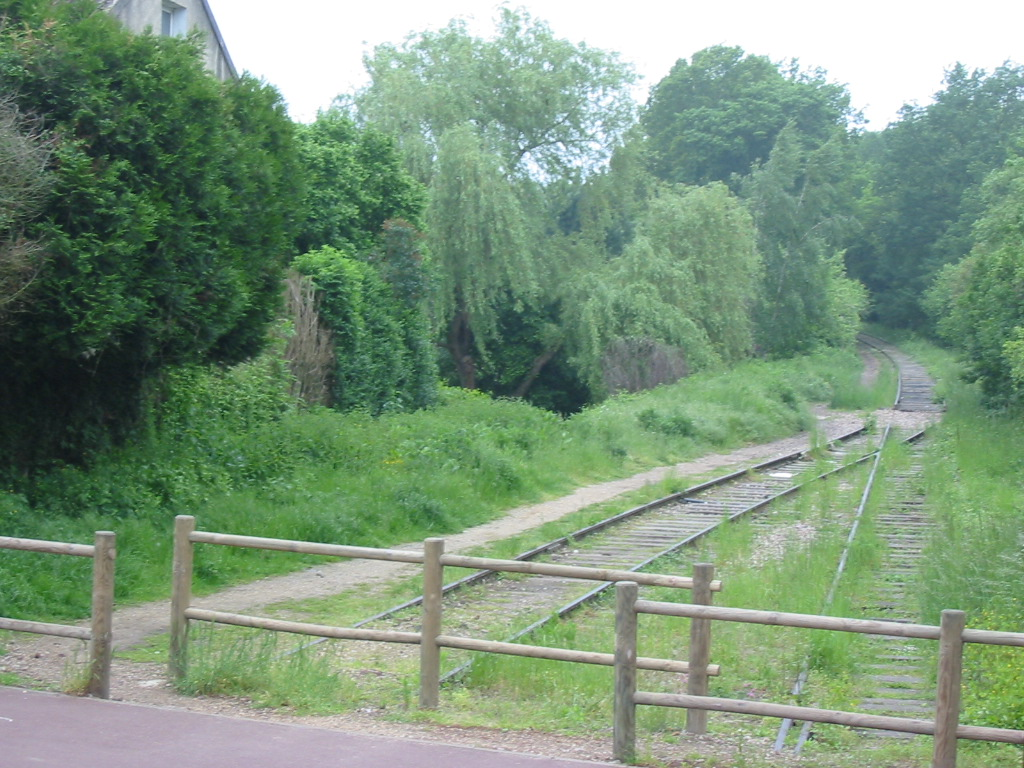
Old track towards Limours beyond Saint-Rémy-lès-Chevreuse station in 2006

The tracks of the Saint-Rémy–Limours section were torn up by the German occupiers in 1941; the ballast was used for the construction of the runways at Villacoublay airfield by allied forces in 1944. This was the end of use of the section, although it was not officially closed until 1967.

The rest of the line was spared by the war until 1944. However, Massy-Palaiseau railway junction, located on the Grande Ceinture (Great Belt), which was used by the occupying forces, was the target of four Allied air raids in June 1944. The Bures sector was the target of a fifth air raid.

== The post-war era and the RER ==
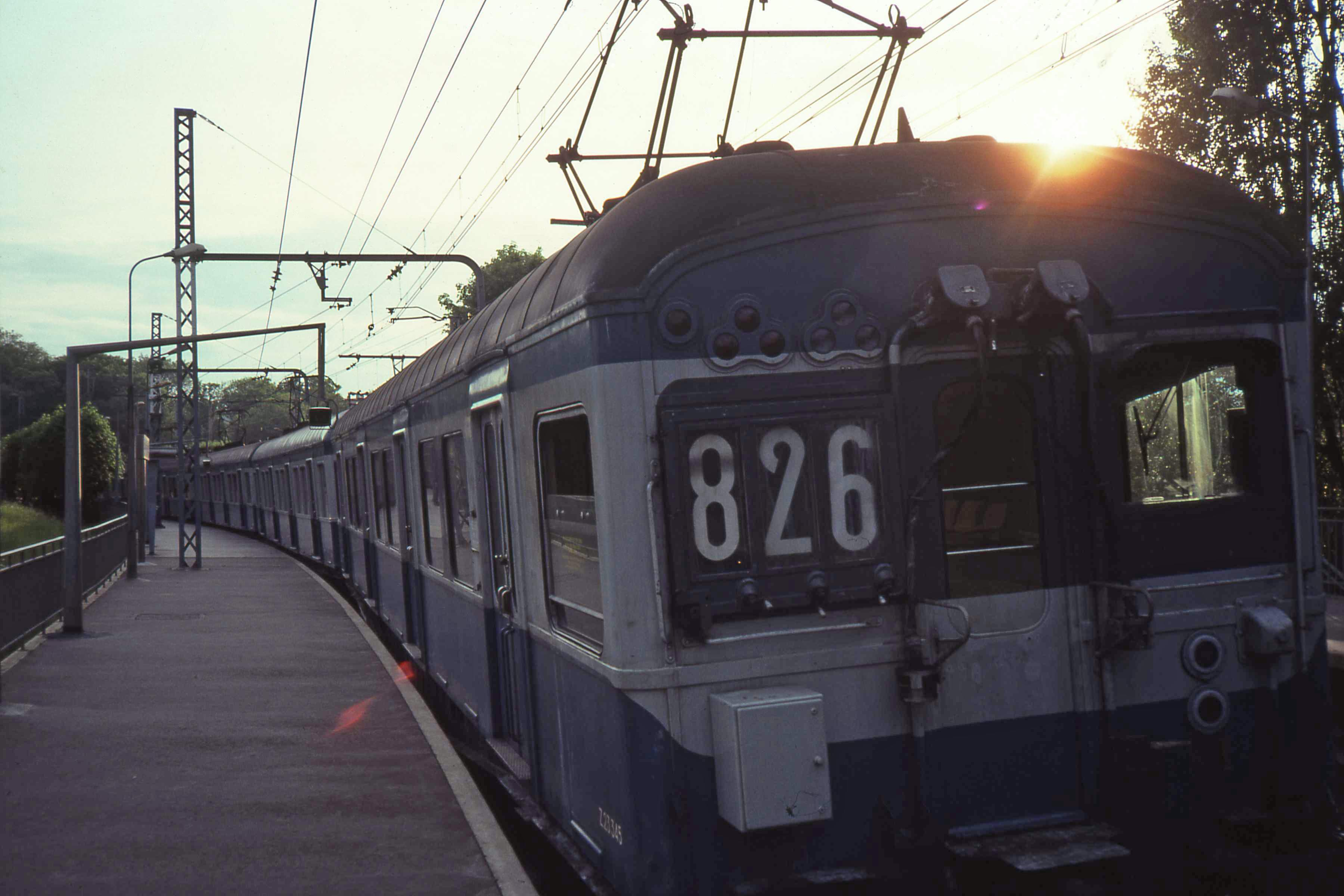
Z 23000 railcars

Newly electrified, the line was served by Z 23000 (popularly known as Z) railcars for fifty years. MS 61 sets, which later circulated on the RER A, also first operated on the line in 1967 and some MS 61 sets known as series A ran on the line until 1983. The last Z 23000s were withdrawn from service in 1987, not without having been of great help during the winters of 1985 and 1986, when the new MI 79 sets suffered many breakdowns due to snow.

In the 1970s, it was decided to connect the Sceaux line to the Gare du Nord and the lines of the Paris-Nord suburban network, in accordance with the "Master plan for development and town planning in the Paris region" (Schéma directeur d'aménagement et d'urbanisme de la région de Paris) of 1965.

The route involved a difficult crossing under the Seine and it was initially envisaged that Luxembourg station would be closed to allow an earlier descent to pass under the river and it would be replaced by the construction of a new station called Quartier Latin, which would have been built further north towards the Carrefour de l'Odéon to allow a connection with lines 4 and 10 of the Métro.

A protest campaign by residents led to the retention of Luxembourg station. As a result, the new tunnel was built with a 4.08% grade, beginning its descent just north of the station. This required the total reconstruction of the station and the establishment of a temporary terminus at the station, with one of the platforms being extended by means of wooden planks so that both sides of the trains had access to the platforms.

A new station at Châtelet–Les Halles, built to give interchange with line A was inaugurated on 8 December 1977. The Sceaux line now formed the southern branch of RER line B.

The connection between the Sceaux line in the south and the line to Roissy in the north (operated by the SNCF) and to Mitry–Claye was finally completed at the Gare du Nord in 1983. The RER B opened in its entirety, with direct services between Charles de Gaulle Airport or Mitry-Claye and Saint-Rémy-lès-Chevreuse or Robinson.

The four letter "mission codes" were introduced: the first letter indicates the terminus station for the service and the following letters indicate the details of the route (for instance: AILO, KNUT, POLY, LYRE, etc.)

Saint-Michel - Notre-Dame station, built to allow connection with line C of the RER and line 10 of the métro, was opened on 17 February 1988. This involved fitting out spaces reserved for it during the construction of the tunnel and the station is located partly under the Seine. At the same time Cluny - La Sorbonne station on line 10 was reopened to provide interchange with line 10.

== Current operations ==
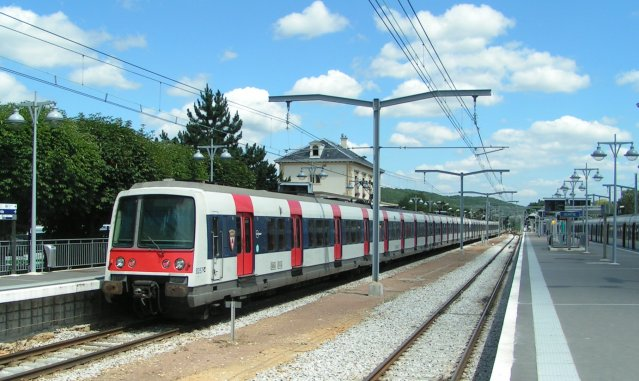
MI 79 set at Saint-Rémy-lès-Chevreuse. The overhead line and the track are new.

The line is now operated by RATP from Gare du Nord to Robinson, Massy-Palaiseau and Saint-Rémy-lès-Chevreuse; it is enjoying significant commercial success. In Paris, the trains follow one another every three minutes.

Since 1987, line B has been operated by sets called MI 79 by the RATP (and Z 8100 by the SNCF) and MI 84 (called Z 8400 by the SNCF), Eight MI 84 sets were assigned to this line to complete the MI 79 fleet; the two classes are totally compatible and mixed sets of MI 79 and MI 84 are sometimes seen.

Since 2002, the RATP has carried out major work to replace the overhead line and its supports, as well as the ticket validation equipment. Consistent signage has been put in place for passengers, who also benefit from real-time information on train movements.
