= Robinson station =

Railway station in Sceaux, France

Robinson
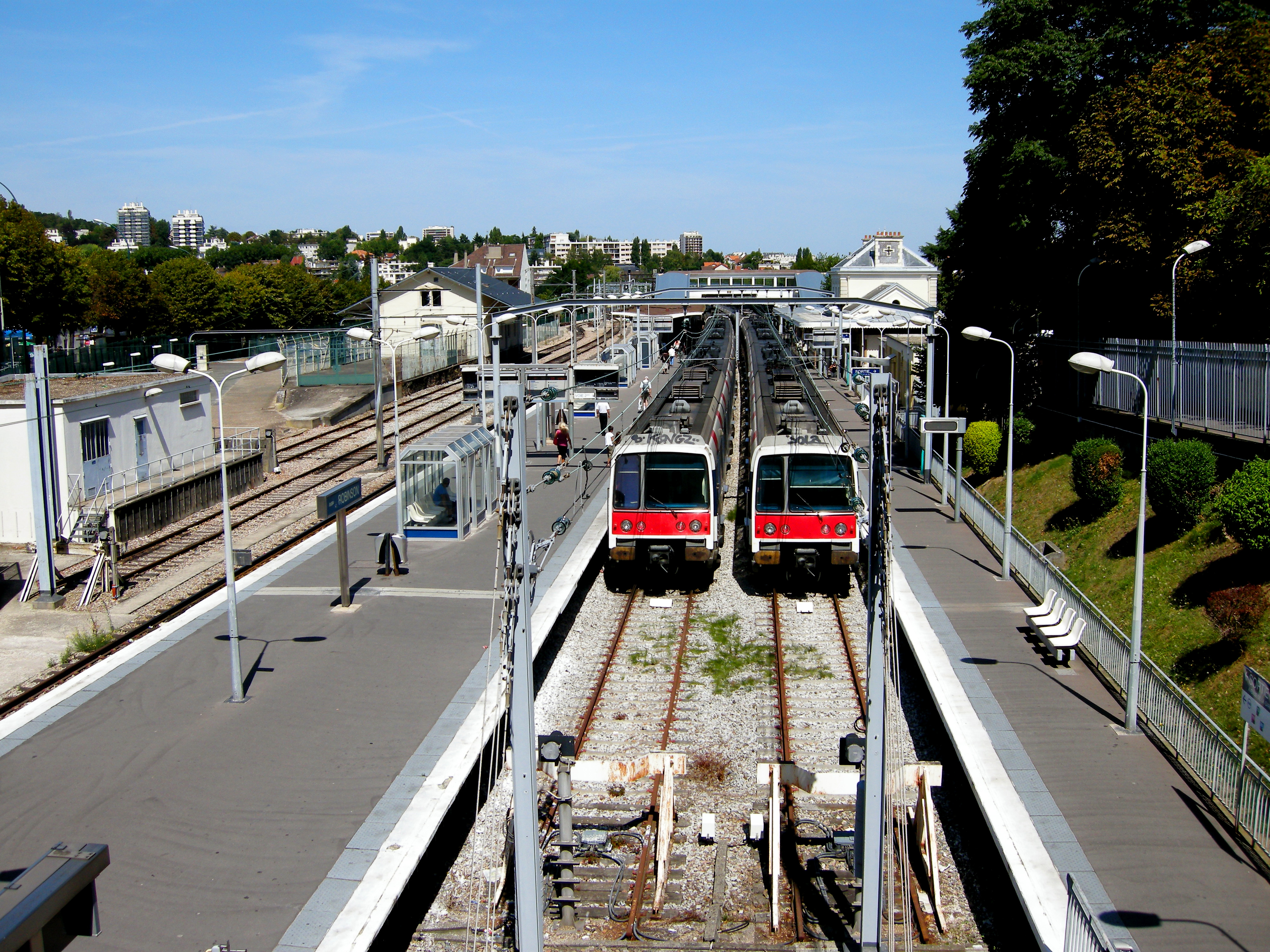
- Robinson station platforms

General information
- Location: Avenue de la Gare; Sceaux; France
- Coordinates: 48°46′49″N 2°16′52″E
- Operator: RATP Group
- Line: Ligne de Sceaux
- Platforms: 1 island platform 1 side platform
- Tracks: 3 + 2 storage tracks

Construction
- Structure type: At-grade
- Accessible: Yes, by request to staff

Other information
- Station code: 87758722
- Fare zone: 3

Services
Preceding station	RER	Following station
Fontenay-aux-Roses towards Mitry–Claye	RER B	Terminus
Location

Robinson is a railway station serving Sceaux, a southern suburb of Paris, France. It is one of the terminuses of the RER B trains.

The station is named after the nearby commune Le Plessis-Robinson (which itself is ultimately named after Robinson Crusoe).
