= Saint-Rémy-lès-Chevreuse station =

Railway station in Saint-Rémy-lès-Chevreuse, France

Saint-Rémy-lès-Chevreuse
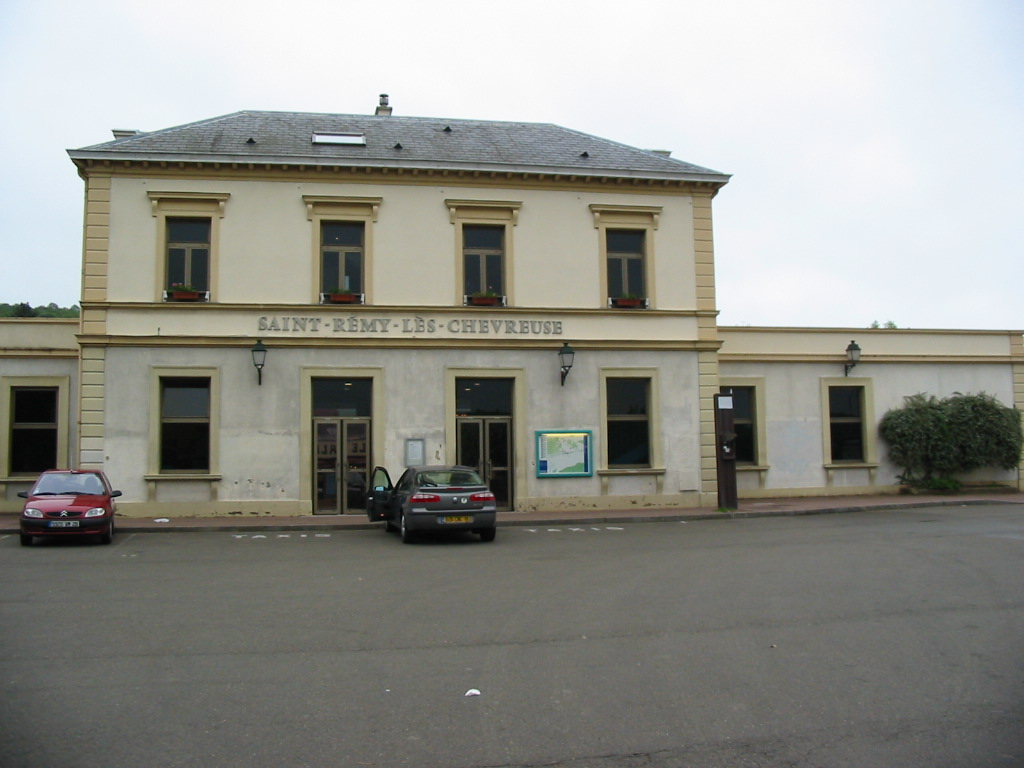
- Saint-Rémy-lès-Chevreuse station entrance

General information
- Location: Saint-Rémy-lès-Chevreuse; France
- Coordinates: 48°42′11″N 2°4′12″E
- Operator: RATP Group
- Line: Ligne de Sceaux
- Platforms: 1 side platform 1 island platform
- Tracks: 3 + 5 storage tracks

Construction
- Structure type: At-grade
- Parking: Yes
- Cycle facilities: Covered racks
- Accessible: Yes, by request to staff

Other information
- Station code: 87758896
- Fare zone: 5

History
- Opened: 26 August 1867
- Rebuilt: 1977

Services
| Preceding station | RER | Following station |
|---|---|---|
| Courcelle-sur-Yvette towards Aéroport Charles de Gaulle 2 TGV or Mitry–Claye | RER B | Terminus |
Location

Saint-Rémy-lès-Chevreuse station is a railway station in Saint-Rémy-lès-Chevreuse, a southern suburb of Paris.

== The station ==
The station opened on 26 August 1867 and is on the Ligne de Sceaux and has been an RER station since 9 December 1977. The station is served by RER Line B services operated by RATP.
