= Canton of Dammartin-en-Goële =

Coordinates: 49°02′22″N 2°43′19″E

Dammartin-en-Goële
- Former canton
- Interactive map of Dammartin-en-Goële
- Country: France
- Region: Île-de-France
- Department: Seine-et-Marne
- No. of communes: {{{nbcomm}}}
- Disbanded: 2015
- Area: 192.32 km^{2} (74.26 sq mi)
- Population (2012): 46,278
  - Density: 240.63/km^{2} (623.23/sq mi)

The canton of Dammartin-en-Goële is a French former administrative division, located in the arrondissement of Meaux, in the Seine-et-Marne département (Île-de-France région). It was disbanded following the French canton reorganisation which came into effect in March 2015.

== Demographics ==
Historical population
| Year | Pop. | ±% |
|---|---|---|
| 1999 | 40,044 | — |
| 2006 | 43,325 | +8.2% |
| 2012 | 46,278 | +6.8% |

== Composition ==
The canton of Dammartin-en-Goële was composed of 23 communes:

- Cuisy
- Dammartin-en-Goële
- Forfry
- Gesvres-le-Chapitre
- Juilly
- Longperrier
- Marchémoret
- Mauregard
- Le Mesnil-Amelot
- Montgé-en-Goële
- Monthyon
- Moussy-le-Neuf
- Moussy-le-Vieux
- Oissery
- Othis
- Le Plessis-l'Évêque
- Rouvres
- Saint-Mard
- Saint-Pathus
- Saint-Soupplets
- Thieux
- Villeneuve-sous-Dammartin
- Vinantes

== See also ==
- Cantons of the Seine-et-Marne department
- Communes of the Seine-et-Marne department
