= Communauté de communes de la Plaine de France =

Coordinates: 49.034°N 2.5806°E

Plaine de France
- Former communauté de communes
- Country: France
- Region: Île-de-France
- Department: Seine-et-Marne
- No. of communes: {{{nbcomm}}}
- Established: 1990
- Disbanded: 2013
- Area: 60.84 km^{2} (23.49 sq mi)
- Population (1999): 11,651
  - Density: 191.5/km^{2} (496.0/sq mi)

The Communauté de communes de la Plaine de France is a former federation of municipalities (communauté de communes) in the Plaine de France (also known as the Pays de France) within the Seine-et-Marne département and the Île-de-France région of France. It was created in May 1990. It was merged into the new Communauté de communes Plaines et Monts de France in June 2013.

== Composition ==
The Communauté de communes comprised the following communes:

- Juilly
- Mauregard
- Le Mesnil-Amelot
- Moussy-le-Vieux
- Nantouillet
- Othis
- Rouvres
- Vinantes

== See also ==
- Communes of the Seine-et-Marne department
