= Dammartin =

Dammartin may refer to:

== People ==
- Alberic II of Dammartin (1135-1200), a French count
- Renaud I, Count of Dammartin (1165-1227), Count of Boulogne
- Maud de Dammartin, known as Matilda II, Countess of Boulogne (d. 1260)
- Jean II de Trie, called John I, Count of Dammartin (1225-1302)
- Simon of Dammartin, Count of Ponthieu (1180-1239), son of Alberic II of Dammartin
- Joan, of Dammartin, Countess of Ponthieu, queen consort of Castile and León, daughter of Simon
- François de Montmorency, Count of Dammartin (1530-1579), a French count
- Jean de Dammartin (d. 1454), architect of Tours Cathedral

== Places ==
- Dammartin-Marpain, a commune in the department of Jura, France
- Dammartin-en-Goële, a commune in the department of Seine-et-Marne, France
- Dammartin-en-Goële, a canton in the department of Seine-et-Marne, France
- Dammartin-en-Serve, a commune in the department of Yvelines, France
- Dammartin-les-Templiers, a commune in the department of Doubs, France
- Dammartin-sur-Meuse, a commune in the department of Haute-Marne, France
- Dammartin-sur-Tigeaux, a commune in the department of Seine-et-Marne, France
- Villeneuve-sous-Dammartin, a commune in the department of Seine-et-Marne, France
