= Canton of Mitry-Mory =

Coordinates: 48°58′27″N 2°43′37″E

Mitry-Mory
- Canton
- Country: France
- Region: Île-de-France
- Department: Seine-et-Marne
- No. of communes: {{{nbcomm}}}
- Area: 174.58 km^{2} (67.41 sq mi)
- Population (2023): 65,858
  - Density: 377.24/km^{2} (977.04/sq mi)
- INSEE code: 77 12

The canton of Mitry-Mory is a French administrative division, located in the arrondissement of Meaux, in the Seine-et-Marne département (Île-de-France région).

== Demographics ==
Historical population
Year	Pop.	±% p.a.
2013	58,912	—
2018	62,827	+1.30%
Source: INSEE

== Composition ==
At the French canton reorganisation which came into effect in March 2015, the canton was expanded from 13 to 19 communes:

- Compans
- Dammartin-en-Goële
- Juilly
- Longperrier
- Marchémoret
- Mauregard
- Le Mesnil-Amelot
- Mitry-Mory
- Montgé-en-Goële
- Moussy-le-Neuf
- Moussy-le-Vieux
- Nantouillet
- Othis
- Rouvres
- Saint-Mard
- Saint-Pathus
- Thieux
- Villeneuve-sous-Dammartin
- Vinantes

== See also ==
- Cantons of the Seine-et-Marne department
- Communes of the Seine-et-Marne department
