= Communauté d'agglomération Roissy Pays de France =

Coordinates: 49.00°N 2.51°E

Roissy Pays de France
- Communauté d'agglomération
- Country: France
- Region: Île-de-France
- Department: Seine-et-Marne, Val-d'Oise
- No. of communes: {{{nbcomm}}}
- Established: 2016
- Area: 340.9 km^{2} (131.6 sq mi)
- Population (2018): 354,451
  - Density: 1,040/km^{2} (2,693/sq mi)

The Communauté d'agglomération Roissy Pays de France is a communauté d'agglomération in the Val-d'Oise and Seine-et-Marne départements and in the Île-de-France région of France. It was formed on 1 January 2016 by the merger of the former communauté d'agglomération Val de France, communauté d'agglomération Roissy Porte de France and 17 communes that were part of the Communauté de communes Plaines et Monts de France. Its seat is in Roissy-en-France. Its area is 340.9 km^{2}. Its population was 354,451 in 2018, of which 2,858 in Roissy-en-France and 58,811 in Sarcelles, the largest commune of the communauté d'agglomération.

== Composition ==
It consists of 42 communes:

1. Arnouville
2. Bonneuil-en-France
3. Bouqueval
4. Chennevières-lès-Louvres
5. Claye-Souilly
6. Compans
7. Dammartin-en-Goële
8. Écouen
9. Épiais-lès-Louvres
10. Fontenay-en-Parisis
11. Fosses
12. Garges-lès-Gonesse
13. Gonesse
14. Goussainville
15. Gressy
16. Juilly
17. Longperrier
18. Louvres
19. Marly-la-Ville
20. Mauregard
21. Le Mesnil-Amelot
22. Le Mesnil-Aubry
23. Mitry-Mory
24. Moussy-le-Neuf
25. Moussy-le-Vieux
26. Othis
27. Le Plessis-Gassot
28. Puiseux-en-France
29. Roissy-en-France
30. Rouvres
31. Saint-Mard
32. Saint-Witz
33. Sarcelles
34. Survilliers
35. Thieux
36. Le Thillay
37. Vaudherland
38. Vémars
39. Villeneuve-sous-Dammartin
40. Villeparisis
41. Villeron
42. Villiers-le-Bel
