= Vaudherland =

- Commune
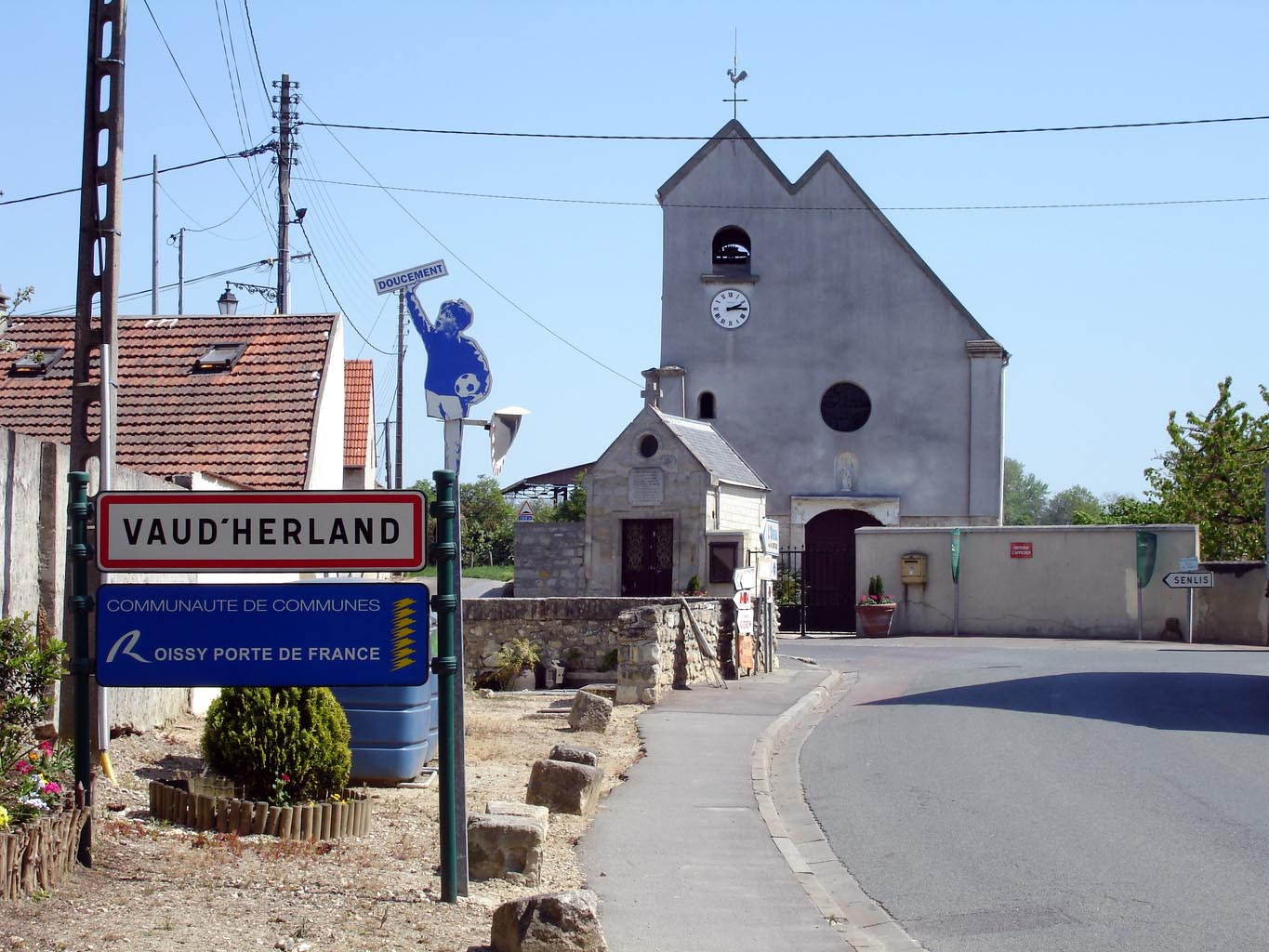
- The road into the village of Vaudherland
- Location of Vaudherland
- Location within France Location within Île-de-France (region)
- Coordinates: 49°00′05″N 2°29′13″E
- Country: France
- Region: Île-de-France
- Department: Val-d'Oise
- Arrondissement: Sarcelles
- Canton: Villiers-le-Bel
- Intercommunality: CA Roissy Pays de France

Government
  - Mayor (2020–2026): Bruno Regaert
- Area^{1}: 0.09 km^{2} (0.035 sq mi)
- Population (2023): 104
  - Density: 1,200/km^{2} (3,000/sq mi)
- Time zone: UTC+01:00 (CET)
  - Summer (DST): UTC+02:00 (CEST)
- INSEE/Postal code: 95633 /95500
- ^{1} French Land Register data, which excludes lakes, ponds, glaciers > 1 km^{2} (0.386 sq mi or 247 acres) and river estuaries.

Vaudherland (French pronunciation: [vodɛʁlɑ̃]) is a commune in the Val-d'Oise department in Île-de-France in northern France.

== See also ==
- Communes of the Val-d'Oise department
