= Gustave Coquiot =

French art critic and writer

- Born: 24 September 1865; Puits (Côte-d'Or)
- Died: 6 June 1926 (aged 60); Paris
- Occupations: Art critic, writer

Gustave Coquiot (French: [ɡystav kɔkjɔ]; 24 September 1865 – 6 June 1926) was a French art critic and writer. A collector of paintings by Maurice Utrillo, he also was one of Auguste Rodin's secretaries.

== Career ==
At least two albums of photos of French locations painted by Vincent van Gogh were taken by Coquiot in the early 1920s. These areas were painted by van Gogh over 30 years before. Many of these locations were destroyed during World War II. Other locations, like the Arles hospital, were repurposed on the 1980s.

One of the first biographies about van Gogh was written by Coquiot in 1923.

Pablo Picasso painted a portrait of Conquiot with scantily dressed dancers behind him in 1901.

== Personal life ==
Conquiot married Mauricia Coquiot, a circus performer and mayor.

== Theatre ==
- 1904: Deux heures du matin, quartier Marbeuf, play, with Jean Lorrain
- 1904: Sainte-Roulette with Jean Lorrain, Théâtre des Bouffes du Nord
- 1905: Hôtel de l'Ouest, chambre 22, play, with Jean Lorrain
- 1908: L'Ami de la justice, comedy in 1 act with Trébla

== Essais ==
- 1912 :Le vrai J.-K. Huysmans
- 1913: Toulouse Lautrec, Auguste Blaizot publisher
- 1913: Le Vrai Rodin
- 1914: Cubistes, Futuristes, Passéistes. Essai sur la Jeune Peinture et la Jeune Sculpture. Avec 48 reproductions. 5e édition. Paris, Ollendorff (n.d. ca. 1920). 277 pp. [First edition was published in 1914 and had 24 plates in phototypie]
- 1917: Rodin à l'Hôtel de Biron et à Meudon, Ollendorff, Paris, (Online)
- 1921: Vagabondages, illustrated by Henri Epstein
- 1923: Vincent Van Gogh
- 1924: Georges Seurat
- 1925: Renoir
- 1927: Des Gloires déboulonnées with 16 reproductions new edition 1927, André Delpeuch publisher.

== Portraits ==
- By Picasso, 1901, Paris, musée national d'art moderne-centre Pompidou, Bequest by madame Coquiot (1933).
- By Picasso, 1901 (Zervos, Vol. 1, 85), huile sur carton, 46 x 37 cm, Zurich, Fondation et Collection Emil G. Bührle.

== Works cited ==
- "Pablo Picasso Gustave Coquiot [1901]". Centre Pompidou. Archived from the original on 1 April 2025.
- Bailey, Martin (1 May 2026). "Rare early photographs reveal lost sites featured in Van Gogh's paintings". The Art Newspaper. Archived from the original on 14 May 2026.
