= Le Thillay =

- Commune
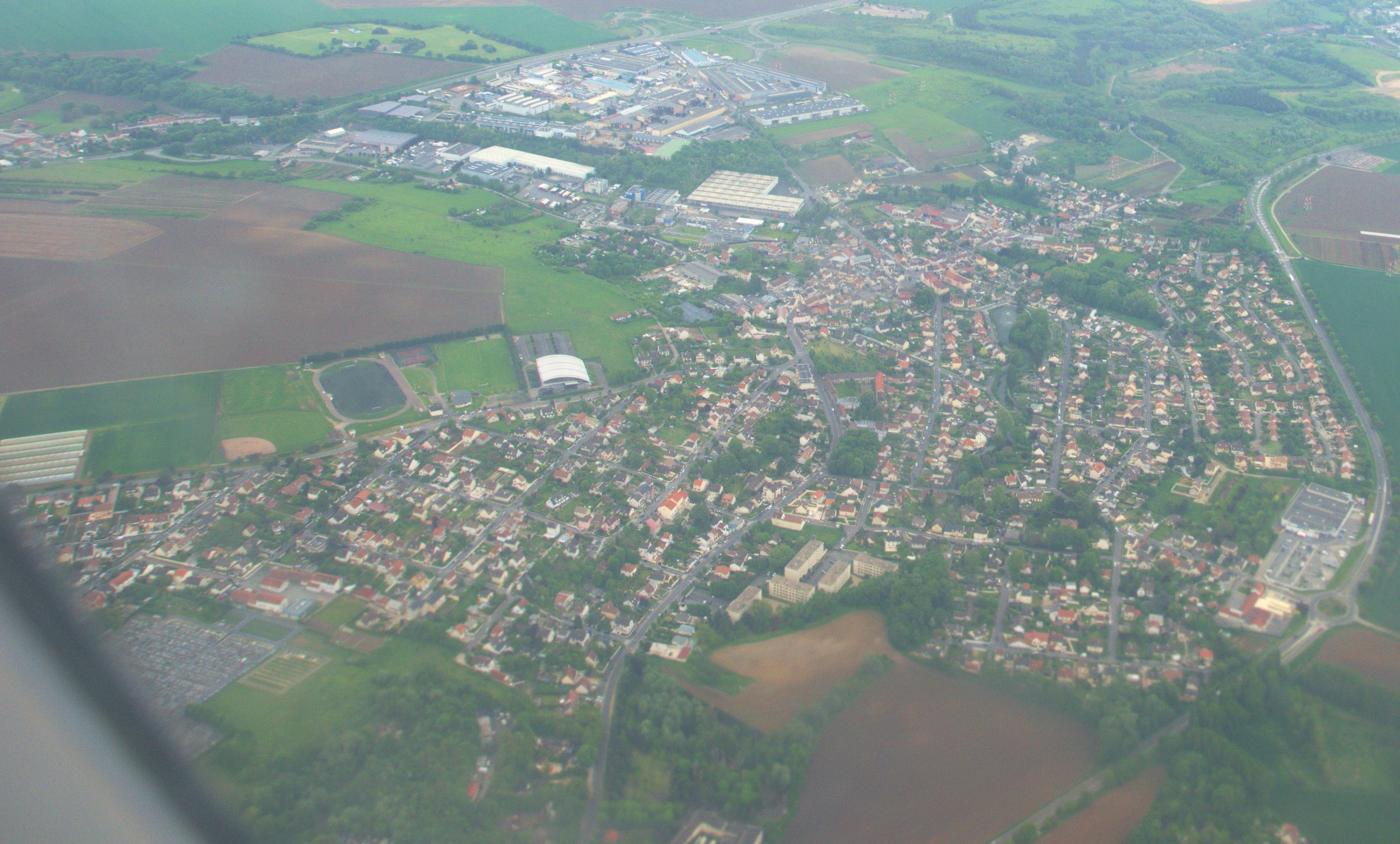
- An aerial view of Le Thillay

- Coat of arms
- Location of Le Thillay
- Location within France Location within Île-de-France (region)
- Coordinates: 49°00′20″N 2°28′18″E
- Country: France
- Region: Île-de-France
- Department: Val-d'Oise
- Arrondissement: Sarcelles
- Canton: Villiers-le-Bel
- Intercommunality: CA Roissy Pays de France

Government
  - Mayor (2020–2026): Patrice Gebauer
- Area^{1}: 3.94 km^{2} (1.52 sq mi)
- Population (2023): 4,560
  - Density: 1,160/km^{2} (3,000/sq mi)
- Time zone: UTC+01:00 (CET)
  - Summer (DST): UTC+02:00 (CEST)
- INSEE/Postal code: 95612 /95500
- ^{1} French Land Register data, which excludes lakes, ponds, glaciers > 1 km^{2} (0.386 sq mi or 247 acres) and river estuaries.

Le Thillay (French pronunciation: [lə tijɛ]) is a commune in the Val-d'Oise department in Île-de-France in northern France.

== Population ==
Historical population
Year	Pop.	±% p.a.
1968	2,836	—
1975	2,762	−0.38%
1982	2,804	+0.22%
1990	3,419	+2.51%
1999	3,665	+0.77%
2007	4,011	+1.13%
2012	4,130	+0.59%
2017	4,557	+1.99%
2023	4,560	+0.01%
Source: INSEE

== See also ==
- Communes of the Val-d'Oise department
