= Mauricia Coquiot =

French circus performer and mayor (1880–1964)

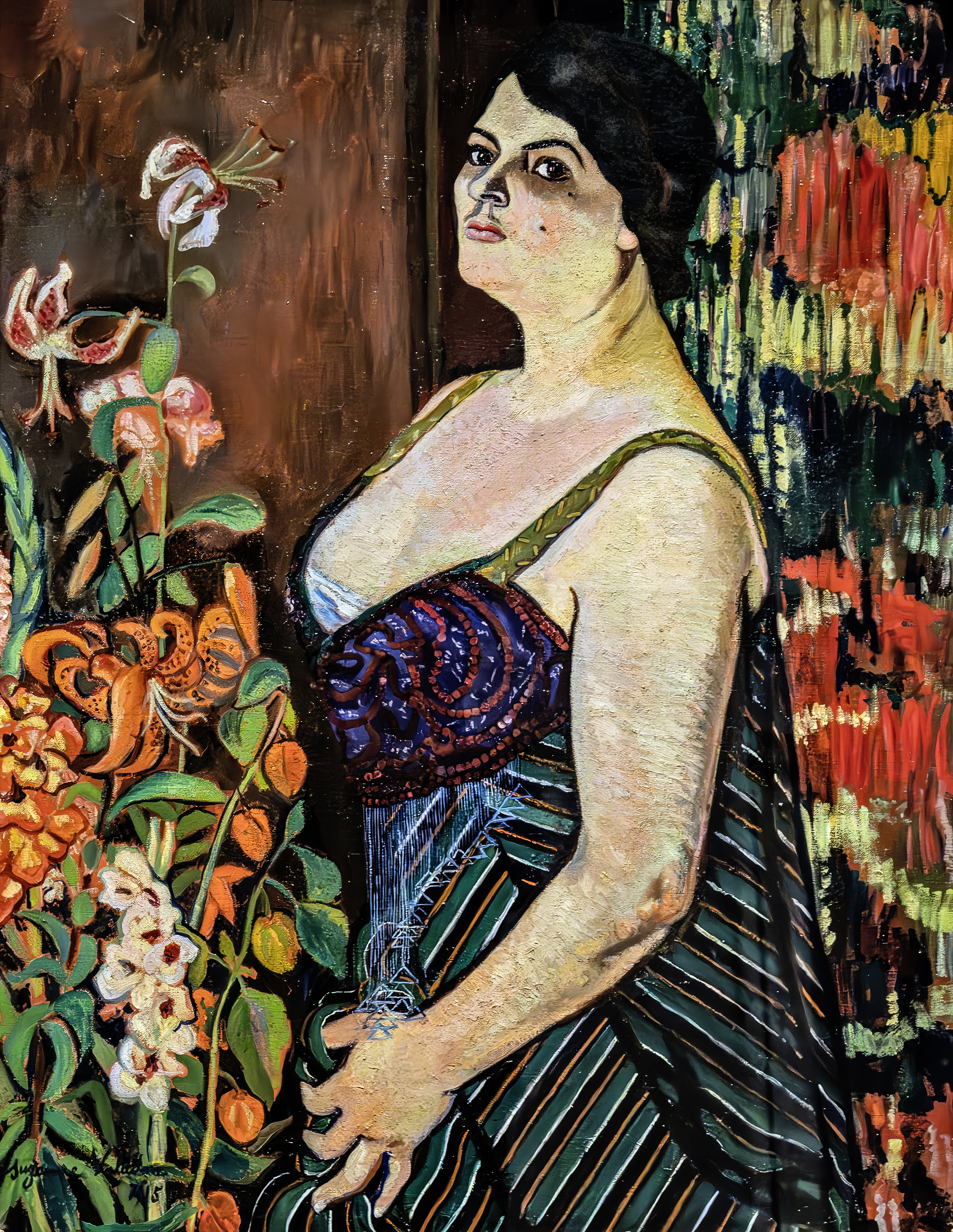
- Portrait of Mauricia Coquiot (1915) by Suzanne Valadon
- Born: Anaïs Marie Betant; 20 June 1880; Thiers
- Died: 14 September 1964 (aged 84); Othis (Seine-et-Marne)
- Occupations: Circus performer, mayor
- Known for: Car somersault act, cup and ball act
- Spouse: Gustave Coquiot

Mauricia Coquiot (born Anaïs-Marie Bétant, stage name Mauricia de Thiers) (1880–1964) was a French circus performer and later the mayor of the town of Othis for 19 years. She joined the circus in 1900 using the stage name Mauricia de Thiers. She became known as the "cup-and-ball woman" and also for her success in September 1904 with the first-ever car somersault.

== Biography ==
Born on 20 June 1880, Anaïs-Marie Bétant was the daughter of merchants in Thiers, France. At 18 she was briefly married to a croupier before she discovered the circus.

In 1916, she was married for the second time and became known as Mauricia Coquiot. Her new husband was the art critic Gustave Coquiot who was well acquainted with great artists of the time (including Van Gogh, Chagall, Picasso and the painter Suzanne Valadon, a former trapeze artist, who was a witness at their wedding). Valadon's oil portrait of Mauricia Coquiot is held at the Modern Art Museum at the Centre Pompidou in Paris.

== Circus work ==
De Thiers first performed for the French Folies Bergère and then for the American Barnum & Bailey Circus worldwide.

=== Car somersault act ===
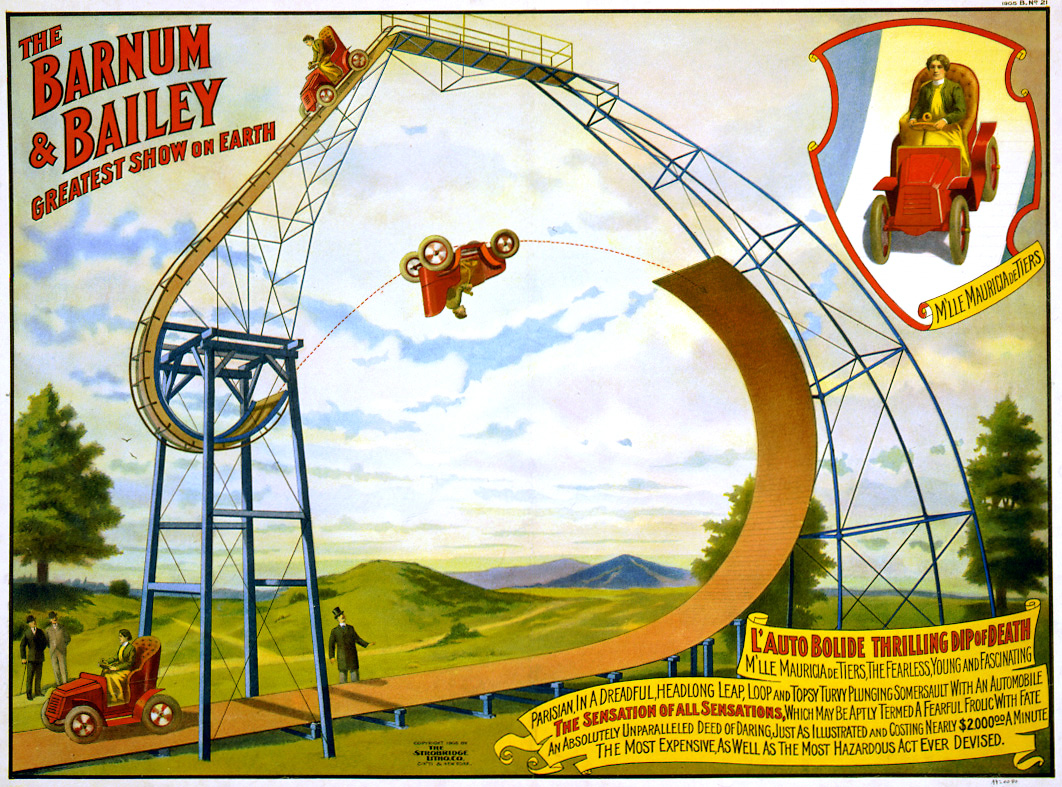
"Thrilling Dip of Death" by Mauricia de Thiers

Although she did not come from a family of performers, she achieved international fame in circuses within a few years with her Auto-Bolide (autometeor) in 1904. A Barnum and Bailey circus poster described her most famous act as the "Thrilling Dip of Death," and Mauricia de Thiers as "the fearless, young and fascinating Parisian, in a dreadful, headlong leap, loop and topsy turvy plunging somersault with an automobile." The Gallicia newspaper described de Thiers as an "extraordinarily cold blooded performer." One reporter in Chico, California dubbed the act the "greatest thriller of the century." Still, the stunt was very dangerous, and one show in Lisbon, Portugal, resulted in a life-threatening accident that de Thiers was lucky to survive.

=== Cup and ball act ===
Stick and ball toy

In 1909, de Thiers created a new act, similar to the child's toy for catching a ball on a stick. To make it work, she had a huge sphere (350 kilograms (770 lb)) constructed out of willow branches. She sat in the center of the sphere, which was launched over 40 metres (130 ft) through the air and, after several rotations, landed intact on a vertical pole. Although the act was a success, it often resulted in injuries to de Thiers who was sitting inside the sphere. Because of the trick's hazards, the Paris police suspended it at least once.

== Mayor ==
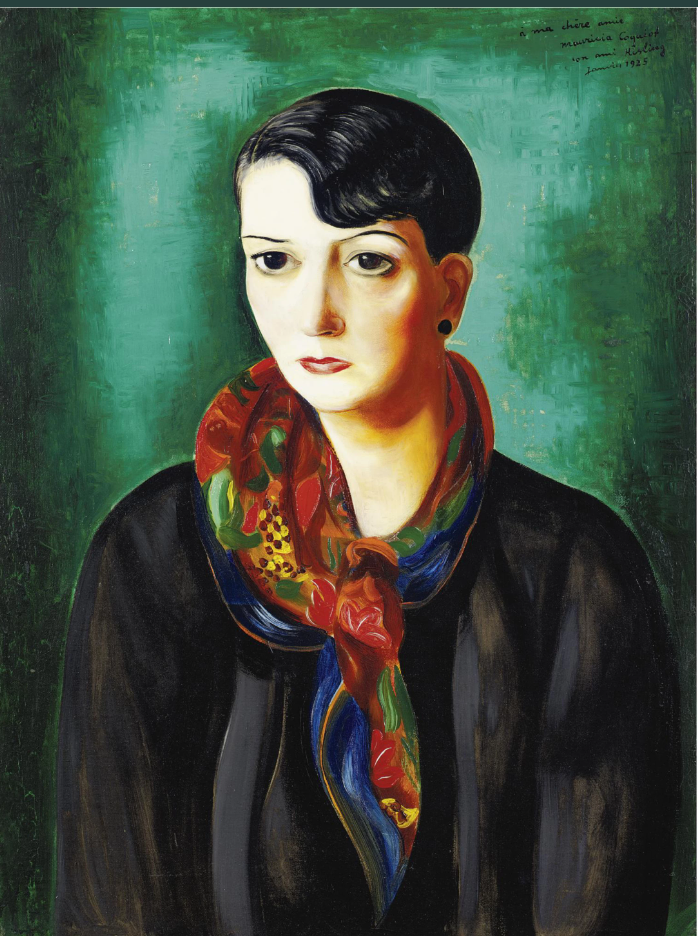
Portrait of Mauricia Coquiot by Moïse Kisling dated January 1925

With the end of her circus career, Mauricia Coquiot settled in Othis (Seine-et-Marne), France, and in 1946 was elected one of the first women in France to be elected mayor of a small town. She held the job in Othis for 19 years, wearing her tricolor sash until her death on 14 September 1964 at 84.
