= Gressy, Seine-et-Marne =

Gressy
- Commune
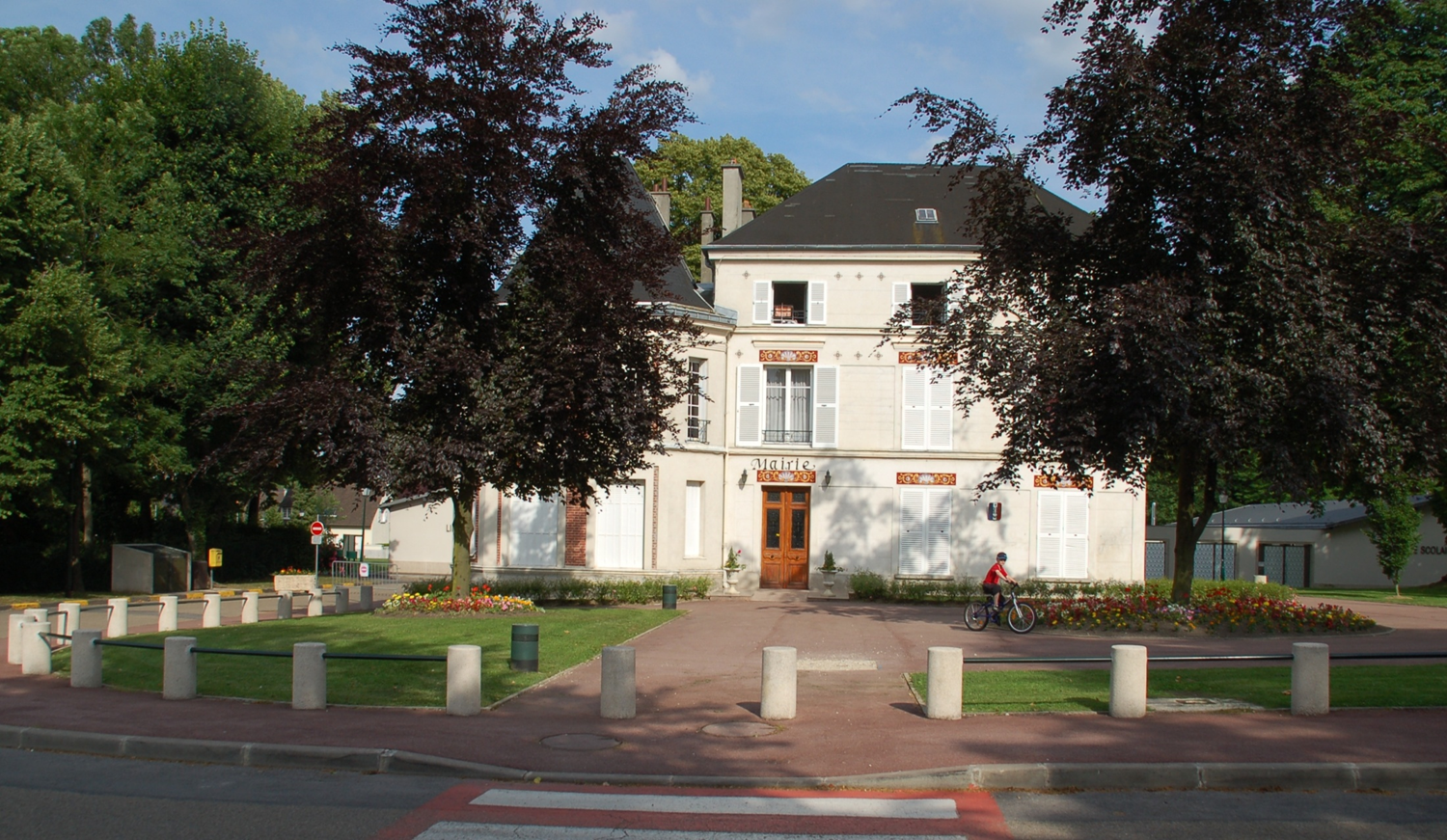
- The town hall of Gressy

- Coat of arms

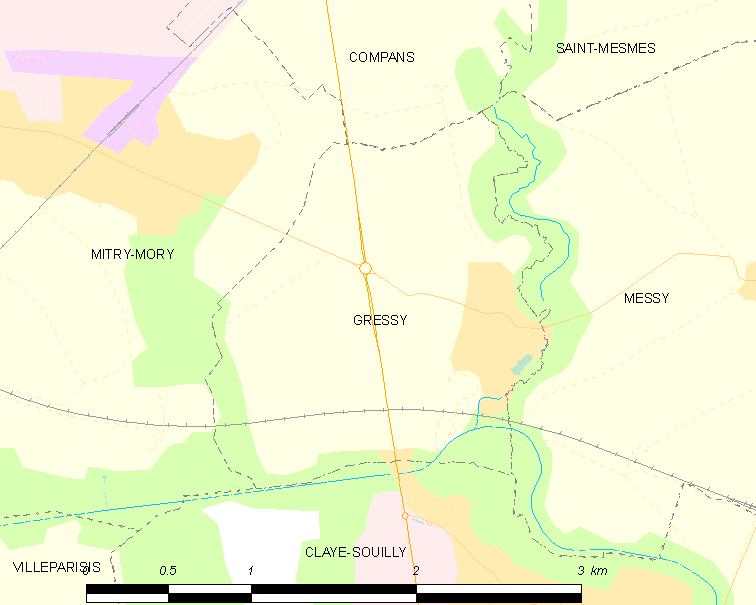
- Location of Gressy
- Location within France Location within Île-de-France (region)
- Coordinates: 48°57′56″N 2°40′26″E
- Country: France
- Region: Île-de-France
- Department: Seine-et-Marne
- Arrondissement: Meaux
- Canton: Claye-Souilly
- Intercommunality: CA Roissy Pays de France

Government
  - Mayor (2020–2026): Jean-Claude Geniès
- Area^{1}: 3.34 km^{2} (1.29 sq mi)
- Highest elevation: 72 m (236 ft)
- Lowest elevation: 51 m (167 ft)
- Population (2023): 807
  - Density: 242/km^{2} (626/sq mi)
- Time zone: UTC+01:00 (CET)
  - Summer (DST): UTC+02:00 (CEST)
- INSEE/Postal code: 77214 /77410
- ^{1} French Land Register data, which excludes lakes, ponds, glaciers > 1 km^{2} (0.386 sq mi or 247 acres) and river estuaries.

Gressy (French pronunciation: [ɡʁɛsi]) is a commune in the Seine-et-Marne department in the Île-de-France region in north-central France.

== Demographics ==
Inhabitants are called Gressiaques.

== See also ==
- Communes of the Seine-et-Marne department
