= Canton of Villiers-le-Bel =

Coordinates: 49.01°N 2.39°E

The canton of Villiers-le-Bel is an administrative division of the Val-d'Oise department, Île-de-France region, northern France. Its borders were modified at the French canton reorganisation which came into effect in March 2015. Its seat is in Villiers-le-Bel.

It consists of the following communes:

1. Bonneuil-en-France
2. Bouqueval
3. Gonesse
4. Roissy-en-France
5. Le Thillay
6. Vaudherland
7. Villiers-le-Bel
