= Bouqueval =

- Commune
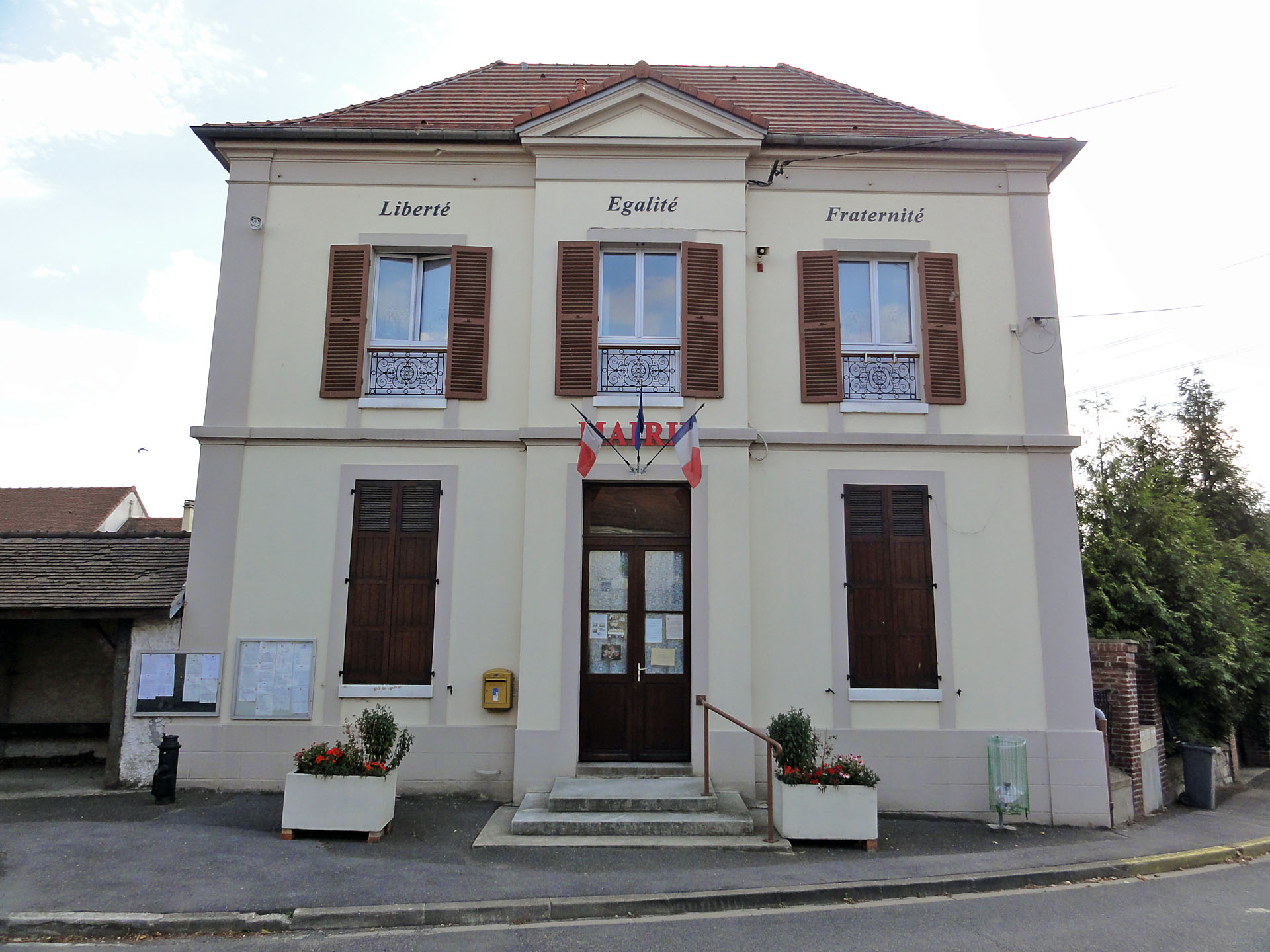
- The town hall of Bouqueval

- Coat of arms
- Location of Bouqueval
- Location within France Location within Île-de-France (region)
- Coordinates: 49°01′29″N 2°25′36″E
- Country: France
- Region: Île-de-France
- Department: Val-d'Oise
- Arrondissement: Sarcelles
- Canton: Villiers-le-Bel
- Intercommunality: CA Roissy Pays de France

Government
  - Mayor (2020–2026): Francis Mallard
- Area^{1}: 2.81 km^{2} (1.08 sq mi)
- Population (2023): 314
  - Density: 112/km^{2} (289/sq mi)
- Time zone: UTC+01:00 (CET)
  - Summer (DST): UTC+02:00 (CEST)
- INSEE/Postal code: 95094 /95720
- ^{1} French Land Register data, which excludes lakes, ponds, glaciers > 1 km^{2} (0.386 sq mi or 247 acres) and river estuaries.

Bouqueval (French pronunciation: [bukval]) is a commune in the Val-d'Oise department in Île-de-France in northern France.

== See also ==
- Communes of the Val-d'Oise department
