= Compans =

- Commune
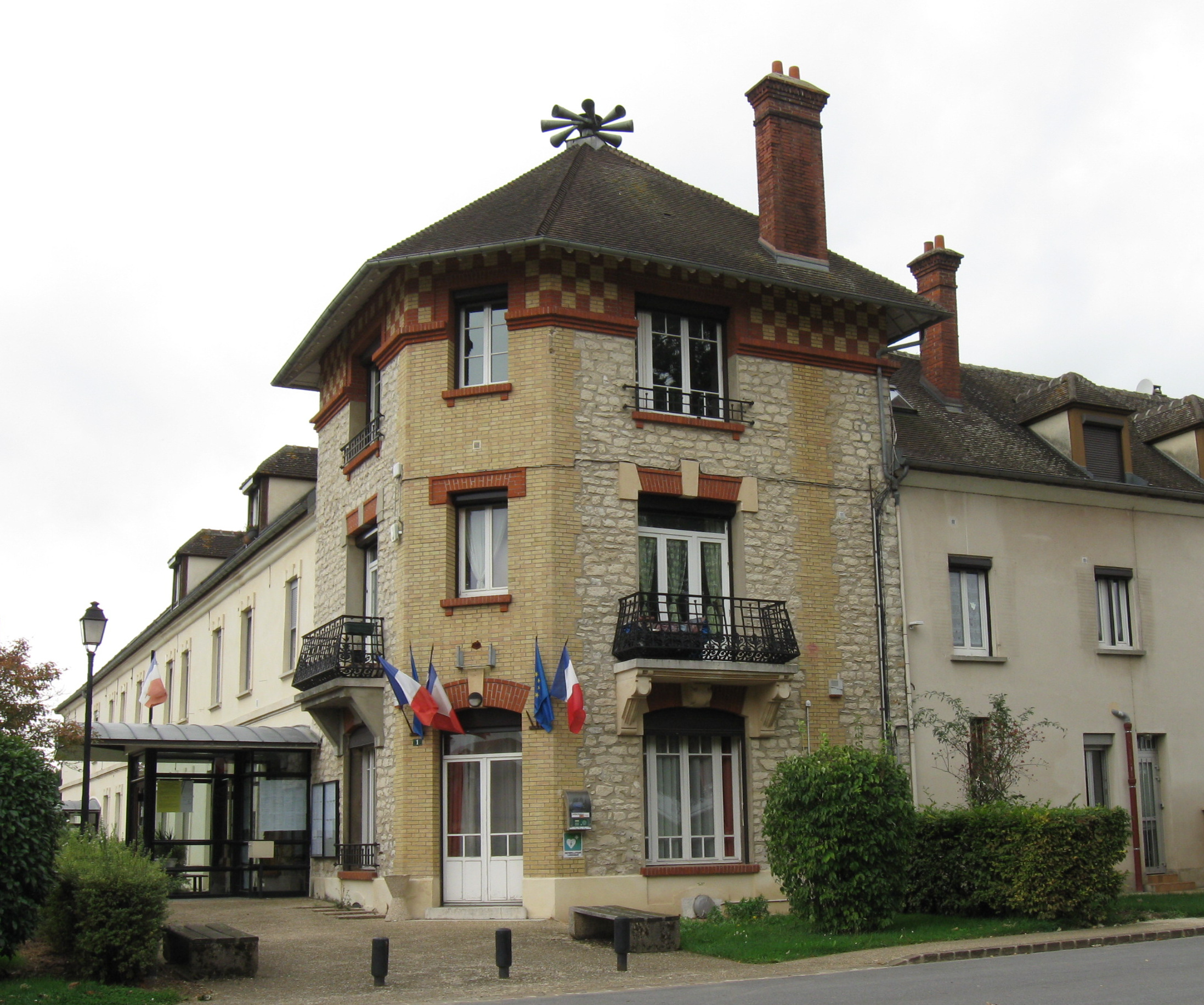
- The town hall of Compans

- Coat of arms

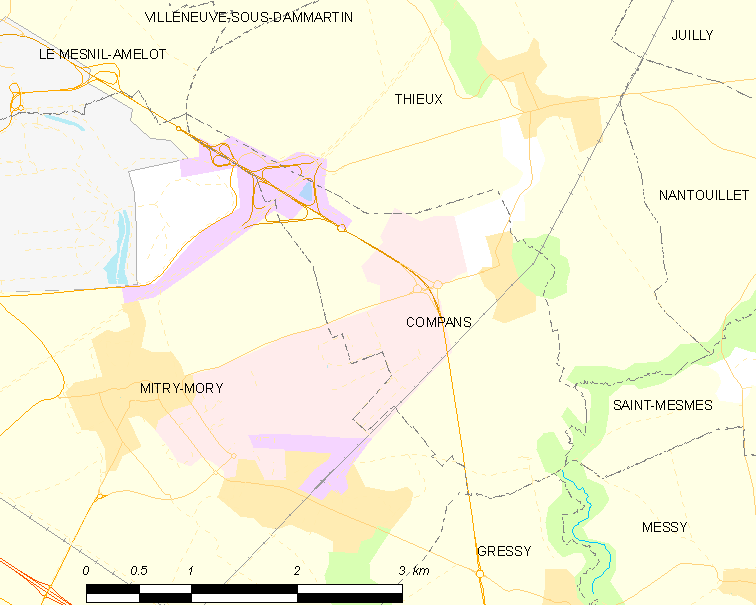
- Location of Compans
- Location within France Location within Île-de-France (region)
- Coordinates: 48°59′39″N 2°39′52″E
- Country: France
- Region: Île-de-France
- Department: Seine-et-Marne
- Arrondissement: Meaux
- Canton: Mitry-Mory
- Intercommunality: CA Roissy Pays de France

Government
  - Mayor (2020–2026): Joël Marion
- Area^{1}: 5.30 km^{2} (2.05 sq mi)
- Highest elevation: 101 m (331 ft)
- Lowest elevation: 57 m (187 ft)
- Population (2023): 754
  - Density: 142/km^{2} (368/sq mi)
- Time zone: UTC+01:00 (CET)
  - Summer (DST): UTC+02:00 (CEST)
- INSEE/Postal code: 77123 /77290
- ^{1} French Land Register data, which excludes lakes, ponds, glaciers > 1 km^{2} (0.386 sq mi or 247 acres) and river estuaries.

Compans (French: [kɔ̃pɑ̃]) is a commune in the Seine-et-Marne department in the Île-de-France region in north-central France.

== Demographics ==
The inhabitants are called Compannais.

== See also ==
- Communes of the Seine-et-Marne department
