= Moussy-le-Neuf =

- Commune
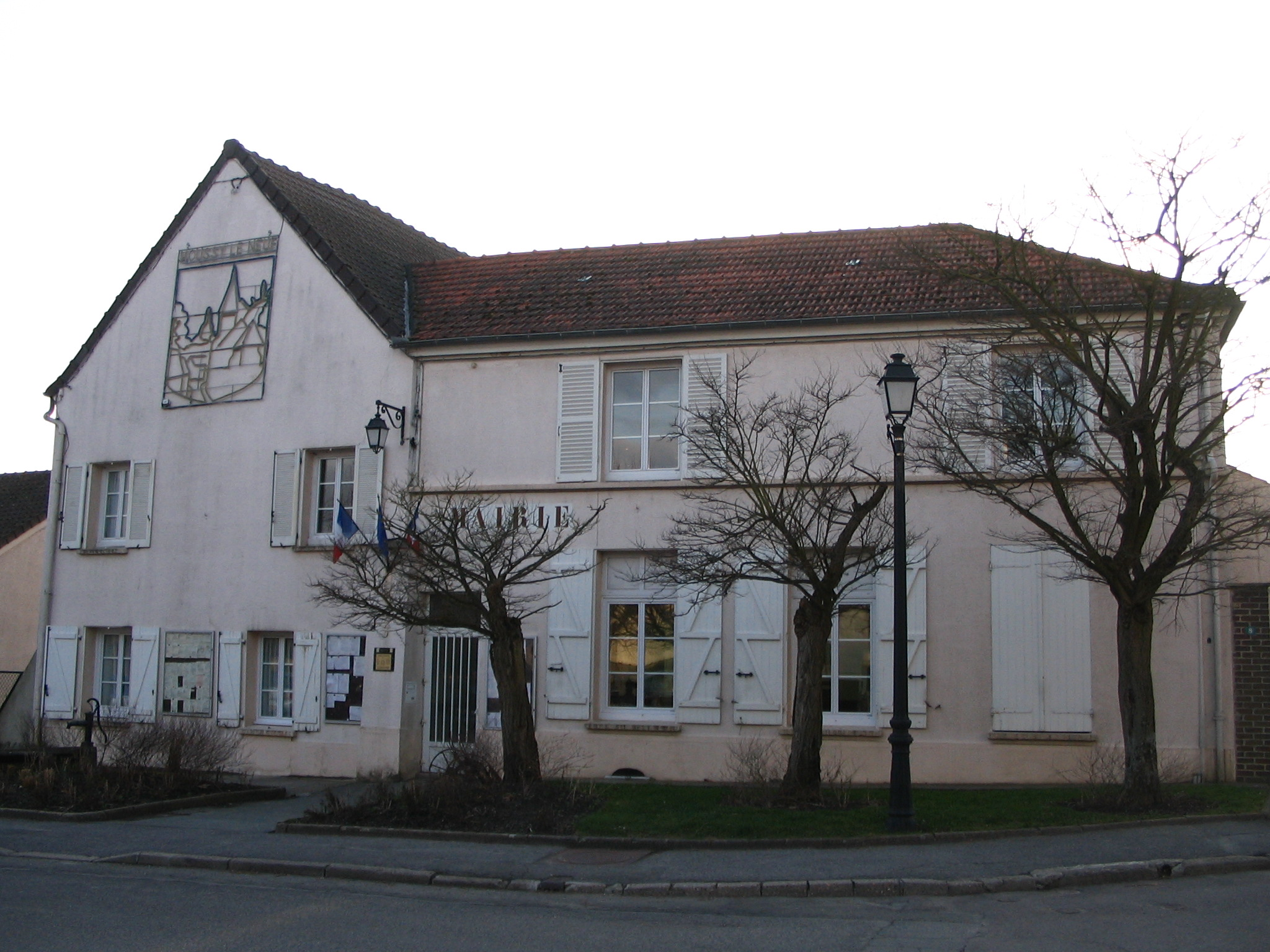
- The town hall in Moussy-le-Neuf

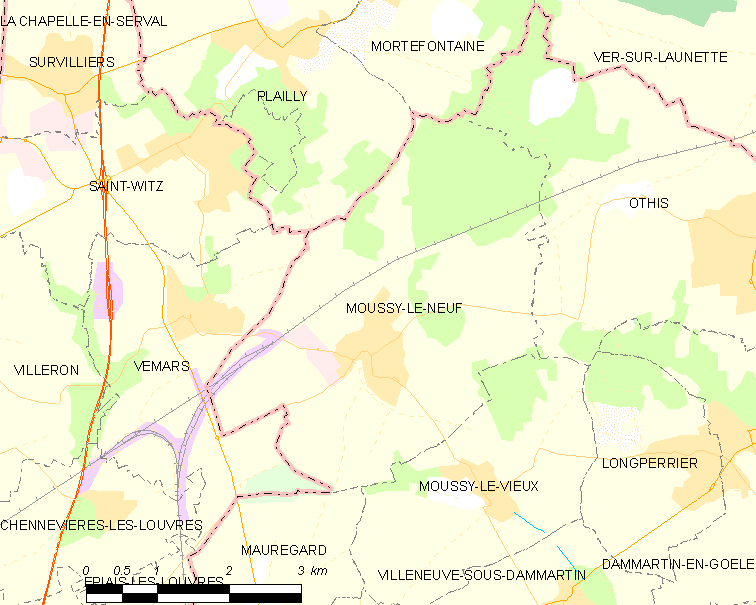
- Location of Moussy-le-Neuf
- Location within France Location within Île-de-France (region)
- Coordinates: 49°04′00″N 2°36′00″E
- Country: France
- Region: Île-de-France
- Department: Seine-et-Marne
- Arrondissement: Meaux
- Canton: Mitry-Mory
- Intercommunality: CA Roissy Pays de France

Government
  - Mayor (2020–2026): Bernard Rigault
- Area^{1}: 14.81 km^{2} (5.72 sq mi)
- Highest elevation: 157 m (515 ft)
- Lowest elevation: 92 m (302 ft)
- Population (2023): 3,253
  - Density: 219.6/km^{2} (568.9/sq mi)
- Time zone: UTC+01:00 (CET)
  - Summer (DST): UTC+02:00 (CEST)
- INSEE/Postal code: 77322 /77230
- ^{1} French Land Register data, which excludes lakes, ponds, glaciers > 1 km^{2} (0.386 sq mi or 247 acres) and river estuaries.

Moussy-le-Neuf (French pronunciation: [musi lə nœf]) is a commune in the Seine-et-Marne department in the Île-de-France region in north-central France.

== Population ==
Historical population
Year	Pop.	±% p.a.
1968	586	—
1975	1,725	+16.68%
1982	1,740	+0.12%
1990	2,218	+3.08%
1999	2,387	+0.82%
2007	2,572	+0.94%
2012	2,927	+2.62%
2017	3,054	+0.85%
2023	3,253	+1.06%
Source: INSEE

Inhabitants are called Moussignols in French.

== See also ==
- Moussy-le-Vieux
- Communes of the Seine-et-Marne department
