= Thieux, Seine-et-Marne =

Thieux
- Commune
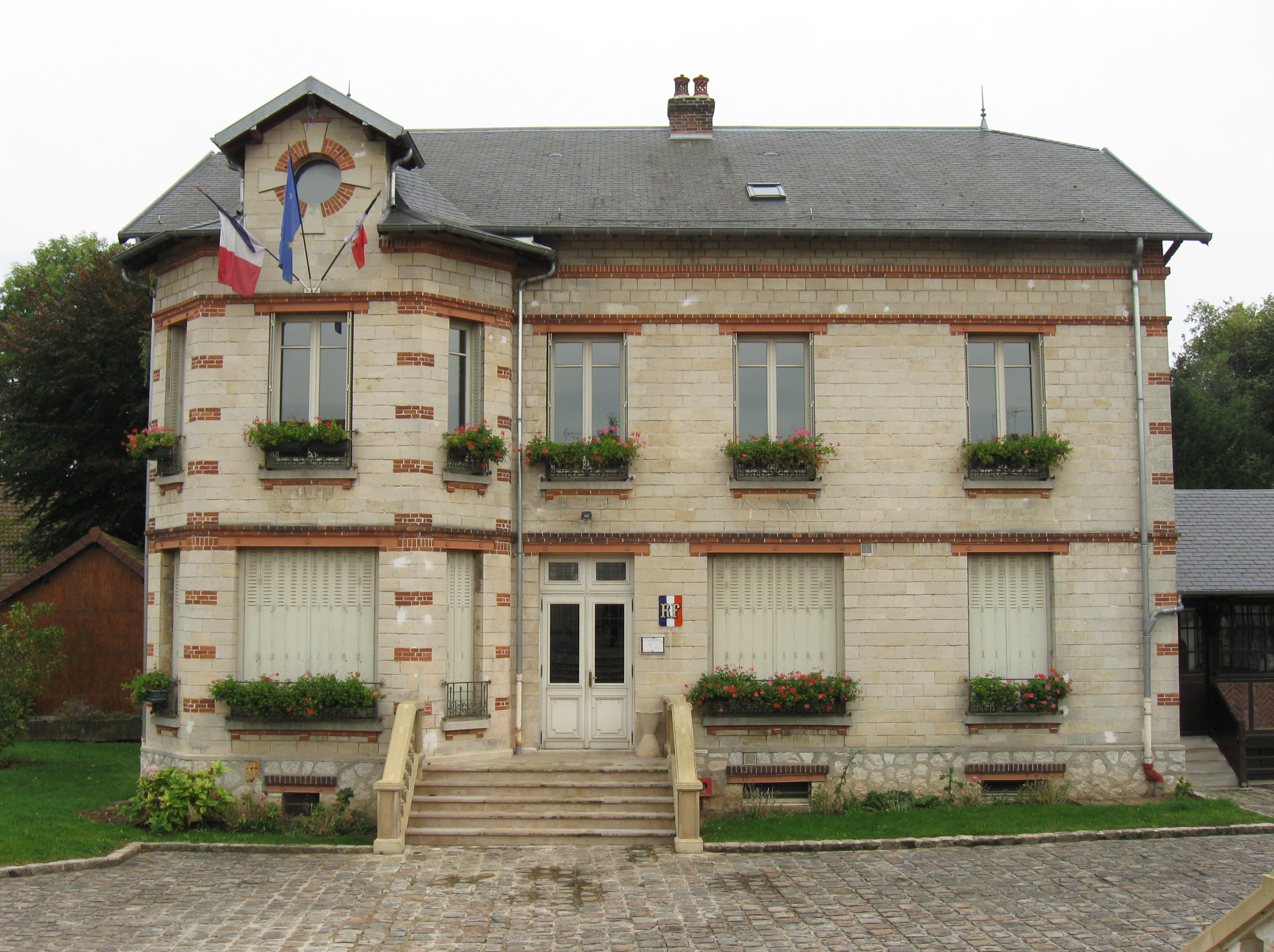
- The town Hall of Thieux

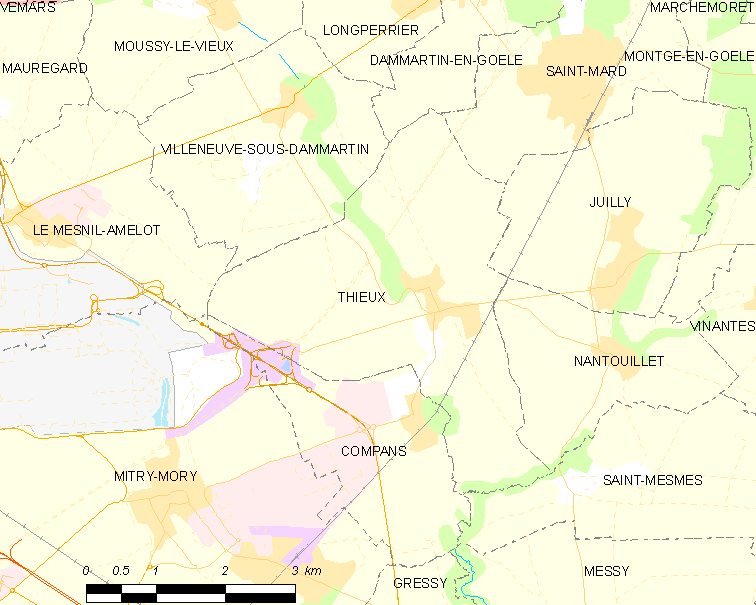
- Location of Thieux
- Location within France Location within Île-de-France (region)
- Coordinates: 49°00′36″N 2°39′59″E
- Country: France
- Region: Île-de-France
- Department: Seine-et-Marne
- Arrondissement: Meaux
- Canton: Mitry-Mory
- Intercommunality: CA Roissy Pays de France

Government
  - Mayor (2020–2026): Fabrice Cuypers
- Area^{1}: 12.07 km^{2} (4.66 sq mi)
- Highest elevation: 107 m (351 ft)
- Lowest elevation: 60 m (200 ft)
- Population (2023): 778
  - Density: 64.5/km^{2} (167/sq mi)
- Time zone: UTC+01:00 (CET)
  - Summer (DST): UTC+02:00 (CEST)
- INSEE/Postal code: 77462 /77230
- ^{1} French Land Register data, which excludes lakes, ponds, glaciers > 1 km^{2} (0.386 sq mi or 247 acres) and river estuaries.

Thieux (French pronunciation: [tjø]) is a commune in the Seine-et-Marne department in the Île-de-France region in north-central France.

== Demographics ==
Inhabitants of Thieux are called Théodosiens.

== See also ==
- Communes of the Seine-et-Marne department
