= Dammartin-en-Goële =

- Commune
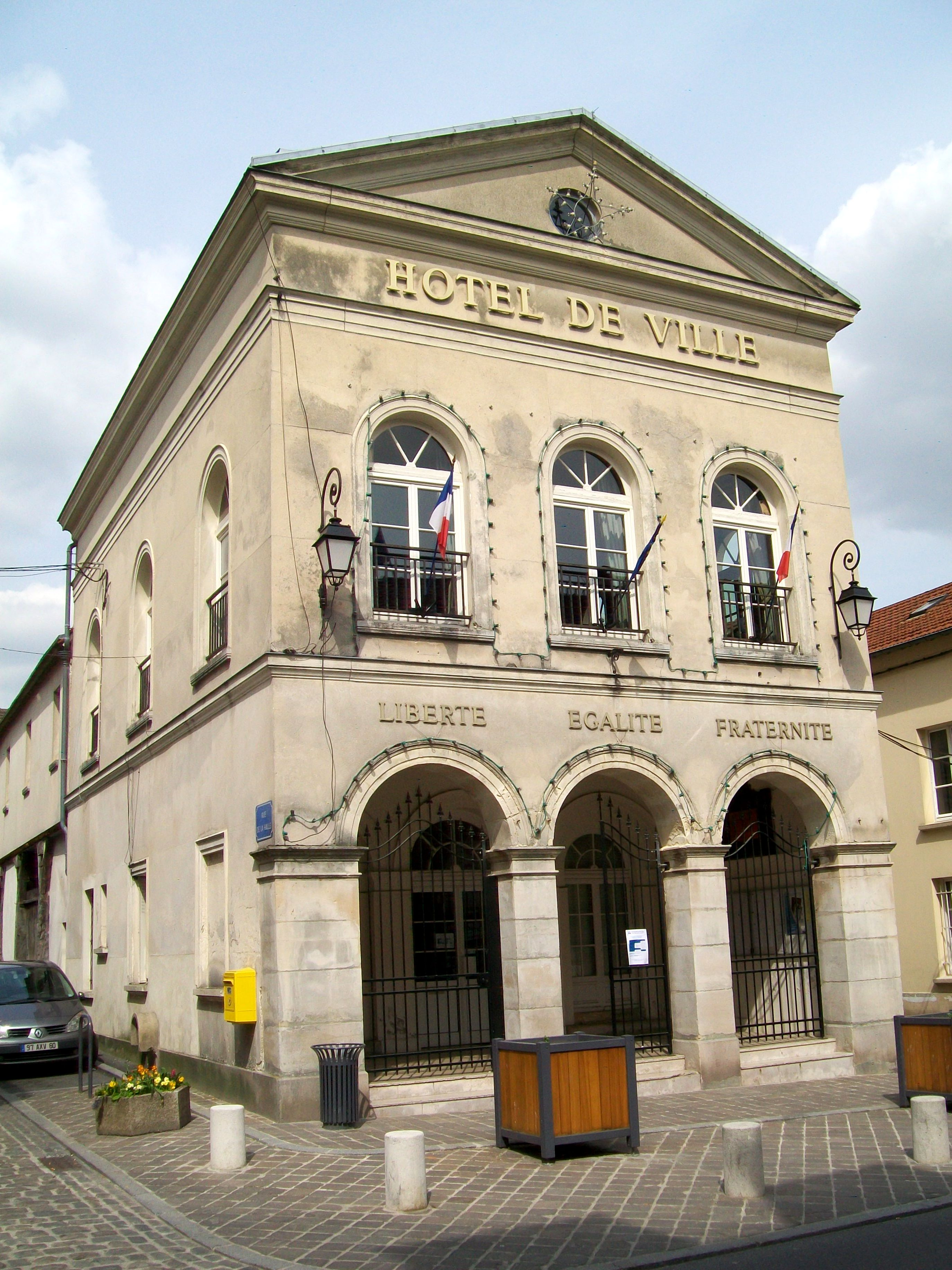
- The town hall of Dammartin-en-Goële

- Coat of arms

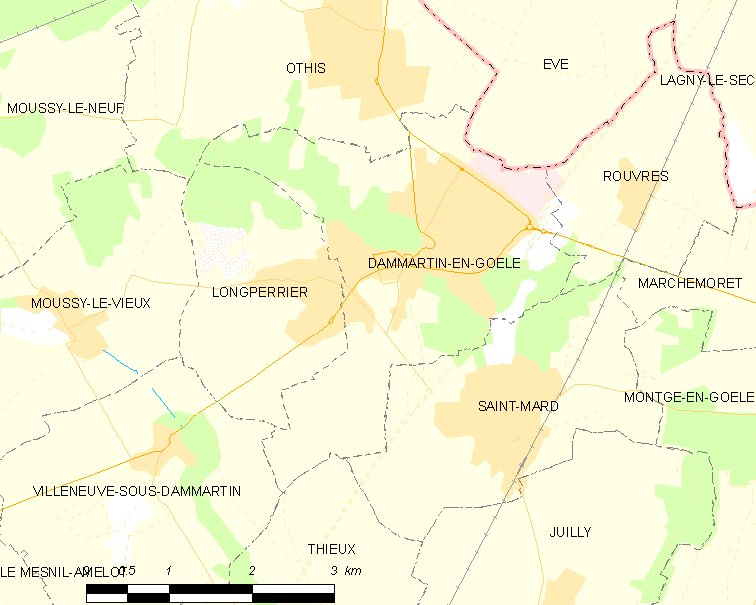
- Location of Dammartin-en-Goële
- Location within France Location within Île-de-France (region)
- Coordinates: 49°03′14″N 2°40′54″E
- Country: France
- Region: Île-de-France
- Department: Seine-et-Marne
- Arrondissement: Meaux
- Canton: Mitry-Mory
- Intercommunality: CA Roissy Pays de France

Government
  - Mayor (2021–2026): Vincent Clavier
- Area^{1}: 8.97 km^{2} (3.46 sq mi)
- Highest elevation: 180 m (590 ft)
- Lowest elevation: 84 m (276 ft)
- Population (2023): 11,907
  - Density: 1,330/km^{2} (3,440/sq mi)
- Time zone: UTC+01:00 (CET)
  - Summer (DST): UTC+02:00 (CEST)
- INSEE/Postal code: 77153 /77230
- Website: mairie-dammartin-en-goele.fr
- ^{1} French Land Register data, which excludes lakes, ponds, glaciers > 1 km^{2} (0.386 sq mi or 247 acres) and river estuaries.

Dammartin-en-Goële (French pronunciation: [damaʁtɛ̃ ɑ̃ ɡɔɛl] or [damaʁtɛ̃ ɑ̃ ɡwal], lit. 'Dammartin in Goële') is a commune in the Seine-et-Marne department in the Île-de-France region in north-central France. It is around 30 kilometres (19 mi) northeast of the centre of Paris.

== Geography ==
It is well situated on a hill forming part of the plateau of the Goële, and is known as Dammartin-en-Goële to distinguish it from Dammartin-sur-Tigeaux, a small commune in the same department. It is around 10 kilometres (6.2 mi) northeast of Charles de Gaulle Airport.

== History ==
Dammartin is historically important as the seat of a county of which the holders played a considerable part in French history. The earliest recorded count of Dammartin was a certain Hugh, who made himself master of the town in the 10th century; but his dynasty was replaced by another family in the 11th century. Reynald I, count of Dammartin (d. 1227), who was one of the coalition crushed by King Philip Augustus at the battle of Bouvines (1214), left two co-heiresses, of whom the elder, Maud (Matilda or Mahaut), married Philip Hurepel, son of Philip Augustus, and the second, Alix, married Jean de Trie, in whose line the county was reunited after the death of Philip Hurepel's son Alberic. The county passed, through heiresses, to the houses of Fayel and Nanteuil, and in the 15th century was acquired by Antoine de Chabannes (d. 1488), one of the favorites of King Charles VII, by his marriage with Marguerite, heiress of Reynald V of Nanteuil-Aci and Marie of Dammartin. This Antoine de Chabannes, count of Dammartin in right of his wife, fought under the standard of Joan of Arc, became a leader of the Ecorcheurs, took part in the war of the public weal against Louis XI, and then fought for him against the Burgundians. The collegiate church at Dammartin was founded by him in 1480, and his tomb and effigy are in the chancel.

His son, Jean de Chabannes, left three heiresses, of whom the second left a daughter who brought the county to Philippe de Boulainvilliers, by whose heirs it was sold in 1554 to the dukes of Montmorency. In the 16th century and later, an estate here called La Tuillerie was owned by Matthieu Coignet and his heirs. In 1632 the county was confiscated by Louis XIII and bestowed on the Prince of Condé.

=== Dammartin-en-Goële siege ===
On 9 January 2015, French interior minister Bernard Cazeneuve confirmed that a major operation was under way in Dammartin-en-Goële where police helicopters were deployed. This related to police attempts to capture Saïd and Chérif Kouachi, the main suspects in the Charlie Hebdo shooting. The gunmen were within a printing business called CTD and had taken a hostage. The brothers were eventually killed in a gunfight with French police.

== Demographics ==
Inhabitants of Dammartin-en-Goële are called Dammartinois in French.

Historical population
Year	Pop.	±% p.a.
1968	2,049	—
1975	3,476	+7.84%
1982	4,528	+3.85%
1990	6,620	+4.86%
1999	7,805	+1.85%
2007	7,967	+0.26%
2012	8,464	+1.22%
2017	9,920	+3.23%
2023	11,907	+3.09%
Source: INSEE

== See also ==
- Communes of the Seine-et-Marne department
- Charlie Hebdo shooting
