= Marchémoret =

- Commune
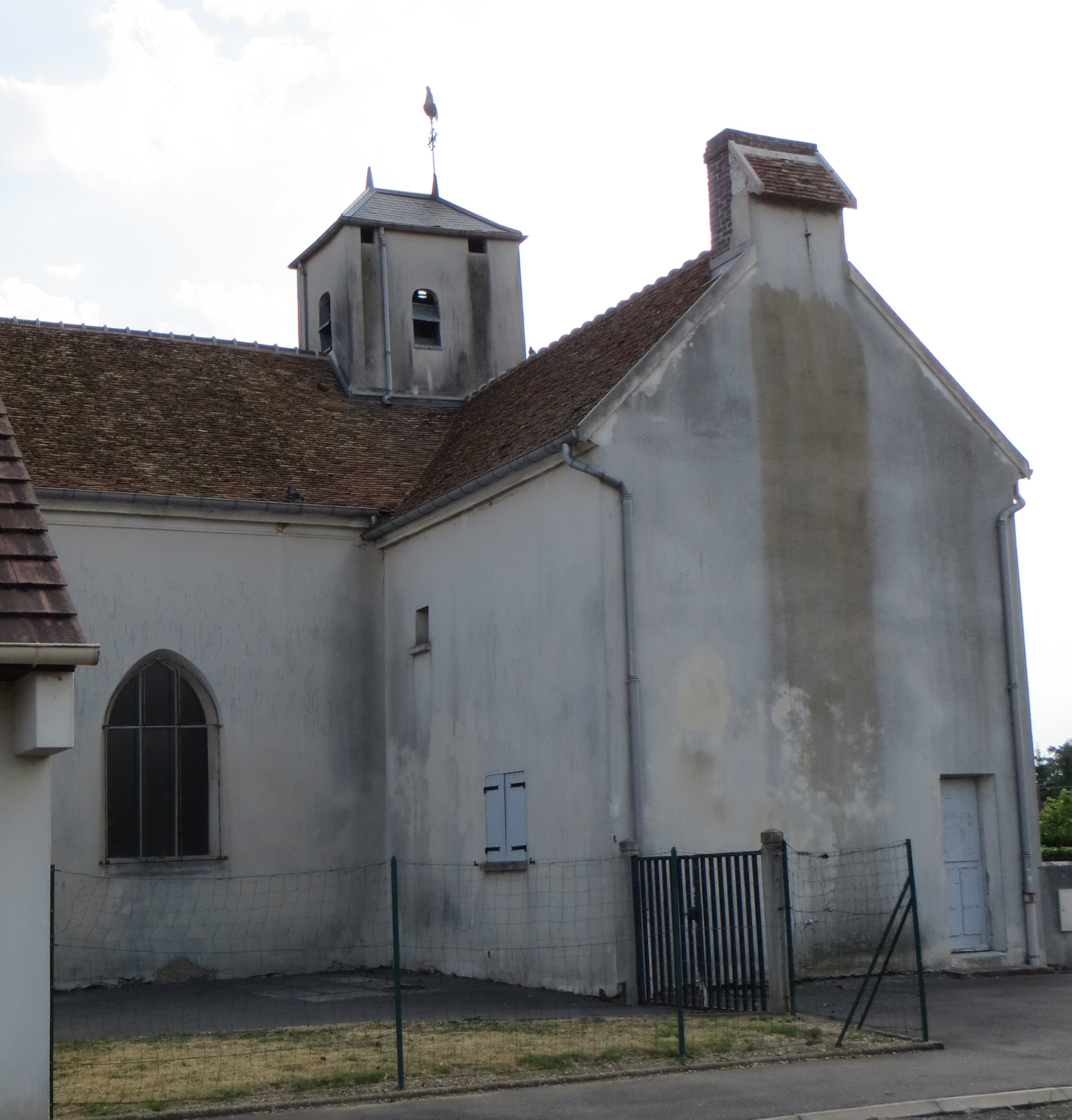
- The church in Marchémoret
- Location of Marchémoret
- Location within France Location within Île-de-France (region)
- Coordinates: 49°03′N 2°46′E
- Country: France
- Region: Île-de-France
- Department: Seine-et-Marne
- Arrondissement: Meaux
- Canton: Mitry-Mory
- Intercommunality: CC Plaines et Monts de France

Government
  - Mayor (2020–2026): Jean-Louis Durand
- Area^{1}: 7.04 km^{2} (2.72 sq mi)
- Highest elevation: 152 m (499 ft)
- Lowest elevation: 98 m (322 ft)
- Population (2023): 659
  - Density: 93.6/km^{2} (242/sq mi)
- Time zone: UTC+01:00 (CET)
  - Summer (DST): UTC+02:00 (CEST)
- INSEE/Postal code: 77273 /77230
- ^{1} French Land Register data, which excludes lakes, ponds, glaciers > 1 km^{2} (0.386 sq mi or 247 acres) and river estuaries.

Marchémoret (French pronunciation: [maʁʃemɔʁɛ]) is a commune in the Seine-et-Marne département in the Île-de-France region in north-central France.

== Demographics ==
Inhabitants are called Marchois.

== See also ==
- Communes of the Seine-et-Marne department
