= Saint-Mard, Seine-et-Marne =

Saint-Mard
- Commune
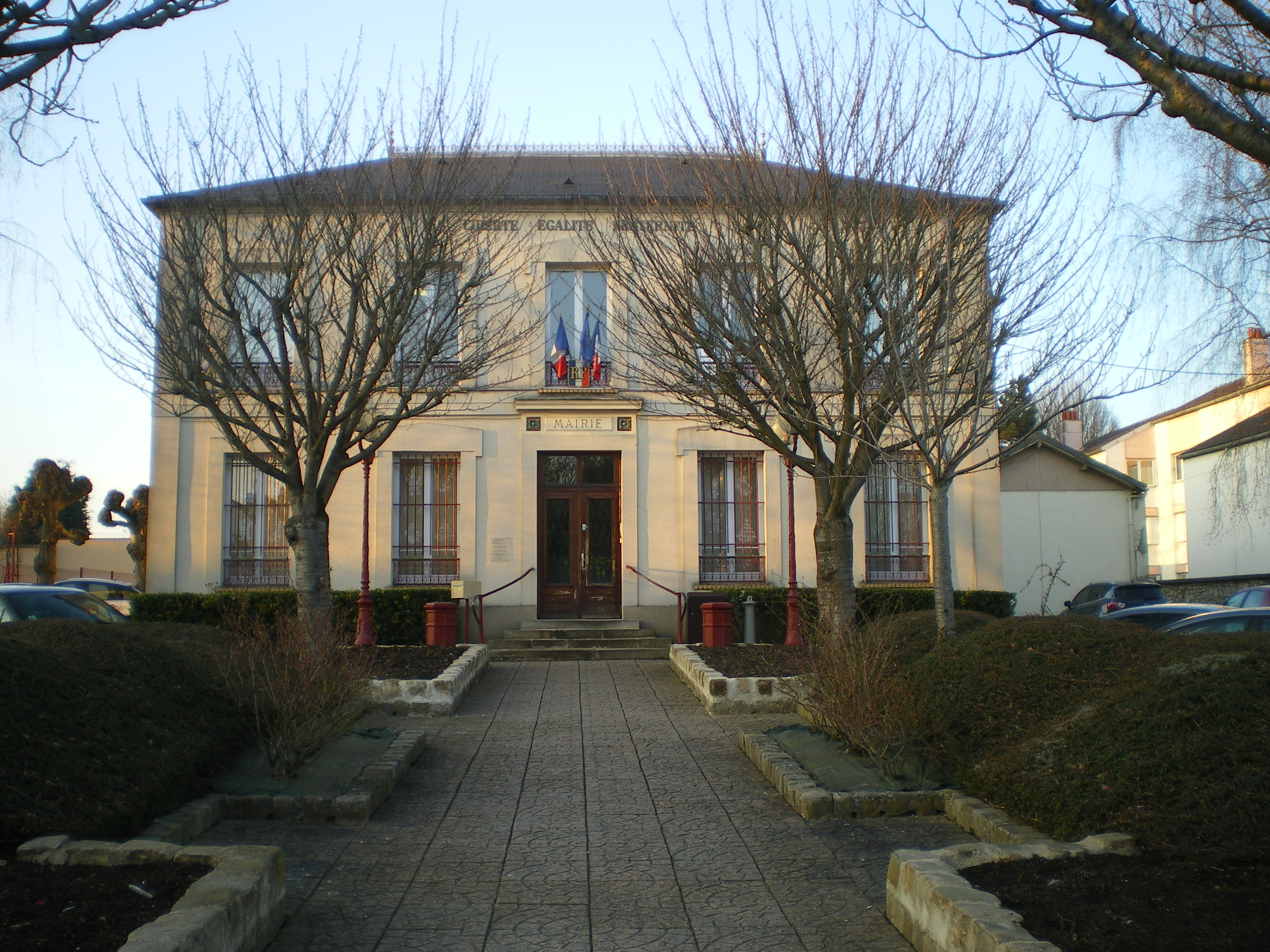
- The town hall of Saint-Mard

- Coat of arms

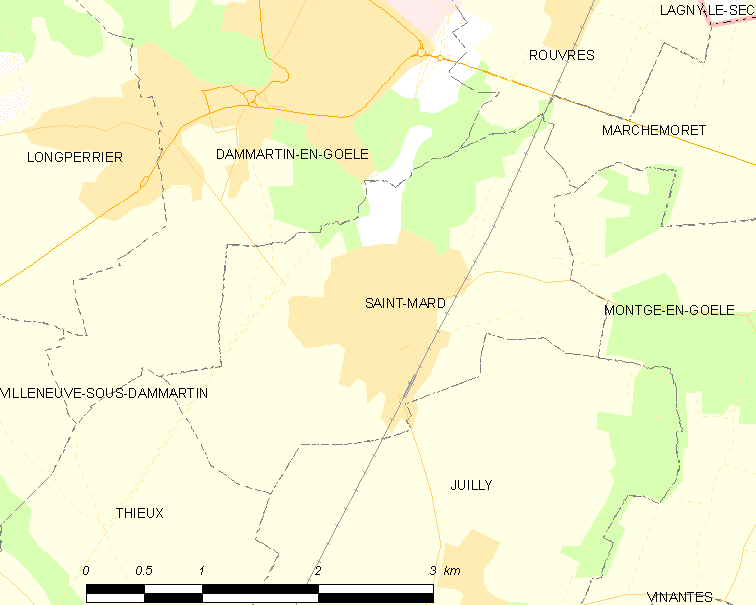
- Location of Saint-Mard
- Location within France Location within Île-de-France (region)
- Coordinates: 49°02′12″N 2°41′38″E
- Country: France
- Region: Île-de-France
- Department: Seine-et-Marne
- Arrondissement: Meaux
- Canton: Mitry-Mory
- Intercommunality: CA Roissy Pays de France

Government
  - Mayor (2020–2026): Daniel Dometz
- Area^{1}: 6.26 km^{2} (2.42 sq mi)
- Highest elevation: 166 m (545 ft)
- Lowest elevation: 93 m (305 ft)
- Population (2023): 3,832
  - Density: 612/km^{2} (1,590/sq mi)
- Time zone: UTC+01:00 (CET)
  - Summer (DST): UTC+02:00 (CEST)
- INSEE/Postal code: 77420 /77230
- ^{1} French Land Register data, which excludes lakes, ponds, glaciers > 1 km^{2} (0.386 sq mi or 247 acres) and river estuaries.

Saint-Mard (French pronunciation: [sɛ̃ maʁ]) is a commune in the Seine-et-Marne department in the Île-de-France region in north-central France.

== Population ==
Historical population
Year	Pop.	±% p.a.
1968	1,090	—
1975	2,021	+9.22%
1982	2,375	+2.33%
1990	2,959	+2.79%
1999	3,445	+1.70%
2007	3,663	+0.77%
2012	3,849	+1.00%
2017	3,857	+0.04%
2023	3,832	−0.11%
Source: INSEE

Inhabitants of Saint-Mard are called Mardochiens in French.

== See also ==
- Communes of the Seine-et-Marne department
