= Longperrier =

- Commune
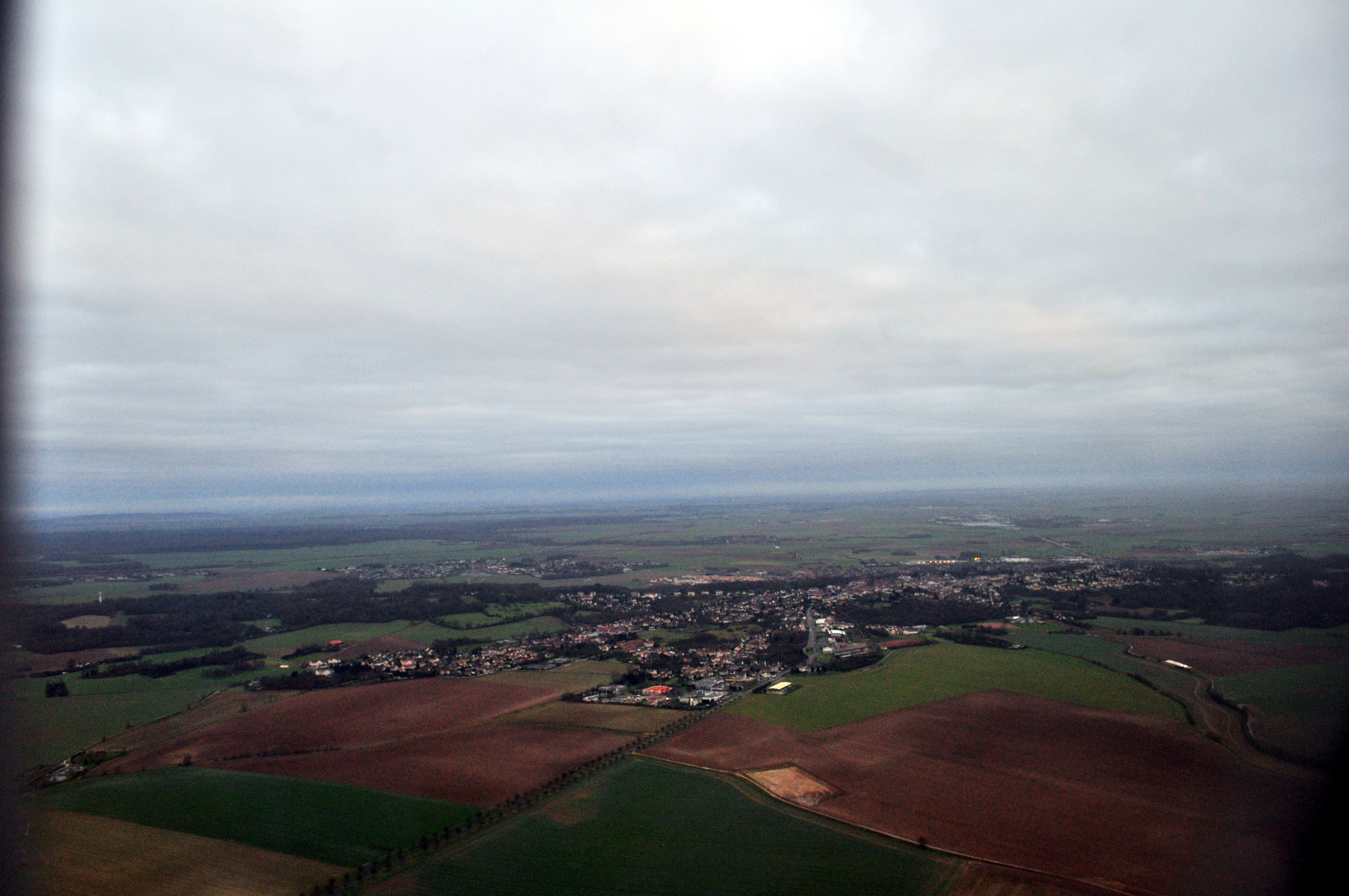
- Aerial view of Longperrier

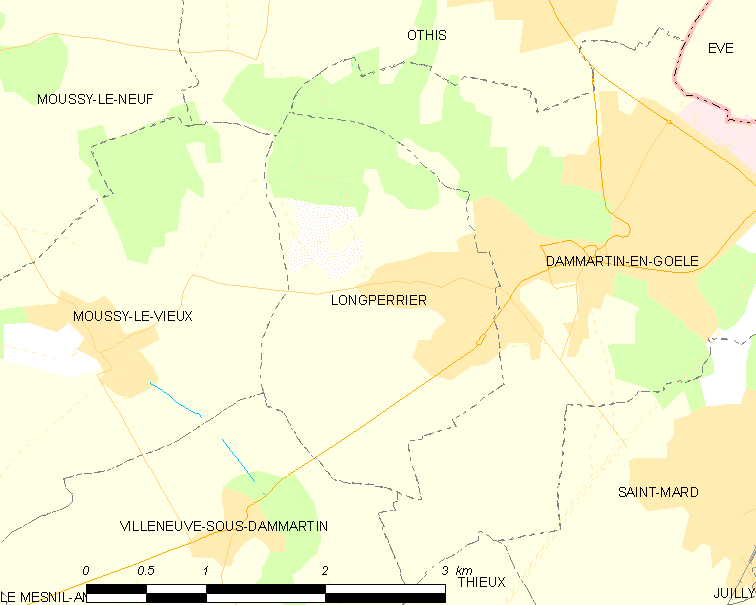
- Location of Longperrier
- Location within France Location within Île-de-France (region)
- Coordinates: 49°03′08″N 2°39′49″E
- Country: France
- Region: Île-de-France
- Department: Seine-et-Marne
- Arrondissement: Meaux
- Canton: Mitry-Mory
- Intercommunality: CA Roissy Pays de France

Government
  - Mayor (2024–2026): Florence Rongione
- Area^{1}: 4.63 km^{2} (1.79 sq mi)
- Highest elevation: 172 m (564 ft)
- Lowest elevation: 89 m (292 ft)
- Population (2023): 3,152
  - Density: 681/km^{2} (1,760/sq mi)
- Time zone: UTC+01:00 (CET)
  - Summer (DST): UTC+02:00 (CEST)
- INSEE/Postal code: 77259 /77230
- ^{1} French Land Register data, which excludes lakes, ponds, glaciers > 1 km^{2} (0.386 sq mi or 247 acres) and river estuaries.

Longperrier (French pronunciation: [lɔ̃pɛʁje]) is a commune in the Seine-et-Marne department in the Île-de-France region in north-central France.

== Demographics ==
Inhabitants are called Longperrois in French.

Historical population
Year	Pop.	±% p.a.
1968	417	—
1975	494	+2.45%
1982	696	+5.02%
1990	1,089	+5.76%
1999	2,071	+7.40%
2007	2,309	+1.37%
2012	2,474	+1.39%
2017	2,368	−0.87%
2023	3,152	+4.88%
Source: INSEE

== See also ==
- Communes of the Seine-et-Marne department
