= Montgé-en-Goële =

- Commune
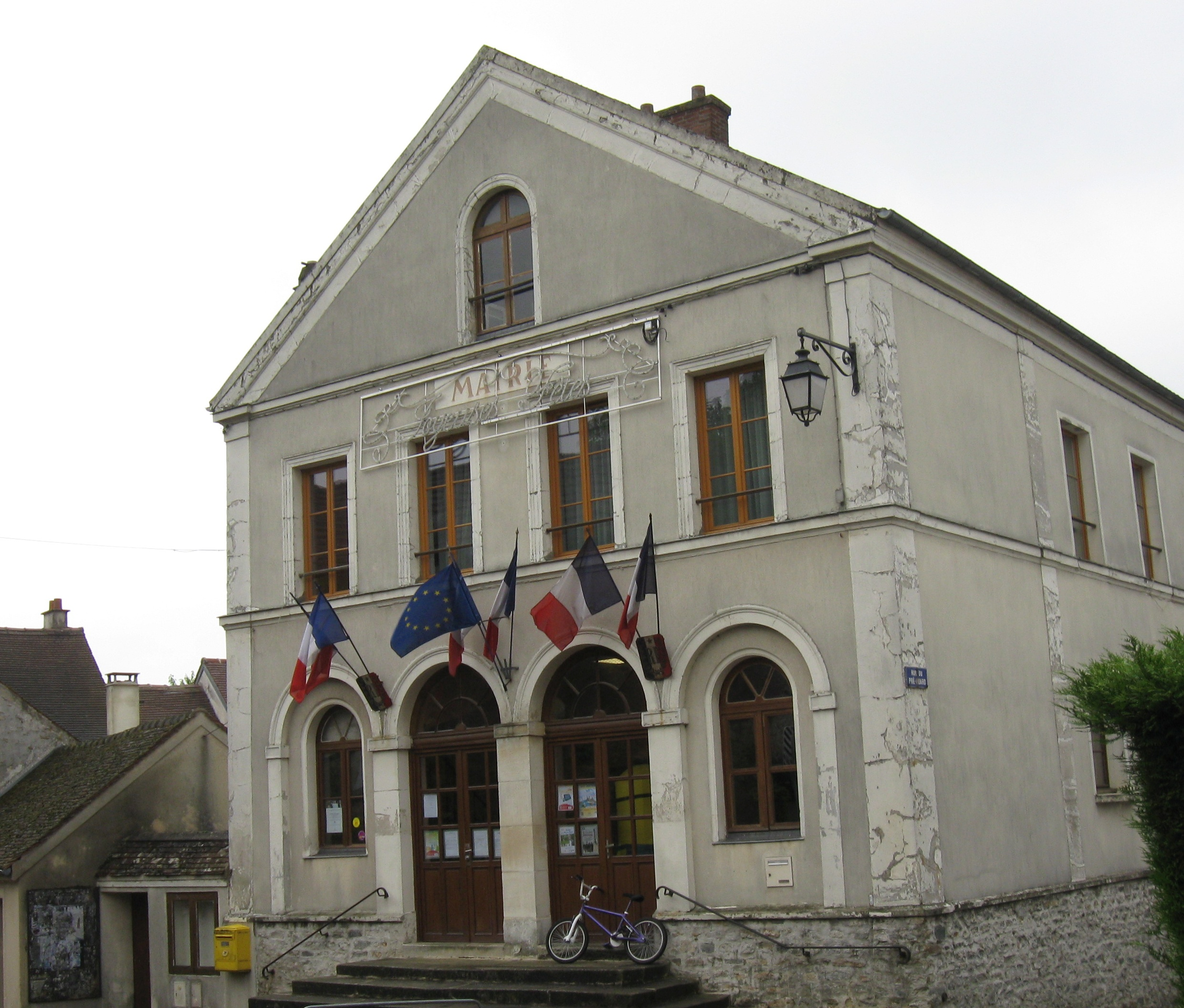
- The town hall in Montgé-en-Goële
- Location of Montgé-en-Goële
- Location within France Location within Île-de-France (region)
- Coordinates: 49°01′42″N 2°44′53″E
- Country: France
- Region: Île-de-France
- Department: Seine-et-Marne
- Arrondissement: Meaux
- Canton: Mitry-Mory
- Intercommunality: CC Plaines et Monts de France

Government
  - Mayor (2020–2026): Pascal Hiraux
- Area^{1}: 11.56 km^{2} (4.46 sq mi)
- Highest elevation: 200 m (660 ft)
- Lowest elevation: 80 m (260 ft)
- Population (2023): 717
  - Density: 62.0/km^{2} (161/sq mi)
- Time zone: UTC+01:00 (CET)
  - Summer (DST): UTC+02:00 (CEST)
- INSEE/Postal code: 77308 /77230
- ^{1} French Land Register data, which excludes lakes, ponds, glaciers > 1 km^{2} (0.386 sq mi or 247 acres) and river estuaries.

Montgé-en-Goële (French pronunciation: [mɔ̃ʒe ɑ̃ ɡɔɛl], lit. 'Montgé in Goële') is a commune in the Seine-et-Marne department in the Île-de-France region in north-central France.

== Demographics ==
Inhabitants are called montgéens.

== See also ==
- Communes of the Seine-et-Marne department
