= Juilly, Seine-et-Marne =

Juilly
- Commune
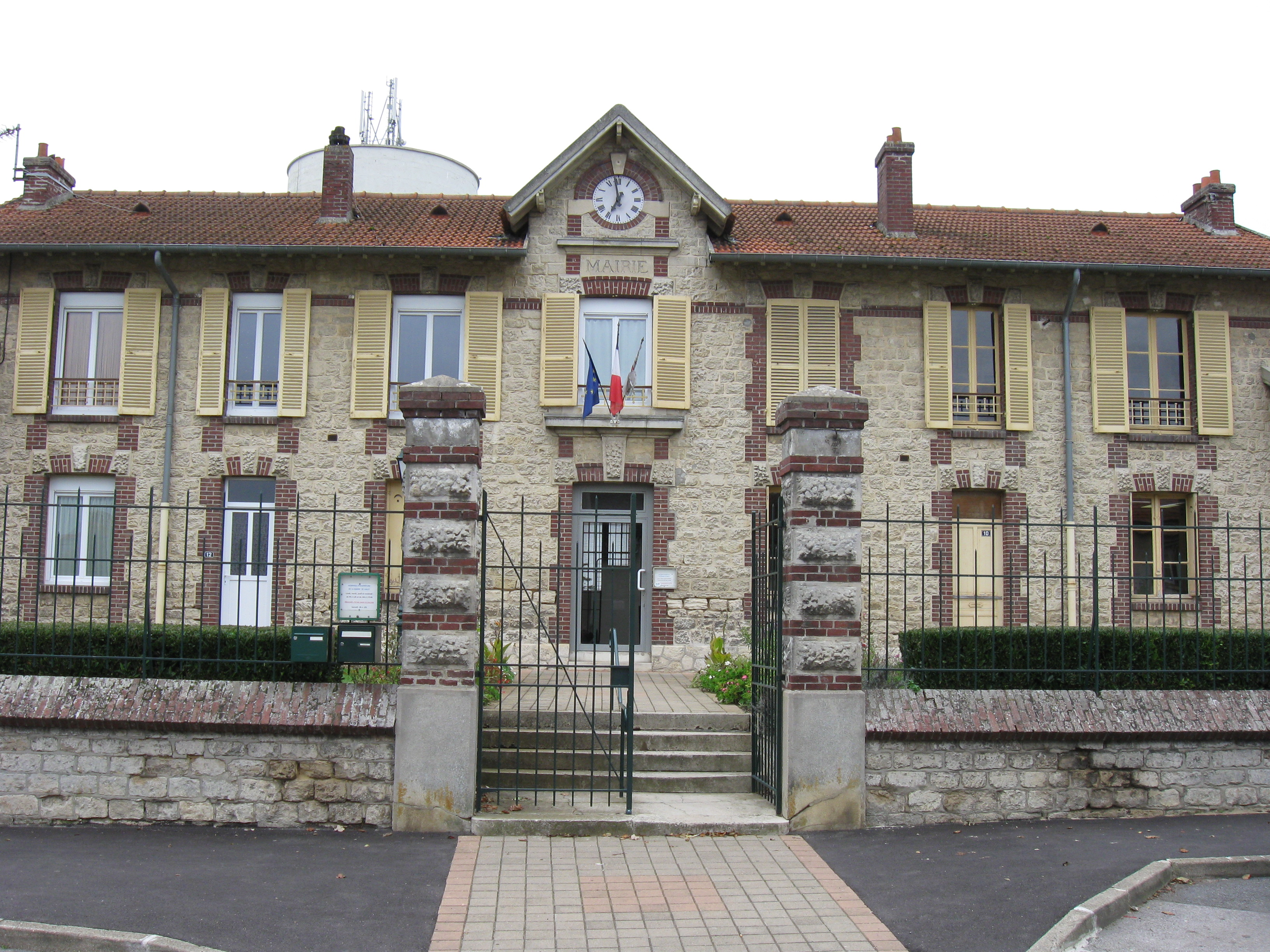
- The town hall of Juilly

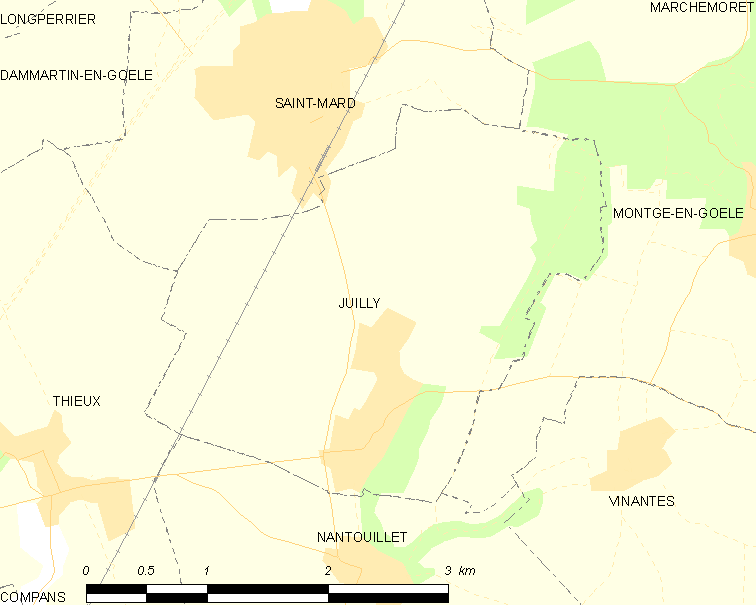
- Location of Juilly
- Location within France Location within Île-de-France (region)
- Coordinates: 49°00′44″N 2°42′19″E
- Country: France
- Region: Île-de-France
- Department: Seine-et-Marne
- Arrondissement: Meaux
- Canton: Mitry-Mory
- Intercommunality: CA Roissy Pays de France

Government
  - Mayor (2020–2026): Daniel Haquin
- Area^{1}: 7.77 km^{2} (3.00 sq mi)
- Highest elevation: 114 m (374 ft)
- Lowest elevation: 77 m (253 ft)
- Population (2023): 2,036
  - Density: 262/km^{2} (679/sq mi)
- Time zone: UTC+01:00 (CET)
  - Summer (DST): UTC+02:00 (CEST)
- INSEE/Postal code: 77241 /77230
- ^{1} French Land Register data, which excludes lakes, ponds, glaciers > 1 km^{2} (0.386 sq mi or 247 acres) and river estuaries.

Juilly (French pronunciation: [ʒɥiji]) is a commune in the Seine-et-Marne département in the Île-de-France region in north-central France. The composer and organist Raphaël Fumet (1898–1979) was born in Juilly

== Population ==
Historical population
Year	Pop.	±% p.a.
1968	798	—
1975	802	+0.07%
1982	1,130	+5.02%
1990	1,288	+1.65%
1999	1,448	+1.31%
2007	1,794	+2.71%
2012	2,205	+4.21%
2017	1,963	−2.30%
2023	2,036	+0.61%
Source: INSEE

Inhabitants are called Juliaciens in French.

== See also ==
- Communes of the Seine-et-Marne department
- College of Juilly
