= Vinantes =

- Commune
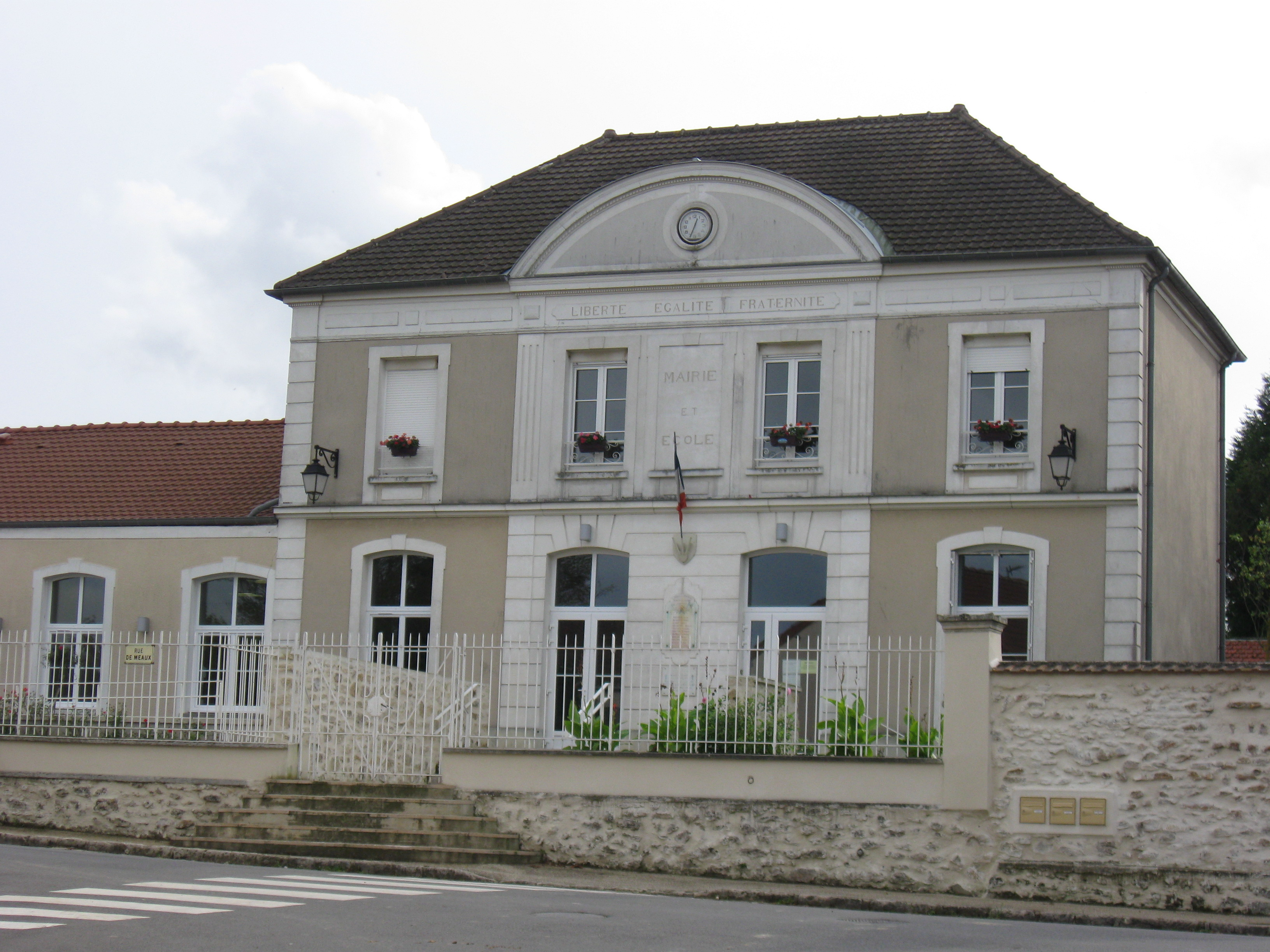
- The town hall in Vinantes
- Location of Vinantes
- Location within France Location within Île-de-France (region)
- Coordinates: 49°00′33″N 2°44′10″E
- Country: France
- Region: Île-de-France
- Department: Seine-et-Marne
- Arrondissement: Meaux
- Canton: Mitry-Mory
- Intercommunality: CC Plaines et Monts de France

Government
  - Mayor (2020–2026): Yves Pelletier
- Area^{1}: 5.27 km^{2} (2.03 sq mi)
- Highest elevation: 122 m (400 ft)
- Lowest elevation: 80 m (260 ft)
- Population (2023): 381
  - Density: 72.3/km^{2} (187/sq mi)
- Time zone: UTC+01:00 (CET)
  - Summer (DST): UTC+02:00 (CEST)
- INSEE/Postal code: 77525 /77230
- ^{1} French Land Register data, which excludes lakes, ponds, glaciers > 1 km^{2} (0.386 sq mi or 247 acres) and river estuaries.

Vinantes (French pronunciation: [vinɑ̃t]) is a commune in the Seine-et-Marne department in the Île-de-France region in north-central France.

== Demographics ==
Inhabitants of Vinantes are called Vinantais.

== See also ==
- Communes of the Seine-et-Marne department
