= John I of Dammartin =

Count of Dammartin

Jean de Trie (c. 1225 – 1298×1304) was the Count of Dammartin (as John I) and lord of Trie and Mouchy (as John II) from 1272.

A member of the House of Trie, John succeeded his father, Mathieu I, on the latter's death in 1272. According to the Chronique Tournaisienne, John died fighting for the king of France at the Battle of the Golden Spurs on 11 July 1302. John had married first Ermengarde, then Yolande, daughter of John I of Dreux. The latter bore him two children: Renaud, who succeeded him prior to May 1304, and Mahaut, who in 1298 married Henry de Vergy (died 1333). Some sources place his death at the Battle of Mons-en-Pévèle on 18 August 1304, but this is after his son Renaud had already become count in May.

He is the same person as the trouvère Jehan de Trie, to whom two surviving chansons courtoises have been attributed. One of these, Bone dame me prie de chanter, is also sometimes attributed to Theobald I of Navarre or Gace Brulé. The other, Li lons consirs et la grans volentés, is undisputed. Both are isometric, decasyllabic, Dorian and set in bar form, and begin with the leading-tone (the seventh degree). At one place in Bone dame there occurs the highly unusual octave leap downwards.

== Bibliography ==
- Claerr, Thierry. "Jean de Trie, comte de Dammartin et poète lyrique du XIII^{e} siècle: est-il le héros du Roman de Jehan de Dammartin et Blonde d'Oxford?" Romania, 117:1–2 (1999), 258–72.
- Courtenay, William J. "Between Pope and King: The Parisian Letters of Adhesion of 1303." Speculum, 71:3 (1996), 577–605.
- Delisle, Léopold Victor. Recherches sur les Comtes de Dammartin Société des antiquaires de France, 1869.
- DeVries, Kelly. "The Use of Chronicles in Creating Medieval Military History". The Journal of Medieval Military History, 2 (2004), 1–16.
- Dyggve, Holger Petersen. Trouvères et protecteurs de trouvères dans les cours seigneuriales de France. Helsinki, 1942.
- Karp, Theodore. "Jehan de Trie." Grove Music Online. Oxford Music Online. Accessed 20 September 2008.
- Morganstern, Anne McGee (2000). Gothic Tombs of Kinship in France, the Low Countries, and England. Penn State University Press.
