= Villeneuve-sous-Dammartin =

- Commune
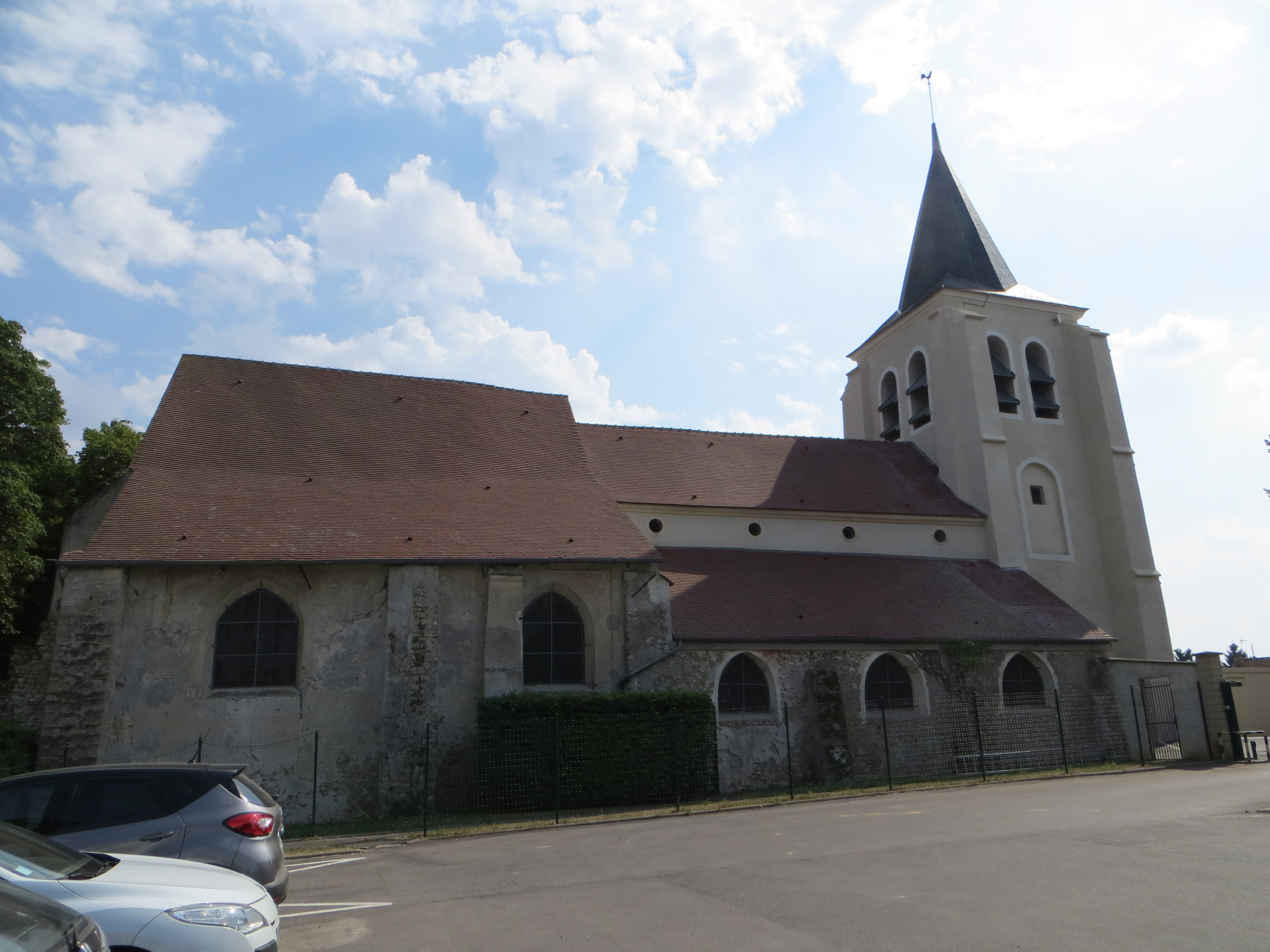
- The church in Villeneuve-sous-Dammartin

- Coat of arms

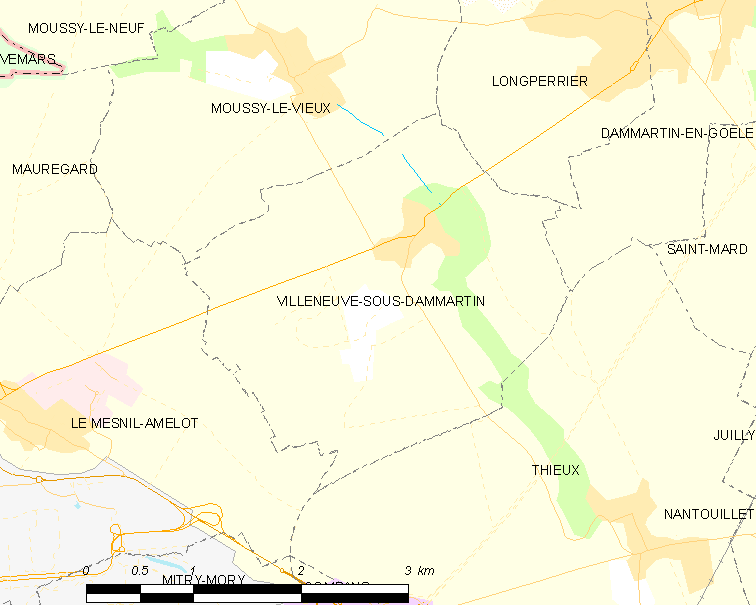
- Location of Villeneuve-sous-Dammartin
- Location within France Location within Île-de-France (region)
- Coordinates: 49°02′00″N 2°38′24″E
- Country: France
- Region: Île-de-France
- Department: Seine-et-Marne
- Arrondissement: Meaux
- Canton: Mitry-Mory
- Intercommunality: CA Roissy Pays de France

Government
  - Mayor (2020–2026): Isabelle Gautier
- Area^{1}: 7.56 km^{2} (2.92 sq mi)
- Highest elevation: 116 m (381 ft)
- Lowest elevation: 72 m (236 ft)
- Population (2023): 595
  - Density: 78.7/km^{2} (204/sq mi)
- Time zone: UTC+01:00 (CET)
  - Summer (DST): UTC+02:00 (CEST)
- INSEE/Postal code: 77511 /77230
- ^{1} French Land Register data, which excludes lakes, ponds, glaciers > 1 km^{2} (0.386 sq mi or 247 acres) and river estuaries.

Villeneuve-sous-Dammartin (French pronunciation: [vilnœv su damaʁtɛ̃]) is a commune in the Seine-et-Marne department in the Île-de-France region in north-central France.

== Demographics ==
Inhabitants of Villeneuve-sous-Dammartin are called Villeneuvois.

== See also ==
- Communes of the Seine-et-Marne department
