= Moussy-le-Vieux =

- Commune
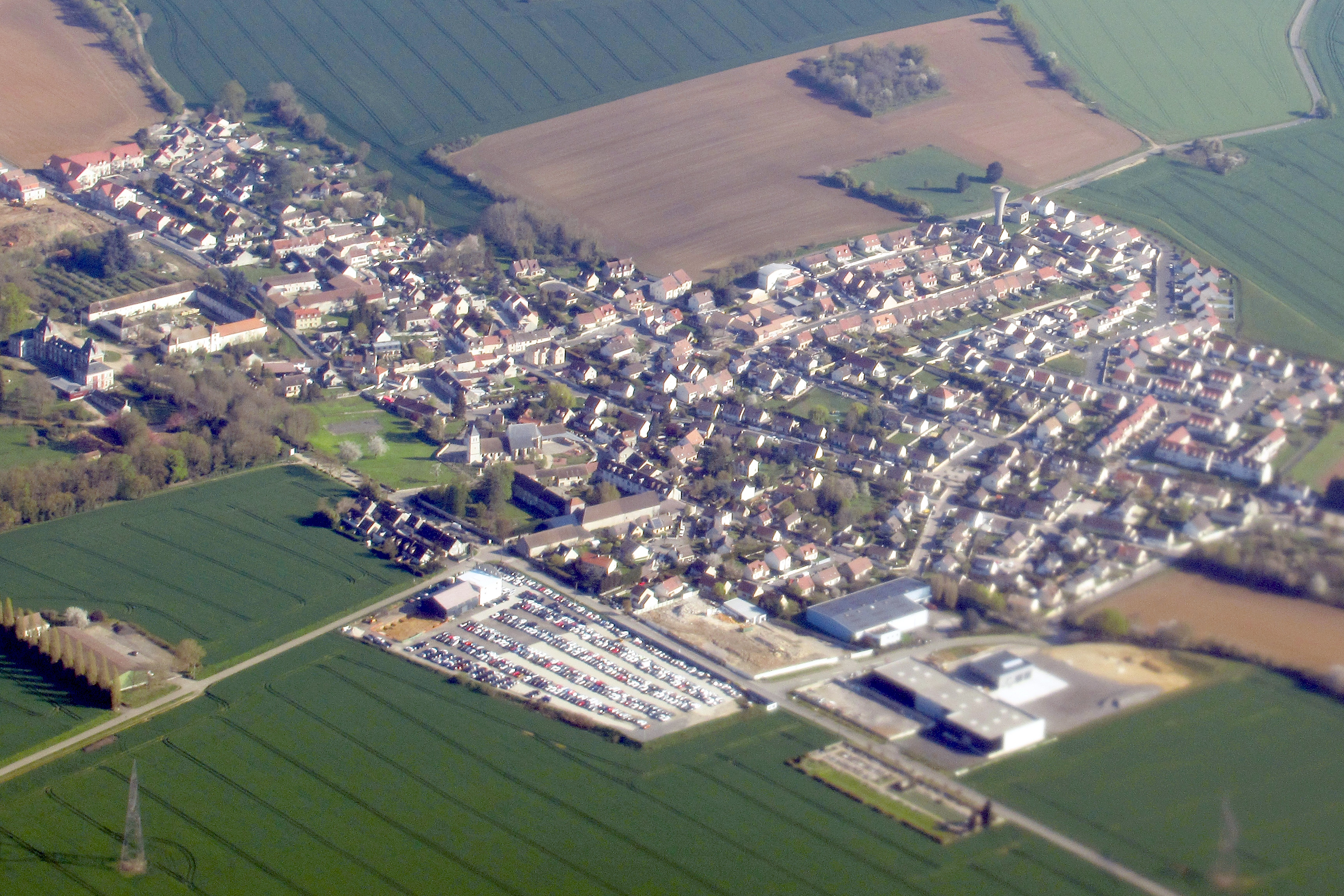
- Aerial view of Moussy-le-Vieux, 2023

- Coat of arms

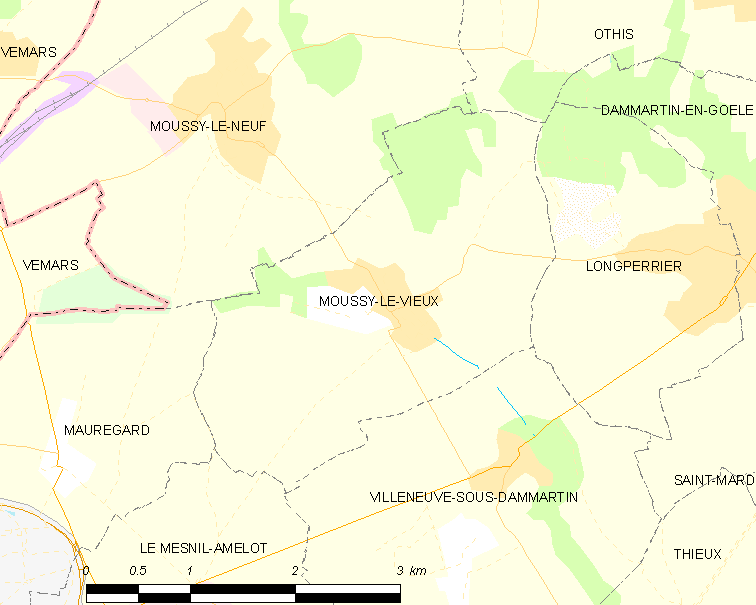
- Location of Moussy-le-Vieux
- Location within France Location within Île-de-France (region)
- Coordinates: 49°02′50″N 2°37′29″E
- Country: France
- Region: Île-de-France
- Department: Seine-et-Marne
- Arrondissement: Meaux
- Canton: Mitry-Mory
- Intercommunality: CA Roissy Pays de France

Government
  - Mayor (2024–2026): Damien Lannette-Claverie
- Area^{1}: 7.19 km^{2} (2.78 sq mi)
- Highest elevation: 131 m (430 ft)
- Lowest elevation: 81 m (266 ft)
- Population (2023): 1,469
  - Density: 204/km^{2} (529/sq mi)
- Time zone: UTC+01:00 (CET)
  - Summer (DST): UTC+02:00 (CEST)
- INSEE/Postal code: 77323 /77230
- ^{1} French Land Register data, which excludes lakes, ponds, glaciers > 1 km^{2} (0.386 sq mi or 247 acres) and river estuaries.

Moussy-le-Vieux (French pronunciation: [musi lə vjø] ）) is a commune in the Seine-et-Marne department in the Île-de-France region in north-central France.

== Demographics ==
Inhabitants are called Moussyssiens.

== See also ==
- Moussy-le-Neuf
- Communes of the Seine-et-Marne department
- Antoine Sartorio
