= Rouvres, Seine-et-Marne =

Rouvres
- Commune
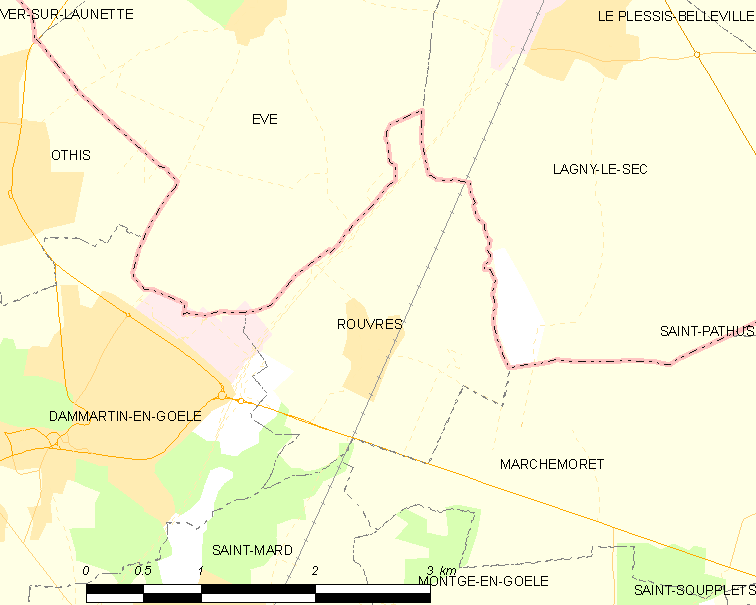
- Location of Rouvres
- Location within France Location within Île-de-France (region)
- Coordinates: 49°03′42″N 2°43′05″E
- Country: France
- Region: Île-de-France
- Department: Seine-et-Marne
- Arrondissement: Meaux
- Canton: Mitry-Mory
- Intercommunality: CA Roissy Pays de France

Government
  - Mayor (2020–2026): Eric Journaux
- Area^{1}: 4.14 km^{2} (1.60 sq mi)
- Highest elevation: 146 m (479 ft)
- Lowest elevation: 98 m (322 ft)
- Population (2023): 1,038
  - Density: 251/km^{2} (649/sq mi)
- Time zone: UTC+01:00 (CET)
  - Summer (DST): UTC+02:00 (CEST)
- INSEE/Postal code: 77392 /77230
- ^{1} French Land Register data, which excludes lakes, ponds, glaciers > 1 km^{2} (0.386 sq mi or 247 acres) and river estuaries.

Rouvres (French pronunciation: [ʁuvʁ]) is a commune in the Seine-et-Marne department in the Île-de-France region in north-central France.

== Demographics ==
Inhabitants of Rouvres are called Rouvrésiens.

== See also ==
- Communes of the Seine-et-Marne department
