= Mauregard =

- Commune
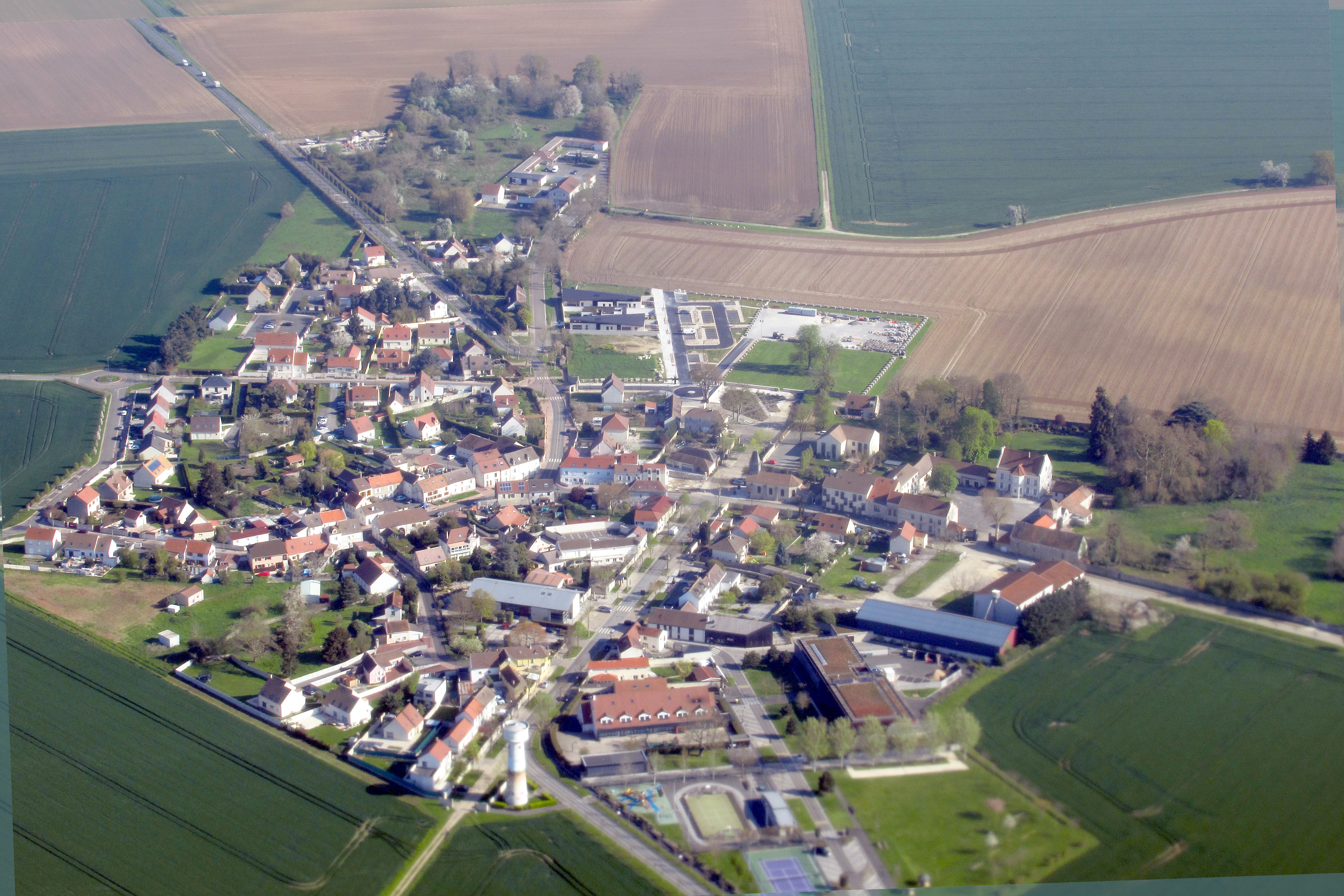
- An aerial view of Mauregard

- Coat of arms
- Location of Mauregard
- Location within France Location within Île-de-France (region)
- Coordinates: 49°02′00″N 2°34′52″E
- Country: France
- Region: Île-de-France
- Department: Seine-et-Marne
- Arrondissement: Meaux
- Canton: Mitry-Mory
- Intercommunality: CA Roissy Pays de France

Government
  - Mayor (2020–2026): Madeleine Latour
- Area^{1}: 8.67 km^{2} (3.35 sq mi)
- Highest elevation: 126 m (413 ft)
- Lowest elevation: 98 m (322 ft)
- Population (2023): 341
  - Density: 39.3/km^{2} (102/sq mi)
- Time zone: UTC+01:00 (CET)
  - Summer (DST): UTC+02:00 (CEST)
- INSEE/Postal code: 77282 /77990
- ^{1} French Land Register data, which excludes lakes, ponds, glaciers > 1 km^{2} (0.386 sq mi or 247 acres) and river estuaries.

Mauregard (French pronunciation: [moʁɡaʁ]) is a commune in the Seine-et-Marne department in the Île-de-France region in north-central France.

Parts of the Charles de Gaulle International Airport (France's largest and busiest airport) are located in Mauregard, including Terminal 1 and Terminal 3. The large airport property (over 8,000 acres (3,200 ha)) straddles land in three départements and six communes, with the Roissy-en-France commune providing its alternate name of Roissy Airport.

== Demographics ==
Inhabitants are called Mauregaulois.

== Education ==
There is a single preschool and elementary school, Ecole de Mauregard.

== See also ==
- Communes of the Seine-et-Marne department
