= Othis =

- Commune
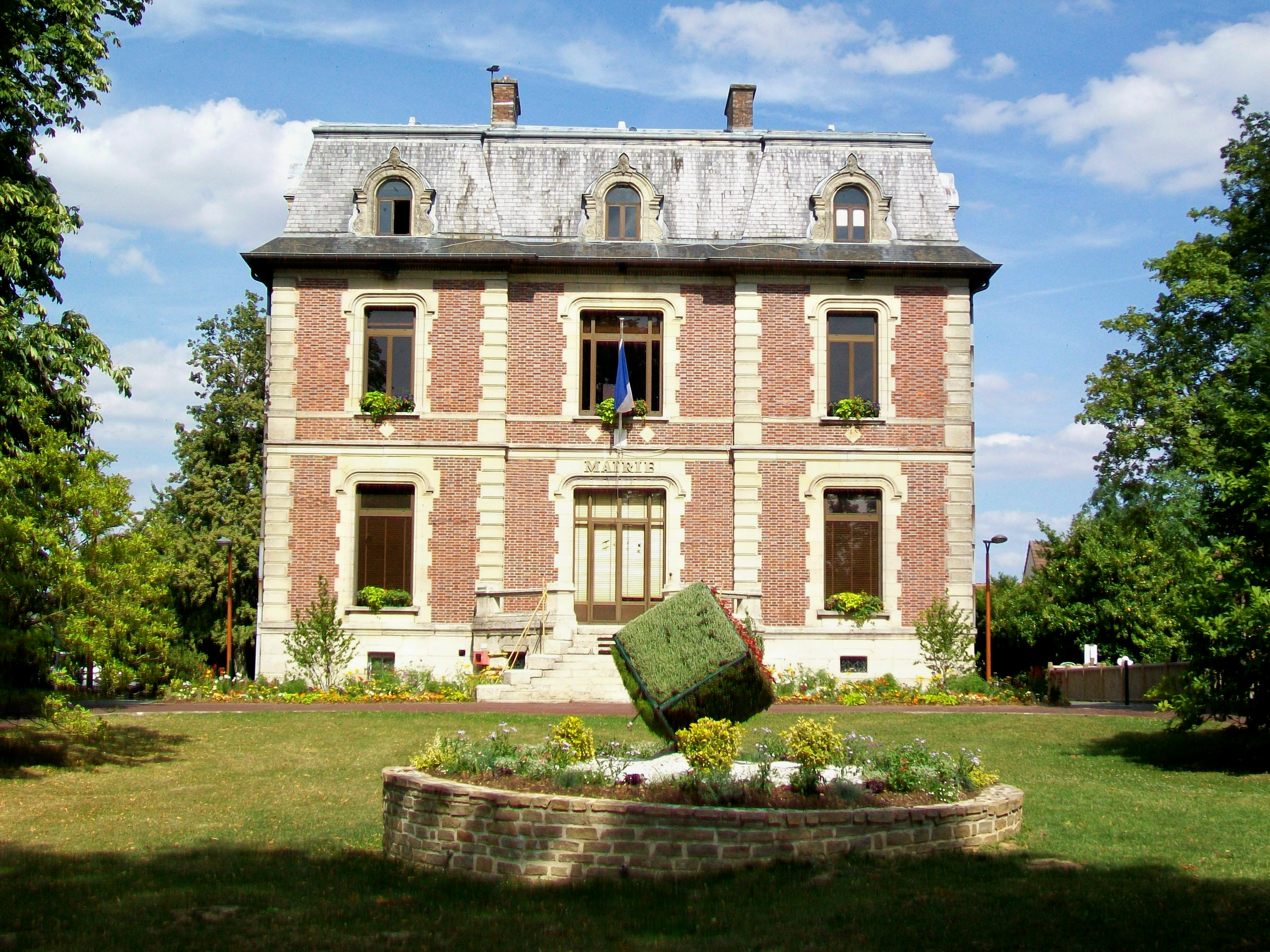
- The town hall of Othis

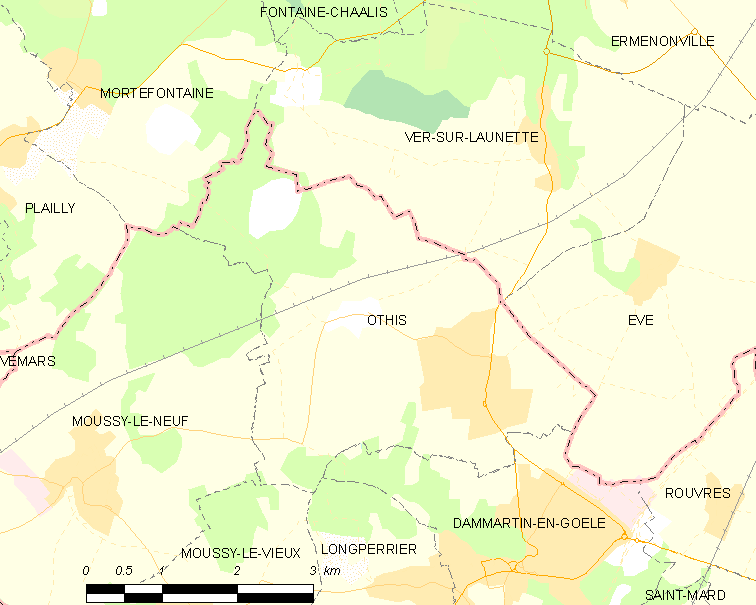
- Location of Othis
- Location within France Location within Île-de-France (region)
- Coordinates: 49°04′27″N 2°40′30″E
- Country: France
- Region: Île-de-France
- Department: Seine-et-Marne
- Arrondissement: Meaux
- Canton: Mitry-Mory
- Intercommunality: CA Roissy Pays de France

Government
  - Mayor (2024–2026): Viviane Didier
- Area^{1}: 13.04 km^{2} (5.03 sq mi)
- Highest elevation: 155 m (509 ft)
- Lowest elevation: 94 m (308 ft)
- Population (2023): 6,717
  - Density: 515.1/km^{2} (1,334/sq mi)
- Time zone: UTC+01:00 (CET)
  - Summer (DST): UTC+02:00 (CEST)
- INSEE/Postal code: 77349 /77280
- ^{1} French Land Register data, which excludes lakes, ponds, glaciers > 1 km^{2} (0.386 sq mi or 247 acres) and river estuaries.

Othis (French: [ɔtis]) is a commune in the Seine-et-Marne department in the Île-de-France region in north-central France.

== Demographics ==
Inhabitants are called Othissois in French.

Historical population
Year	Pop.	±% p.a.
1968	260	—
1975	3,343	+44.03%
1982	5,099	+6.22%
1990	5,591	+1.16%
1999	6,479	+1.65%
2007	6,501	+0.04%
2012	6,459	−0.13%
2017	6,680	+0.68%
2023	6,717	+0.09%
Source: INSEE

== See also ==
- Communes of the Seine-et-Marne department
- Mayor Mauricia Coquiot
