= Le Mesnil-Amelot =

- Commune
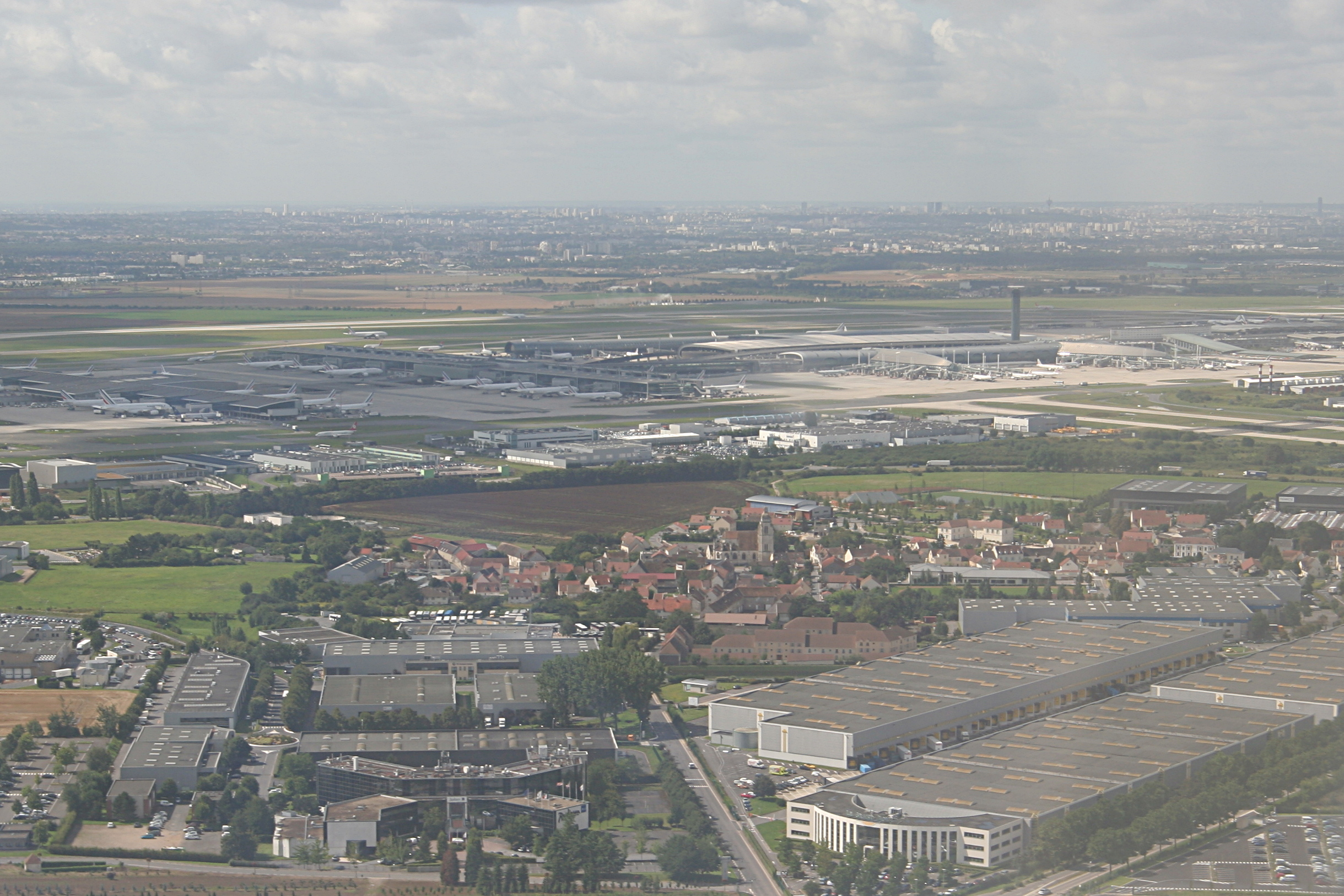
- Aerial view

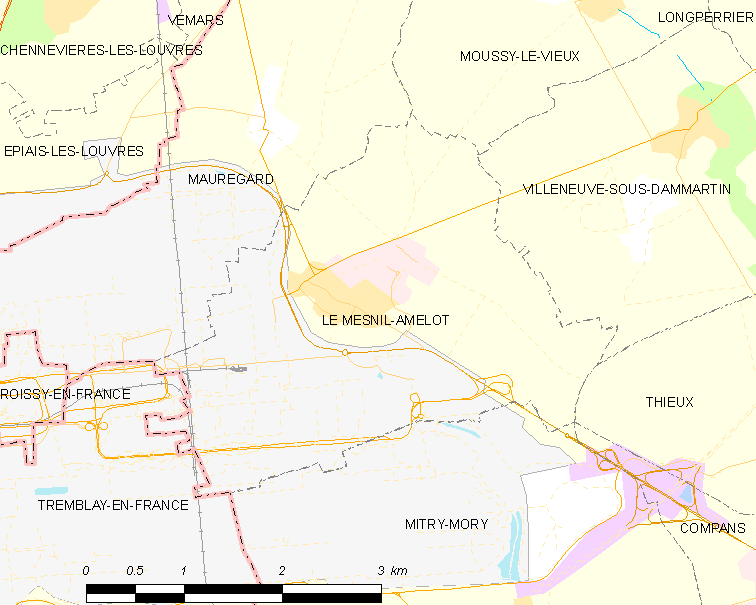
- Location of Le Mesnil-Amelot
- Location within France Location within Île-de-France (region)
- Coordinates: 49°01′06″N 2°35′41″E
- Country: France
- Region: Île-de-France
- Department: Seine-et-Marne
- Arrondissement: Meaux
- Canton: Mitry-Mory
- Intercommunality: CA Roissy Pays de France

Government
  - Mayor (2020–2026): Alain Aubry
- Area^{1}: 9.84 km^{2} (3.80 sq mi)
- Highest elevation: 121 m (397 ft)
- Lowest elevation: 87 m (285 ft)
- Population (2023): 992
  - Density: 101/km^{2} (261/sq mi)
- Time zone: UTC+01:00 (CET)
  - Summer (DST): UTC+02:00 (CEST)
- INSEE/Postal code: 77291 /77990
- ^{1} French Land Register data, which excludes lakes, ponds, glaciers > 1 km^{2} (0.386 sq mi or 247 acres) and river estuaries.

Le Mesnil-Amelot (French pronunciation: [lə menil amlo]) is a commune in the Seine-et-Marne département in the Île-de-France region in north-central France. A large portion of Charles de Gaulle Airport is situated on Le Mesnil-Amelot's territory.

== Demographics ==
Its inhabitants are called Mesnilois.

== Education ==
There is one primary school in the community, Ecole publique Saint-Exupéry. Its current location opened in January 2008.

== See also ==
- Communes of the Seine-et-Marne department
