= Agglomeration community of Marne et Chantereine =

Coordinates: 48.8787°N 2.5949°E

Marne et Chantereine
- Former communauté d'agglomération
- Country: France
- Region: Île-de-France
- Department: Seine-et-Marne
- No. of communes: {{{nbcomm}}}
- Established: 2009
- Disbanded: 2016
- Area: 30.76 km^{2} (11.88 sq mi)
- Population (2008): 74,972
  - Density: 2,437/km^{2} (6,313/sq mi)

The Communauté d'agglomération de Marne et Chantereine is a former federation of municipalities (communauté d'agglomération) in the Seine-et-Marne département and in the Île-de-France région of France. It was created in January 2009. It was merged into the Communauté d'agglomération Paris - Vallée de la Marne in January 2016.

== Composition ==
The Communauté d'agglomération de Marne et Chantereine comprised 4 communes:

- Brou-sur-Chantereine
- Chelles
- Courtry
- Vaires-sur-Marne

== See also ==
- Communes of the Seine-et-Marne department
