= Canton of Villeparisis =

Coordinates: 48°58′27″N 2°43′37″E

Villeparisis
- Canton
- Country: France
- Region: Île-de-France
- Department: Seine-et-Marne
- No. of communes: {{{nbcomm}}}
- Area: 39.43 km^{2} (15.22 sq mi)
- Population (2023): 57,065
  - Density: 1,447/km^{2} (3,748/sq mi)
- INSEE code: 77 23

The canton of Villeparisis is a French administrative division, located in the arrondissement of Torcy, in the Seine-et-Marne département (Île-de-France région).

== Composition ==
Following the French canton reorganisation which came into effect in March 2015, the composition of the canton of Villeparisis is:

- Brou-sur-Chantereine
- Courtry
- Le Pin
- Vaires-sur-Marne
- Villeparisis
- Villevaudé

== Adjacent cantons ==
- Canton of Mitry-Mory (north)
- Canton of Claye-Souilly (northeast)
- Canton of Lagny-sur-Marne (east)
- Canton of Chelles (west)
- Canton of Torcy (southeast)
- Canton of Champs-sur-Marne (south)

== See also ==
- Cantons of the Seine-et-Marne department
- Communes of the Seine-et-Marne department
