= Champs-sur-Marne =

- Commune
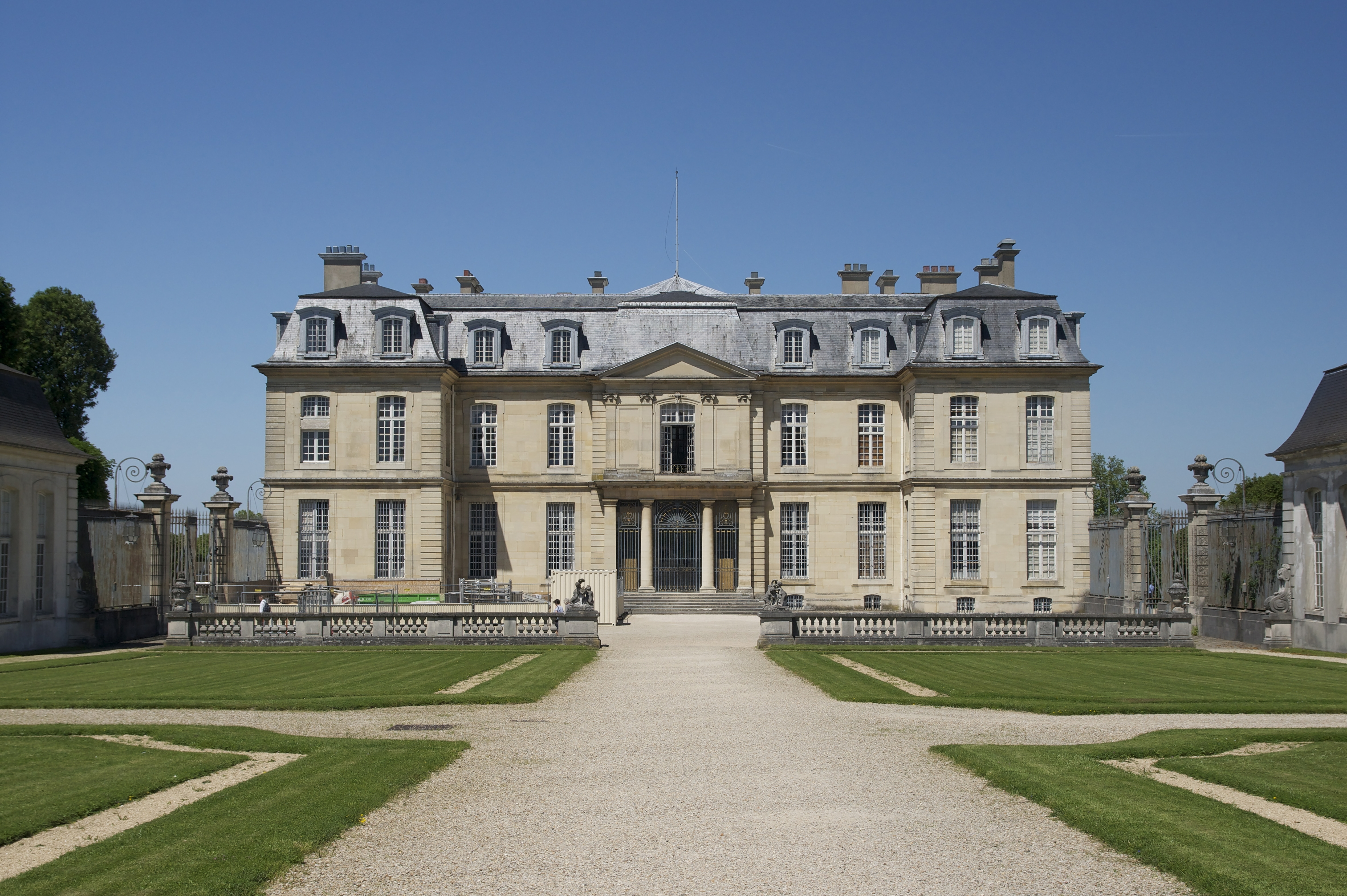
- Château de Champs-sur-Marne

- Coat of arms

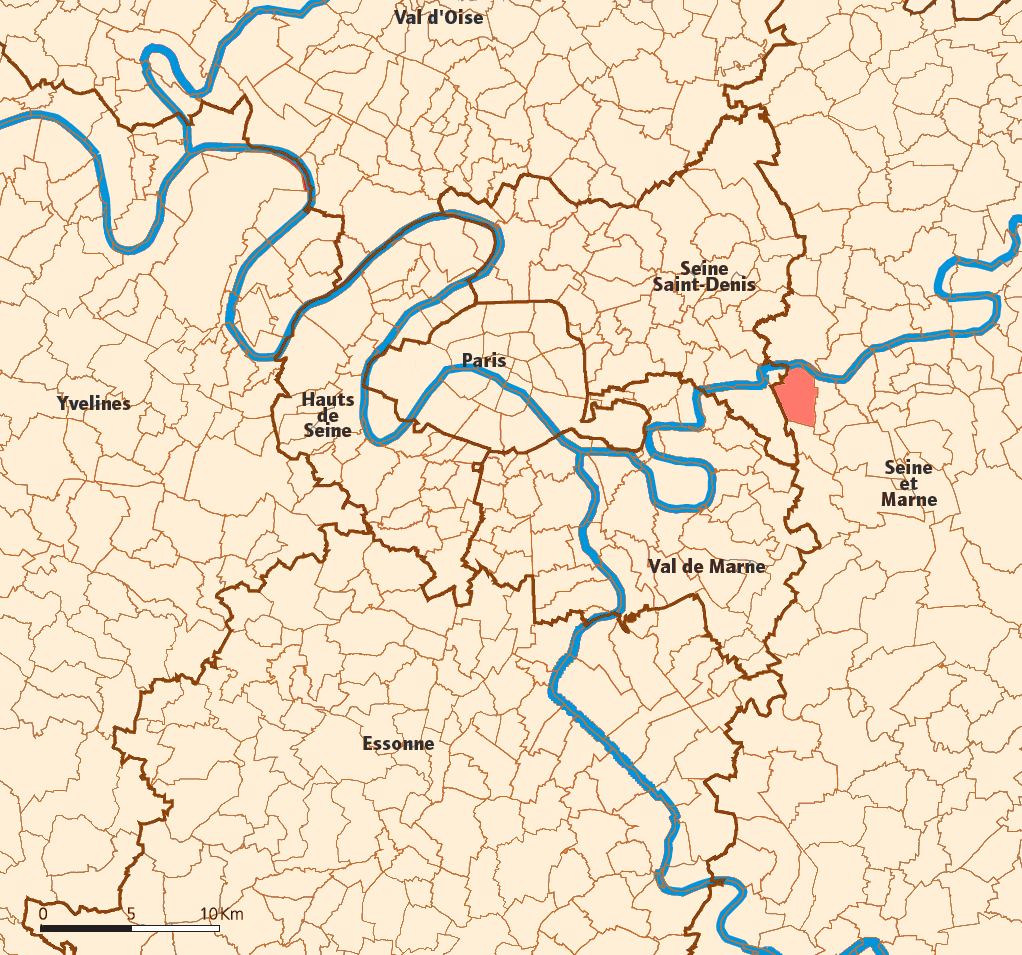
- Location (in red) within Paris inner and outer suburbs
- Location of Champs-sur-Marne
- Location within France Location within Île-de-France (region)
- Coordinates: 48°51′10″N 2°36′10″E
- Country: France
- Region: Île-de-France
- Department: Seine-et-Marne
- Arrondissement: Torcy
- Canton: Champs-sur-Marne
- Intercommunality: CA Paris - Vallée de la Marne

Government
  - Mayor (2020–2026): Maud Tallet
- Area^{1}: 7.35 km^{2} (2.84 sq mi)
- Highest elevation: 106 m (348 ft)
- Lowest elevation: 38 m (125 ft)
- Population (2023): 27,451
  - Density: 3,730/km^{2} (9,670/sq mi)
- Time zone: UTC+01:00 (CET)
  - Summer (DST): UTC+02:00 (CEST)
- INSEE/Postal code: 77083 /77420
- Website: ville-champssurmarne.fr
- ^{1} French Land Register data, which excludes lakes, ponds, glaciers > 1 km^{2} (0.386 sq mi or 247 acres) and river estuaries.

Champs-sur-Marne (French pronunciation: [ʃɑ̃ syʁ maʁn]; lit. 'Fields-on-Marne') is a commune in the eastern outer suburbs of Paris, France. It is located 18.2 km (11.3 mi) from the centre of Paris, on the left bank of the Marne, in the Seine-et-Marne department (on the departmental border with Seine-Saint-Denis) in the Île-de-France region.

The commune of Champs-sur-Marne, famous for its château, is part of the Val Maubuée area, one of the four sectors in the "new town" of Marne-la-Vallée.

== History ==
Originally called simply Champs, the name of the commune became officially Champs-sur-Marne (meaning "Fields upon Marne") on 9 April 1962. The Hôtel de Ville was completed in 2002.

== Demographics ==
The inhabitants are often referred to as Campésiens in French. The term Champesois is also in use.

Historical population

Year	Pop.	±% p.a.
1793	333	—
1800	303	−1.34%
1806	315	+0.65%
1821	330	+0.31%
1831	455	+3.26%
1836	522	+2.79%
1841	443	−3.23%
1846	493	+2.16%
1851	445	−2.03%
1856	494	+2.11%
1861	580	+3.26%
1866	700	+3.83%
1872	710	+0.24%
1876	813	+3.44%
1881	929	+2.70%
1886	1,106	+3.55%
1891	1,356	+4.16%
1896	1,558	+2.82%
1901	1,633	+0.94%

Year	Pop.	±% p.a.
1906	1,786	+1.81%
1911	1,797	+0.12%
1921	1,580	−1.28%
1926	1,674	+1.16%
1931	2,162	+5.25%
1936	2,622	+3.93%
1946	2,310	−1.26%
1954	2,918	+2.96%
1962	3,793	+3.33%
1968	4,446	+2.68%
1975	5,095	+1.97%
1982	16,739	+18.52%
1990	21,611	+3.24%
1999	24,553	+1.43%
2007	24,333	−0.11%
2012	24,663	+0.27%
2017	25,041	+0.30%
2023	27,451	+1.54%

Source: EHESS and INSEE (1968–2023)

== Twin towns – sister cities ==
Champs-sur-Marne is twinned with:

- Bradley Stoke, England, United Kingdom
- Quart de Poblet, Spain

== Transport ==
Champs-sur-Marne is served by Noisy – Champs station on Paris RER line.

== Education ==
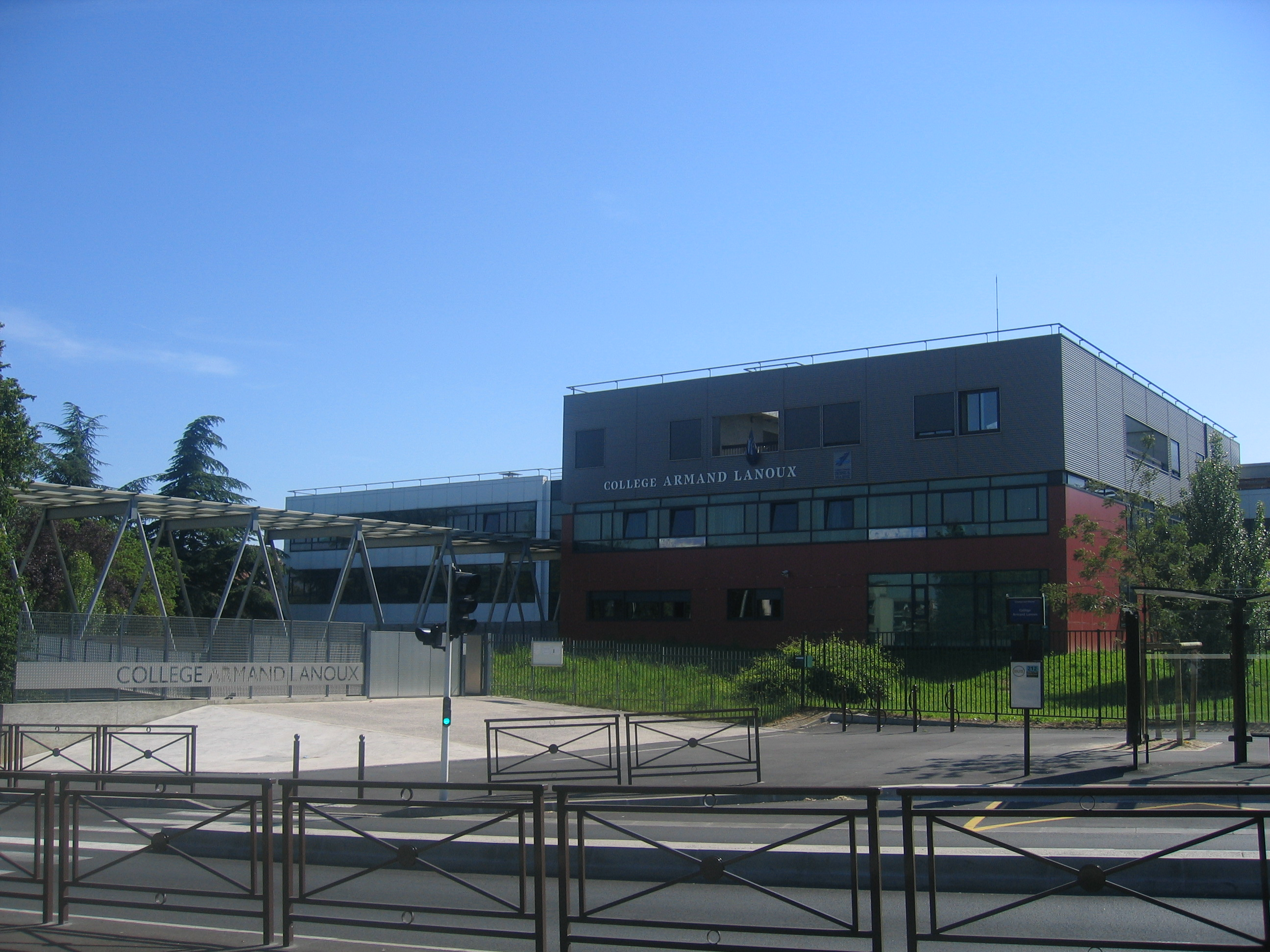
Collège Armand Lanoux, one of three junior high schools in the commune

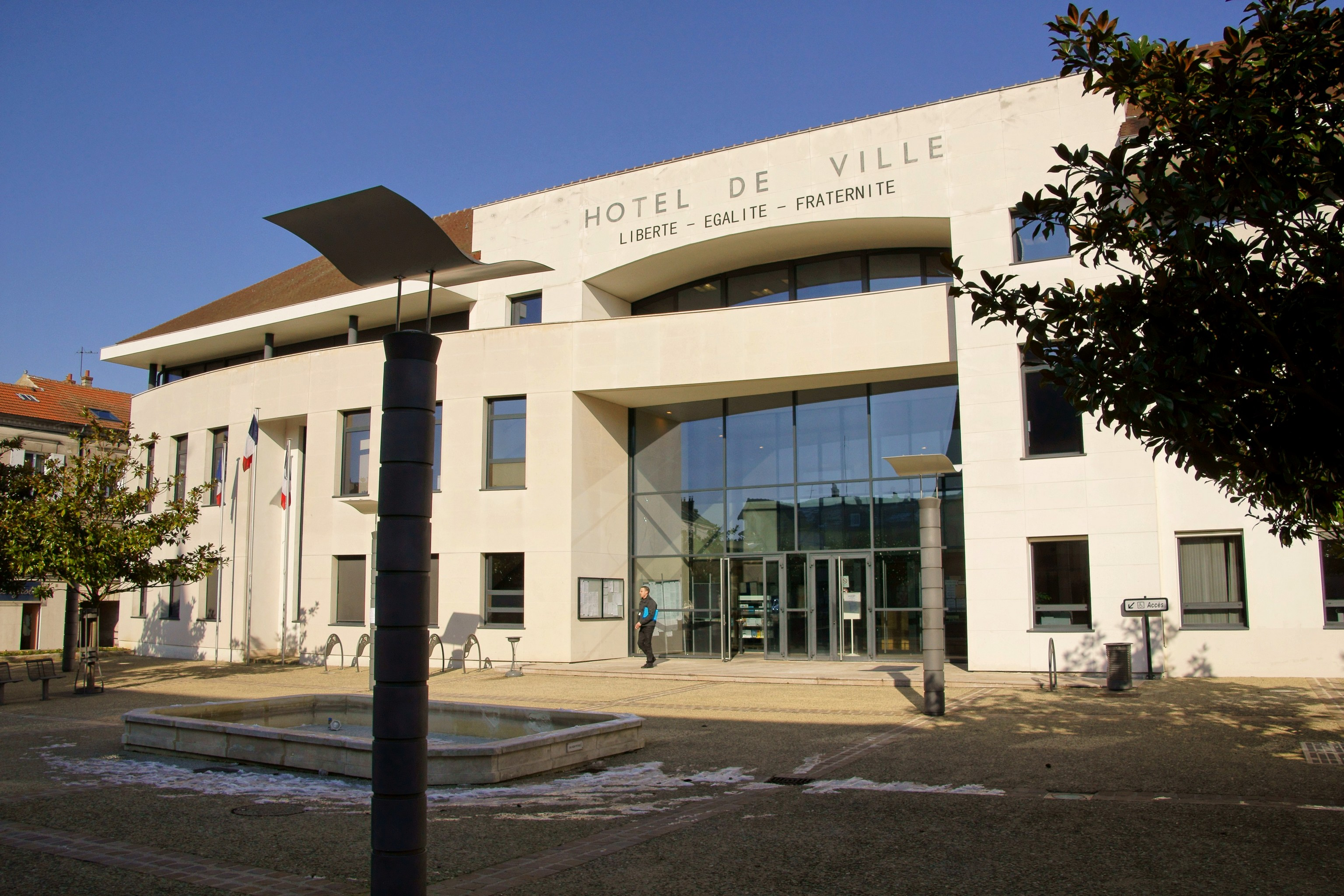
The Hôtel de Ville

As of 2016 the commune has ten preschools with 1,138 students combined, and ten elementary schools with 1,729 students combined.

The commune has three junior high schools, Armand Lanoux, Jean Weiner, and Pablo Picasso; and there is an additional junior high school in a surrounding commune, Le Luzard in Noisiel. There are 1,799 junior high school students combined. The commune has one senior high school, Lycée René Descartes.

Nearby senior high schools:

- Lycée Gérard de Nerval (Noisiel)
- Lycée technique René Cassin (Noisiel)
- Lycée Jean Moulin (Torcy)

There are also vocational high schools in Chelles, Thorigny, and Torcy.

Tertiary education:

- École des ponts ParisTech

== See also ==
- Communes of the Seine-et-Marne department
