= Pontault-Combault =

- Commune
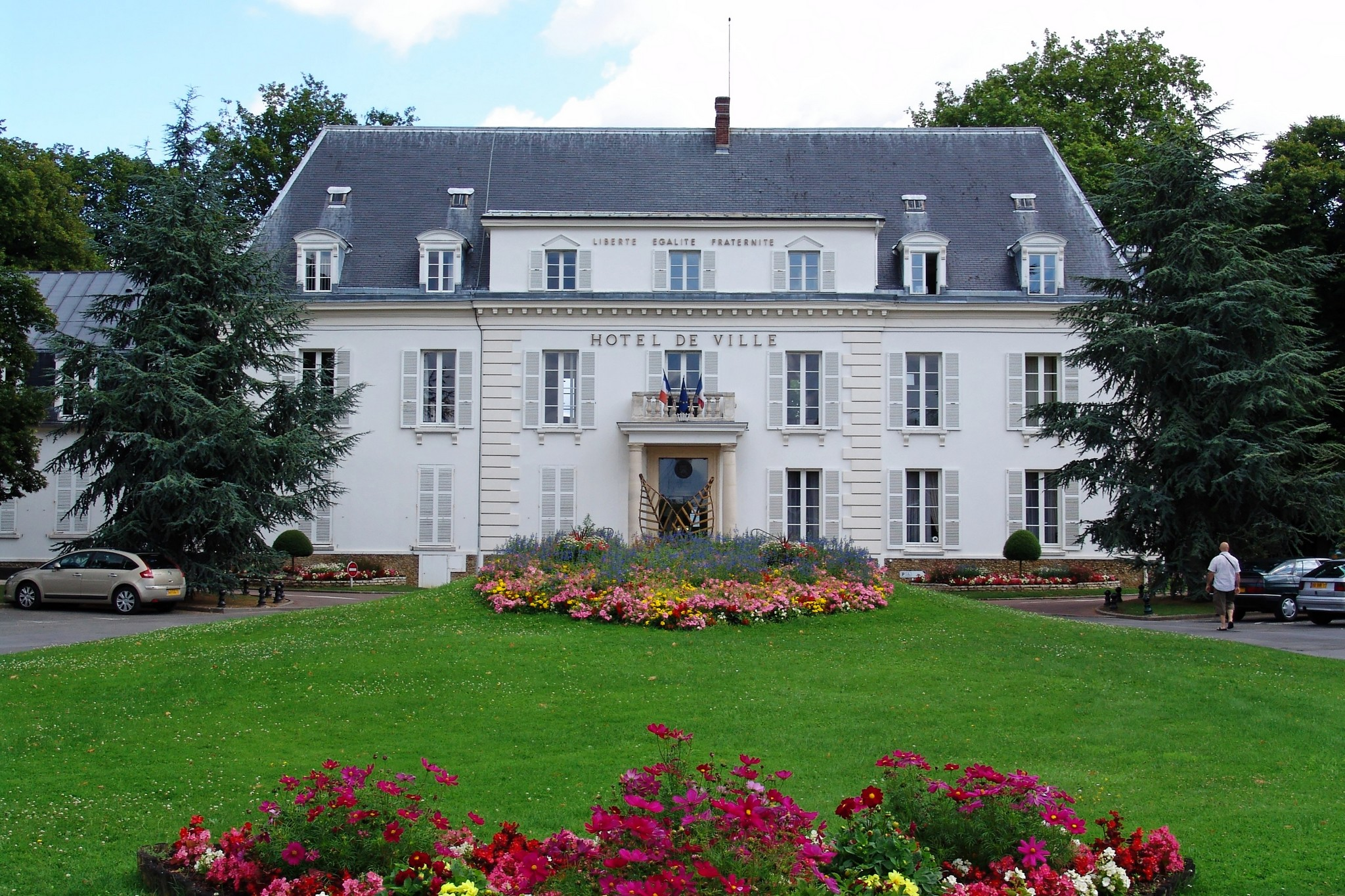
- The Hôtel de Ville

- Coat of arms

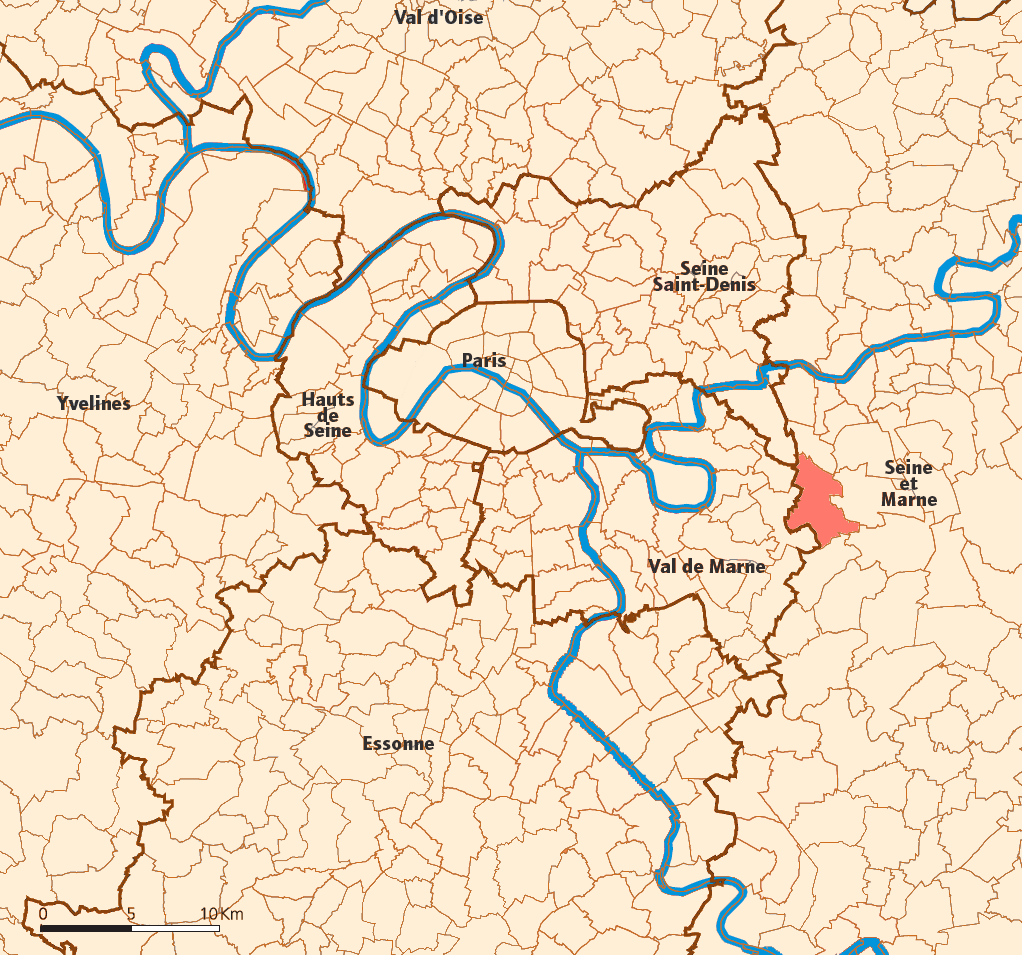
- Location (in red) within Paris inner and outer suburbs
- Location of Pontault-Combault
- Location within France Location within Île-de-France (region)
- Coordinates: 48°48′05″N 2°36′27″E
- Country: France
- Region: Île-de-France
- Department: Seine-et-Marne
- Arrondissement: Torcy
- Canton: Pontault-Combault
- Intercommunality: CA Paris - Vallée de la Marne

Government
  - Mayor (2020–2026): Gilles Bord (PS)
- Area^{1}: 13.64 km^{2} (5.27 sq mi)
- Highest elevation: 113 m (371 ft)
- Lowest elevation: 87 m (285 ft)
- Population (2023): 39,096
  - Density: 2,866/km^{2} (7,424/sq mi)
- Demonym: Ponto-Combalusiens or Pontellois-Combalusiens (fr)
- Time zone: UTC+01:00 (CET)
  - Summer (DST): UTC+02:00 (CEST)
- INSEE/Postal code: 77373 /77340
- ^{1} French Land Register data, which excludes lakes, ponds, glaciers > 1 km^{2} (0.386 sq mi or 247 acres) and river estuaries.

Pontault-Combault (French pronunciation: [pɔ̃to kɔ̃bo]) is a commune in the Seine-et-Marne department in the Île-de-France region in north-central France. It is located in the eastern suburbs of Paris, 19.8 km (12.3 mi) from the center of Paris.

== History ==
The commune of Pontault-Combault was created in 1839 by the merger of the commune of Pontault with the commune of Combault. The Hôtel de Ville, which is located in Combault, was completed in the 18th century.

Before this merger, the commune of Pontault had already annexed the commune of Berchères at the time of the French Revolution.

== Transport ==
Pontault-Combault is served by Émerainville–Pontault-Combault station on Paris.

== Demographics ==
The inhabitants are called Pontellois-Combalusiens in French.

Historical population

Year	Pop.	±% p.a.
1793	417	—
1821	426	+0.08%
1846	550	+1.03%
1872	620	+0.46%
1901	726	+0.55%
1921	952	+1.36%
1926	2,240	+18.66%
1931	3,566	+9.75%
1936	4,124	+2.95%
1946	3,129	−2.72%
1954	4,552	+4.80%

Year	Pop.	±% p.a.
1962	7,465	+6.38%
1968	9,282	+3.70%
1975	16,761	+8.81%
1982	19,037	+1.84%
1990	26,804	+4.37%
1999	32,886	+2.30%
2007	34,733	+0.69%
2012	37,631	+1.62%
2017	37,747	+0.06%
2023	39,096	+0.59%

Source: EHESS and INSEE (1968-2023)

== See also ==
- Communes of the Seine-et-Marne department
