= Cantons of the Seine-et-Marne department =

The following is a list of the 23 cantons of the Seine-et-Marne department, in France, following the French canton reorganisation which came into effect in March 2015:

- Champs-sur-Marne
- Chelles
- Claye-Souilly
- Combs-la-Ville
- Coulommiers
- La Ferté-sous-Jouarre
- Fontainebleau
- Fontenay-Trésigny
- Lagny-sur-Marne
- Meaux
- Melun
- Mitry-Mory
- Montereau-Fault-Yonne
- Nangis
- Nemours
- Ozoir-la-Ferrière
- Pontault-Combault
- Provins
- Saint-Fargeau-Ponthierry
- Savigny-le-Temple
- Serris
- Torcy
- Villeparisis
