= Hôtel de Ville, Pontault-Combault =

Town hall in Pontault-Combault, France

Hôtel de Ville
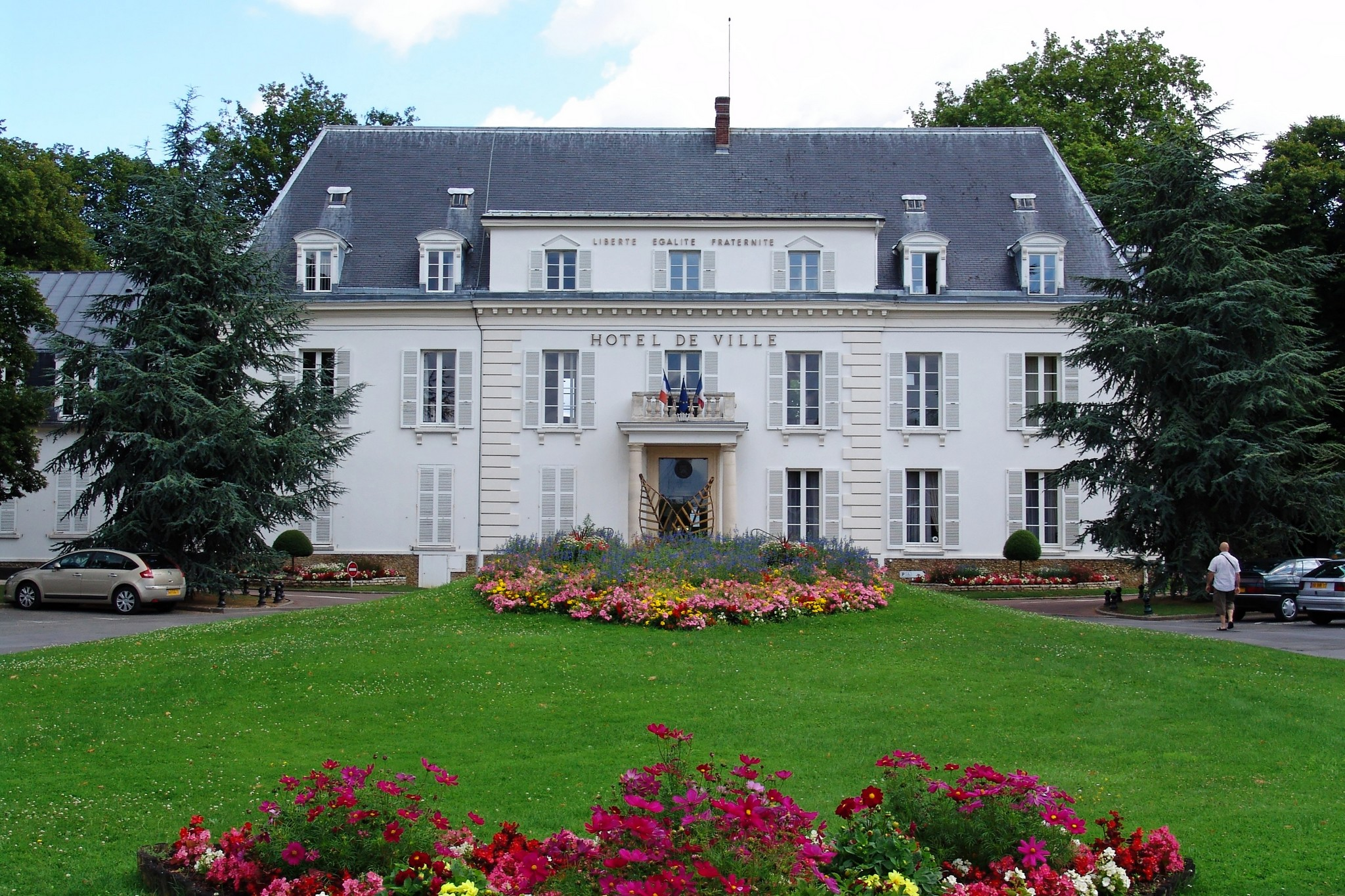
- The main frontage of the Hôtel de Ville in November 2009
- Interactive map of the Hôtel de Ville area

General information
- Type: City hall
- Architectural style: Neoclassical style
- Location: Pontault-Combault, France
- Coordinates: 48.8015°N 2.6077°E
- Completed: c.1490

The Hôtel de Ville (French pronunciation: [otɛl də vil], City Hall) is a municipal building in Pontault-Combault, Seine-Saint-Denis, in the eastern suburbs of Paris, standing on Avenue de la République.

== History ==
=== The old town hall ===
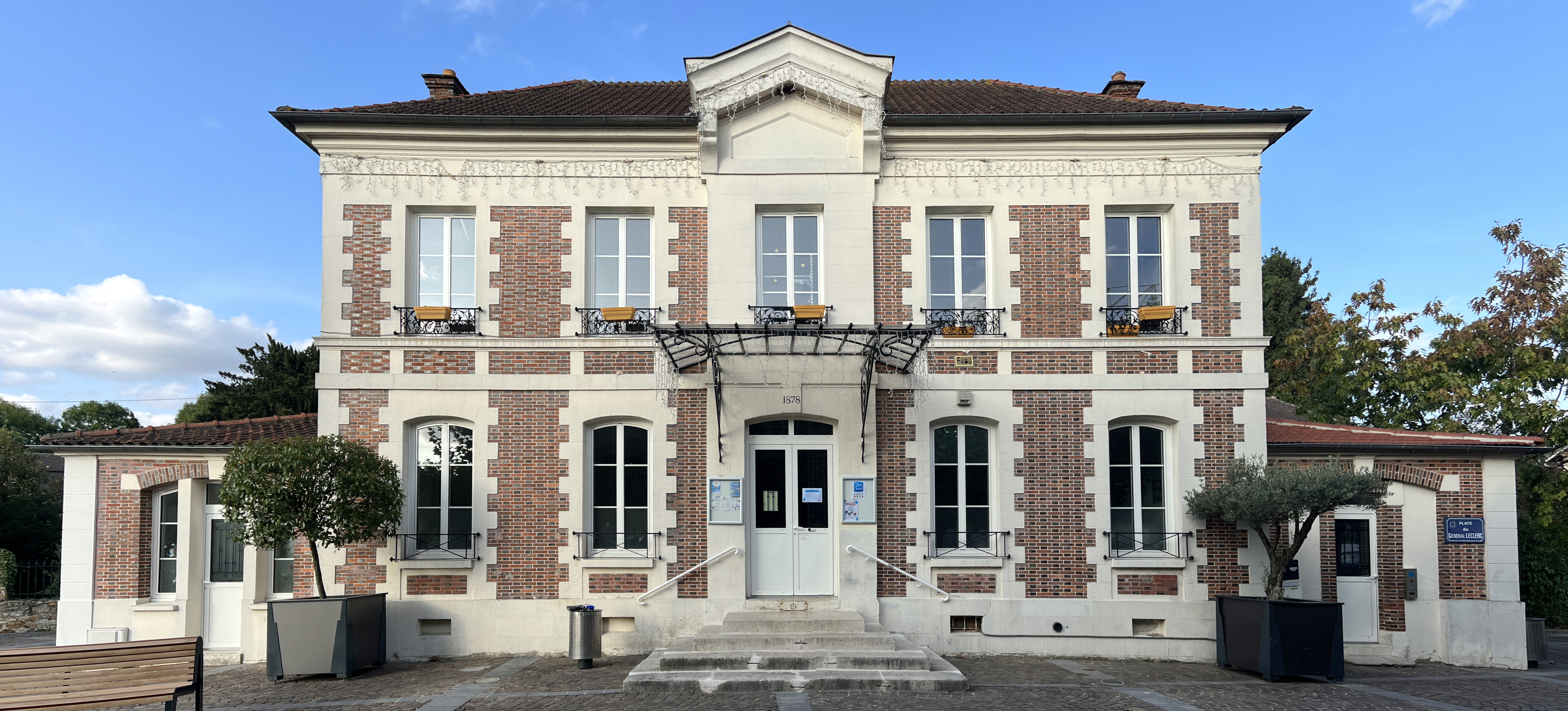
The old town hall

Following the French Revolution, the town councils of Pontault and Combault initially met at the homes of the respective mayors at the time. After the combination of the two communes in 1839, the combined town council met in a schoolroom attached to the Church of Saint-Denis. In 1857, after finding this arrangement unsatisfactory, the council led by the mayor, Charles Marie de Rosset de Letourville, decided to commission a dedicated town hall. The site they selected was just to the east of the Church of Saint-Denis, on the north side of what is now Place du Général-Leclerc. The site, which was occupied by a house and a farm, was acquired from Pierre Jacques Miquelard in 1872. Work on the new building started in November 1877. It was designed by Sieur Duval in the neoclassical style, built by Messieurs Perrin and Quinard in red brick with stone dressings and was completed in 1878.

The design involved a symmetrical main frontage of five bays facing onto the square. The central bay featured a square-headed doorway with a stone surround. The other bays on the ground floor were fenestrated with segmental-headed casement windows with stone surrounds and the windows on the first floor were fenestrated with square-headed casement windows with stone surrounds. At roof level, there was an entablature and an open pediment above the central bay.

=== Château de Combault ===
In the 1960s, following significant population growth, the town council led by the mayor, Robert Pestel, decided to acquire a more substantial building for municipal use. The building they selected was the Château de Combault on Avenue de la République. This building had served as the seat of the local seigneur. The seigneurs of Combault dated back to the 12th century. Robert de Combeaux was the local seigneur in 1145. The current building dates back at least to the late 15th century as significant work was commissioned there by the future Bishop of Paris, Jean-Simon de Champigny, when he was the seigneur of Combault in 1490. In the late 17th century, the château was acquired by Guillaume Doé, who was secretary to Louis XIV, and it then passed down his family.

The château was remodelled in the mid-18th century. The design involved a symmetrical main frontage of seven bays facing onto Avenue de la République. The central section of three bays, which was slightly projected forward, featured a porch formed by a pair of Doric order columns supporting an entablature. There were quoins at the edges of the central section. The building was fenestrated by casement windows with shutters on two floors and there were dormer windows at attic level.

During the French Revolution, the château was occupied by the last seigneur to live there, François Charles de Saint-Hilaire. In 1802, Saint-Hilaire sold the château to Marshal François Joseph Lefebvre, who was later created Duke of Danzig. Lefebvre lived there with his wife, Catherine Hübscher, and children. As a gift to Lefebvre, in recognition of his military service in the Napoleonic Wars, the emperor Napoleon provided a fine set of iron gates which had previously been installed at the Château de Saint-Cloud.

In 1881, the château was acquired by Frédéric Salomon Reitlinger, who was an adviser to Napoleon III during the Franco-Prussian War of 1870. It then became the home of the philosopher, Xavier Léon, in 1909. After the Second World War, the château became the Office de Protection des Enfants Juifs (Office for the Protection of Jewish Children). It remained in that use until it was acquired by the town council in 1968.
