= Lycée René Descartes (Champs-sur-Marne) =

School in France

Lycée René Descartes is a senior high school in Champs-sur-Marne, France, in the Paris metropolitan area.

As of 2016 the school has 731 students.
