= Villevaudé =

- Commune
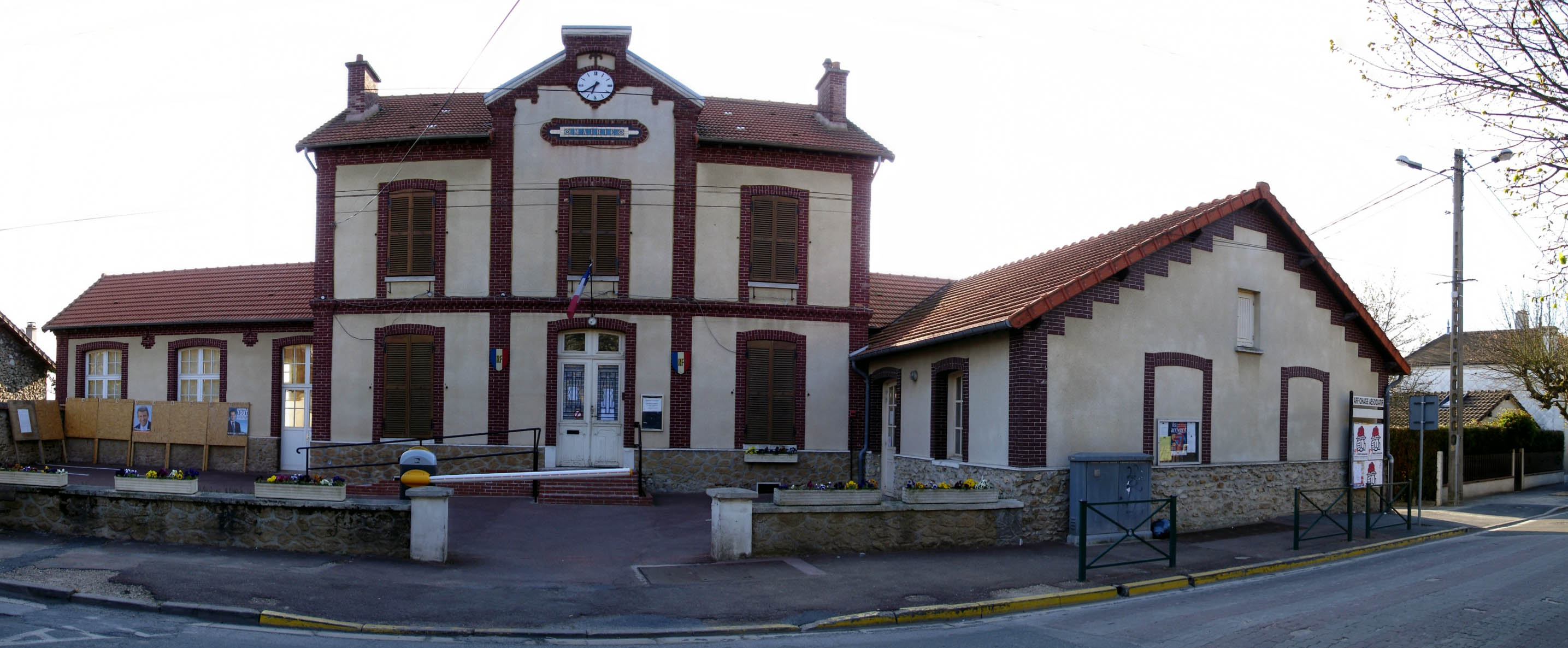
- The town hall of Villevaudé

- Coat of arms

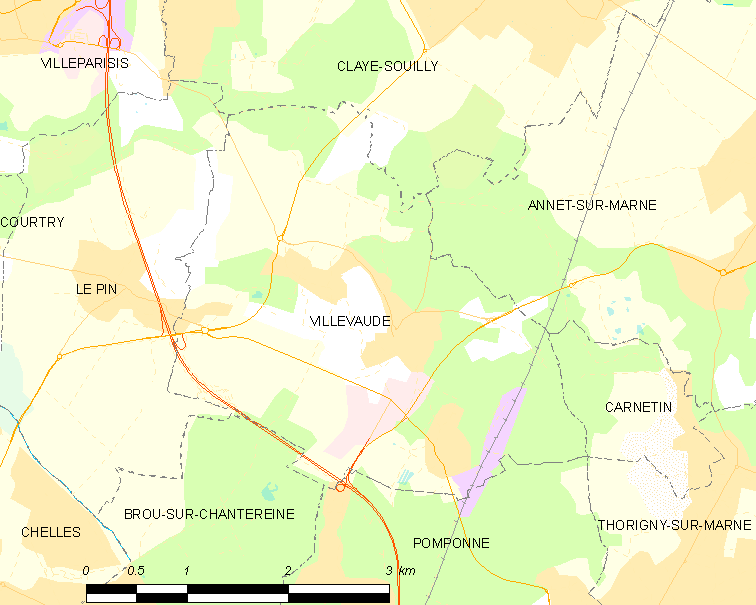
- Location of Villevaudé
- Location within France Location within Île-de-France (region)
- Coordinates: 48°55′06″N 2°39′08″E
- Country: France
- Region: Île-de-France
- Department: Seine-et-Marne
- Arrondissement: Meaux
- Canton: Villeparisis
- Intercommunality: CC Plaines et Monts de France

Government
  - Mayor (2020–2026): Nicolas Marceaux
- Area^{1}: 9.98 km^{2} (3.85 sq mi)
- Highest elevation: 132 m (433 ft)
- Lowest elevation: 56 m (184 ft)
- Population (2023): 2,132
  - Density: 214/km^{2} (553/sq mi)
- Time zone: UTC+01:00 (CET)
  - Summer (DST): UTC+02:00 (CEST)
- INSEE/Postal code: 77517 /77410
- ^{1} French Land Register data, which excludes lakes, ponds, glaciers > 1 km^{2} (0.386 sq mi or 247 acres) and river estuaries.

Villevaudé (French pronunciation: [vilvode]) is a commune in the Seine-et-Marne department in the Île-de-France region in north-central France.

== Population ==
Historical population
| Year | Pop. | ±% p.a. |
|---|---|---|
| 1968 | 897 | — |
| 1975 | 936 | +0.61% |
| 1982 | 1,076 | +2.01% |
| 1990 | 1,348 | +2.86% |
| 1999 | 1,599 | +1.92% |
| 2007 | 1,680 | +0.62% |
| 2012 | 2,040 | +3.96% |
| 2017 | 2,122 | +0.79% |
| 2023 | 2,132 | +0.08% |
Source: INSEE

Inhabitants of Villevaudé are called Villevaudéens in French.

== People ==
- Ivan Peychès (1906–1978) Member of the French Academy of Sciences, Officer of the Légion d'honneur.
- Léonor Fini, surrealist painter

== See also ==
- Communes of the Seine-et-Marne department
