= Le Pin, Seine-et-Marne =

Le Pin
- Commune
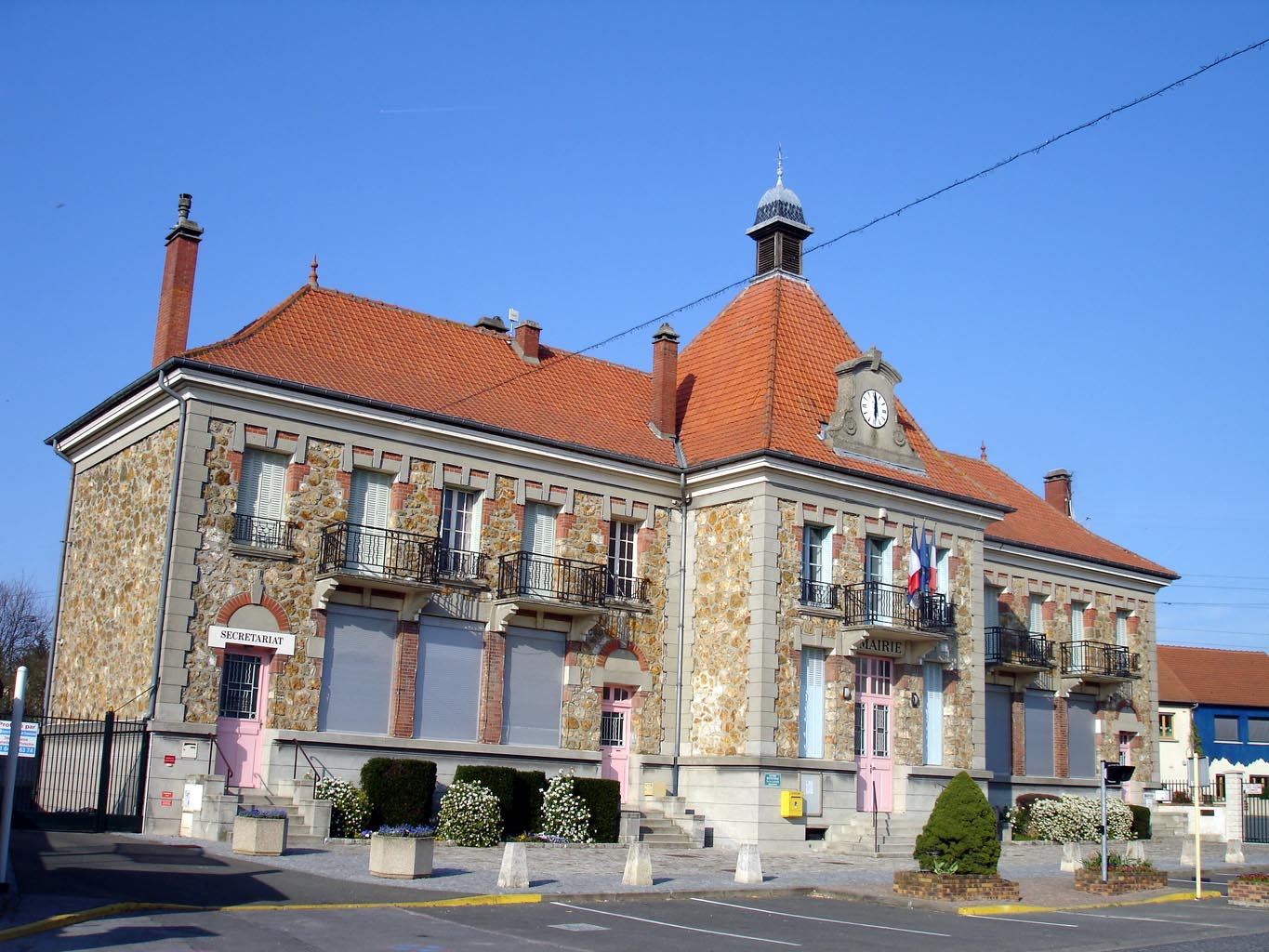
- The town hall of Le Pin

- Coat of arms

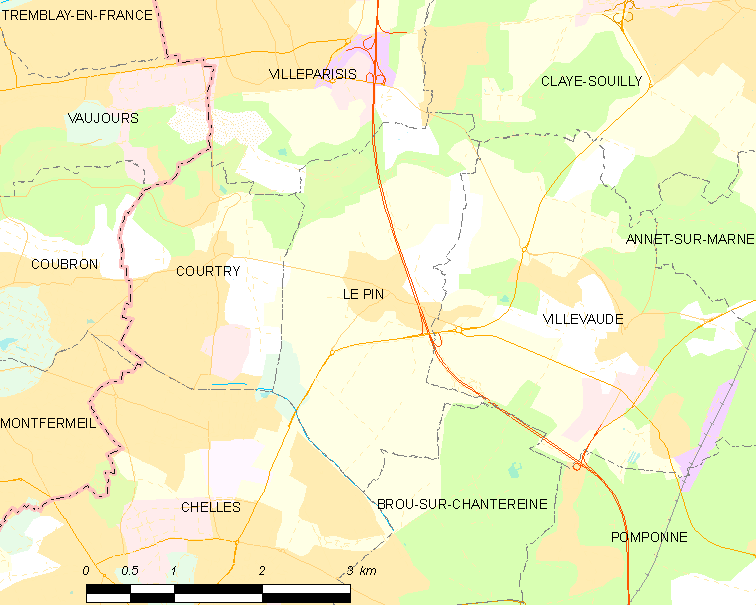
- Location of Le Pin
- Location within France Location within Île-de-France (region)
- Coordinates: 48°54′52″N 2°37′47″E
- Country: France
- Region: Île-de-France
- Department: Seine-et-Marne
- Arrondissement: Meaux
- Canton: Villeparisis
- Intercommunality: CC Plaines et Monts de France

Government
  - Mayor (2020–2026): Lydie Wallez
- Area^{1}: 6.70 km^{2} (2.59 sq mi)
- Highest elevation: 135 m (443 ft)
- Lowest elevation: 49 m (161 ft)
- Population (2023): 1,530
  - Density: 228/km^{2} (591/sq mi)
- Time zone: UTC+01:00 (CET)
  - Summer (DST): UTC+02:00 (CEST)
- INSEE/Postal code: 77363 /77181
- ^{1} French Land Register data, which excludes lakes, ponds, glaciers > 1 km^{2} (0.386 sq mi or 247 acres) and river estuaries.

Le Pin (French pronunciation: [lə pɛ̃]) is a commune in the Seine-et-Marne department in the Île-de-France region in north-central France.

== Demographics ==
Inhabitants are called Pinois.

== See also ==
- Communes of the Seine-et-Marne department
