= Communauté d'agglomération Paris - Vallée de la Marne =

Coordinates: 48.85°N 2.65°E

Paris - Vallée de la Marne
- Communauté d'agglomération
- Country: France
- Region: Île-de-France
- Department: Seine-et-Marne
- No. of communes: {{{nbcomm}}}
- Established: January 2016
- Area: 95.8 km^{2} (37.0 sq mi)
- Population (2018): 227,943
  - Density: 2,380/km^{2} (6,160/sq mi)

The Communauté d'agglomération Paris - Vallée de la Marne is a communauté d'agglomération in the Seine-et-Marne département and in the Île-de-France région of France. It was formed on 1 January 2016 by the merger of the former Communauté d'agglomération de Marne et Chantereine, Communauté d'agglomération de Marne-la-Vallée - Val Maubuée and Communauté d'agglomération de la Brie Francilienne. Its seat is in Torcy. Its area is 95.8 km^{2}. Its population was 227,943 in 2018, of which 55,148 in Chelles.

== Composition ==
It consists of 12 communes:

1. Brou-sur-Chantereine
2. Champs-sur-Marne
3. Chelles
4. Courtry
5. Croissy-Beaubourg
6. Émerainville
7. Lognes
8. Noisiel
9. Pontault-Combault
10. Roissy-en-Brie
11. Torcy
12. Vaires-sur-Marne
