= Hôtel de Ville, Champs-sur-Marne =

Town hall in Champs-sur-Marne, France

Hôtel de Ville
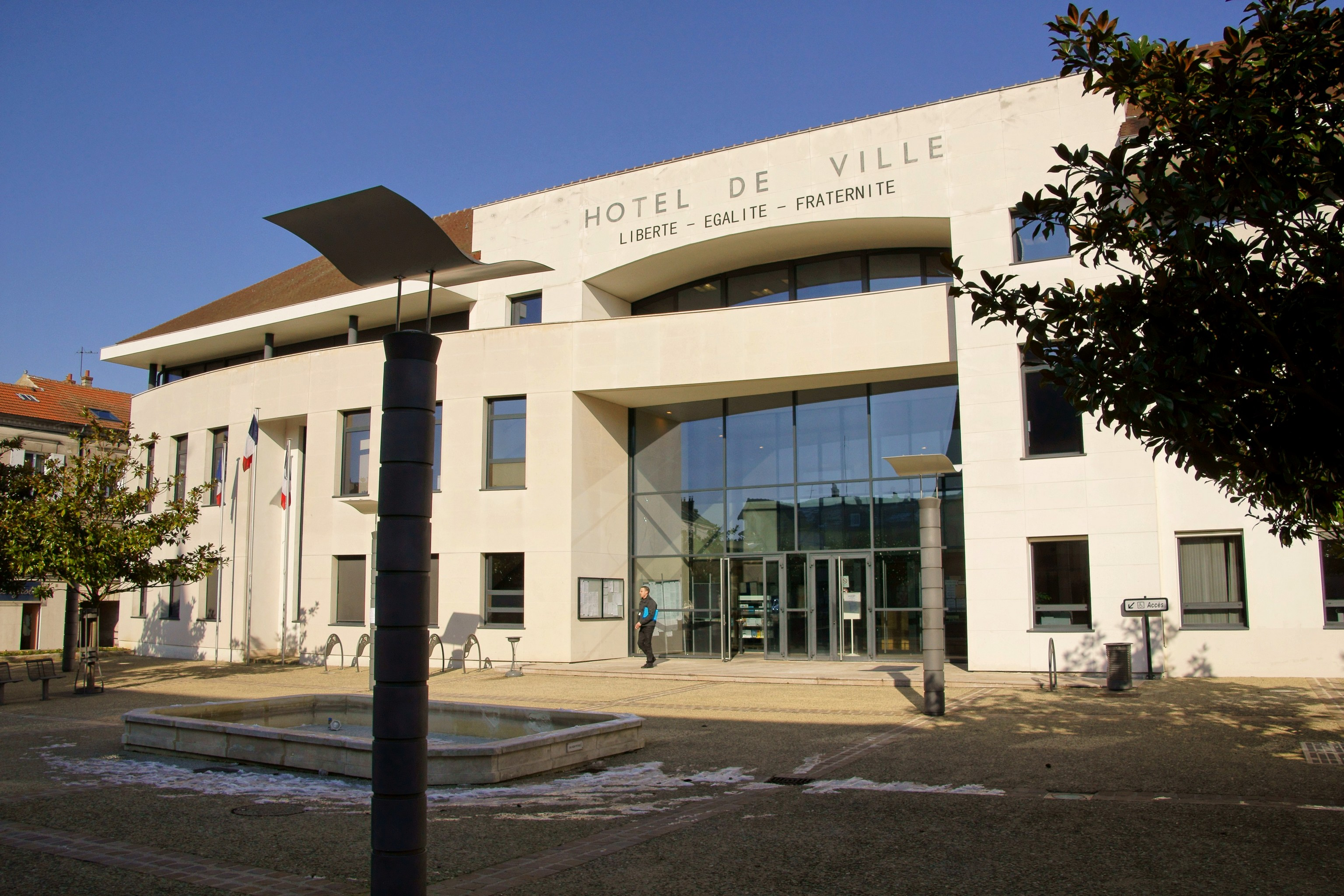
- The main frontage of the Hôtel de Ville in February 2010
- Interactive map of the Hôtel de Ville area

General information
- Type: City hall
- Architectural style: Modern style
- Location: Champs-sur-Marne, France
- Coordinates: 48.8530°N 2.6028°E
- Completed: 2002

Design and construction
- Architect: Cabinet ATE

The Hôtel de Ville (French pronunciation: [otɛl də vil], City Hall) is a municipal building in Champs-sur-Marne, Seine-et-Marne, in the eastern suburbs of Paris, standing on Rue de la Mairie.

== History ==
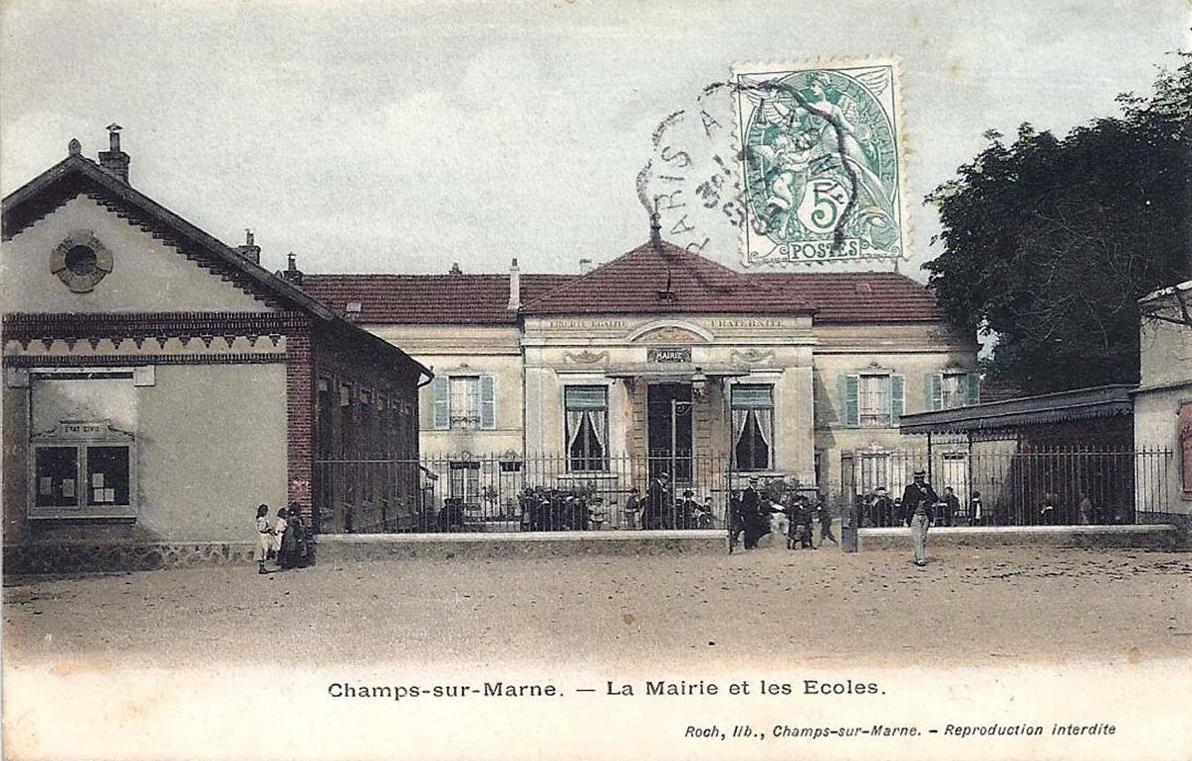
The old town hall (in the background) and the schools (in the foreground)

Following the French Revolution the town council initially met in the house of the mayor at the time. This arrangement continued until the late 19th century when the council led by the mayor, Jean-Sébastien Santerre, decided to commission a dedicated town hall. The site they selected was just to the north of the Church of Saint-Loup. The building was designed in the neoclassical style, built in brick with a cement render finish and was completed in 1892.

The design of the single-storey building involved a symmetrical main frontage of seven bays facing the church. The central section of three bays, which was slightly projected forward, featured a square headed doorway with a canopy flanked by a pair of casement windows. It was surmounted by an entablature, a segmental pediment above the doorway, and a pavilion-style roof. The wings were fenestrated in a similar style. Two separate buildings, one for the boys' school and the other for the girls' school, were erected in front of the wings in the early 20th century, so creating a courtyard in which the children could play. After the building was enlarged with an extra floor, a Salle des Fêtes (ballroom) was created on the first floor in 1932.

After Château de Champs-sur-Marne was modernised in 1959, to serve as guest palace for visiting heads of state, the town hall hosted a series of important visitors who received the freedom of Champs-sur-Marne. These included President Philibert Tsiranana of Madagascar in October 1960, President Léopold Sédar Senghor of Senegal in April 1961, President Fulbert Youlou of the Republic of the Congo in November 1961, President Maurice Yaméogo of the Rupublic of Upper Volta in April 1962, President Nicolas Grunitzky of Togo in March 1964, and President Jean-Bédel Bokassa of the Central African Republic in February 1969.

In the late 20th century, following significant population growth, the council led by the mayor, Maud Tallet, decided to have the old town hall demolished and to commission a modern municipal building on the same site. The old town hall was demolished in February 1999, the area in front of the former building was landscaped and a fountain was installed shortly thereafter. Construction of the new building, which was undertaken by SAN du Val Maubué, started in 2000. The new building was designed by Cabinet ATE in the modern style, built in concrete and glass at a cost of €5.3 million and was completed in 2002.

The design of the three-story building involved an asymmetrical main frontage of 18 bays facing the church. The left-hand section of seven bays was projected forward in a curve while the right-hand section of 10 bays section featured a parapet which was projected forward above the first floor. The central bay featured a recessed, full height, segmental-headed entrance leading to an atrium. The fourth bay on the left was fenestrated by a tall lancet window spanning the first two floors, while the other bays were fenestrated by square shaped casement windows on the first two floors and by smaller recessed windows on the second floor. Internally, the principal room was the Salle du Conseil (council chamber).
