= Croissy =

Croissy is part of the name of several communes of France:

- Croissy-Beaubourg, in the Seine-et-Marne département
- Croissy-sur-Seine, in the Yvelines département
