= Canton of Pontault-Combault =

Coordinates: 48.8014°N 2.6075°E

Pontault-Combault
- Canton
- Country: France
- Region: Île-de-France
- Department: Seine-et-Marne
- No. of communes: {{{nbcomm}}}
- Area: 32.75 km^{2} (12.64 sq mi)
- Population (2023): 70,015
  - Density: 2,138/km^{2} (5,537/sq mi)
- INSEE code: 77 17

The canton of Pontault-Combault is a French administrative division, located in the arrondissement of Torcy, in the Seine-et-Marne département (Île-de-France région).

== Demographics ==
Historical population
Year	Pop.	±% p.a.
2013	67,850	—
2018	68,392	+0.16%
Source: INSEE

== Composition ==
At the French canton reorganisation which came into effect in March 2015, the canton was expanded from 1 to 3 communes:

- Émerainville
- Pontault-Combault
- Roissy-en-Brie

== See also ==
- Cantons of the Seine-et-Marne department
- Communes of the Seine-et-Marne department
