= Émerainville =

- Commune
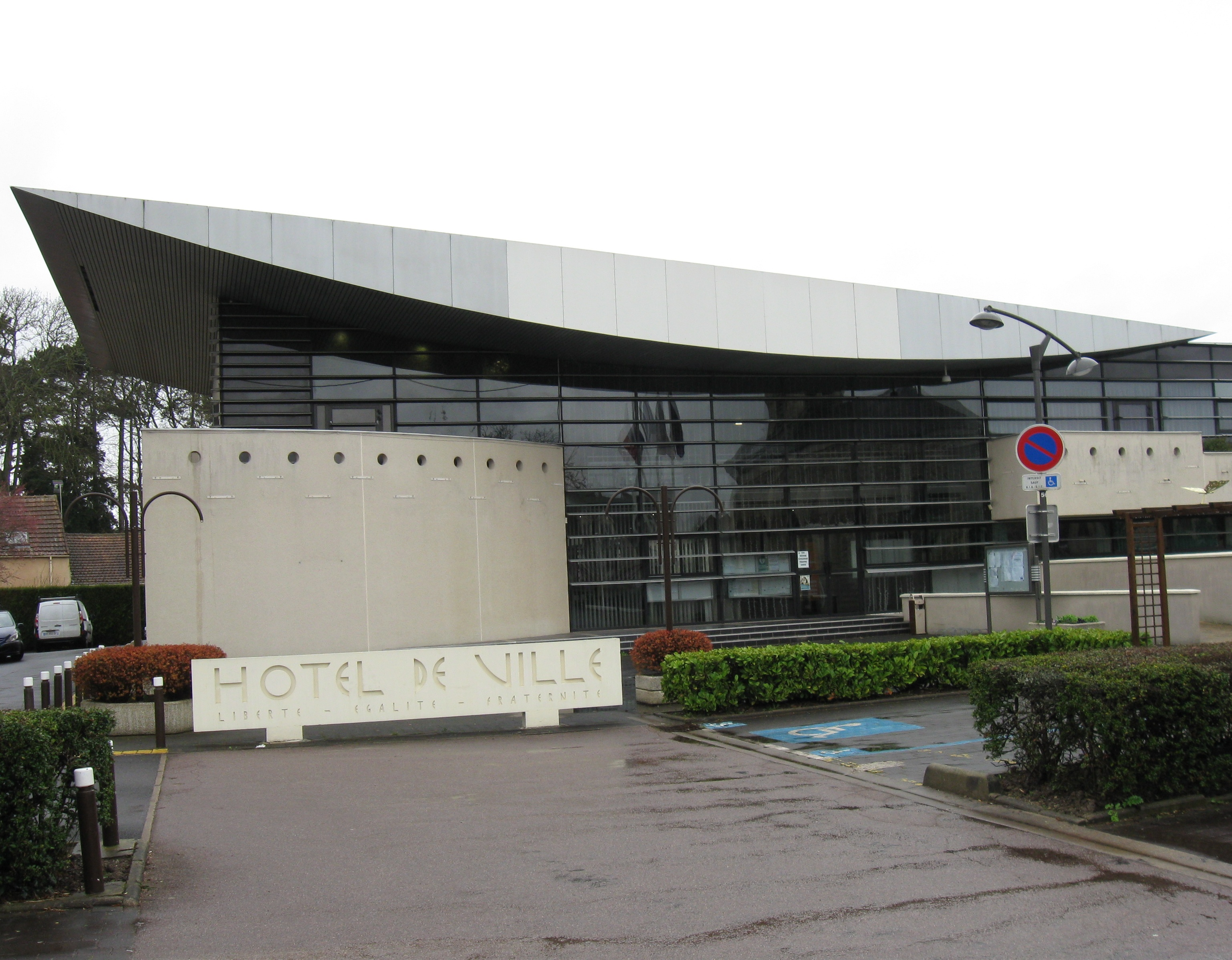
- The town hall of Émerainville

- Coat of arms

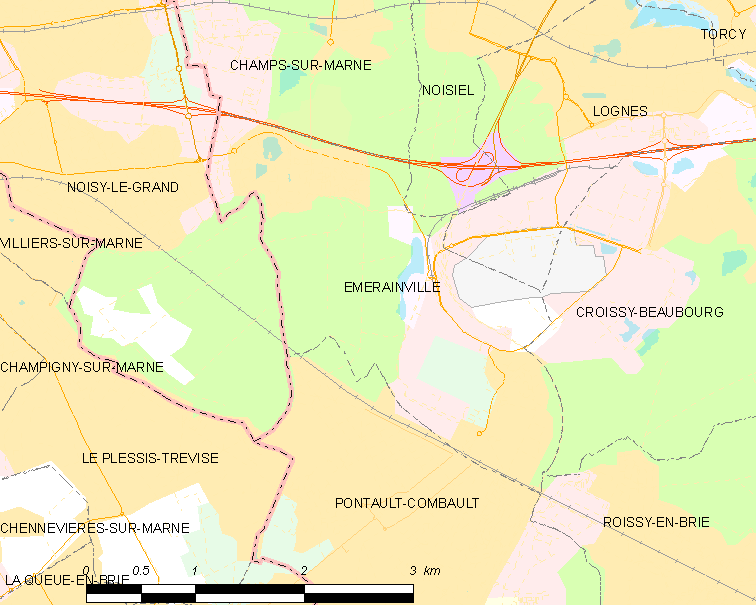
- Location of Émerainville
- Location within France Location within Île-de-France (region)
- Coordinates: 48°48′39″N 2°37′25″E
- Country: France
- Region: Île-de-France
- Department: Seine-et-Marne
- Arrondissement: Torcy
- Canton: Pontault-Combault
- Intercommunality: CA Paris - Vallée de la Marne

Government
  - Mayor (2020–2026): Alain Kelyor
- Area^{1}: 5.46 km^{2} (2.11 sq mi)
- Highest elevation: 113 m (371 ft)
- Lowest elevation: 83 m (272 ft)
- Population (2023): 7,690
  - Density: 1,410/km^{2} (3,650/sq mi)
- Time zone: UTC+01:00 (CET)
  - Summer (DST): UTC+02:00 (CEST)
- INSEE/Postal code: 77169 /77184
- ^{1} French Land Register data, which excludes lakes, ponds, glaciers > 1 km^{2} (0.386 sq mi or 247 acres) and river estuaries.

Émerainville (French pronunciation: [em(ə)ʁɛ̃vil]) is a commune in the Seine-et-Marne département in the Île-de-France region in north-central France.

== Demographics ==
Inhabitants of Émerainville are called Émerainvillois in French.

Historical population
Year	Pop.	±% p.a.
1968	621	—
1975	743	+2.60%
1982	2,453	+18.60%
1990	6,766	+13.52%
1999	7,027	+0.42%
2007	7,152	+0.22%
2012	7,355	+0.56%
2017	7,720	+0.97%
2023	7,690	−0.06%
Source: INSEE

== Education ==
Primary school groups (combined preschools and elementary schools) include Bois d'Emery, Jean-Jaurès, La Mare l'Embûche, Lavoisier, and Malnoue II. There is one junior high school, Collège Vincent Van Gogh. There is one tertiary educational institution, Université de Technologie et d'Enseignement Consulaire.

== Parks and recreation ==
Athletic facilities:

- Gymnase Jacques Anquetil
- Piscine d'Emerainville
- Stade Dominique Rocheteau
- Espace sportif Guy Drut (sports hall)

== See also ==
- Communes of the Seine-et-Marne department
