= Hôtel de Ville, Chelles =

Town hall in Chelles, Seine-et-Marne, France

Hôtel de Ville
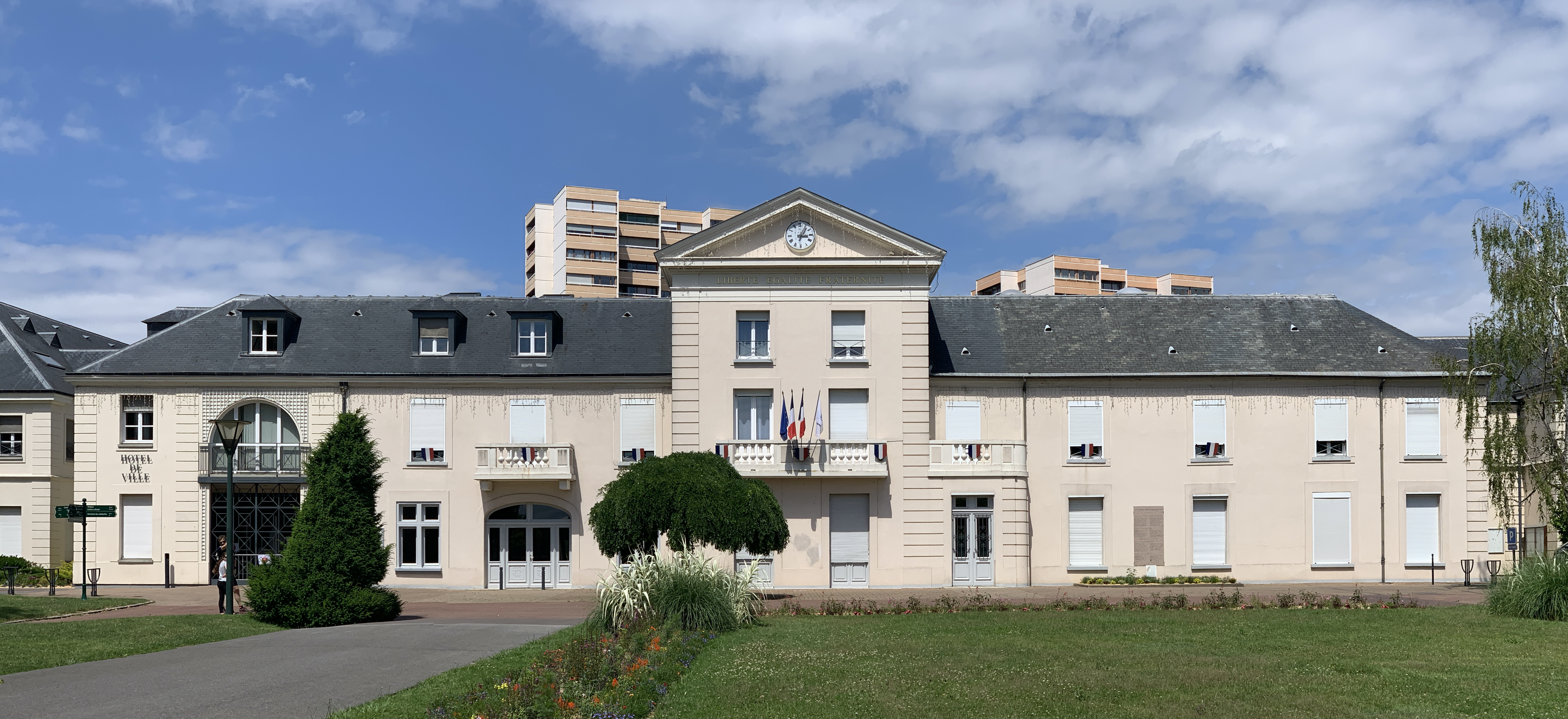
- The main frontage of the Hôtel de Ville in June 2020
- Interactive map of the Hôtel de Ville area

General information
- Type: City hall
- Architectural style: Neoclassical style
- Location: Chelles, France
- Coordinates: 48.8777°N 2.5900°E
- Completed: c.1850

The Hôtel de Ville (French pronunciation: [otɛl də vil], City Hall) is a municipal building in Chelles, Seine-et-Marne, in the eastern suburbs of Paris, standing on Parc du souvenir Emile Fouchard.

== History ==
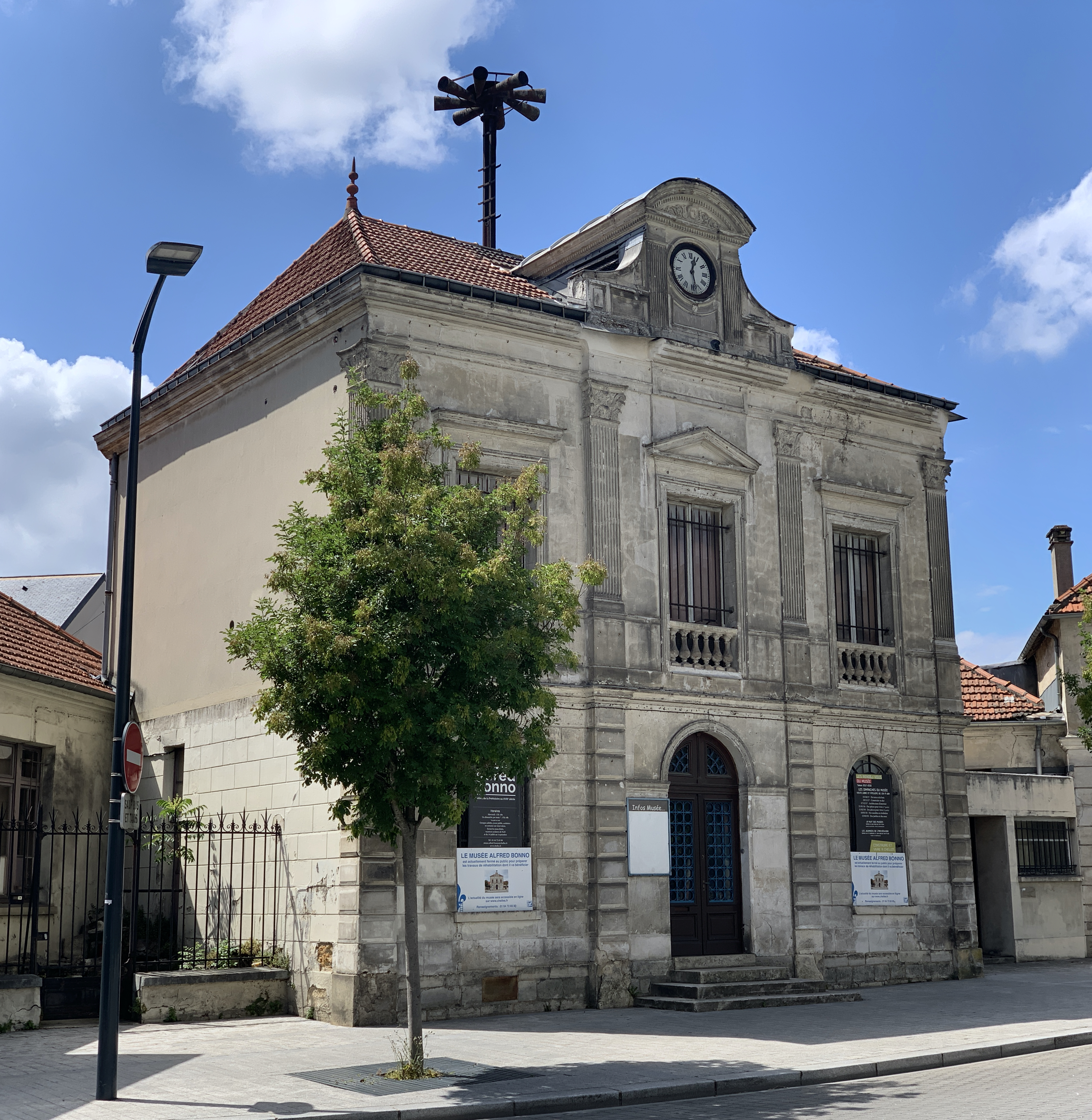
The old town hall

Following the French Revolution, the town council initially met in the "Grenier Neuf" (New Attic), a building which had been used by the nuns of Chelles Abbey. The council then briefly held meetings in a room in the local guardhouse, but subsequent meetings were generally held in the mayor's private house.

However, in the mid-19th century, the council decided to commission a dedicated town hall. The site they selected was on the corner of Rue Louis Éterlet and Rue Adolphe Besson. The new building was designed by Jean-Paul Mabille in the neoclassical style, built in ashlar stone and was officially opened by the mayor, Charles Félix Buignet, on 16 August 1862. The design involved a symmetrical main frontage of three bays facing the corner of the two streets. The central bay featured a round headed opening with a moulded surround on the ground floor, and a casement window with a balustrade and a triangular pediment on the first floor. The central bay was surmounted by a clock flanked by pilasters supporting a segmental pediment, and there was an octagonal lantern behind the clock. The outer bays were fenestrated by round headed windows on the ground floor and by casement windows with balustrades and cornices on the first floor. The building was badly damaged in 1870, during the Franco-Prussian War, but subsequently restored.

Following significant population growth in the early decades of the 20th century, the town council led by the mayor, Émile Fouchard, decided to acquire a more substantial property for municipal use. The property they selected was just to the west of the old town hall, on the site of Chelles Abbey.

During the French Revolution, the abbey was destroyed and the nuns driven out. A local resident, Jean-Jacques Gasnier-Guy, acquired the site, including the cloisters of the abbey and the surrounding park, in the mid-19th century. He commissioned the current building, which was designed in the neoclassical style, built in brick with a cement render and was completed in around 1850. The new building incorporated the cloisters of the old abbey. The original design involved a main frontage of eight bays facing southwest onto the park. The central section of two bays was four storeys high, while the wings of three bays each were two storeys high. There was a segmental headed doorway in the second bay on the left, while the other bays were fenestrated with casement windows. At roof level, there was a pediment above the central section. The building passed to Jean-Jacques's son, Philippe Ambroise Gasnier-Guy, in 1872, and then to Philippe's widow, Jeanne Louise Estelle Koller in 1888. After Estelle's death in 1936, the town council acquired the building in 1937. It was then converted for municipal use and was officially re-opened by Fouchard on 1 April 1938.

During the Paris insurrection, part of the Second World War, the French Forces of the Interior seized the town hall on 23 August 1944. However, after two days of fighting, German troops recaptured the building. They then arrested 25 local people at random, and lined up 14 of them against the wall of the town hall and shot them. They also blew up the central section of the town hall, using dynamite, before departing. The central section of the town hall was subsequently rebuilt but with three storeys instead of four. A plaque was also installed on the façade of the building to commemorate the lives of the 14 local people shot at the town hall, the 14 local people shot in the Bois de Boulogne massacre and 19 other local people who were killed by German forces in various other places.

Meanwhile, the old town hall, which had been converted into a police station in 1938, became the Alfred Bonno Museum in 1950. Two wings were added to the rear of the new town hall, along the axis of the original abbey buildings, in the 1990s.
