= Canton of Champs-sur-Marne =

Coordinates: 48°49′56″N 2°36′45″E

Champs-sur-Marne
- Canton
- Country: France
- Region: Île-de-France
- Department: Seine-et-Marne
- No. of communes: {{{nbcomm}}}
- Area: 26.70 km^{2} (10.31 sq mi)
- Population (2023): 60,596
  - Density: 2,270/km^{2} (5,878/sq mi)
- INSEE code: 77 01

The canton of Champs-sur-Marne is a French administrative division, located in the arrondissement of Torcy, in the Seine-et-Marne département (Île-de-France région).

== Demographics ==
Historical population
Year	Pop.	±% p.a.
2013	56,578	—
2018	57,561	+0.35%
Source: INSEE

== Composition ==
At the French canton reorganisation which came into effect in March 2015, the canton was expanded from 2 to 4 communes:

- Champs-sur-Marne
- Croissy-Beaubourg
- Lognes
- Noisiel

== See also ==
- Cantons of the Seine-et-Marne department
- Communes of the Seine-et-Marne department
