= Vaires-sur-Marne =

- Commune
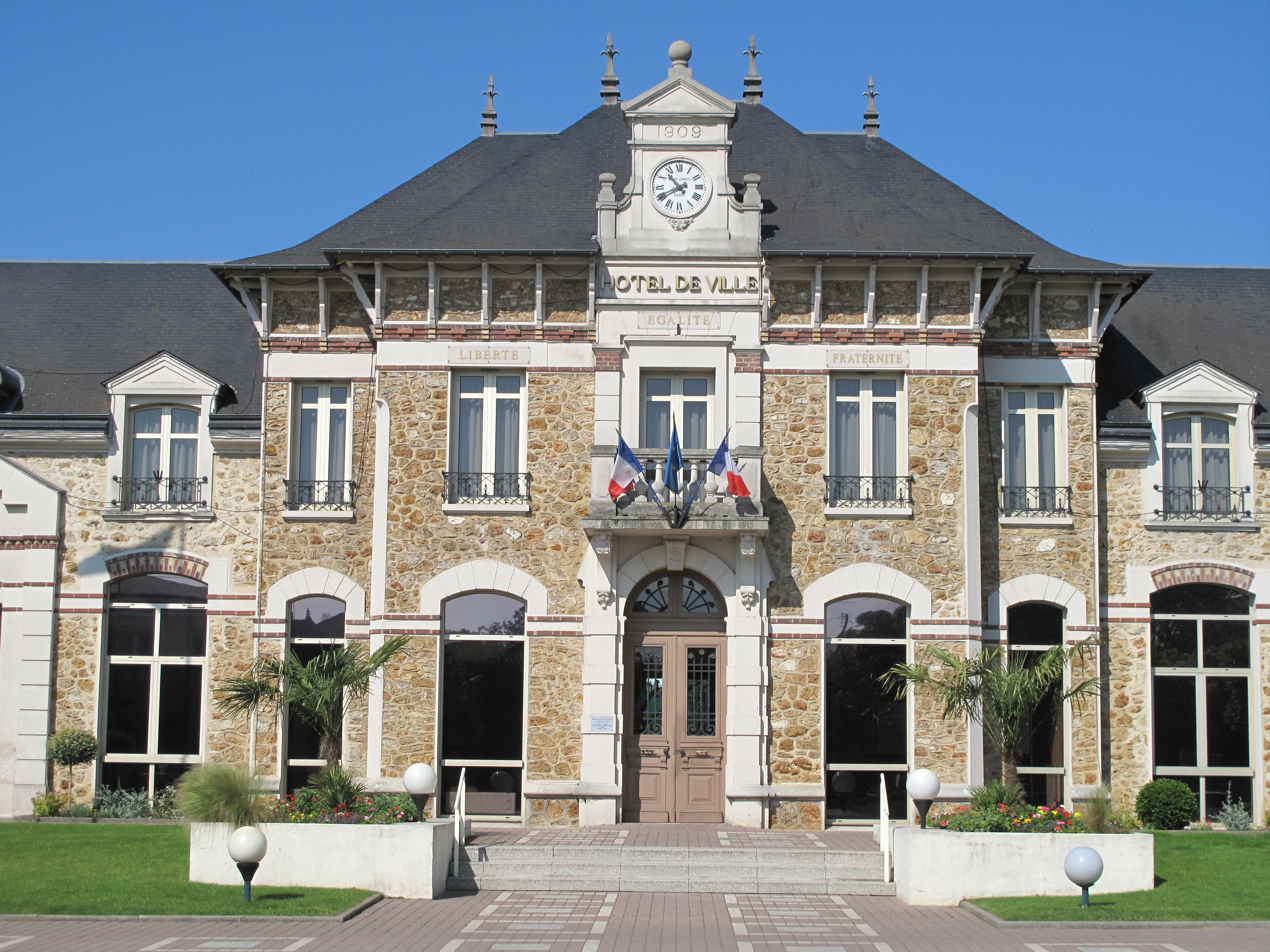
- The town hall of Vaires-sur-Marne

- Coat of arms

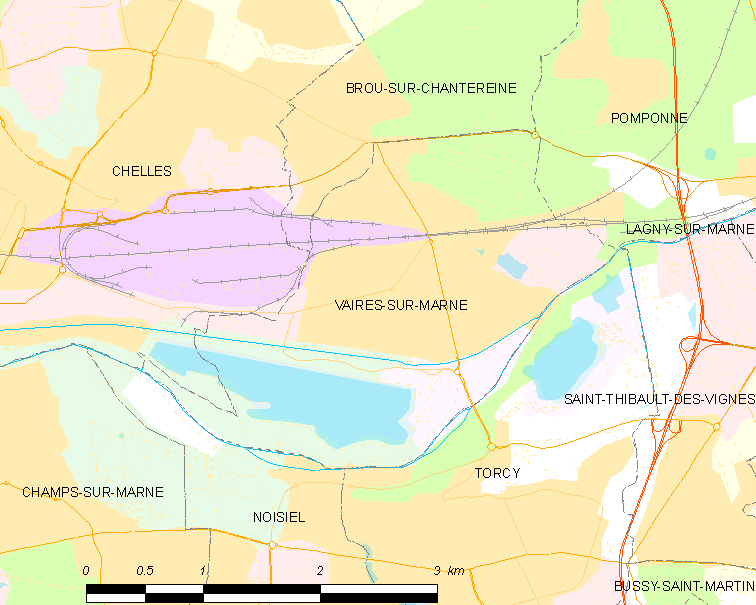
- Location of Vaires-sur-Marne
- Location within France Location within Île-de-France (region)
- Coordinates: 48°52′00″N 2°39′00″E
- Country: France
- Region: Île-de-France
- Department: Seine-et-Marne
- Arrondissement: Torcy
- Canton: Villeparisis
- Intercommunality: CA Paris - Vallée de la Marne

Government
  - Mayor (2020–2026): Edmonde Jardin
- Area^{1}: 6.02 km^{2} (2.32 sq mi)
- Highest elevation: 52 m (171 ft)
- Lowest elevation: 38 m (125 ft)
- Population (2023): 13,931
  - Density: 2,310/km^{2} (5,990/sq mi)
- Demonym: Vairois
- Time zone: UTC+01:00 (CET)
  - Summer (DST): UTC+02:00 (CEST)
- INSEE/Postal code: 77479 /77360
- Website: www.vairessurmarne.com
- ^{1} French Land Register data, which excludes lakes, ponds, glaciers > 1 km^{2} (0.386 sq mi or 247 acres) and river estuaries.

Vaires-sur-Marne (French pronunciation: [vɛːʁ syʁ maʁn]; lit. ''Vaires-on-Marne') is a commune in the Seine-et-Marne department in the Île-de-France region, Northern France.

Vaires-sur-Marne is at the western end of the LGV Est high-speed railway, reaching Vendenheim (near Strasbourg) in the east. Vaires–Torcy station has rail connections to Meaux and Paris. It was spectacularly blown up in John Frankenheimer's 1964 film The Train.

It was one of the venues for the 2024 Summer Olympics.

== Demographics ==
Inhabitants of Vaires-sur-Marne are called Vairois (masculine) and Vairoises (feminine) in French.

Historical population
| Year | Pop. | ±% p.a. |
|---|---|---|
| 1968 | 8,455 | — |
| 1975 | 10,019 | +2.45% |
| 1982 | 10,812 | +1.09% |
| 1990 | 11,194 | +0.43% |
| 1999 | 11,772 | +0.56% |
| 2007 | 11,765 | −0.01% |
| 2012 | 13,273 | +2.44% |
| 2017 | 13,327 | +0.08% |
| 2023 | 13,931 | +0.74% |
Source: INSEE

== See also ==
- Communes of the Seine-et-Marne department
