= Canton of Chelles =

Coordinates: 48.8833°N 2.6000°E

Chelles
- Canton
- Country: France
- Region: Île-de-France
- Department: Seine-et-Marne
- No. of communes: {{{nbcomm}}}
- Area: 15.90 km^{2} (6.14 sq mi)
- Population (2023): 54,620
  - Density: 3,435/km^{2} (8,897/sq mi)
- INSEE code: 77 02

The canton of Chelles is a French administrative division, located in the arrondissement of Torcy, in the Seine-et-Marne département (Île-de-France région).

== Demographics ==
Historical population
Year	Pop.	±% p.a.
2013	53,569	—
2018	55,148	+0.58%
Source: INSEE

== Composition ==
Since the French canton reorganisation which came into effect in March 2015, the canton consists of the commune of Chelles.

== See also ==
- Cantons of the Seine-et-Marne department
- Communes of the Seine-et-Marne department
