= Courtry =

- Commune
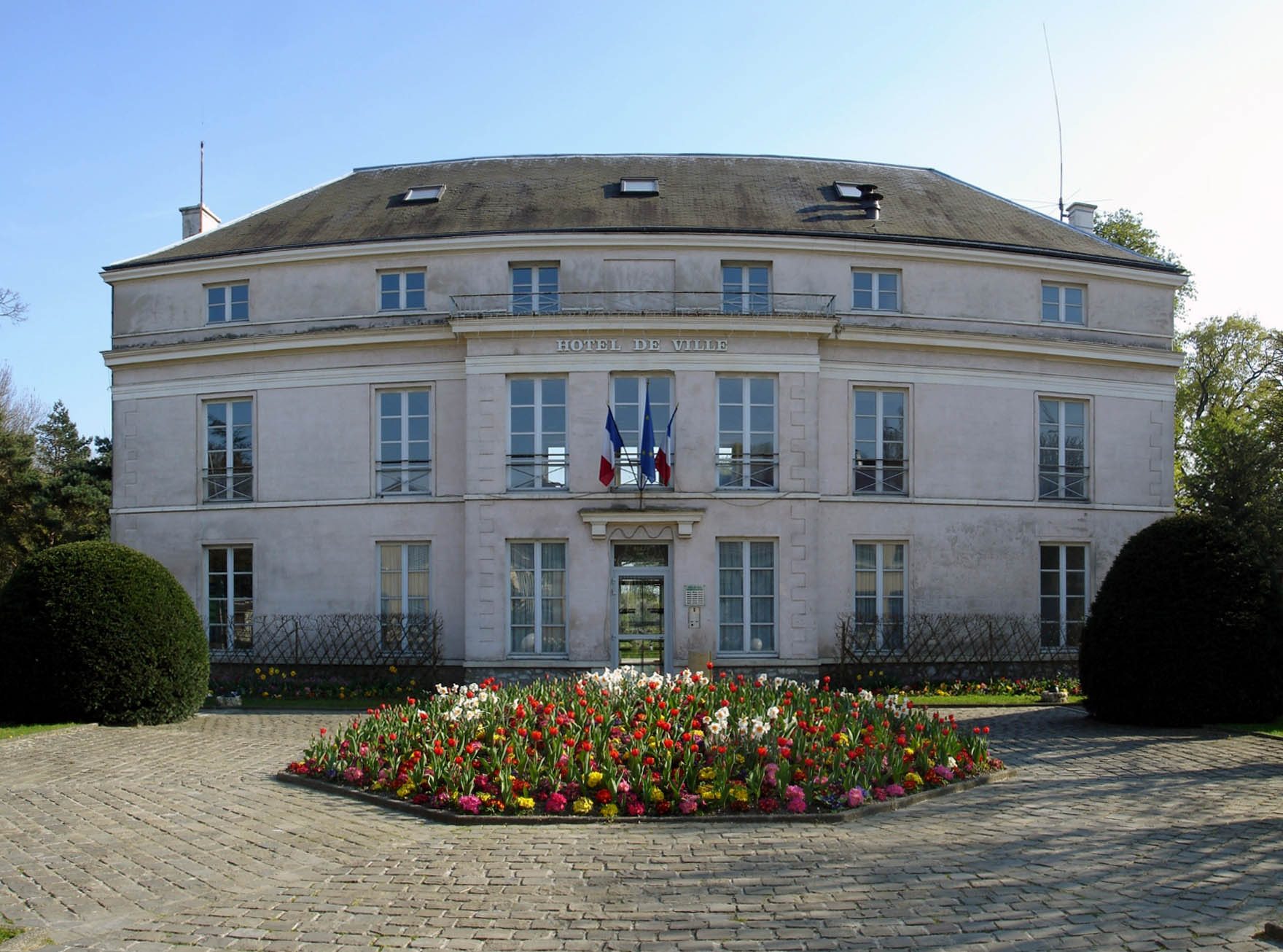
- The town Hall of Courtry

- Coat of arms

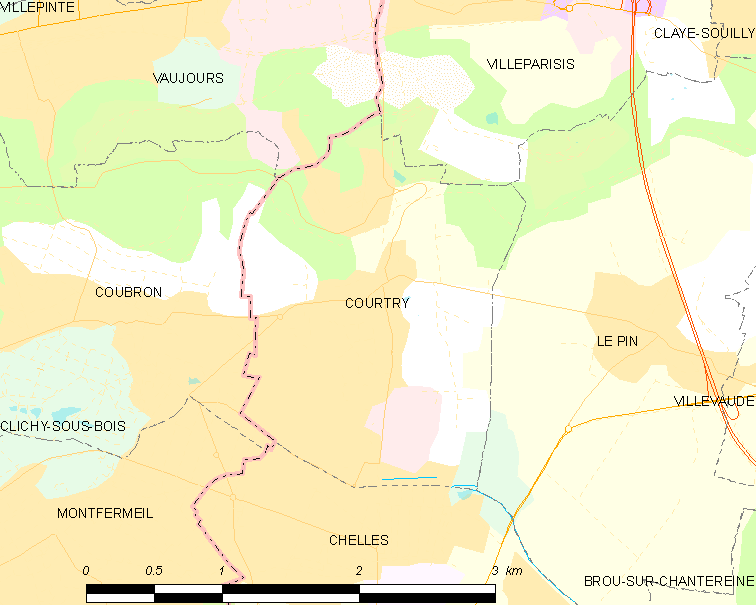
- Location of Courtry
- Location within France Location within Île-de-France (region)
- Coordinates: 48°55′03″N 2°36′11″E
- Country: France
- Region: Île-de-France
- Department: Seine-et-Marne
- Arrondissement: Torcy
- Canton: Villeparisis
- Intercommunality: CA Paris - Vallée de la Marne

Government
  - Mayor (2020–2026): Xavier Vanderbise
- Area^{1}: 4.16 km^{2} (1.61 sq mi)
- Highest elevation: 130 m (430 ft)
- Lowest elevation: 53 m (174 ft)
- Population (2023): 7,330
  - Density: 1,760/km^{2} (4,560/sq mi)
- Time zone: UTC+01:00 (CET)
  - Summer (DST): UTC+02:00 (CEST)
- INSEE/Postal code: 77139 /77181
- ^{1} French Land Register data, which excludes lakes, ponds, glaciers > 1 km^{2} (0.386 sq mi or 247 acres) and river estuaries.

Courtry (French pronunciation: [kuʁtʁi]) is a commune in the Seine-et-Marne département in the Île-de-France region in north-central France.

== Demographics ==
The inhabitants are called Courtrysiens in French.

Historical population
Year	Pop.	±% p.a.
1968	2,489	—
1975	3,249	+3.88%
1982	4,215	+3.79%
1990	5,503	+3.39%
1999	6,036	+1.03%
2007	5,989	−0.10%
2012	6,403	+1.35%
2017	6,492	+0.28%
2023	7,330	+2.04%
Source: INSEE

== See also ==
- Communes of the Seine-et-Marne department
