= Brou-sur-Chantereine =

- Commune
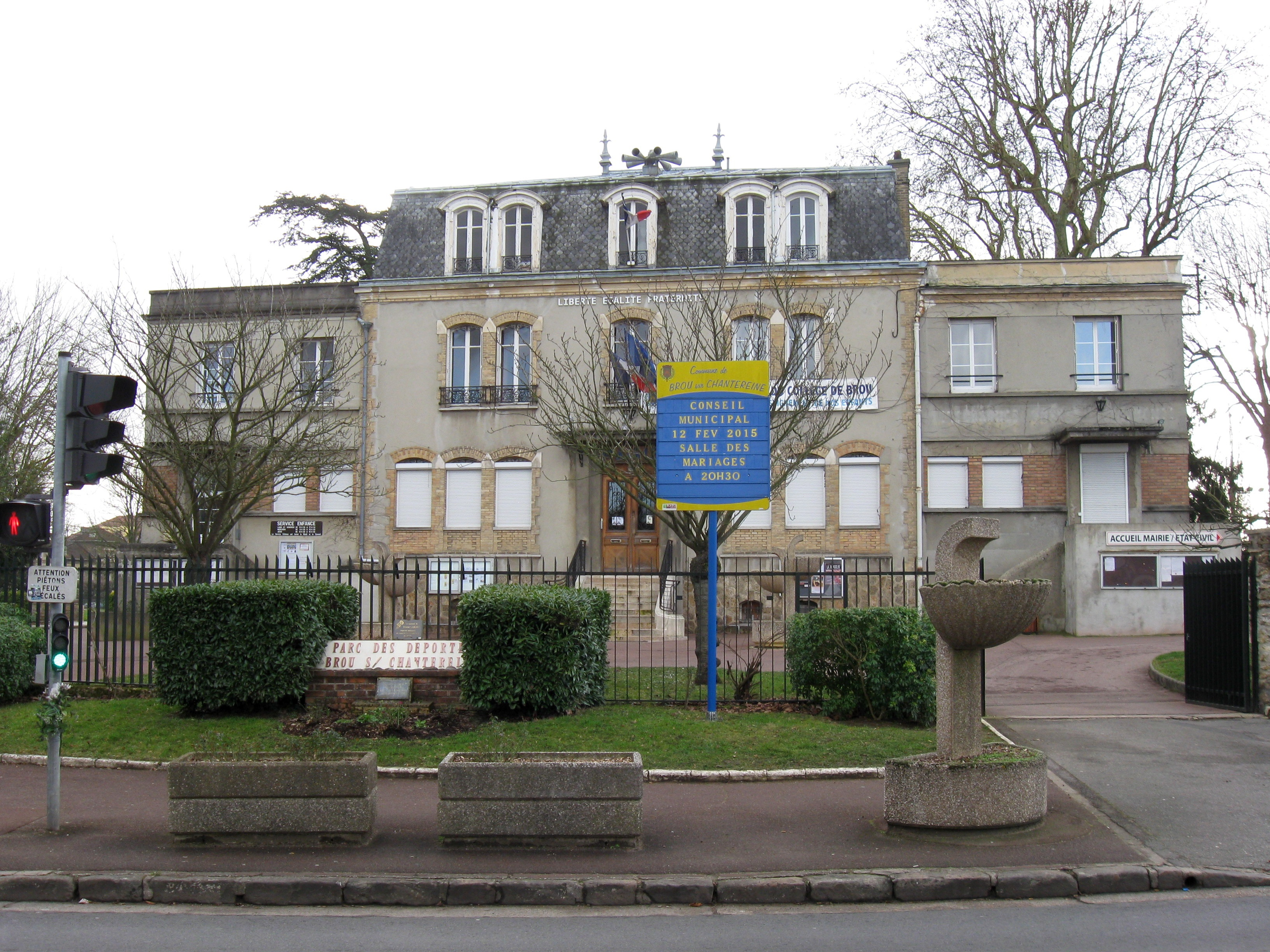
- The town hall of Brou-sur-Chantereine

- Coat of arms

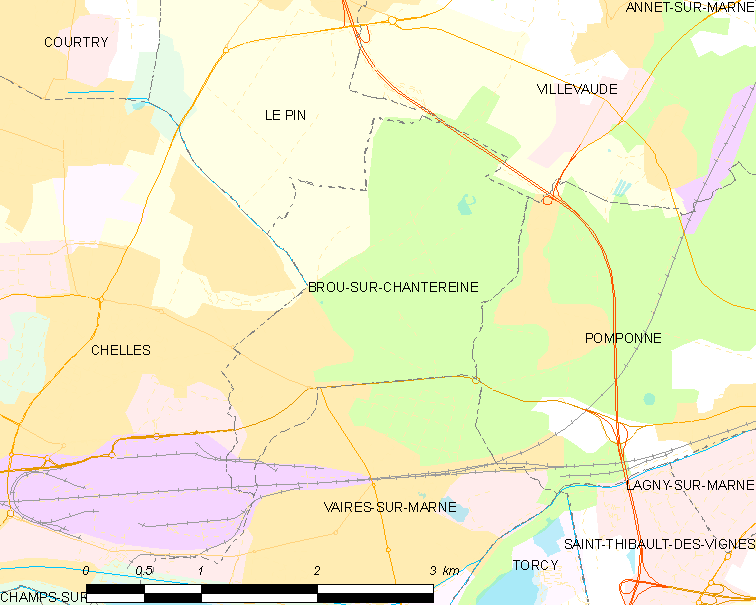
- Location of Brou-sur-Chantereine
- Location within France Location within Île-de-France (region)
- Coordinates: 48°52′54″N 2°37′54″E
- Country: France
- Region: Île-de-France
- Department: Seine-et-Marne
- Arrondissement: Torcy
- Canton: Villeparisis
- Intercommunality: CA Paris - Vallée de la Marne

Government
  - Mayor (2020–2026): Stéphanie Barnier
- Area^{1}: 4.28 km^{2} (1.65 sq mi)
- Highest elevation: 67 m (220 ft)
- Lowest elevation: 40 m (130 ft)
- Population (2023): 5,196
  - Density: 1,210/km^{2} (3,140/sq mi)
- Time zone: UTC+01:00 (CET)
  - Summer (DST): UTC+02:00 (CEST)
- INSEE/Postal code: 77055 /77177
- ^{1} French Land Register data, which excludes lakes, ponds, glaciers > 1 km^{2} (0.386 sq mi or 247 acres) and river estuaries.

Brou-sur-Chantereine (French pronunciation: [bʁu syʁ ʃɑ̃tʁɛn]) is a commune in the Seine-et-Marne department, in the Île-de-France region, north-central France.

== Population ==
Historical population
Year	Pop.	±% p.a.
1968	3,269	—
1975	4,664	+5.21%
1982	4,429	−0.74%
1990	4,469	+0.11%
1999	4,280	−0.48%
2007	4,253	−0.08%
2012	4,393	+0.65%
2017	4,382	−0.05%
2023	5,196	+2.88%
Source: INSEE

Inhabitants are called Breuillois in French.

== See also ==
- Communes of the Seine-et-Marne department
