= Chelles, Seine-et-Marne =

Chelles
- Commune
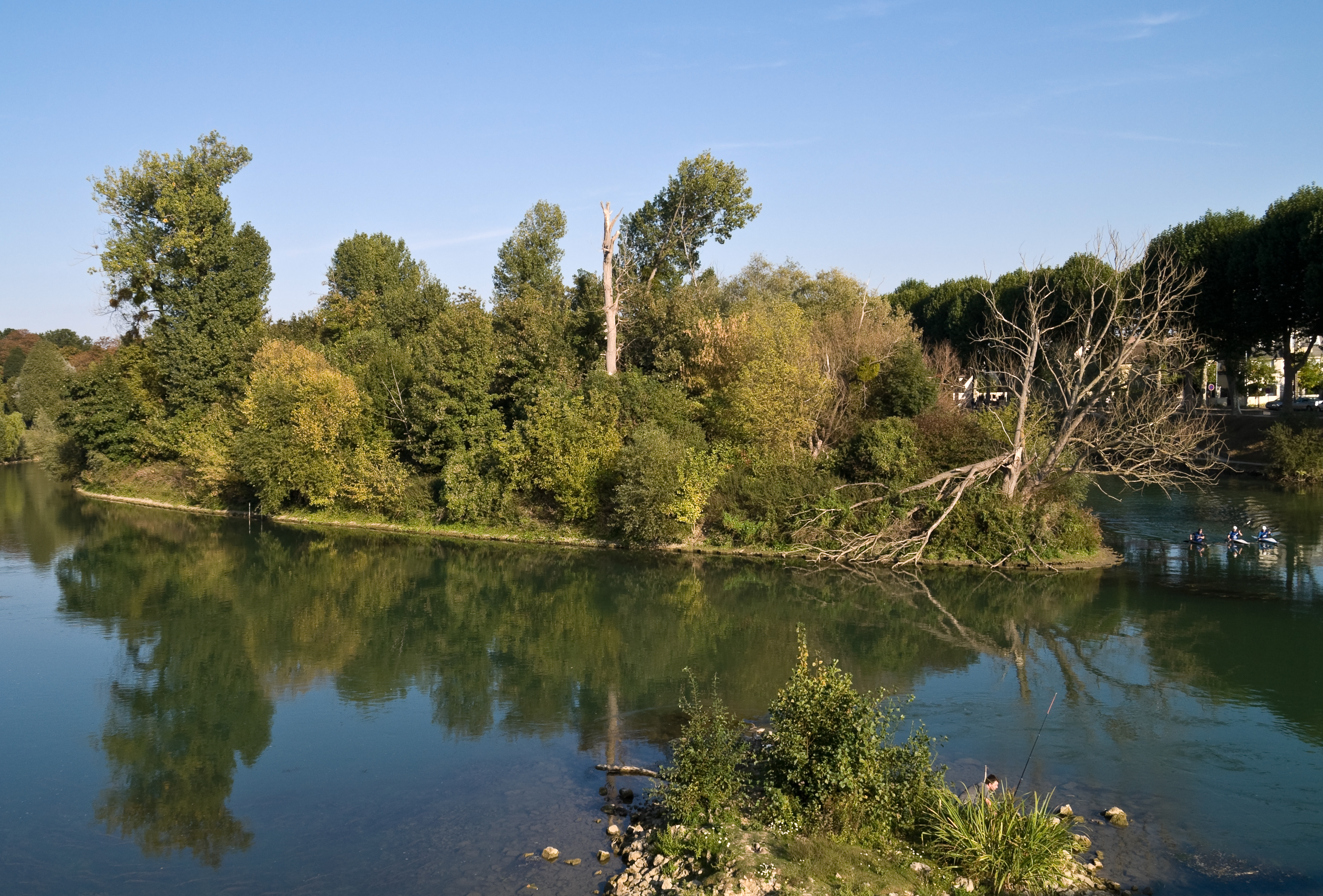
- Île Refuge, in the Marne river in Chelles

- Coat of arms

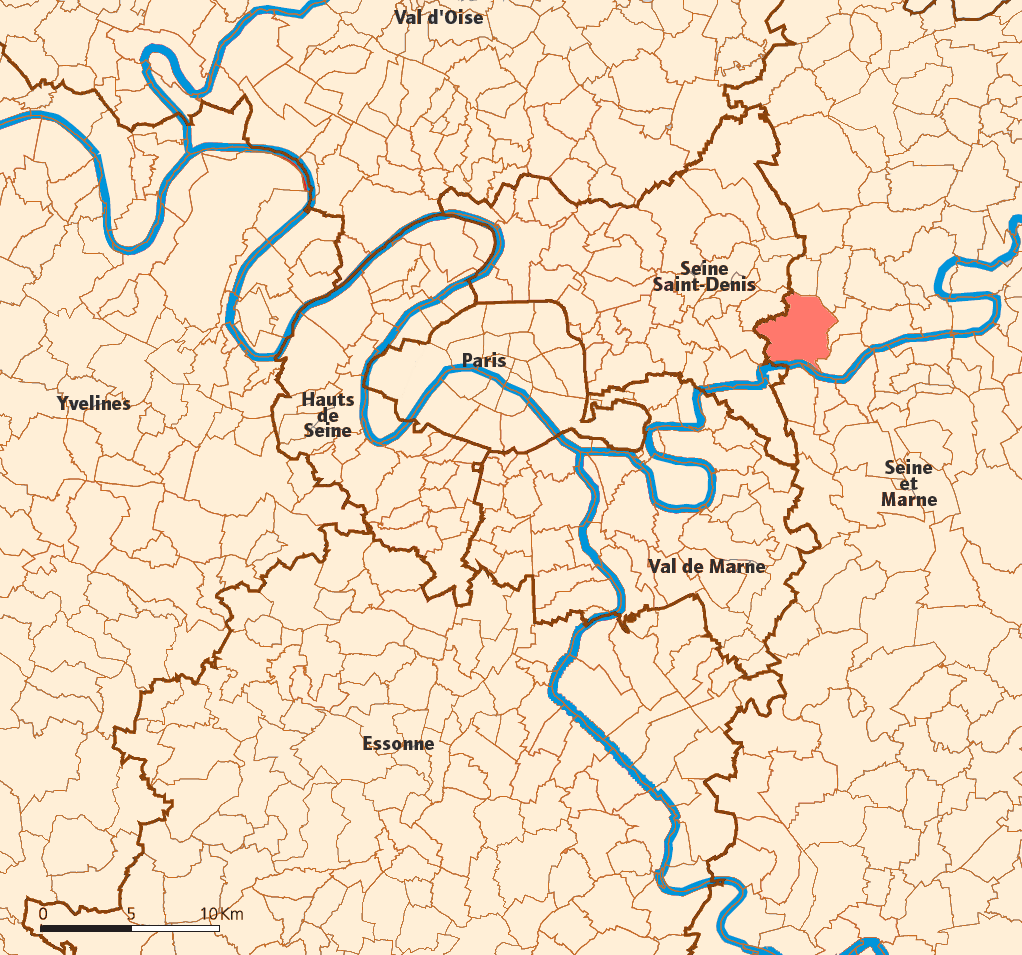
- Location (in red) within Paris inner and outer suburbs
- Location of Chelles
- Location within France Location within Île-de-France (region)
- Coordinates: 48°53′00″N 2°36′00″E
- Country: France
- Region: Île-de-France
- Department: Seine-et-Marne
- Arrondissement: Torcy
- Canton: Chelles
- Intercommunality: CA Paris - Vallée de la Marne

Government
  - Mayor (2020–2026): Brice Rabaste
- Area^{1}: 16.3 km^{2} (6.3 sq mi)
- Highest elevation: 106 m (348 ft)
- Lowest elevation: 36 m (118 ft)
- Population (2023): 54,620
  - Density: 3,350/km^{2} (8,680/sq mi)
- Time zone: UTC+01:00 (CET)
  - Summer (DST): UTC+02:00 (CEST)
- INSEE/Postal code: 77108 /77500
- ^{1} French Land Register data, which excludes lakes, ponds, glaciers > 1 km^{2} (0.386 sq mi or 247 acres) and river estuaries.

Chelles (French pronunciation: [ʃɛl]) is a commune in the eastern suburbs of Paris, France. It is located in the Seine-et-Marne department in the Île-de-France region 18 km (11 mi) from the center of Paris.

== History ==
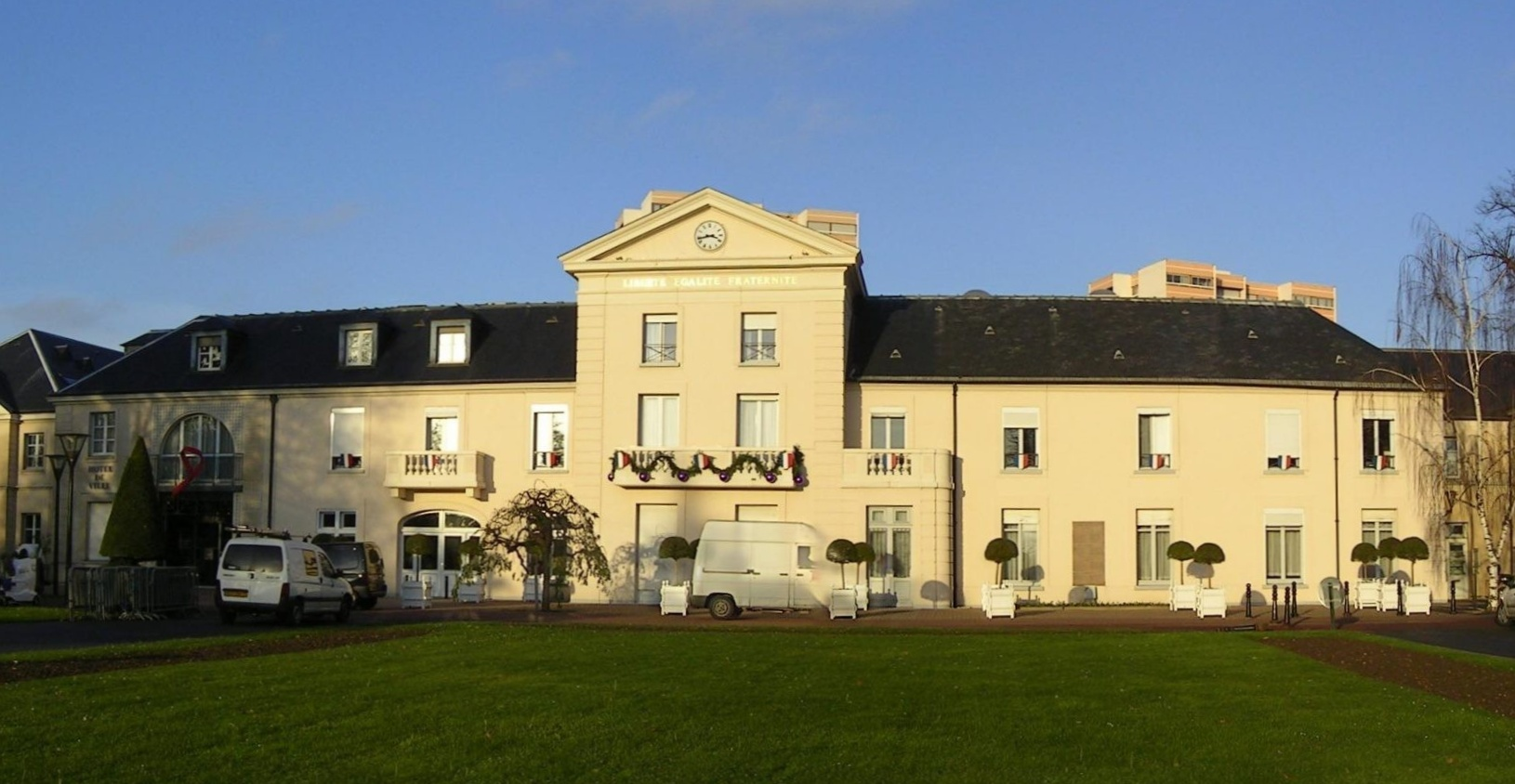
The Hôtel de Ville

Paleolithic artifacts were discovered by chance at Chelles by the pioneering nineteenth-century anthropologist Louis Laurent Gabriel de Mortillet (1821–1898); he named the corresponding cultural stage of the Paleolithic after the commune: «Chellean» or «Chellian», nowadays known as «Oldowan».

At the Merovingian villa of Calae the abbey of Notre-Dame-des-Chelles was founded by Balthild, a seventh-century queen of the Franks. It was largely demolished at the time of the French Revolution.

The Hôtel de Ville was acquired by the commune in 1937.

== Geography ==
There are two main streets in Chelles, Avenue Foch and Avenue de la Résistance.

== Demographics ==
The inhabitants are called Chellois in French.

Historical population

| Year | Pop. | ±% p.a. |
|---|---|---|
| 1793 | 1,110 | — |
| 1800 | 865 | −3.50% |
| 1806 | 1,241 | +6.20% |
| 1821 | 1,179 | −0.34% |
| 1831 | 1,413 | +1.83% |
| 1836 | 1,557 | +1.96% |
| 1841 | 1,632 | +0.95% |
| 1846 | 1,700 | +0.82% |
| 1851 | 1,700 | +0.00% |
| 1856 | 1,770 | +0.81% |
| 1861 | 1,914 | +1.58% |
| 1866 | 2,165 | +2.50% |
| 1872 | 2,150 | −0.12% |
| 1876 | 2,500 | +3.84% |
| 1881 | 2,702 | +1.57% |
| 1886 | 3,001 | +2.12% |
| 1891 | 2,911 | −0.61% |
| 1896 | 3,414 | +3.24% |
| 1901 | 3,952 | +2.97% |

| Year | Pop. | ±% p.a. |
|---|---|---|
| 1906 | 4,683 | +3.45% |
| 1911 | 5,367 | +2.76% |
| 1921 | 6,805 | +2.40% |
| 1926 | 9,716 | +7.38% |
| 1931 | 13,158 | +6.25% |
| 1936 | 14,658 | +2.18% |
| 1946 | 14,378 | −0.19% |
| 1954 | 19,539 | +3.91% |
| 1962 | 28,382 | +4.78% |
| 1968 | 33,281 | +2.69% |
| 1975 | 36,516 | +1.33% |
| 1982 | 41,838 | +1.96% |
| 1990 | 45,365 | +1.02% |
| 1999 | 45,399 | +0.01% |
| 2007 | 51,035 | +1.47% |
| 2012 | 53,247 | +0.85% |
| 2017 | 54,917 | +0.62% |
| 2023 | 54,620 | −0.09% |

Source: EHESS and INSEE (1968-2023)

== Transport ==
Chelles is served by Chelles–Gournay station on Paris RER line and on the Transilien Paris-Est suburban rail line.

== Education ==
As of 2016 the commune has 13,000 students in 46 public and private schools. The commune includes 19 public preschools and 16 public elementary schools.

There are also:

- Four public junior high schools: Collège Beau soleil, Collège Corot, Collège de l'Europe, Collège Pierre Weczerka and Collège Simone Veil - Beau Soleil and de l'Europe have Enseignement Général Professionnel Adapté (S.E.G.P.A) programmes
- Three public senior high schools/sixth-form colleges, Lycée Gaston Bachelard, Lycée Professionnel Louis Lumière, and Lycée Jehan de Chelles
- One private school - Institution Gasnier Guy, with private preschool and elementary school (Gasnier Guy / Ste Bathilde), junior high school (Collège Gasnier Guy), and senior high school (Lycée Gasnier Guy) divisions

Chelles includes a library, Bibliothèque Olympe de Gouges, and a media centre, Médiathèque Jean-Pierre Vernant.

== Culture and recreation ==
The commune includes the Musée Alfred-Bonno.

There is also a public swimming pool, and a public skate park which opened in 1999.

Chelles is twinned with the city of Lindau, Germany.

== Gallery ==
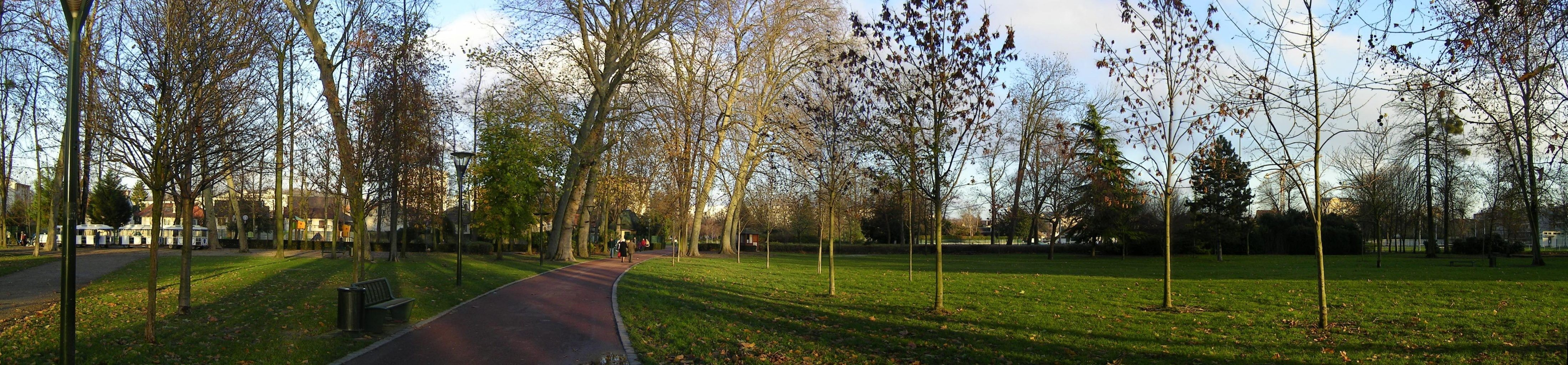
Parc Emile Fouchard

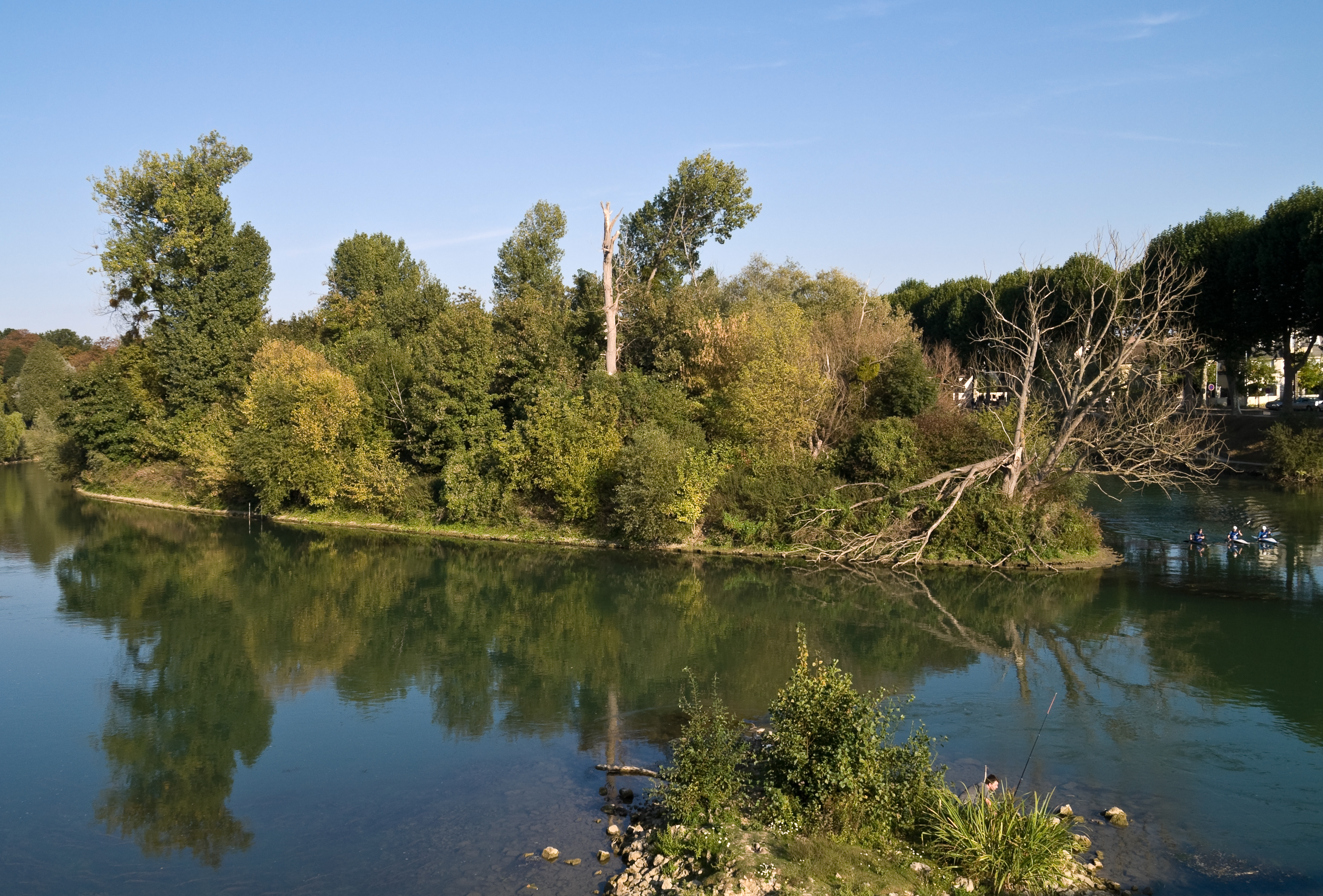
Île Refuge, in the Marne river, is part of the Local Nature Reserve of the islands of Chelles
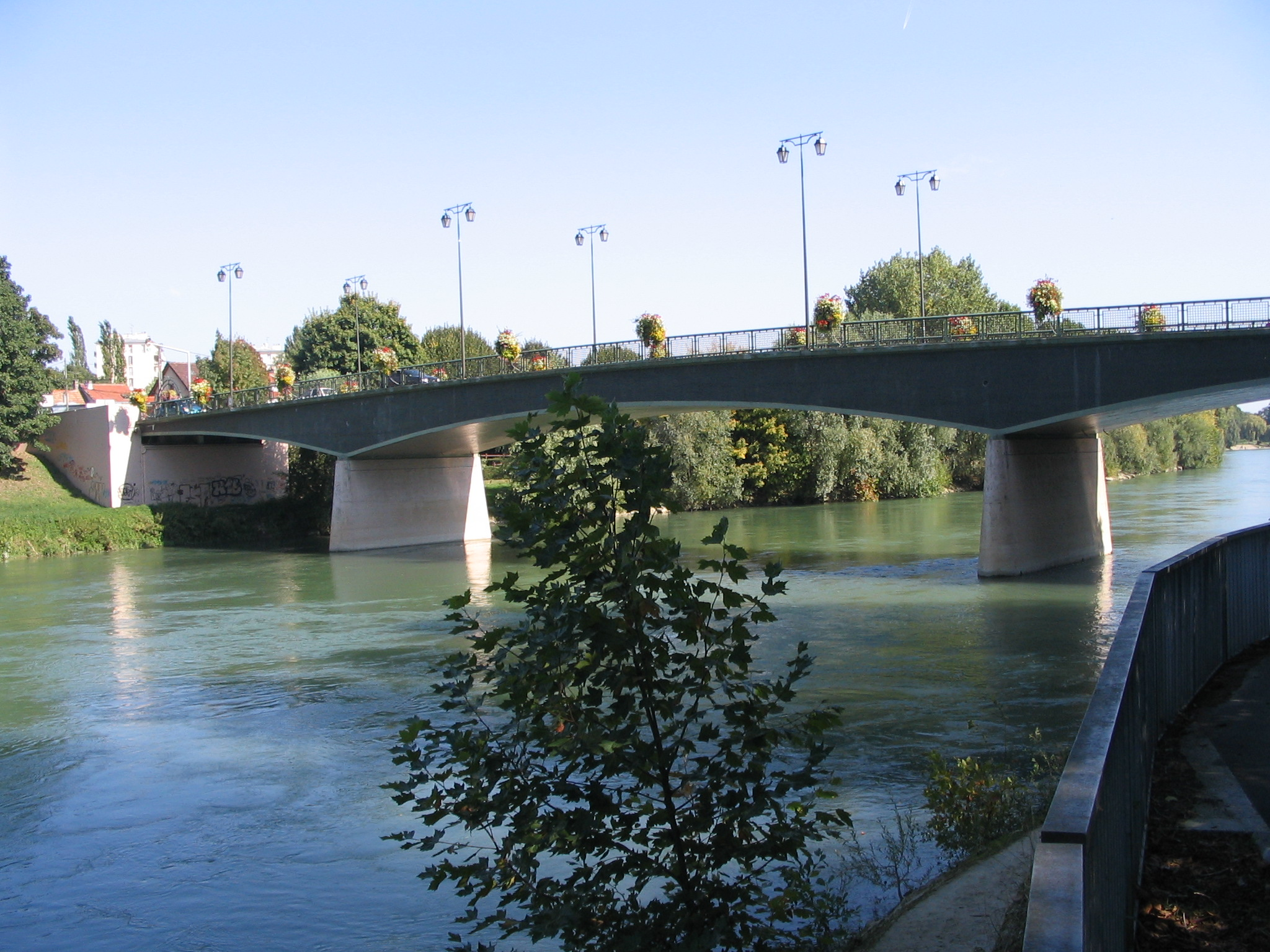

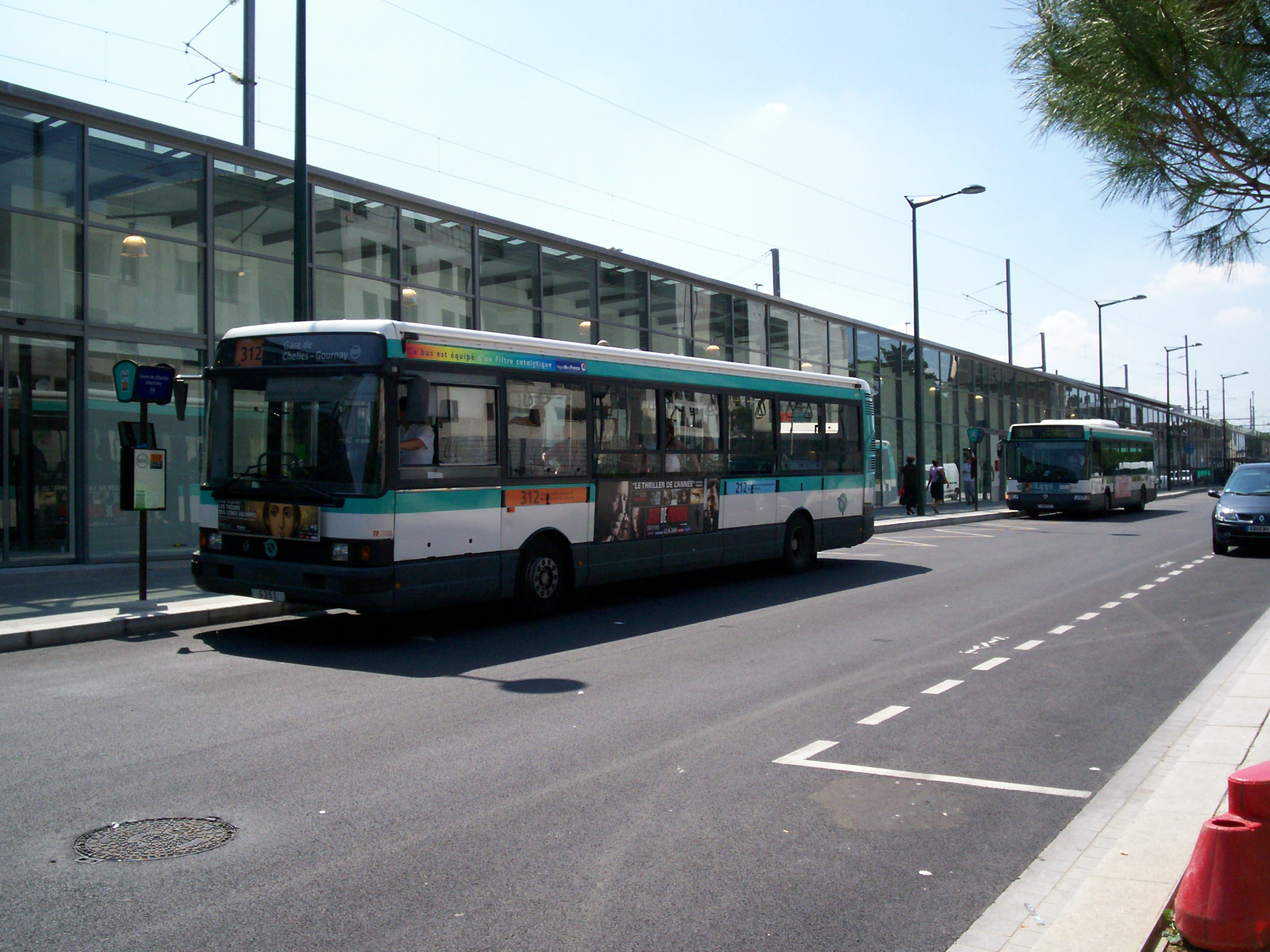
Chelles-Gournay train station

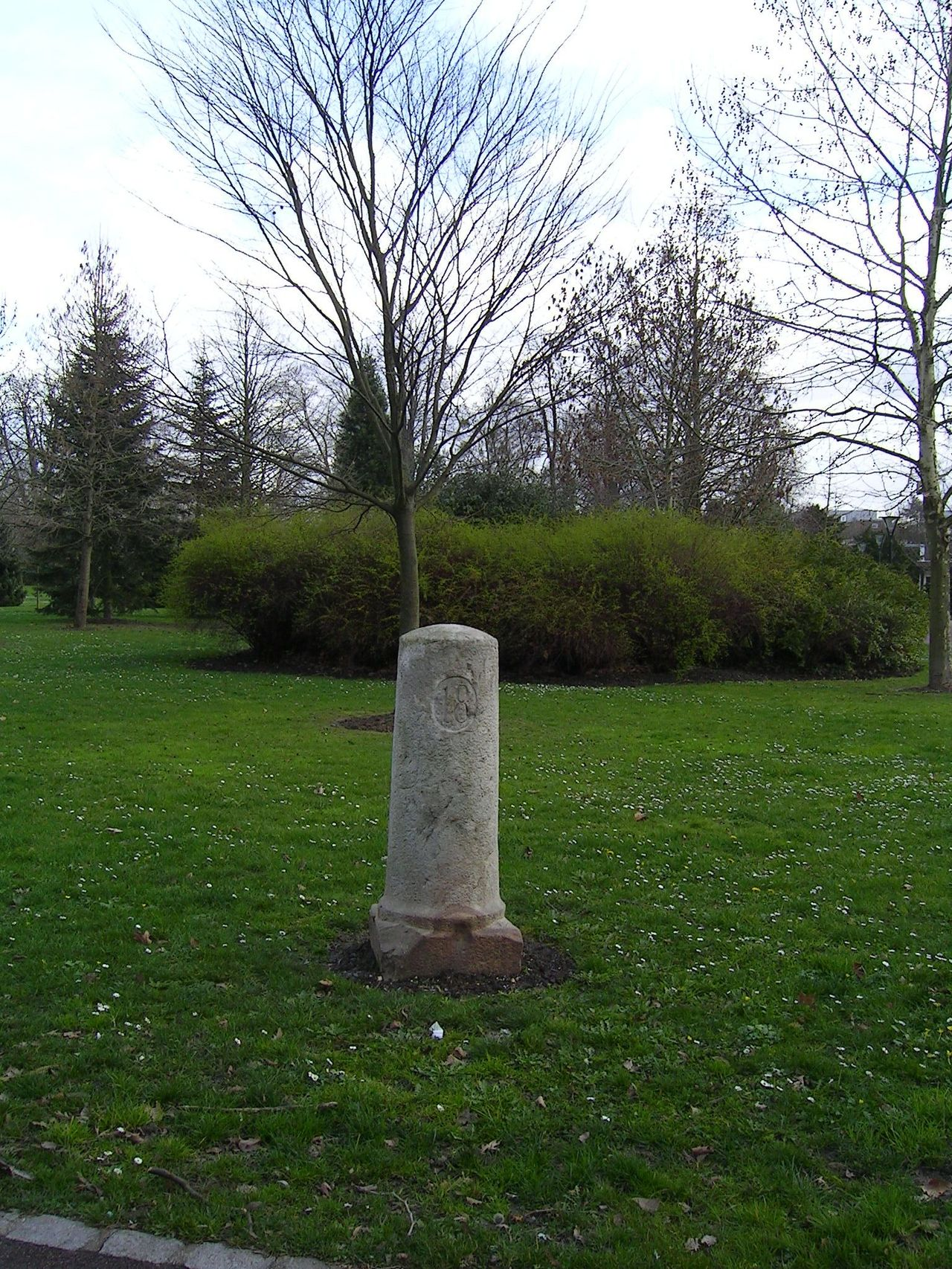
Where Roi Chilpéric was assassinated

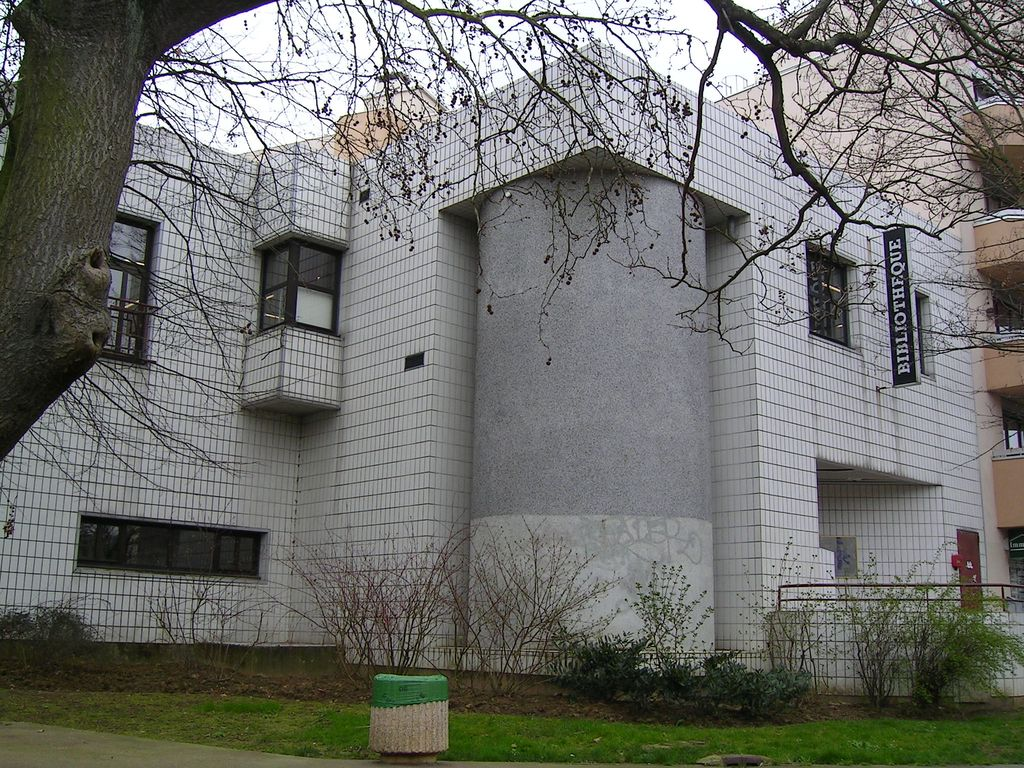
Georges Brassens Chelles Library

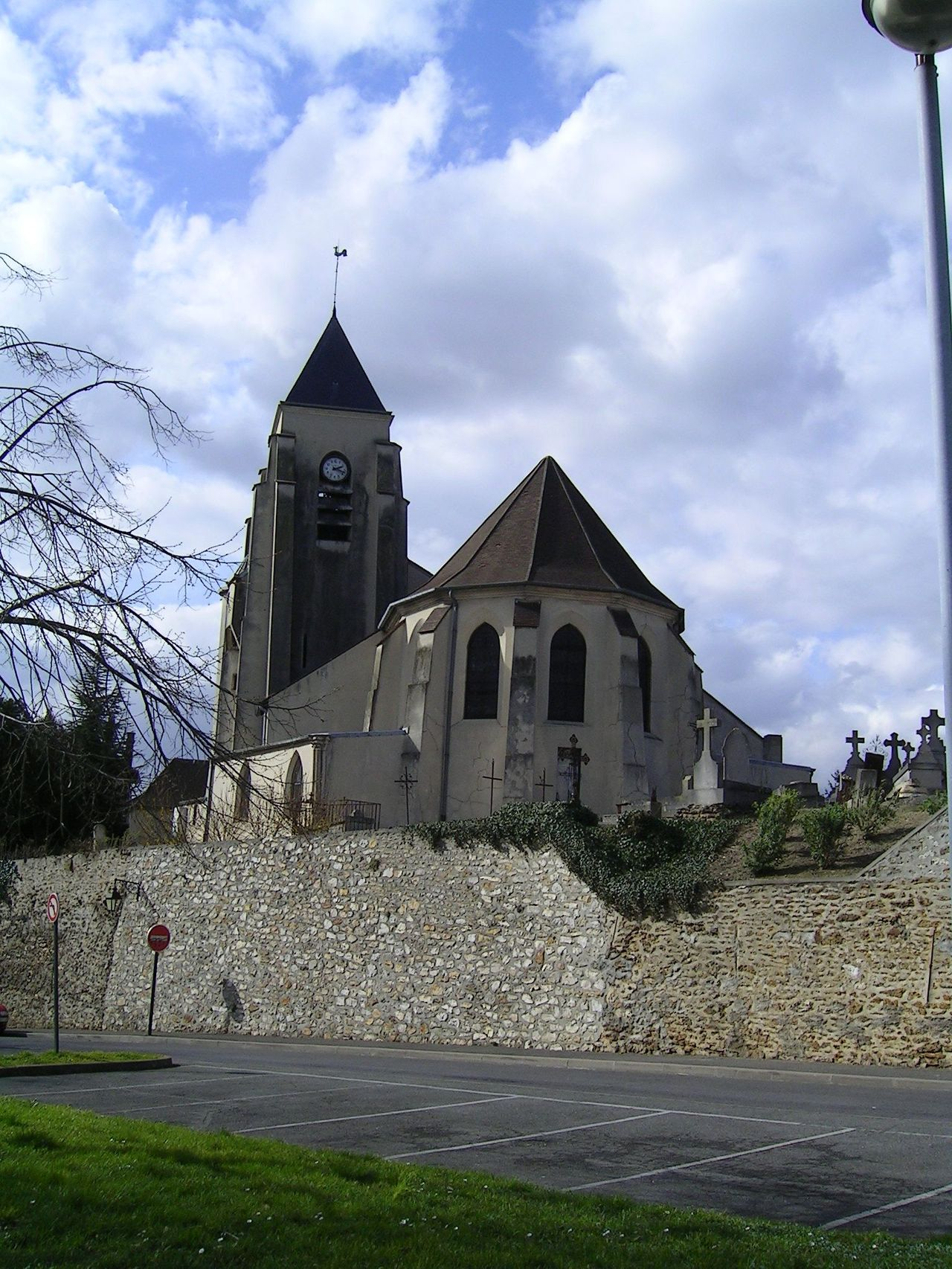
Saint-André Church and Cemetery

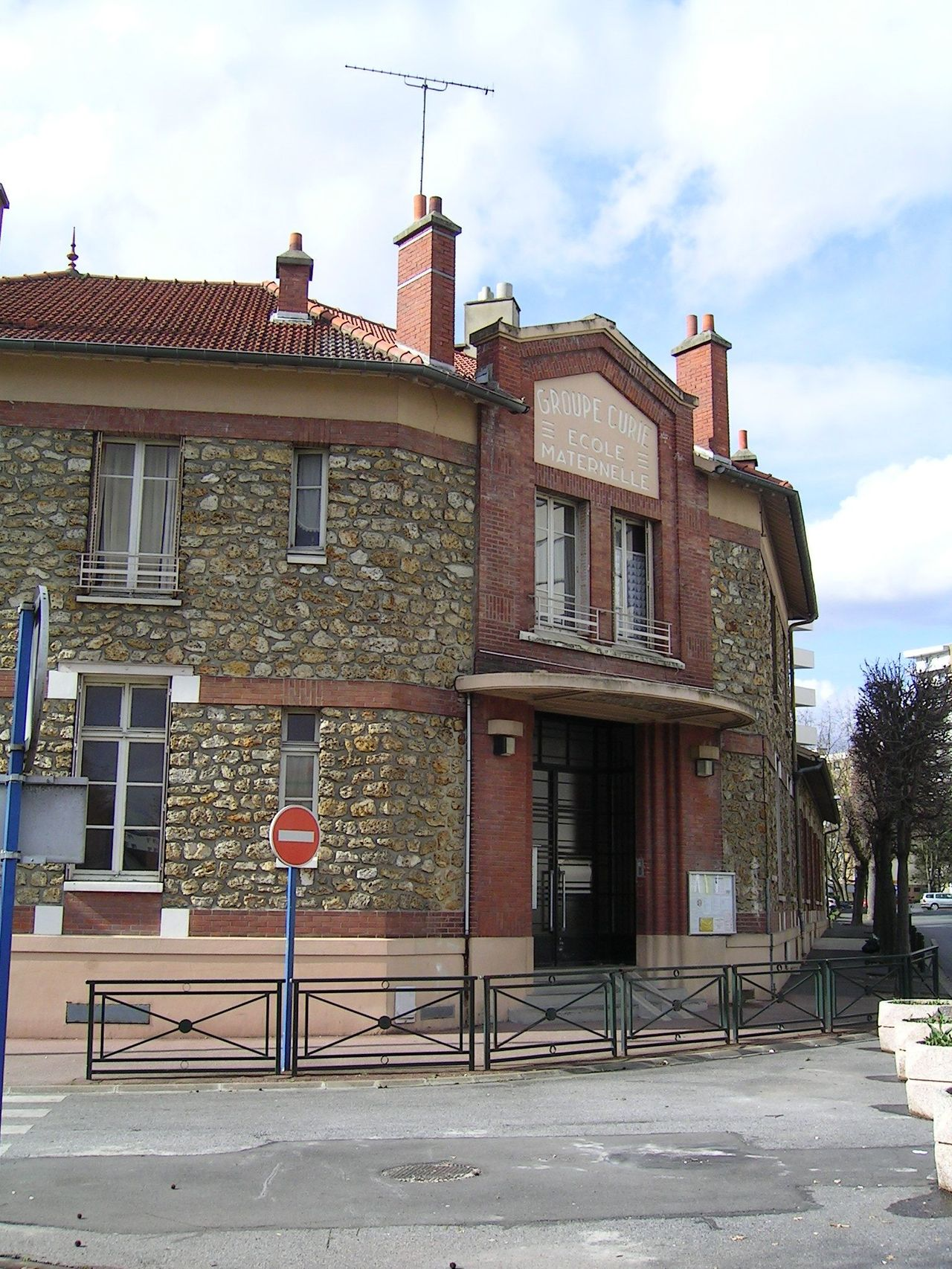
Curie nursery

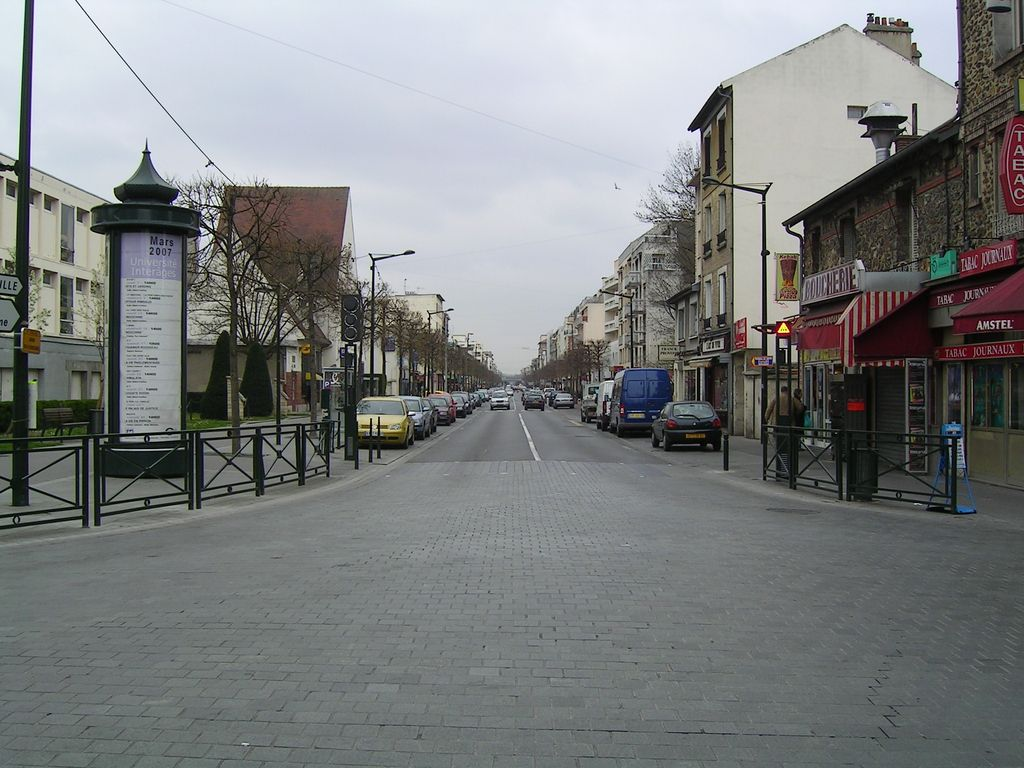
Avenue de la Résistance

== See also ==
- Communes of the Seine-et-Marne department
