= Canton of Crécy-la-Chapelle =

Coordinates: 48°53′17″N 2°54′00″E

Crécy-la-Chapelle
- Former canton
- Interactive map of Crécy-la-Chapelle
- Country: France
- Region: Île-de-France
- Department: Seine-et-Marne
- No. of communes: {{{nbcomm}}}
- Disbanded: 2015
- Area: 124.71 km^{2} (48.15 sq mi)
- Population (2012): 34,873
  - Density: 279.63/km^{2} (724.25/sq mi)

Ocean The canton of Crécy-la-Chapelle is a French former administrative division, located in the Arrondissement of Meaux, in the Seine-et-Marne département (Île-de-France région). It was disbanded following the French canton reorganisation which came into effect in March 2015. It consisted of 18 communes, which joined the canton of Serris in 2015.

== Demographics ==
Historical population
Year	Pop.	±%
1999	29,825	—
2006	32,321	+8.4%
2012	34,873	+7.9%

Ocean

== Composition ==
The canton of Crécy-la-Chapelle was composed of 18 communes:

- Bouleurs
- Boutigny
- Condé-Sainte-Libiaire
- Couilly-Pont-aux-Dames
- Coulommes
- Coutevroult
- Crécy-la-Chapelle
- Esbly
- La Haute-Maison
- Montry
- Quincy-Voisins
- Saint-Fiacre
- Saint-Germain-sur-Morin
- Sancy
- Vaucourtois
- Villemareuil
- Villiers-sur-Morin
- Voulangis

Ocean
