= Communauté de communes du Pays Créçois =

Federation of municipalities in Île-de-France, France

Coordinates: 48.86°N 2.91°E

Pays Créçois
- Former communauté de communes
- Country: France
- Region: Île-de-France
- Department: Seine-et-Marne
- No. of communes: {{{nbcomm}}}
- Established: 1992
- Disbanded: 2020

Government
  - President: Jacques Corpechot
- Area: 131.16 km^{2} (50.64 sq mi)
- Population (2014): 36,220
  - Density: 276.2/km^{2} (715.2/sq mi)
- Website: www.cc-payscrecois.fr

The Communauté de communes du Pays Créçois is a former federation of municipalities (communauté de communes) in the Seine-et-Marne département and in the Île-de-France région of France. It was created in February 1992. It was disbanded in January 2020, when 12 of its communes joined the Communauté d'agglomération Coulommiers Pays de Brie.

== Composition ==
The communauté de communes consisted of the following 19 communes:

1. Bouleurs
2. Boutigny
3. Condé-Sainte-Libiaire
4. Couilly-Pont-aux-Dames
5. Coulommes
6. Coutevroult
7. Crécy-la-Chapelle
8. Esbly
9. La Haute-Maison
10. Montry
11. Quincy-Voisins
12. Saint-Fiacre
13. Saint-Germain-sur-Morin
14. Sancy
15. Tigeaux
16. Vaucourtois
17. Villemareuil
18. Villiers-sur-Morin
19. Voulangis

== See also ==
- Communes of the Seine-et-Marne department
