= A4 autoroute =

French motorway connecting Paris and Strasbourg

A4 autoroute
- Autoroute de l'Est

Route information
- Part of E17 / E25 / E46 / E50
- Length: 476.6 km (296.1 mi)
- Existed: 1974–present

Major junctions
- West end: E54 in Paris (Porte de Bercy)

- E15 / E50 Boulevard Périphérique in Paris: A 86 in Joinville-le-Pont and Nogent-sur-Marne; A 104 in Collégien; A 140 in Meaux; E17 / E46 / A 26 in Reims; E46 / A 34 in Reims; E17 / A 26 in La Veuve; E25 / A 31 in Metz; A 315 in Metz; A 314 in Metz; E50 / A 320 in Freyming-Merlebach; A 340 in Brumath; A 35 & E25 / A 355 in Vendenheim
- East end: Strasbourg

Location
- Country: France

Highway system
- Roads in France; Autoroutes; Routes nationales

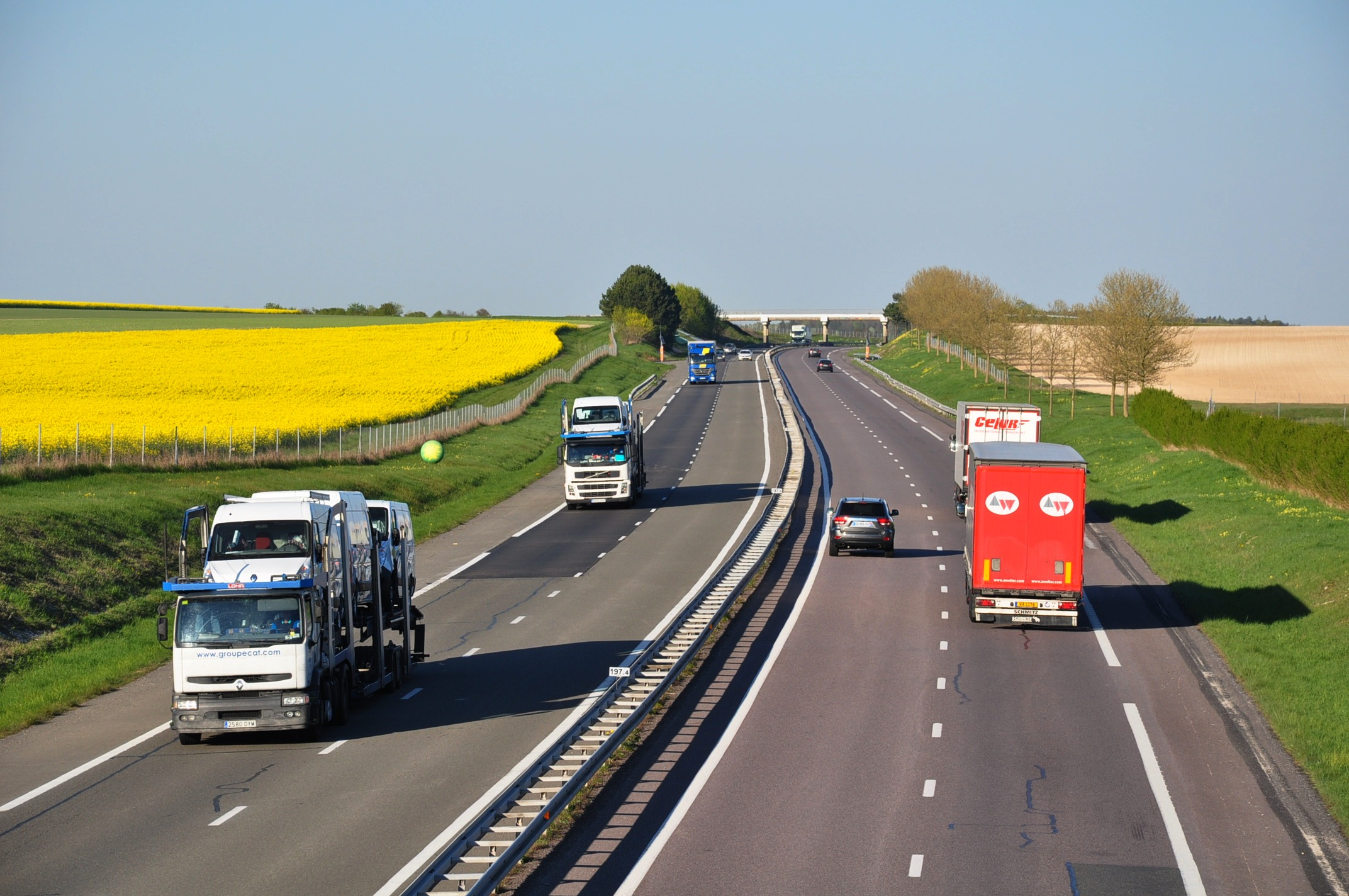
The A4 near Auve in the Marne department.

The A4 Autoroute, also known as autoroute de l'Est (English: Motorway of the East), is a French autoroute that travels 476.6 km (296.1 mi) between the cities of Paris and Strasbourg. It forms parts of European routes E17, E25, E46 and E50. It is France's second longest after the A10 autoroute.

Its construction began in the 1970s near Paris. The first section between Porte de Bercy, in the south part of Paris and Joinville-le-Pont opened in 1974 with a single carriageway. A second carriageway was added in 1975, and the following sections between Joinville and Metz were opened in 1975 and 1976. Former autoroutes A320 and A34 were integrated into the A4 in 1982. The A32 was renamed to A320 in 1996.

From Paris, the autoroute passes the new town of Marne-la-Vallée and Disneyland Paris. It continues on to some of the major cities of France's northeast, including Reims and Metz, before terminating in Strasbourg. Local roads provide a connection to southern Germany.

Its westernmost part between the Périphérique and the A86 ring road in Paris is reputed to be one of the busiest sections of road in Europe, with 257,000 vehicles a day recorded in 2002.

== History ==
Segment Terminus	Segment Terminus	Construction Year	Notes
Porte de Bercy	Saint-Maurice	1974 (first carriageway)
Porte de Bercy	Saint-Maurice	1974 (second carriageway)
Saint-Maurice	Joinville-le-Pont	1974 (first carriageway)
Saint-Maurice	Joinville-le-Pont	1975 (second carriageway)
Joinville	Coutevroult	1976
Coutevroult	Bouleurs	1975
Bouleurs	Château-Thierry	1976
Château-Thierry	Tinqueux	1975
Tinqueux	Les Islettes	1976
Les Islettes	A 31	1975
A 31	Metz (east)	1976
Metz (east)	Merlebach	1971	formerly A 32
Merlebach	Mundolsheim	1976
Mundolsheim	Strasbourg	1972
Ormes	Taissy	2010	Contournement sud de Reims / replaces old road

== List of Exits and Junctions ==
Region	Department	km	mi	Junctions	Destinations	Notes
Île-de-France	Paris	0.0	0.0	Boulevard Périphérique - A4 / Paris - centre	Périphérique Nord : Lille (A3 - A1); Périphérique Sud : Lyon (A6 (A10)), Rouen (A13), Quai d'Ivry + Porte de Bercy	
Île-de-France	Paris	0.0	0.0	Boulevard Périphérique - A4 / Paris - centre	Paris - centre : Gare de Lyon	
Île-de-France	Val-de-Marne	0,9	0.56	1 : Ivry-sur-Seine	Ivry-sur-Seine	Entry and exit only from Strasbourg
Île-de-France	Val-de-Marne	2.0	1.24	2 : Charenton	Charenton - centre, Bercy	Exit from Strasbourg
Île-de-France	Val-de-Marne	2.0	1.24	3 : Saint-Maurice	Charenton-le-Pont - Gravelle, Maisons-Alfort, Alfortville, Saint-Maurice	
Île-de-France	Val-de-Marne	3.6	2.23	A86 (Southbound) - A4	Bordeaux, Nantes, (A6 - A10), Créteil, Versailles	
Île-de-France	Val-de-Marne	4.0	2.48	4 : Joinville	St-Maur, Joinville, Vincennes	
Île-de-France	Val-de-Marne	7.2	4.47	A86 (Northbound) - A4	Lille (A1), Bobigny (A3), Fontenay-sous-Bois, Le Perreux-sur-Marne	Entry and exit only from Paris
Île-de-France	Val-de-Marne	7.4	4.59	5 : Pont de Nogent	Nogent-sur-Marne, Champigny-sur-Marne - La Fourchette, Le Perreux-sur-Marne, Fontenay-sous-Bois, Bobigny	
Île-de-France	Val-de-Marne	9.0	5.59	6 : Champigny-sur-Marne	Champigny - centre, Bry-sur-Marne	Entry and exit only from Paris
Île-de-France	Seine-Saint-Denis	12	7.45	8 : Porte de Paris	Noisy-le-Grand - centre, Mont-d'Est, Marne-la-Vallée - Porte de Paris, Villiers-sur-Marne, Le Plessis-Trévise, Bry-sur-Marne, Centres Commerciaux	
Île-de-France	Seine-Saint-Denis	14	8.69	9 : Noisy-le-Grand - centre	Noisy-le-Grand	Entry and exit only from Strasbourg
Île-de-France	Seine-Saint-Denis	15	9.32	10 : Cité Descartes	Marne-la-Vallée, Chelles, Noisy-le-Grand - Richardets, Champs-sur-Marne	
Île-de-France	Seine-et-Marne					
Île-de-France	Seine-et-Marne	17	10.5	RN 104 & RD 499 - A4	Troyes, Nancy par RN, Lyon (A5), Bordeaux (A10), Sénart, Évry, Marne-la-Vallée - Val Maubuée-centre, Pontault-Combault, Émerainville	
Île-de-France	Seine-et-Marne	17	10.5	RN 104 & RD 499 - A4	Torcy, Noisiel, Val-Maubuée - centre	
Île-de-France	Seine-et-Marne	19	11.8	10.1 : Val Maubuée - sud	Marne-la-Vallée, Lognes, Z. A. Pariest, Croissy-Beaubourg	
Île-de-France	Seine-et-Marne	20	12.4	A104 & RD 471 - A4	Lille, Ch-de-Gaulle (A1), Lagny-sur-Marne, Collégien - centre, Centre Commercial Régional Bay 2	
Île-de-France	Seine-et-Marne	20	12.4	A104 & RD 471 - A4	Gretz-Armainvilliers, Tournan-en-Brie, Collégien - Z. A	
Île-de-France	Seine-et-Marne	24	14.9	12 : Val de Bussy	Marne-la-Vallée, Bussy-Saint-Georges, Ferrières-en-Brie, Collégien	
Île-de-France	Seine-et-Marne	Aire de Ferrières (Eastbound); Aire de Bussy-Saint-Georges (Westbound)				
Île-de-France	Seine-et-Marne	28	17.4	12.1 : Val d'Europe	Marne-la-Vallée, Montévrain, Centre Commercial Régional Val d'Europe	Entry and exit only from Paris
Île-de-France	Seine-et-Marne	30	18.6	13 : Serris	Marne-la-Vallée - Val de Lagny, Provins, Serris	
Île-de-France	Seine-et-Marne	32	19.8	14 : Parcs Disney	Marne-la-Vallée - Val d'Europe, Bailly-Romainvilliers, Centre Commercial Régional Val d'Europe	
Île-de-France	Seine-et-Marne	Péage de Coutevroult				
Île-de-France	Seine-et-Marne	36	22.36	15 : Coutevroult	Coutevroult, Crécy-la-Chapelle, Melun, Provins, Fontenay-Trésigny	Entry and exit only from Strasbourg
Île-de-France	Seine-et-Marne	38	23.61	16 : Crécy-la-Chapelle	Couilly-Pont-aux-Dames, Crécy-la-Chapelle, Coulommiers, Esbly	Entry and exit only from Paris
Île-de-France	Seine-et-Marne	40	24.8	A140 - A4	Meaux - centre, Quincy-Voisins	
Île-de-France	Seine-et-Marne	Aire de Vaucourtois (Eastbound); Aire de Prévilliers (Westbound)				
Île-de-France	Seine-et-Marne	54	33.5	18 : Saint-Jean-les-Deux-Jumeaux	Saint-Jean-les-Deux-Jumeaux, Sammeron, Meaux - est, La Ferté-sous-Jouarre, Trilport	
Île-de-France	Seine-et-Marne	Aire d'Ussy-sur-Marne (Eastbound); Aire de Changis-sur-Marne (Westbound)				
Île-de-France	Seine-et-Marne	Péage de Montreuil-aux-Lions				
Île-de-France	Seine-et-Marne	65	40.4	19 : Montreuil-aux-Lions	Montreuil-aux-Lions, Lizy-sur-Ourcq, La Ferté-sous-Jouarre	
Hauts-de-France	Aisne	Aire de La Fontenelle (Eastbound); Aire de La Talmousse (Westbound)				
Hauts-de-France	Aisne	85	52.8	20 : Château-Thierry	Château-Thierry, Soissons, Fère-en-Tardenois	
Hauts-de-France	Aisne	Aires de Tardenois				
Hauts-de-France	Aisne	111	68.8	21 : Dormans	Épernay, Fismes, Dormans, Fère-en-Tardenois	
Grand Est	Marne					
Grand Est	Marne	Aire de Romigny (Eastbound); Aire de Lhéry (Westbound)				
Grand Est	Marne	Aire de Vrigny (Eastbound); Aire de Gueux (Westbound)				
Grand Est	Marne	131	81.4	22 : Reims - Thillois (A344)	Reims - centre, Tinqueux, Soissons	
Grand Est	Marne	133	82.6	A26 (Northbound) - A4	Reims - nord, Lille, Bruxelles, Calais, Laon, Saint-Quentin, Cambrai, Rouen	
Grand Est	Marne	E50 / A 4 becomes E17 / E46 / E50 / A 4				
Grand Est	Marne	138	85.7	23 : Reims - sud	Reims, Épernay, Champfleury, Champagne-Ardenne, Centre Hospitalier de Reims	
Grand Est	Marne	144	89.5	A34 - A4	Charleroi, Cormontreuil, Reims - est, Charleville-Mézières	
Grand Est	Marne	E17 / E46 / E50 / A 4 becomes E17 / E50 / A 4				
Grand Est	Marne	Aire de l'Espérance (Eastbound); Aire de la Vesle (Westbound)				
Grand Est	Marne	Aires de Reims-Champagne				
Grand Est	Marne	167	103.7	A26 (Southbound) - A4	Troyes, Lyon, Orléans (A5), Châlons-en-Champagne - Rive Gauche, Épernay	
Grand Est	Marne	E17 / E46 / E50 / A 4 becomes E50 / A 4				
Grand Est	Marne	171	106.2	24 : La Veuve	La Veuve, Châlons-en-Champagne - centre, Saint Martin, Vitry-le-François, Mourmelon-le-Grand	
Grand Est	Marne	111.8	75.1	25 : Saint-Étienne-au-Temple	Saint-Étienne-au-Temple, Bar-le-Duc, Châlons-en-Champagne - centre, Mont Bernard, Suippes	
Grand Est	Marne	Aire du Mont-Charme (Eastbound); Aire de la Noblette (Eastbound)				
Grand Est	Marne	Aire de Valmy-Orbeval (Eastbound); Aire de Valmy-Le Moulin (Westbound)				
Grand Est	Marne	213	132.3	26 : Sainte-Menehould	Sainte-Menehould, Vouziers, Vitry-le-François	
Grand Est	Marne	Aires de Fontaine d'Olive				
Grand Est	Meuse	228	141.6	27 : Clermont-en-Argonne	Clermont-en-Argonne	
Grand Est	Meuse	Aire de Rarécourt (Eastbound); Aire de Jubécourt (Westbound)				
Grand Est	Meuse	243	150.9	28 : Voie Sacrée	Verdun, Bar-le-Duc, Saint-Mihiel	
Grand Est	Meuse	Aire La Rouge Haie (Eastbound); Aire de Genièvres (Westbound)				
Grand Est	Meuse	254	157.8	29 : Verdun	Verdun, Saint-Mihiel	Entry and exit only from Strasbourg
Grand Est	Meuse	Aires de Verdun Saint-Nicolas				
Grand Est	Meuse	271	168.4	30 : Fresnes-en-Woëvre	Fresnes-en-Woëvre, Longwy, Pont-à-Mousson, Lac de Madine, Étain, Vigneulles-lès-Hattonchâtel	
Grand Est	Meuse	Aire de l'Épinotte (Eastbound); Aire du Bois de la Ronce (Westbound)				
Grand Est	Meurthe-et-Moselle	Aire du Bois de Labry (Eastbound); Aire du Bois-saint-Martin (Westbound)				
Grand Est	Meurthe-et-Moselle	293	182.0	31 : Jarny	Jarny, Briey	
Grand Est	Meurthe-et-Moselle	Péage de Beaumont				
Grand Est	Moselle	300	186.4	32 / 32a /32b : Batilly / Sainte-Marie-aux-Chênes	Z. I. Batilly, Ars-sur-Moselle, Sainte-Marie-aux-Chênes, Homécourt, Auboué	
Grand Est	Moselle	Aires de Metz St-Privat				
Grand Est	Moselle	312	193.8	33 : Marange-Silvange	Marange-Silvange, Rombas	
Grand Est	Moselle	313	194.4	34 : Semécourt	Amnéville, Parc Walygator, Woippy, Maizières-lès-Metz, Semécourt	
Grand Est	Moselle	315	195.7	A31 - A4 : Croix de Hauconcourt	A30, La Maxe, Thionville, Luxembourg, Nancy, Metz - centre, Longwy, Trèves (Germany)	
Grand Est	Moselle	E50 / A 4 becomes E25 / E50 / A 4				
Grand Est	Moselle	318	197.5	35 : Argancy	Argancy, Ennery, EuroTransit	
Grand Est	Moselle	Aire de la Crouée (Eastbound); Aire de Charly-Oradour (Westbound)				
Grand Est	Moselle	326	202.5	A315 - A4 : Bifurcation de Mey	Nancy (A31), Metz - est, Château-Salins, Hôpitaux	Entry and exit only from Paris
Grand Est	Moselle	328	203.8	A314 - A4 : Bifurcation de Lauvallières	Metz, Nancy (A31)	Entry and exit only from Strasbourg
Grand Est	Moselle	Aires de Landonvillers				
Grand Est	Moselle	344	213.7	36 : Boulay	Boulay, Bouzonville, Faulquemont	1st motorway toll in France totally without barrier
Grand Est	Moselle	Aire de Brouck (Eastbound); Aire de Narbéfontaine (Westbound)				
Grand Est	Moselle	Aires de Longeville				
Grand Est	Moselle	Péage de Saint-Avold				
Grand Est	Moselle	362	224.9	37 : Saint-Avold	Saarlouis (Germany), Saint-Avold, Carling, Creutzwald, Faulquemont	
Grand Est	Moselle	369	229.2	A320 - A4 + 38 : Freyming	Saarbrücken (Germany), Forbach, Merlebach	
Grand Est	Moselle	369	229.2	A320 - A4 + 38 : Freyming	Freyming-Merlebach	
Grand Est	Moselle	E25 / E50 / A 4 becomes E25 / A 4				
Grand Est	Moselle	375	233.0	39 : Farébersviller	Farébersviller	
Grand Est	Moselle	Péage de Loupershouse				
Grand Est	Moselle	381	236.7	40 : Puttelange	Puttelange-aux-Lacs, Loupershouse	Entry and exit only from Paris
Grand Est	Moselle	Aire de Grundviller (Eastbound); Aire de Petite Hambach (Westbound)				
Grand Est	Moselle	390	242.33	41 : Sarreguemines	Sarreguemines, Sarralbe, Europôle	
Grand Est	Moselle	Aires de Keskastel				
Grand Est	Bas-Rhin	408	253.5	42 : Sarre-Union	Sarre-Union, Diemeringen, Drulingen, Sarralbe	
Grand Est	Bas-Rhin	Aire de Eywiller (Eastbound); Aire de Berg (Westbound)				
Grand Est	Moselle	Aire de Katzenkopf (Eastbound); Aire de Schalbach (Westbound)				
Grand Est	Moselle	428	265.9	43 : Phalsbourg	Lunéville, Nancy, Phalsbourg, Sarrebourg	
Grand Est	Bas-Rhin	Aire de Danne (Eastbound); Aire de Quatre-Vents (Eastbound)				
Grand Est	Bas-Rhin	Aire de Saverne-Monswiller (Eastbound); Aire de Saverne-Eckartswille (Westbound)				
Grand Est	Bas-Rhin	439	272.7	44 : Saverne	Saverne, Bouxwiller, Molsheim	
Grand Est	Bas-Rhin	Aire de Gottesheim (Eastbound); Aire de Lienbach (Westbound)				
Grand Est	Bas-Rhin	456	283.3	45 : Hochfelden	Hochfelden, Bouxwiller	
Grand Est	Bas-Rhin	Péage de Schwindratzheim				
Grand Est	Bas-Rhin	463	287.6	46 : Haguenau	Haguenau, Brumath - Z. I. Nord	
Grand Est	Bas-Rhin	Aires de Brumath				
Grand Est	Bas-Rhin	468	290.0	47 : Brumath	Brumath - Z. A. Sud, Vendenheim	
Grand Est	Bas-Rhin	470	292.0	A35 (Northbound) & A355 - A4	Lauterbourg, Hœrdt, Ludwigshafen, Mannheim, Karlsruhe (Germany)	
Grand Est	Bas-Rhin	470	292.0	A35 (Northbound) & A355 - A4	Mulhouse (A35 Southbound), Port de Strasbourg, Aéroport de Strasbourg-Entzheim	
Grand Est	Bas-Rhin	E25 / A 4 becomes A 4				
Grand Est	Bas-Rhin	A 4 becomes M 35				
1.000 mi = 1.609 km; 1.000 km = 0.621 mi

== European Routes ==
European Route	Location
E50	Boulevard Périphérique through A 320
E17	A 26 (north) through A 26 (south)
E46	A 26 through A 34
E25	A 31 through A 355
