= Voisins =

Voisins is the name or part of the name of two communes of France:

- Voisins-le-Bretonneux, in the Yvelines département
- Quincy-Voisins, in the Seine-et-Marne département
