= Émile Galet =

Belgian army officer

Lt Gen Émile Galet
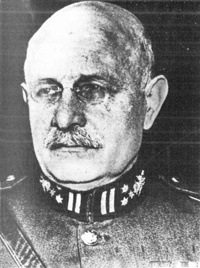
- Birth name: Émile-Joseph Galet
- Born: 17 December 1870 Erpion, Hainaut Province, Belgium
- Died: 26 November 1940 (aged 69) Brussels, Brabant Province, Belgium
- Allegiance: Belgium
- Rank: Chief of the General Staff
- Battles / wars: World War I

Lieutenant-General Émile-Joseph Galet (1870 – 1940) was a Belgian army officer who served as personal military advisor to King Albert I in World War I and later from 1926 to 1932.

== Biography ==
Émile Joseph Galet was born in Erpion, Hainaut Province on 17 December 1870, the son of a clog maker. At age 18, he joined the Belgian Army as a militiaman during a period "when the nefarious system of drawing lots prevailed, the new recruit being the unlucky loser in the draw." Men of his village helped pay for his studies at the École militaire," Galet entering as a sous-officier in the artillery.

In 1894, Galet was commissioned as an officer, and his expertise on technical artillery use marked him out among his contemporaries. Although a classmate of Albert at the École militaire, it was only later that the king again encountered "this demon for work," now a staff major and lecturer at the École de Guerre. "He was an excellent teacher, and his lectures were always to the point. According to Albert, "He makes everything as clear as daylight." From that time on, Galet and Albert became friends, and Galet was attached to Albert in maneuvers in 1906, 1908 and 1909. His views on the importance of artillery in defensive warfare clashing with the dominant preference for the offensive in contemporary military thinking.

Galet was "a Protestant mystic and read his Bible devoutly; his voluntary conversion, extremely conspicuous in a country where secularity is the only rival to Catholicism, made him unique in Belgium. He lived the life of a hermit, always absorbed in his studies which were exclusively military; he never laughed--it seemed he had no time for laughter, and, the soul of integrity himself, he respected the convictions of others."

Although at the time of World War I, Galet was still only a captain-commandant, he enjoyed the confidence of Albert and served as his unofficial military advisor during the period of fighting on the Yser Front.

In the aftermath of the war, he was appointed as head of the Royal Military Academy in Brussels. He replaced Henry Maglinse as Chief of the General Staff on 22 January 1926. He retired from service on 26 December 1932. In 1931, a book titled S.M. le Roi Albert was published under Galet's name, with a preface written by the King. In this memoir about the king, he also defended the tactical decisions he argued on behalf of during World War I.

Galet was recalled from retirement at the time of the German invasion of Belgium in May 1940 and served, briefly, as head of the Belgian Military Mission at France's Grand Quartier Général. He died in Brussels shortly afterwards on 26 November 1940.
