= Talange =

- Commune
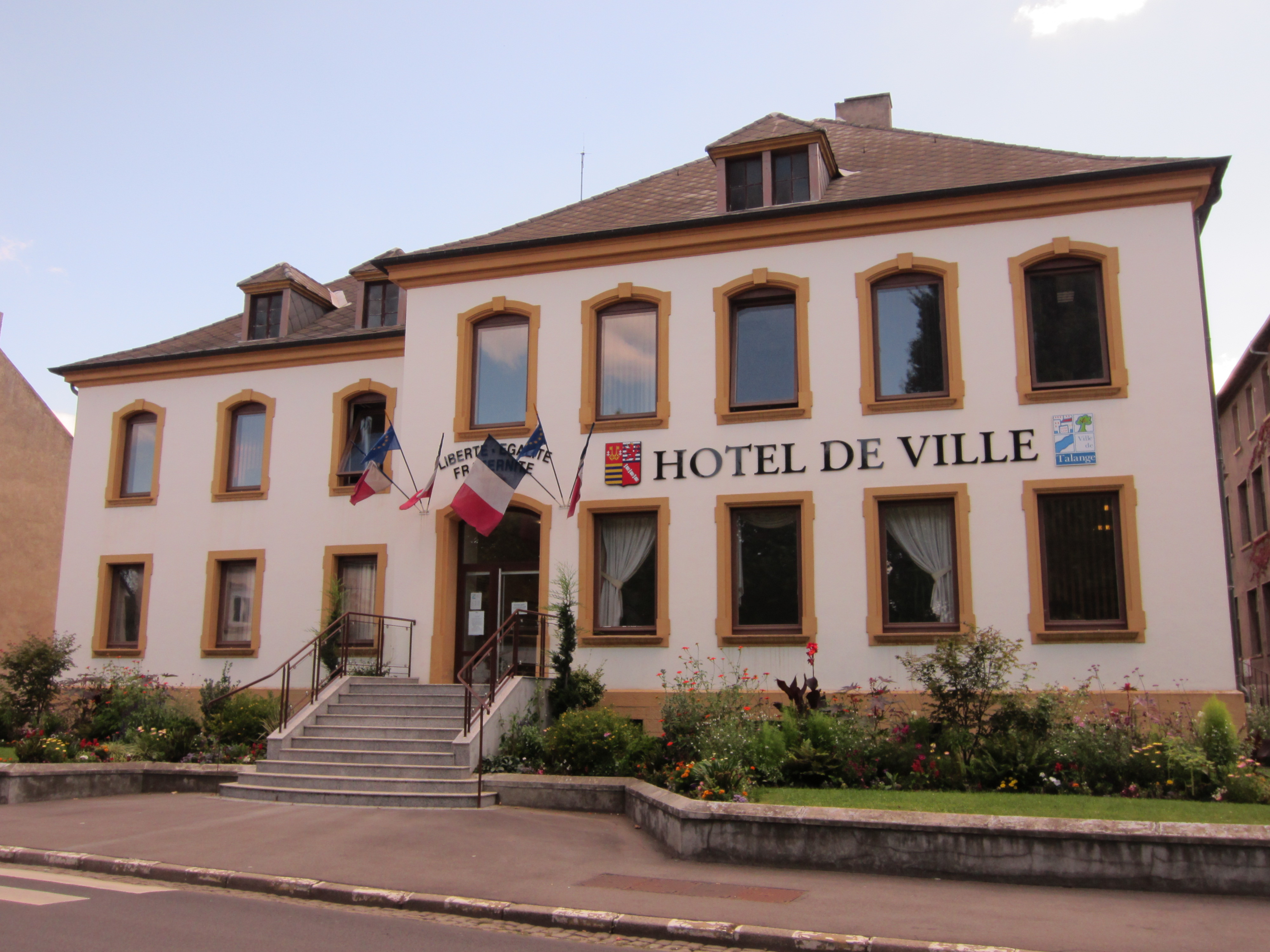
- The town hall in Talange

- Coat of arms
- Location of Talange
- Location within France Location within Grand Est
- Coordinates: 49°14′14″N 6°10′30″E
- Country: France
- Region: Grand Est
- Department: Moselle
- Arrondissement: Metz
- Canton: Le Sillon Mosellan
- Intercommunality: CC Rives de Moselle

Government
  - Mayor (2020–2026): Patrick Abate
- Area^{1}: 3.70 km^{2} (1.43 sq mi)
- Elevation: 160 m (520 ft)
- Highest elevation: 184 m (604 ft)
- Lowest elevation: 154 m (505 ft)
- Population (2023): 8,120
  - Density: 2,190/km^{2} (5,680/sq mi)
- Time zone: UTC+01:00 (CET)
  - Summer (DST): UTC+02:00 (CEST)
- INSEE/Postal code: 57663 /57525
- ^{1} French Land Register data, which excludes lakes, ponds, glaciers > 1 km^{2} (0.386 sq mi or 247 acres) and river estuaries.

Talange (French pronunciation: [talɑ̃ʒ]; German: Talingen; Lorraine Franconian: Taléng/Taléngen) is a commune in the Moselle department in Grand Est in north-eastern France.

== Population ==
Historical population
Year	Pop.	±% p.a.
1968	6,985	—
1975	8,176	+2.27%
1982	8,325	+0.26%
1990	7,755	−0.88%
1999	7,782	+0.04%
2007	7,549	−0.38%
2012	7,581	+0.08%
2017	7,707	+0.33%
2023	8,120	+0.87%
Source: INSEE

== See also ==
- Communes of the Moselle department
