= Tigeaux =

- Commune
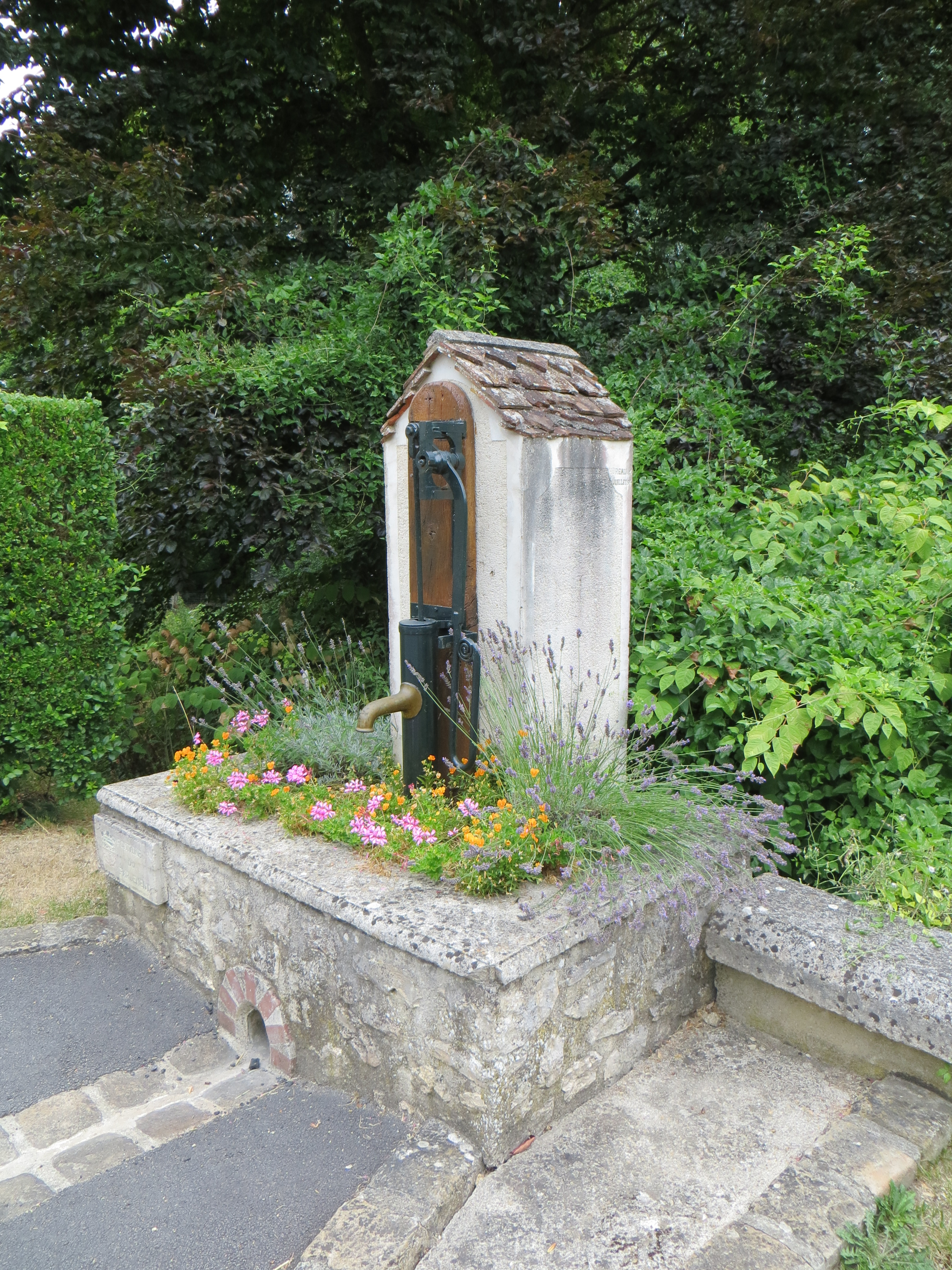
- The fountain in Tigeaux

- Coat of arms
- Location of Tigeaux
- Location within France Location within Île-de-France (region)
- Coordinates: 48°49′39″N 2°54′04″E
- Country: France
- Region: Île-de-France
- Department: Seine-et-Marne
- Arrondissement: Meaux
- Canton: Serris
- Intercommunality: CA Coulommiers Pays de Brie

Government
  - Mayor (2020–2026): Francis Poisson
- Area^{1}: 6.12 km^{2} (2.36 sq mi)
- Highest elevation: 130 m (430 ft)
- Lowest elevation: 50 m (160 ft)
- Population (2023): 421
  - Density: 68.8/km^{2} (178/sq mi)
- Time zone: UTC+01:00 (CET)
  - Summer (DST): UTC+02:00 (CEST)
- INSEE/Postal code: 77466 /77163
- ^{1} French Land Register data, which excludes lakes, ponds, glaciers > 1 km^{2} (0.386 sq mi or 247 acres) and river estuaries.

Tigeaux (French pronunciation: [tiʒo]) is a commune in the Seine-et-Marne department in the Île-de-France region in north-central France.

== Demographics ==
Inhabitants of Tigeaux are called Tigéens.

== See also ==
- Communes of the Seine-et-Marne department
