= Canton of Serris =

Canton in Île-de-France, France

Coordinates: 48.84°N 2.79°E

The canton of Serris is an administrative division of the Seine-et-Marne department, in northern France. It was created at the French canton reorganisation which came into effect in March 2015. Its seat is in Serris.

It consists of the following communes:

1. Bailly-Romainvilliers
2. Bouleurs
3. Boutigny
4. Chessy
5. Condé-Sainte-Libiaire
6. Couilly-Pont-aux-Dames
7. Coulommes
8. Coupvray
9. Coutevroult
10. Crécy-la-Chapelle
11. Esbly
12. La Haute-Maison
13. Magny-le-Hongre
14. Montry
15. Quincy-Voisins
16. Saint-Fiacre
17. Saint-Germain-sur-Morin
18. Sancy
19. Serris
20. Tigeaux
21. Vaucourtois
22. Villemareuil
23. Villiers-sur-Morin
24. Voulangis
