= Semécourt =

- Commune
- Coat of arms
- Location of Semécourt
- Location within France Location within Grand Est
- Coordinates: 49°11′38″N 6°08′07″E
- Country: France
- Region: Grand Est
- Department: Moselle
- Arrondissement: Metz
- Canton: Le Sillon Mosellan
- Intercommunality: CC Rives de Moselle

Government
  - Mayor (2020–2026): Martine Martin
- Area^{1}: 2.3 km^{2} (0.89 sq mi)
- Elevation: 267 m (876 ft)
- Highest elevation: 266 m (873 ft)
- Lowest elevation: 167 m (548 ft)
- Population (2023): 1,024
  - Density: 450/km^{2} (1,200/sq mi)
- Time zone: UTC+01:00 (CET)
  - Summer (DST): UTC+02:00 (CEST)
- INSEE/Postal code: 57645 /57280
- ^{1} French Land Register data, which excludes lakes, ponds, glaciers > 1 km^{2} (0.386 sq mi or 247 acres) and river estuaries.

Semécourt (French pronunciation: [səmekuʁ]; German: Sigmarshofen) is a commune in the Moselle department in Grand Est in north-eastern France.

== See also ==
- Communes of the Moselle department
