= La Maxe =

- Commune
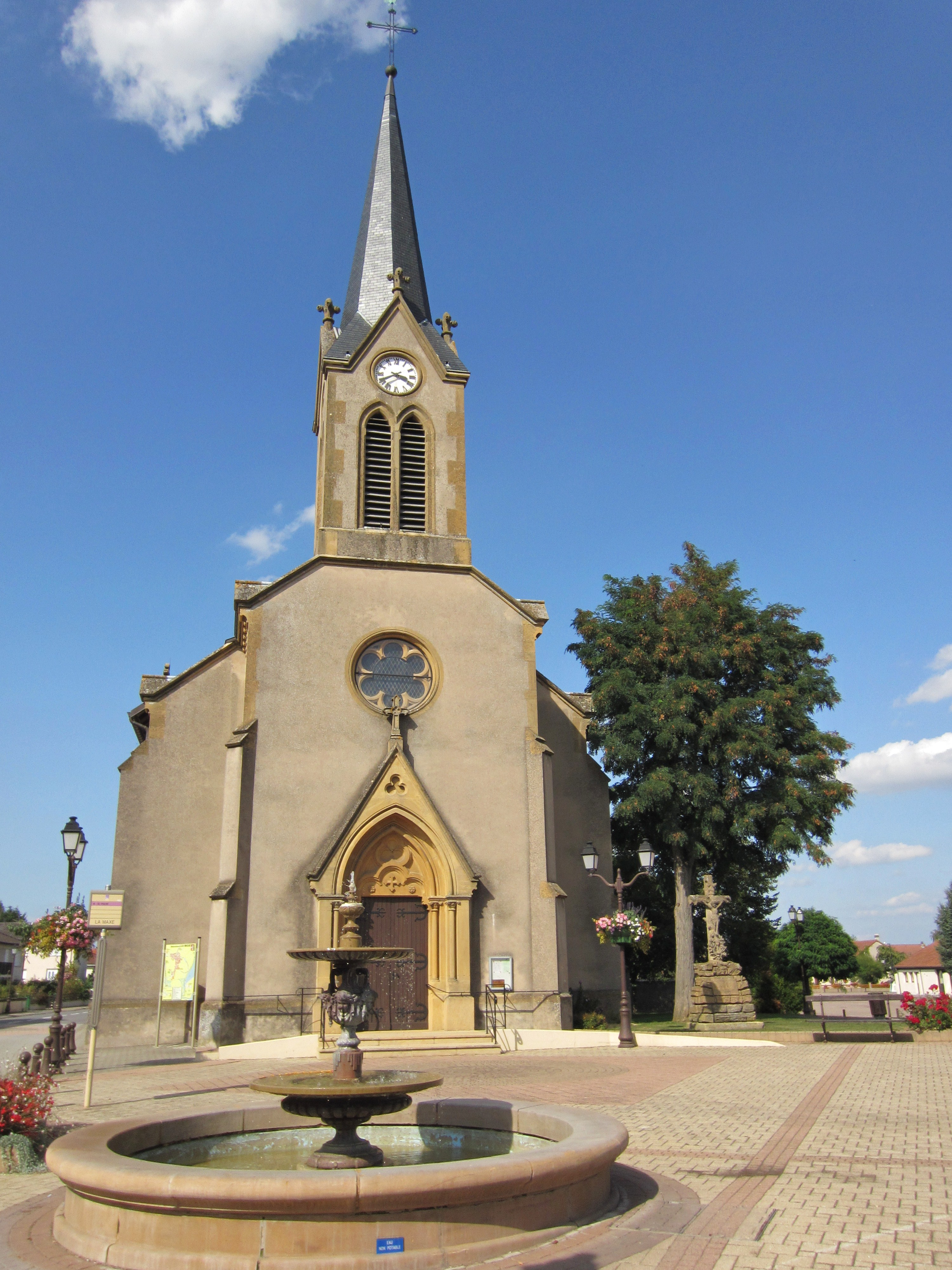
- The church in La Maxe

- Coat of arms
- Location of La Maxe
- Location within France Location within Grand Est
- Coordinates: 49°10′10″N 6°11′23″E
- Country: France
- Region: Grand Est
- Department: Moselle
- Arrondissement: Metz
- Canton: Le Sillon Mosellan
- Intercommunality: Metz Métropole

Government
  - Mayor (2020–2026): Bertrand Duval
- Area^{1}: 7.55 km^{2} (2.92 sq mi)
- Elevation: 162 m (531 ft)
- Highest elevation: 167 m (548 ft)
- Lowest elevation: 161 m (528 ft)
- Population (2023): 1,056
  - Density: 140/km^{2} (362/sq mi)
- Time zone: UTC+01:00 (CET)
  - Summer (DST): UTC+02:00 (CEST)
- INSEE/Postal code: 57452 /57140
- ^{1} French Land Register data, which excludes lakes, ponds, glaciers > 1 km^{2} (0.386 sq mi or 247 acres) and river estuaries.

La Maxe (French pronunciation: [la maks]; German: Masch) is a commune in the Moselle department in Grand Est in north-eastern France.

== See also ==
- Communes of the Moselle department
