= La Haute-Maison =

- Commune
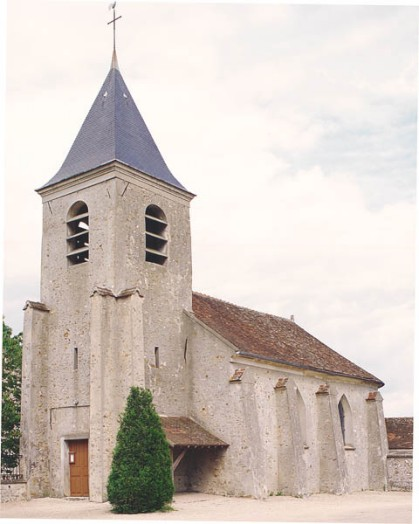
- The church in La Haute-Maison

- Coat of arms
- Location of La Haute-Maison
- Location within France Location within Île-de-France (region)
- Coordinates: 48°52′55″N 3°00′09″E
- Country: France
- Region: Île-de-France
- Department: Seine-et-Marne
- Arrondissement: Meaux
- Canton: Serris
- Intercommunality: CA Coulommiers Pays de Brie

Government
  - Mayor (2020–2026): Albane Ancelin
- Area^{1}: 12.96 km^{2} (5.00 sq mi)
- Highest elevation: 172 m (564 ft)
- Lowest elevation: 141 m (463 ft)
- Population (2023): 352
  - Density: 27.2/km^{2} (70.3/sq mi)
- Time zone: UTC+01:00 (CET)
  - Summer (DST): UTC+02:00 (CEST)
- INSEE/Postal code: 77225 /77580
- ^{1} French Land Register data, which excludes lakes, ponds, glaciers > 1 km^{2} (0.386 sq mi or 247 acres) and river estuaries.

La Haute-Maison (French pronunciation: [la ot mɛzɔ̃]) is a commune in the Seine-et-Marne département in the Île-de-France region in north-central France.

== Demographics ==
Inhabitants are called Altimonciens.

== See also ==
- Communes of the Seine-et-Marne department
