= Coulommes =

- Commune
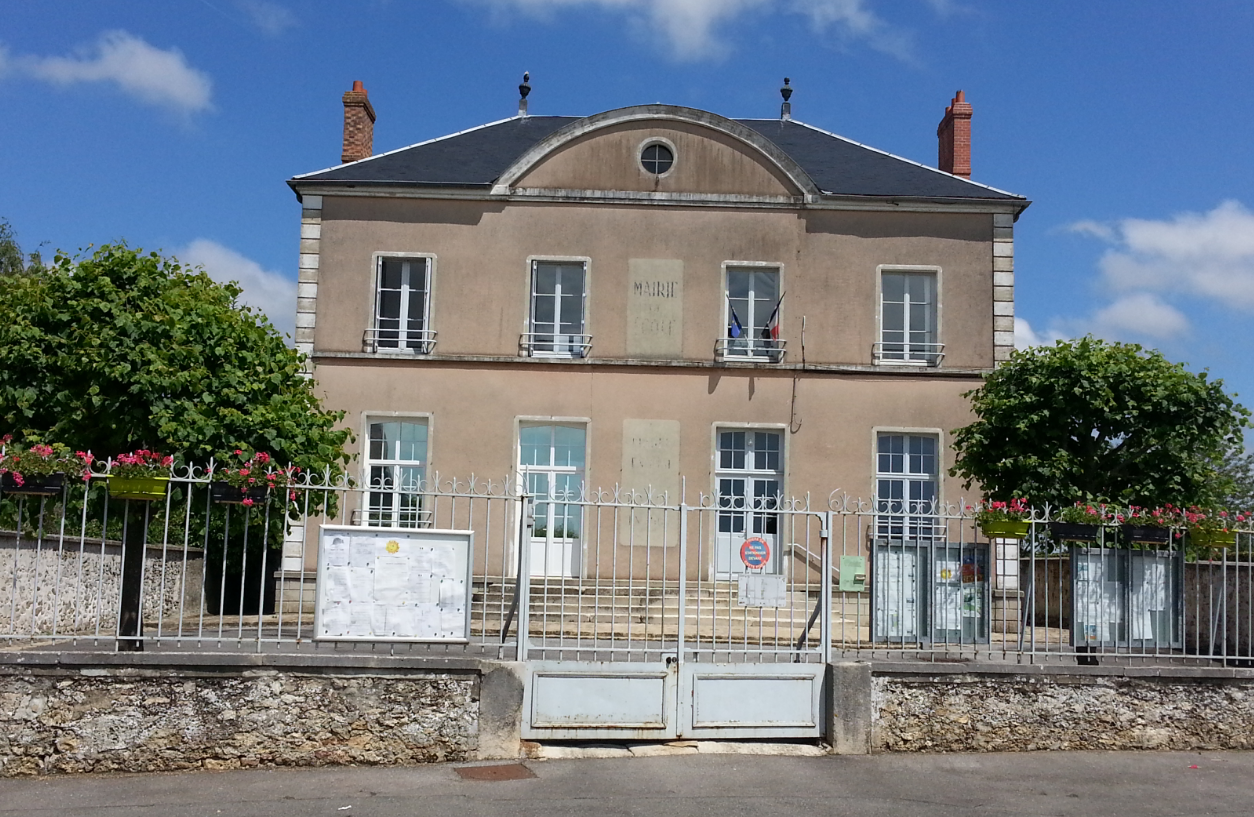
- The town hall in Coulommes
- Location of Coulommes
- Location within France Location within Île-de-France (region)
- Coordinates: 48°53′27″N 2°55′52″E
- Country: France
- Region: Île-de-France
- Department: Seine-et-Marne
- Arrondissement: Meaux
- Canton: Serris
- Intercommunality: CA Coulommiers Pays de Brie

Government
  - Mayor (2020–2026): Françoise Bernard
- Area^{1}: 3.68 km^{2} (1.42 sq mi)
- Highest elevation: 159 m (522 ft)
- Lowest elevation: 88 m (289 ft)
- Population (2023): 542
  - Density: 147/km^{2} (381/sq mi)
- Time zone: UTC+01:00 (CET)
  - Summer (DST): UTC+02:00 (CEST)
- INSEE/Postal code: 77130 /77580
- ^{1} French Land Register data, which excludes lakes, ponds, glaciers > 1 km^{2} (0.386 sq mi or 247 acres) and river estuaries.

Coulommes (French pronunciation: [kulɔm]) is a commune in the Seine-et-Marne department in the Île-de-France region in north-central France.

== See also ==
- Communes of the Seine-et-Marne department
