= Villemareuil =

- Commune
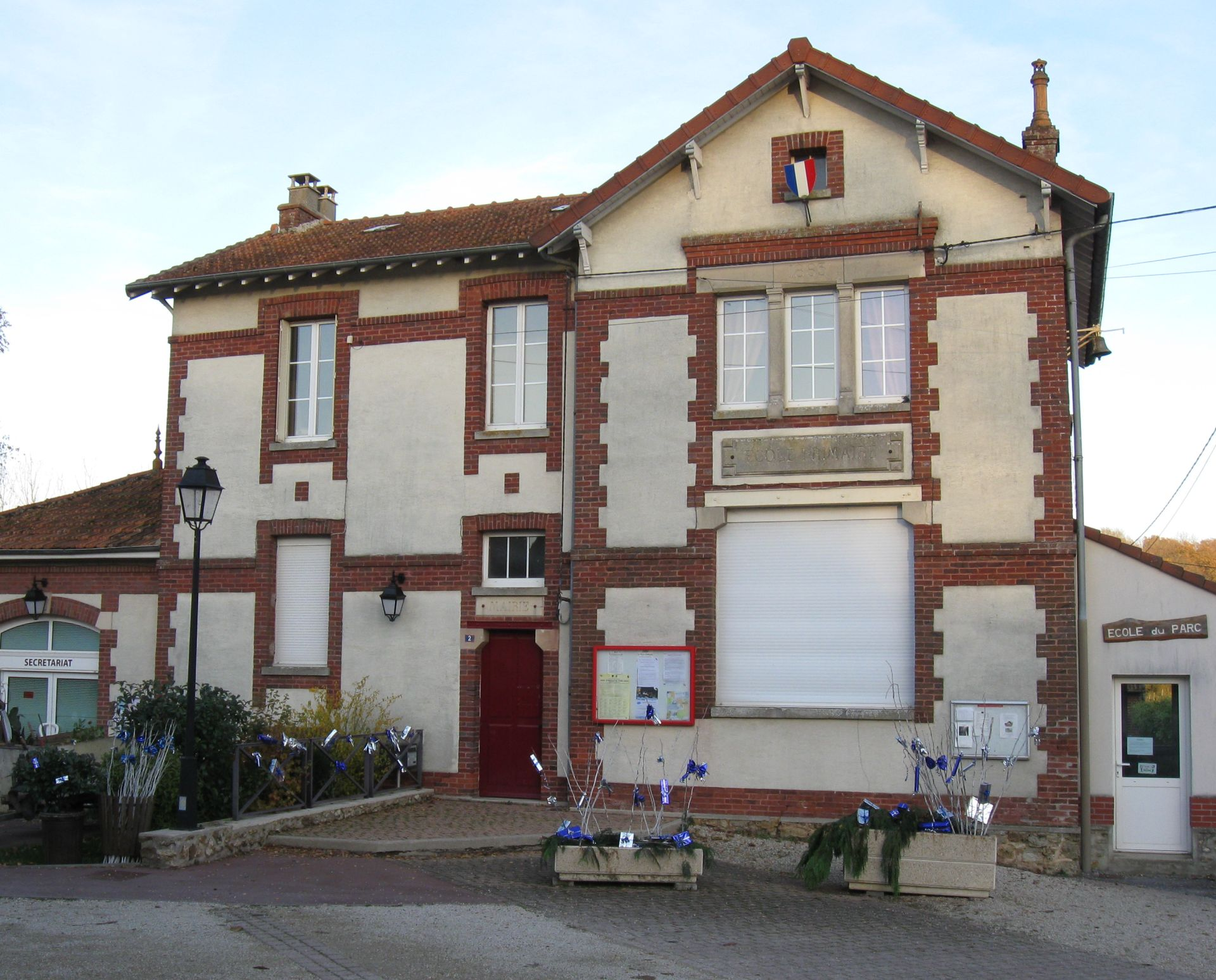
- The town hall in Villemareuil
- Location of Villemareuil
- Location within France Location within Île-de-France (region)
- Coordinates: 48°55′16″N 2°58′24″E
- Country: France
- Region: Île-de-France
- Department: Seine-et-Marne
- Arrondissement: Meaux
- Canton: Serris
- Intercommunality: CA Pays de Meaux

Government
  - Mayor (2020–2026): Didier Tassin
- Area^{1}: 10.67 km^{2} (4.12 sq mi)
- Highest elevation: 173 m (568 ft)
- Lowest elevation: 115 m (377 ft)
- Population (2023): 386
  - Density: 36.2/km^{2} (93.7/sq mi)
- Time zone: UTC+01:00 (CET)
  - Summer (DST): UTC+02:00 (CEST)
- INSEE/Postal code: 77505 /77470
- ^{1} French Land Register data, which excludes lakes, ponds, glaciers > 1 km^{2} (0.386 sq mi or 247 acres) and river estuaries.

Villemareuil (French pronunciation: [vilmaʁœj]) is a commune in the Seine-et-Marne department in the Île-de-France region in north-central France.

== Demographics ==
Inhabitants of Villemareuil are called Villemareuillais.

== See also ==
- Communes of the Seine-et-Marne department
