= Voulangis =

- Commune
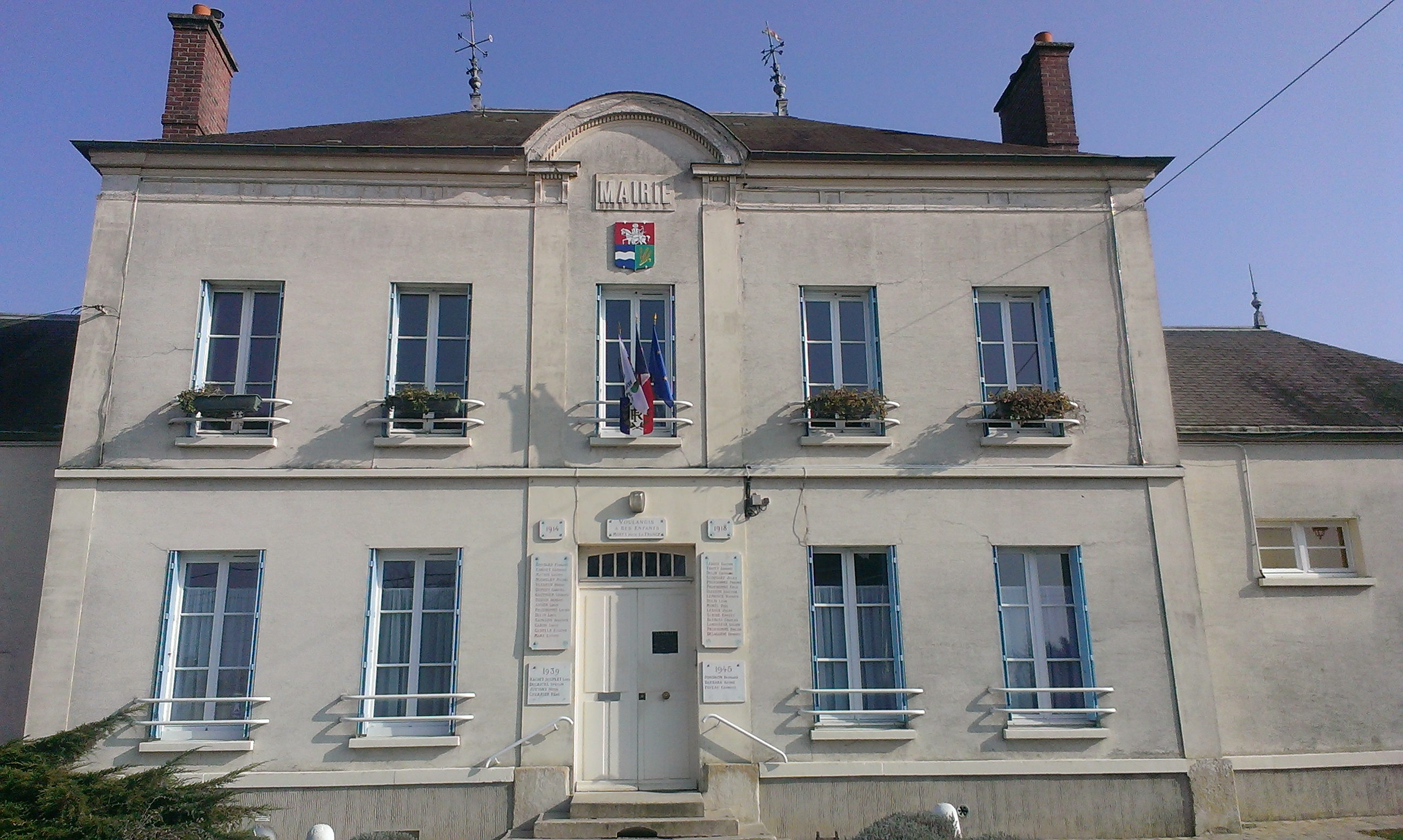
- The town hall in Voulangis

- Coat of arms
- Location of Voulangis
- Location within France Location within Île-de-France (region)
- Coordinates: 48°51′05″N 2°53′57″E
- Country: France
- Region: Île-de-France
- Department: Seine-et-Marne
- Arrondissement: Meaux
- Canton: Serris
- Intercommunality: CA Coulommiers Pays de Brie

Government
  - Mayor (2020–2026): Franz Molet
- Area^{1}: 9.58 km^{2} (3.70 sq mi)
- Highest elevation: 136 m (446 ft)
- Lowest elevation: 45 m (148 ft)
- Population (2023): 1,541
  - Density: 161/km^{2} (417/sq mi)
- Time zone: UTC+01:00 (CET)
  - Summer (DST): UTC+02:00 (CEST)
- INSEE/Postal code: 77529 /77580
- ^{1} French Land Register data, which excludes lakes, ponds, glaciers > 1 km^{2} (0.386 sq mi or 247 acres) and river estuaries.

Voulangis (French pronunciation: [vulɑ̃ʒis]) is a commune in the Seine-et-Marne department in the Île-de-France region in north-central France.

== Demographics ==
Inhabitants of Voulangis are called Voulangeois.

== See also ==
- Communes of the Seine-et-Marne department
