= Boutigny, Seine-et-Marne =

Boutigny
- Commune
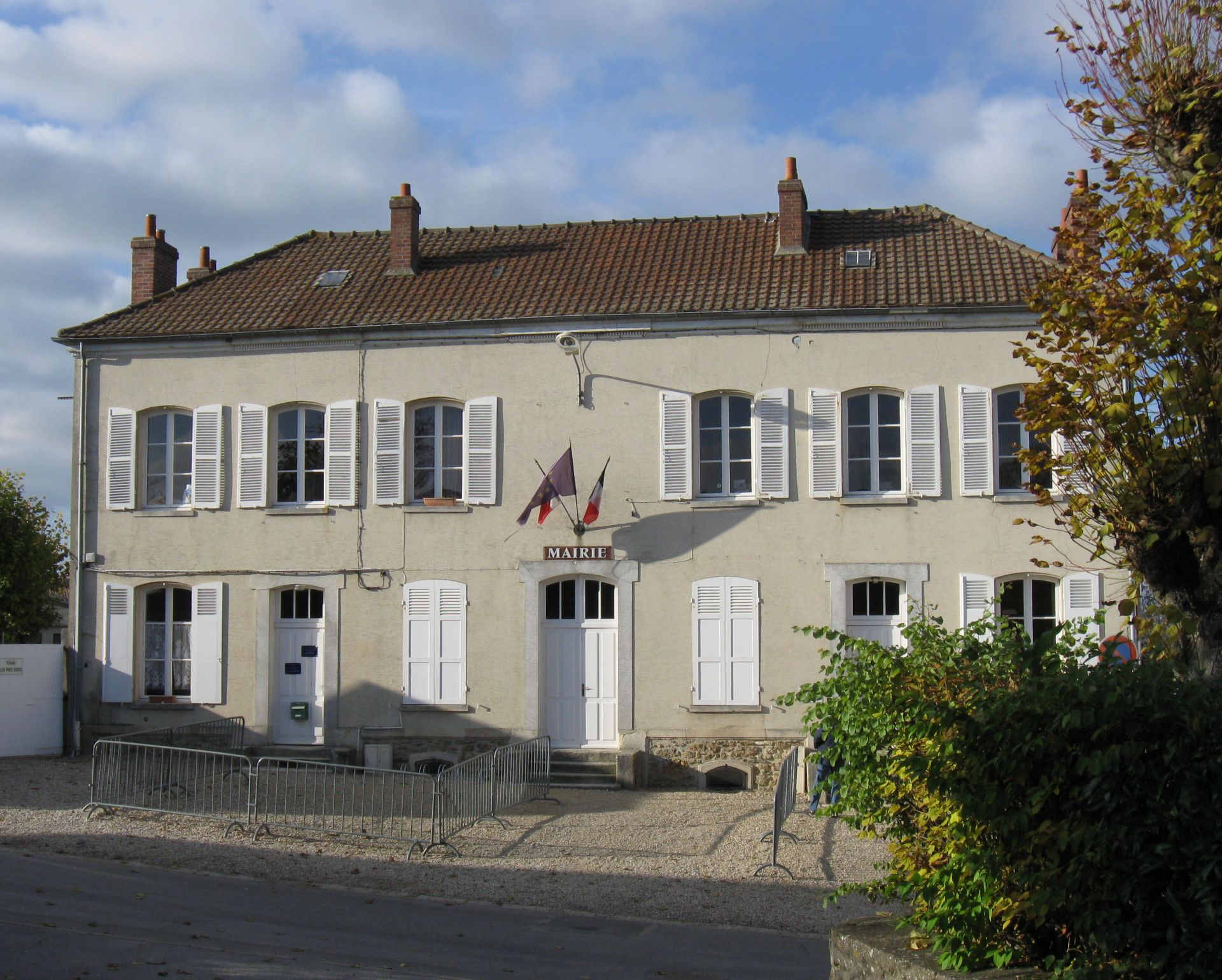
- The town hall in Boutigny
- Location of Boutigny
- Location within France Location within Île-de-France (region)
- Coordinates: 48°55′12″N 2°55′49″E
- Country: France
- Region: Île-de-France
- Department: Seine-et-Marne
- Arrondissement: Meaux
- Canton: Serris
- Intercommunality: CA Pays de Meaux

Government
  - Mayor (2020–2026): Marc Robin
- Area^{1}: 9.88 km^{2} (3.81 sq mi)
- Highest elevation: 171 m (561 ft)
- Lowest elevation: 60 m (200 ft)
- Population (2023): 874
  - Density: 88.5/km^{2} (229/sq mi)
- Time zone: UTC+01:00 (CET)
  - Summer (DST): UTC+02:00 (CEST)
- INSEE/Postal code: 77049 /77470
- ^{1} French Land Register data, which excludes lakes, ponds, glaciers > 1 km^{2} (0.386 sq mi or 247 acres) and river estuaries.

Boutigny (French pronunciation: [butiɲi]) is a commune in the Seine-et-Marne department in the Île-de-France region in north-central France.

== Demographics ==
The inhabitants are called Boutignaciens.

== See also ==
- Communes of the Seine-et-Marne department
