= Villiers-sur-Morin =

- Commune
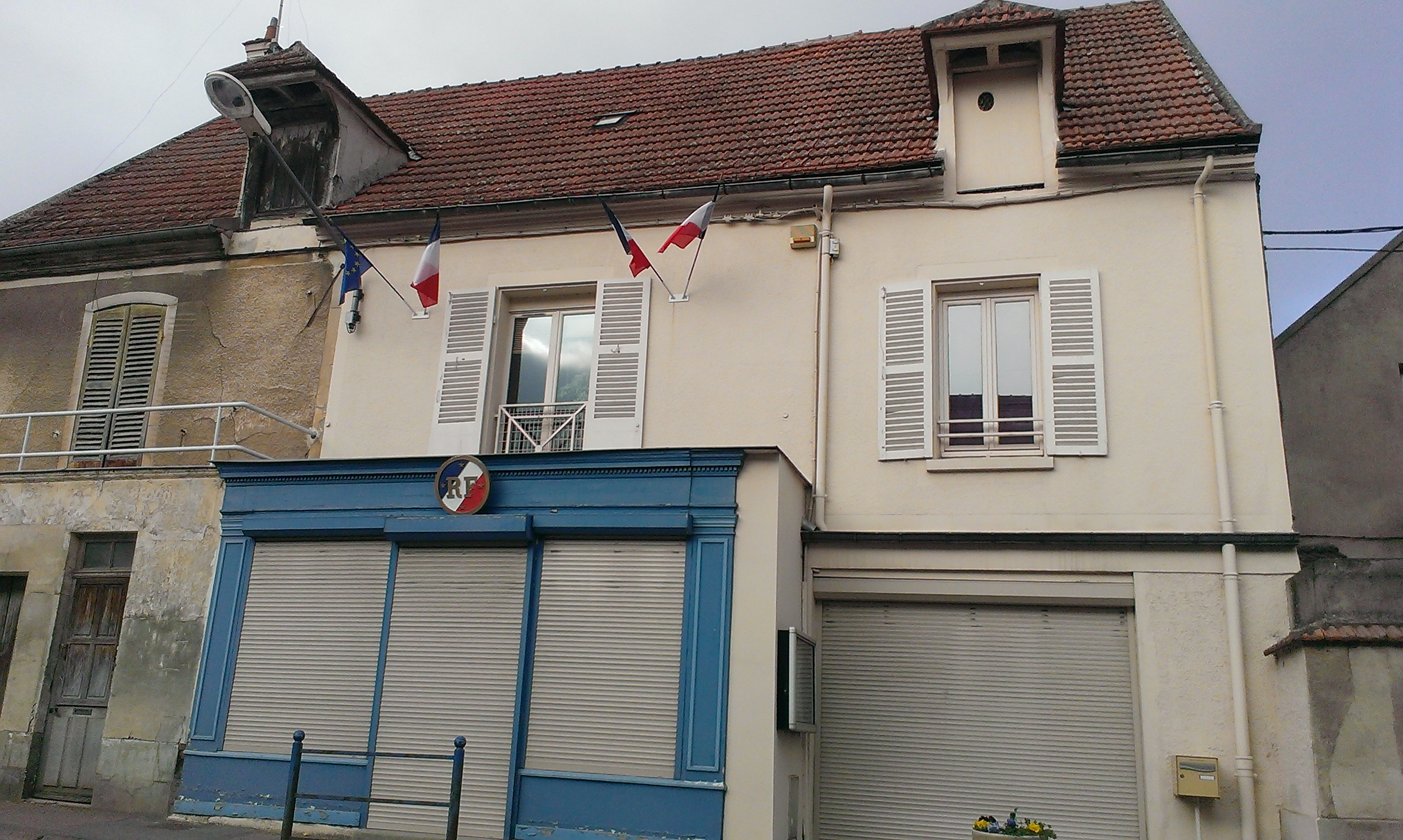
- The town hall in Villiers-sur-Morin

- Coat of arms
- Location of Villiers-sur-Morin
- Location within France Location within Île-de-France (region)
- Coordinates: 48°51′40″N 2°52′54″E
- Country: France
- Region: Île-de-France
- Department: Seine-et-Marne
- Arrondissement: Meaux
- Canton: Serris
- Intercommunality: CA Coulommiers Pays de Brie

Government
  - Mayor (2023–2026): Caroline Auliac
- Area^{1}: 6.28 km^{2} (2.42 sq mi)
- Highest elevation: 134 m (440 ft)
- Lowest elevation: 44 m (144 ft)
- Population (2023): 2,083
  - Density: 332/km^{2} (859/sq mi)
- Time zone: UTC+01:00 (CET)
  - Summer (DST): UTC+02:00 (CEST)
- INSEE/Postal code: 77521 /77580
- ^{1} French Land Register data, which excludes lakes, ponds, glaciers > 1 km^{2} (0.386 sq mi or 247 acres) and river estuaries.

Villiers-sur-Morin (French pronunciation: [vilje syʁ mɔʁɛ̃], literally Villiers on Morin) is a commune in the Seine-et-Marne department in the Île-de-France region in north-central France.

== Demographics ==
Inhabitants of Villiers-sur-Morin are called Villermorinois in French.

Historical population
| Year | Pop. | ±% p.a. |
|---|---|---|
| 1968 | 597 | — |
| 1975 | 830 | +4.82% |
| 1982 | 1,054 | +3.47% |
| 1990 | 1,358 | +3.22% |
| 1999 | 1,527 | +1.31% |
| 2007 | 1,684 | +1.23% |
| 2012 | 1,911 | +2.56% |
| 2017 | 1,926 | +0.16% |
| 2023 | 2,083 | +1.31% |
Source: INSEE

== See also ==
- Communes of the Seine-et-Marne department
