= Sancy, Seine-et-Marne =

Sancy
- Commune
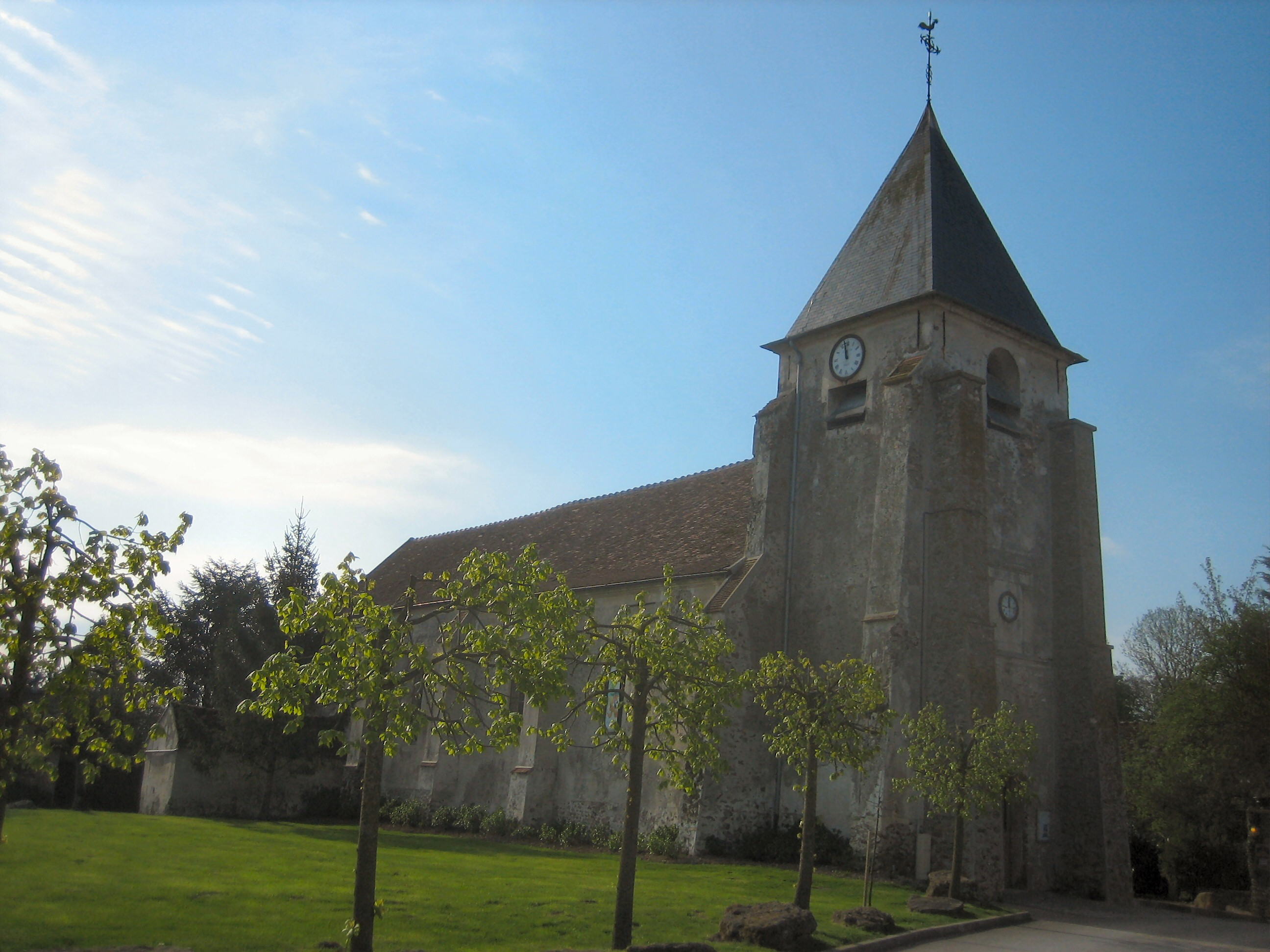
- The church in Sancy
- Location of Sancy
- Location within France Location within Île-de-France (region)
- Coordinates: 48°53′08″N 2°57′30″E
- Country: France
- Region: Île-de-France
- Department: Seine-et-Marne
- Arrondissement: Meaux
- Canton: Serris
- Intercommunality: CA Coulommiers Pays de Brie

Government
  - Mayor (2020–2026): Vincent Duport
- Area^{1}: 5.48 km^{2} (2.12 sq mi)
- Highest elevation: 164 m (538 ft)
- Lowest elevation: 118 m (387 ft)
- Population (2023): 401
  - Density: 73.2/km^{2} (190/sq mi)
- Time zone: UTC+01:00 (CET)
  - Summer (DST): UTC+02:00 (CEST)
- INSEE/Postal code: 77443 /77580
- ^{1} French Land Register data, which excludes lakes, ponds, glaciers > 1 km^{2} (0.386 sq mi or 247 acres) and river estuaries.

Sancy (French pronunciation: [sɑ̃si]) or Sancy-lès-Meaux (French pronunciation: [sɑ̃si lɛ mo], literally Sancy near Meaux) is a commune in the Seine-et-Marne department in the Île-de-France region in north-central France.

== Demographics ==
Inhabitants of Sancy-lès-Meaux are called Sancéens.

== See also ==
- Communes of the Seine-et-Marne department
