= Couilly-Pont-aux-Dames =

- Commune
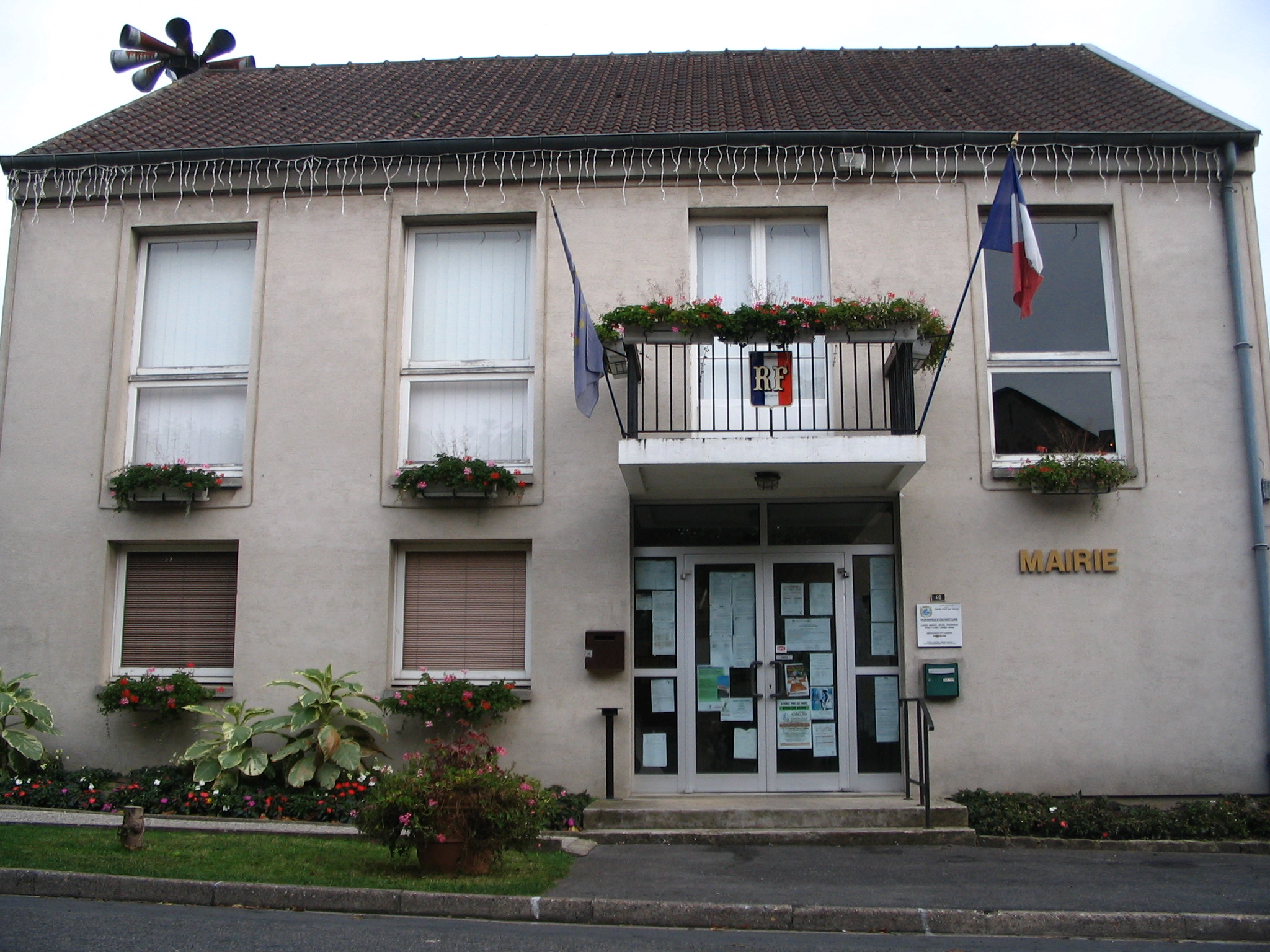
- The town hall in Couilly-Pont-aux-Dames

- Coat of arms
- Location of Couilly-Pont-aux-Dames
- Location within France Location within Île-de-France (region)
- Coordinates: 48°53′08″N 2°51′35″E
- Country: France
- Region: Île-de-France
- Department: Seine-et-Marne
- Arrondissement: Meaux
- Canton: Serris
- Intercommunality: CA Coulommiers Pays de Brie

Government
  - Mayor (2020–2026): Jean-Louis Vaudescal
- Area^{1}: 4.75 km^{2} (1.83 sq mi)
- Highest elevation: 119 m (390 ft)
- Lowest elevation: 45 m (148 ft)
- Population (2023): 2,064
  - Density: 435/km^{2} (1,130/sq mi)
- Time zone: UTC+01:00 (CET)
  - Summer (DST): UTC+02:00 (CEST)
- INSEE/Postal code: 77128 /77860
- ^{1} French Land Register data, which excludes lakes, ponds, glaciers > 1 km^{2} (0.386 sq mi or 247 acres) and river estuaries.

Couilly-Pont-aux-Dames (French pronunciation: [kuji pɔ̃.t‿o dam]) is a commune in the Seine-et-Marne department in the Île-de-France region in north-central France.

== Population ==
Historical population
Year	Pop.	±% p.a.
1968	850	—
1975	1,037	+2.88%
1982	1,273	+2.97%
1990	1,635	+3.18%
1999	1,897	+1.67%
2007	2,042	+0.92%
2012	2,169	+1.21%
2017	2,154	−0.14%
2023	2,064	−0.71%
Source: INSEE

The inhabitants are called Colliaciens in French.

== See also ==
- Communes of the Seine-et-Marne department
