= Saint-Germain-sur-Morin =

- Commune
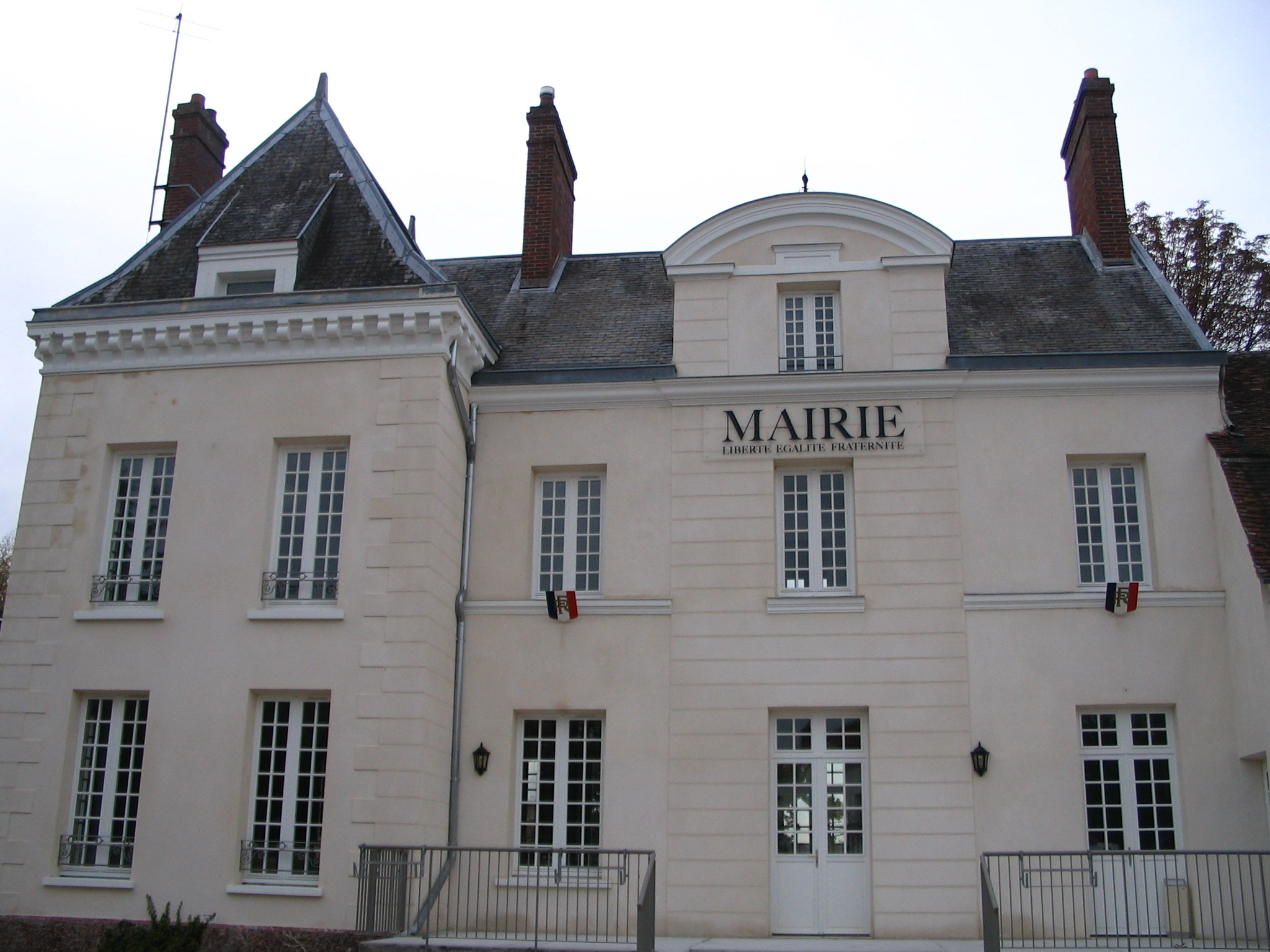
- The town hall in Saint-Germain-sur-Morin

- Coat of arms
- Location of Saint-Germain-sur-Morin
- Location within France Location within Île-de-France (region)
- Coordinates: 48°52′56″N 2°51′03″E
- Country: France
- Region: Île-de-France
- Department: Seine-et-Marne
- Arrondissement: Torcy
- Canton: Serris
- Intercommunality: Val d'Europe Agglomération

Government
  - Mayor (2020–2026): Gérard Gourovitch
- Area^{1}: 4.81 km^{2} (1.86 sq mi)
- Highest elevation: 141 m (463 ft)
- Lowest elevation: 45 m (148 ft)
- Population (2023): 3,902
  - Density: 811/km^{2} (2,100/sq mi)
- Demonym: Saint-Germinois
- Time zone: UTC+01:00 (CET)
  - Summer (DST): UTC+02:00 (CEST)
- INSEE/Postal code: 77413 /77860
- Website: www.saint-germain-sur-morin.org
- ^{1} French Land Register data, which excludes lakes, ponds, glaciers > 1 km^{2} (0.386 sq mi or 247 acres) and river estuaries.

Saint-Germain-sur-Morin (French pronunciation: [sɛ̃ ʒɛʁmɛ̃ syʁ mɔʁɛ̃]; lit. 'St Germain-on-Morin') is a commune in the Seine-et-Marne department in the Île-de-France region in north-central France.

== Population ==
Historical population
Year	Pop.	±% p.a.
1968	676	—
1975	2,067	+17.31%
1982	2,124	+0.39%
1990	2,356	+1.30%
1999	2,755	+1.75%
2007	3,362	+2.52%
2012	3,541	+1.04%
2017	3,664	+0.69%
2023	3,902	+1.05%
Source: INSEE

Inhabitants of Saint-Germain-sur-Morin are called Saint-Germinois in French.

== See also ==
- Communes of the Seine-et-Marne department
