= Condé-Sainte-Libiaire =

- Commune
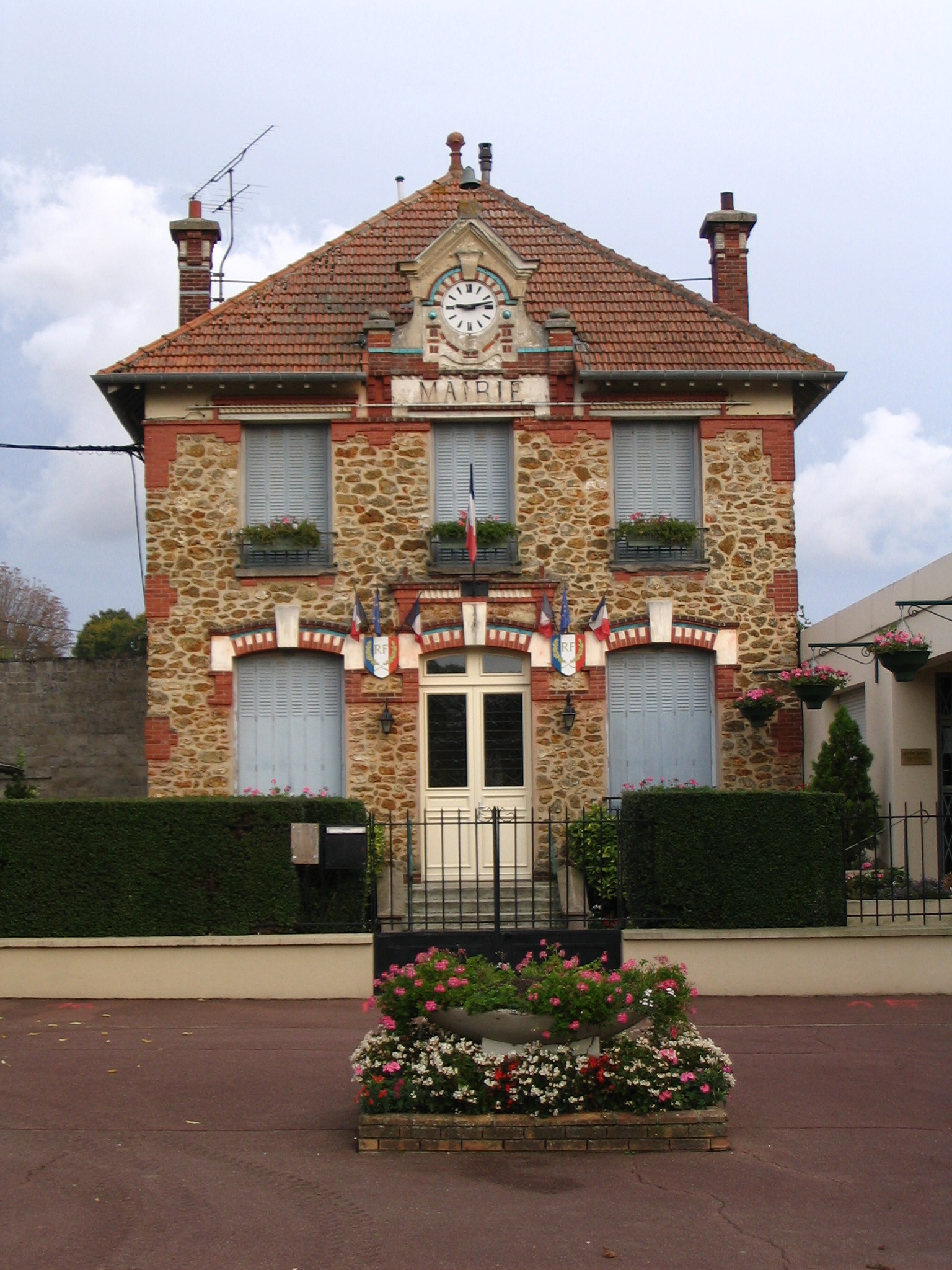
- The town hall in Condé-Sainte-Libiaire

- Coat of arms
- Location of Condé-Sainte-Libiaire
- Location within France Location within Île-de-France (region)
- Coordinates: 48°53′55″N 2°49′56″E
- Country: France
- Region: Île-de-France
- Department: Seine-et-Marne
- Arrondissement: Meaux
- Canton: Serris
- Intercommunality: CA Coulommiers Pays de Brie

Government
  - Mayor (2020–2026): Fabrice Marcilly
- Area^{1}: 2.15 km^{2} (0.83 sq mi)
- Highest elevation: 91 m (299 ft)
- Lowest elevation: 41 m (135 ft)
- Population (2023): 1,500
  - Density: 700/km^{2} (1,800/sq mi)
- Time zone: UTC+01:00 (CET)
  - Summer (DST): UTC+02:00 (CEST)
- INSEE/Postal code: 77125 /77450
- ^{1} French Land Register data, which excludes lakes, ponds, glaciers > 1 km^{2} (0.386 sq mi or 247 acres) and river estuaries.

Condé-Sainte-Libiaire (French pronunciation: [kɔ̃de sɛ̃t libjɛʁ]) is a commune in the Seine-et-Marne department in the Île-de-France region in north-central France.

== Demographics ==
The inhabitants are called Condéens.

== See also ==
- Communes of the Seine-et-Marne department
