= Bouleurs =

- Commune
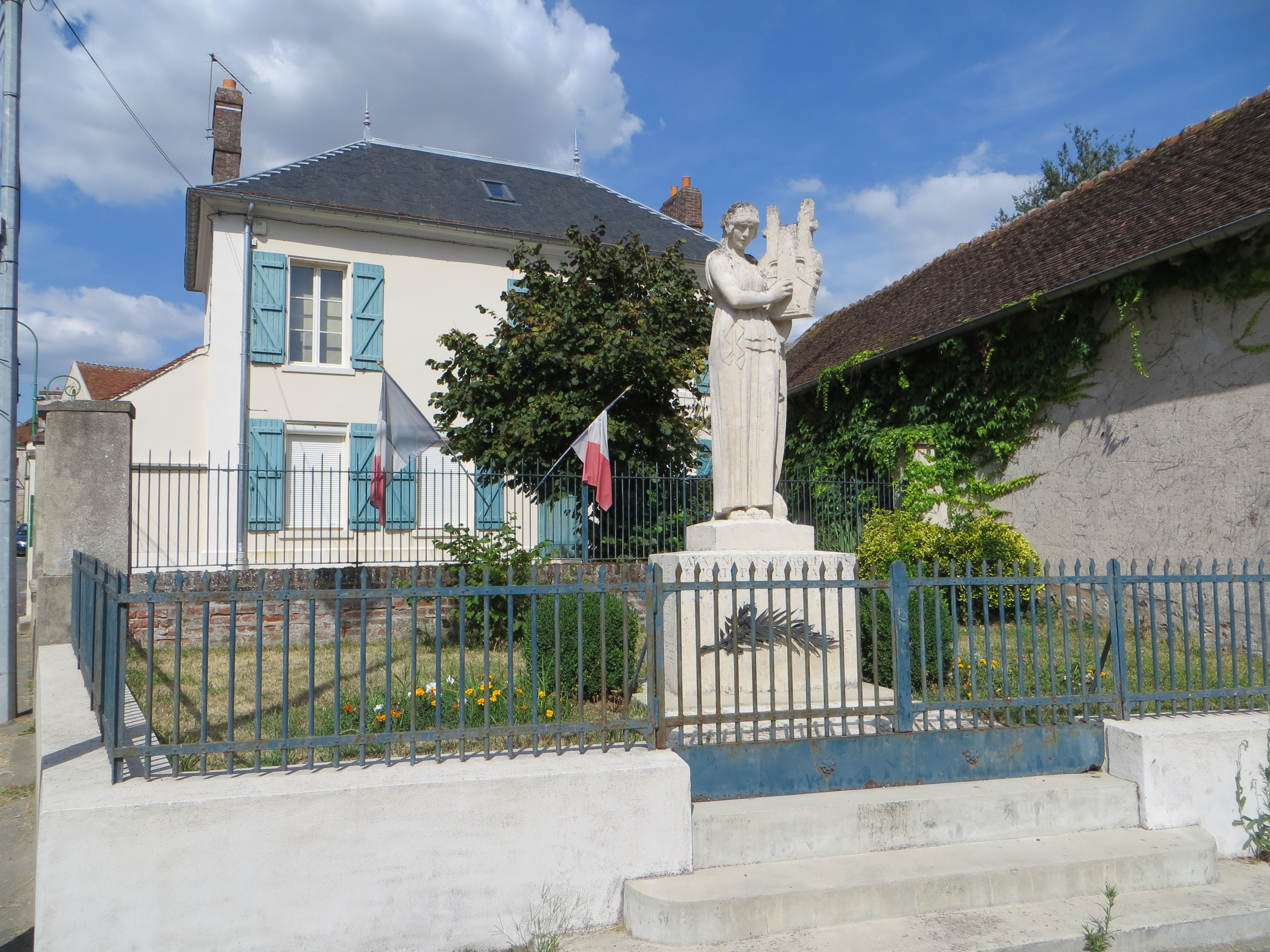
- The town hall and war memorial in Bouleurs

- Coat of arms
- Location of Bouleurs
- Location within France Location within Île-de-France (region)
- Coordinates: 48°52′58″N 2°54′28″E
- Country: France
- Region: Île-de-France
- Department: Seine-et-Marne
- Arrondissement: Meaux
- Canton: Serris
- Intercommunality: CA Coulommiers Pays de Brie

Government
  - Mayor (2020–2026): Monique Bourdier
- Area^{1}: 8.25 km^{2} (3.19 sq mi)
- Highest elevation: 156 m (512 ft)
- Lowest elevation: 65 m (213 ft)
- Population (2023): 1,743
  - Density: 211/km^{2} (547/sq mi)
- Time zone: UTC+01:00 (CET)
  - Summer (DST): UTC+02:00 (CEST)
- INSEE/Postal code: 77047 /77580
- ^{1} French Land Register data, which excludes lakes, ponds, glaciers > 1 km^{2} (0.386 sq mi or 247 acres) and river estuaries.

Bouleurs (French pronunciation: [bulœʁ]) is a commune in the Seine-et-Marne department in the Île-de-France region in north-central France.

== Demographics ==
The inhabitants are called Bouleurois.

== See also ==
- Communes of the Seine-et-Marne department
