= Coutevroult =

- Commune
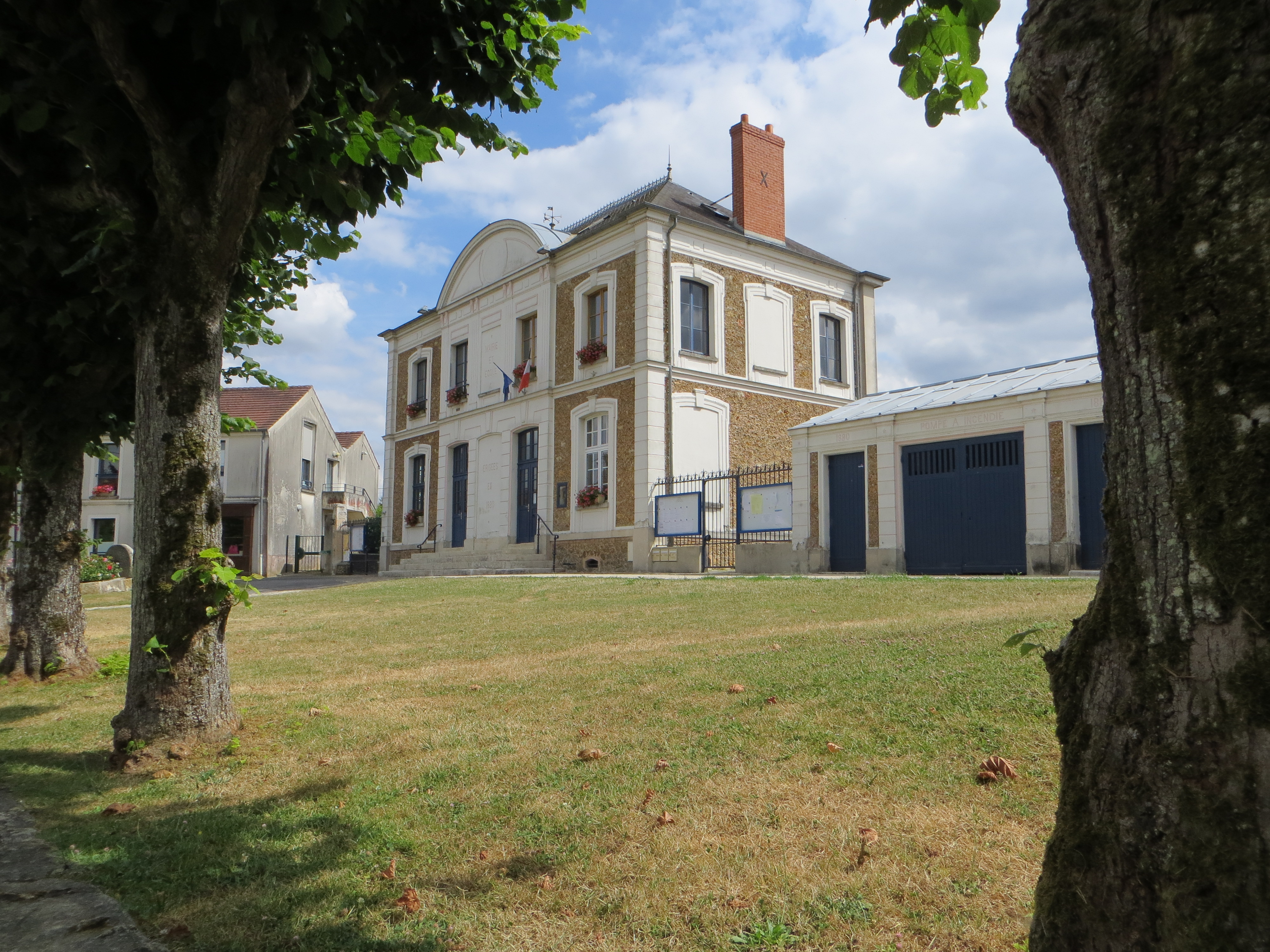
- The town hall in Coutevroult
- Location of Coutevroult
- Location within France Location within Île-de-France (region)
- Coordinates: 48°51′47″N 2°51′08″E
- Country: France
- Region: Île-de-France
- Department: Seine-et-Marne
- Arrondissement: Meaux
- Canton: Serris
- Intercommunality: CA Coulommiers Pays de Brie

Government
  - Mayor (2020–2026): Jean-Jacques Prévost
- Area^{1}: 7.79 km^{2} (3.01 sq mi)
- Highest elevation: 142 m (466 ft)
- Lowest elevation: 47 m (154 ft)
- Population (2023): 1,187
  - Density: 152/km^{2} (395/sq mi)
- Time zone: UTC+01:00 (CET)
  - Summer (DST): UTC+02:00 (CEST)
- INSEE/Postal code: 77141 /77580
- ^{1} French Land Register data, which excludes lakes, ponds, glaciers > 1 km^{2} (0.386 sq mi or 247 acres) and river estuaries.

Coutevroult (French pronunciation: [kutəvʁu]) is a commune in the Seine-et-Marne department in the Île-de-France region ini north-central France.

== Demographics ==
The inhabitants are called Coutevroultois. As of 2023, the population of the commune was 1,187.

== See also ==
- Communes of the Seine-et-Marne department
