= Vaucourtois =

- Commune
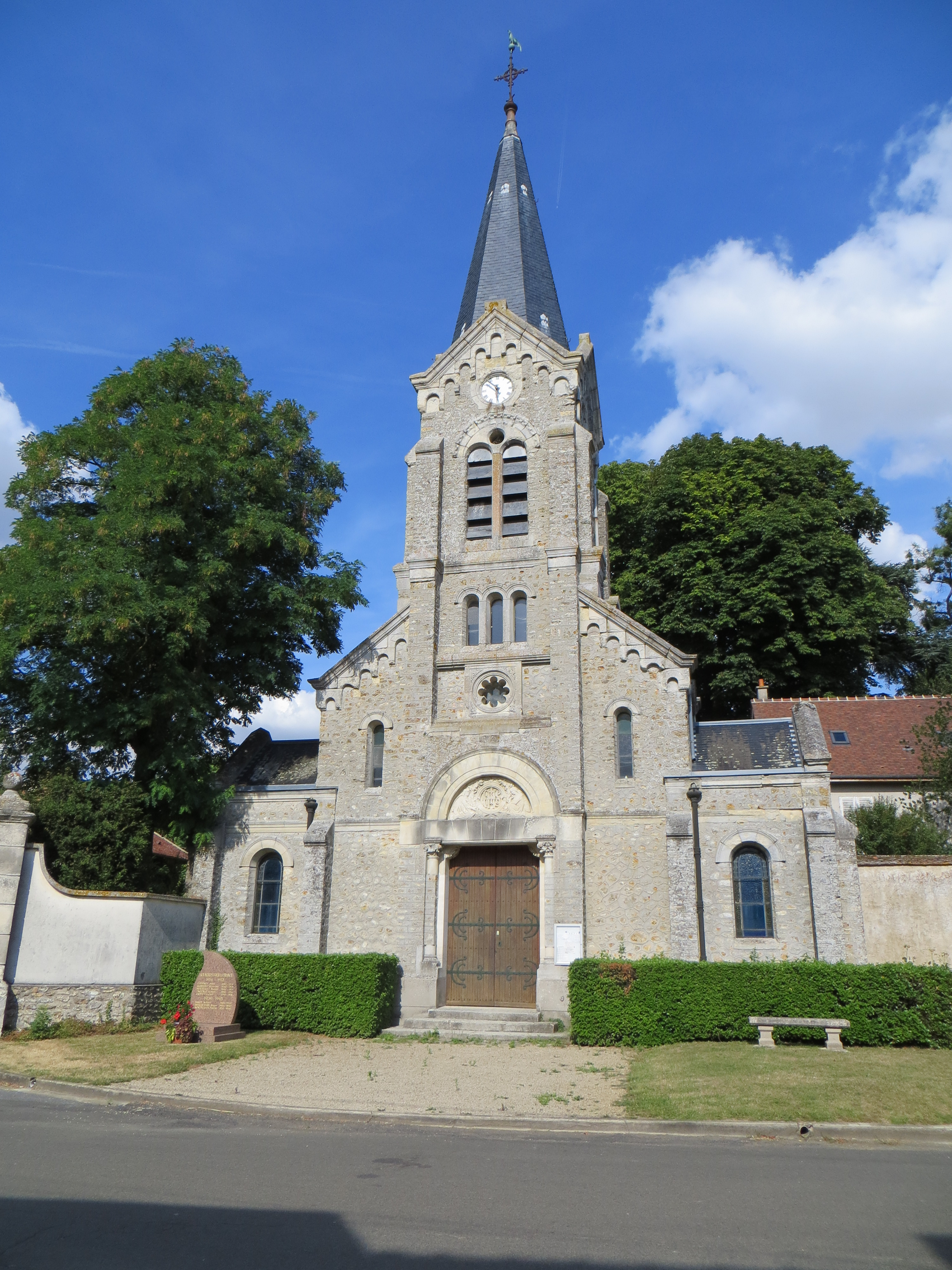
- The church in Vaucourtois
- Location of Vaucourtois
- Location within France Location within Île-de-France (region)
- Coordinates: 48°53′47″N 2°57′11″E
- Country: France
- Region: Île-de-France
- Department: Seine-et-Marne
- Arrondissement: Meaux
- Canton: Serris
- Intercommunality: CA Coulommiers Pays de Brie

Government
  - Mayor (2020–2026): Maryse Michon
- Area^{1}: 4.68 km^{2} (1.81 sq mi)
- Highest elevation: 169 m (554 ft)
- Lowest elevation: 122 m (400 ft)
- Population (2023): 277
  - Density: 59.2/km^{2} (153/sq mi)
- Time zone: UTC+01:00 (CET)
  - Summer (DST): UTC+02:00 (CEST)
- INSEE/Postal code: 77484 /77580
- ^{1} French Land Register data, which excludes lakes, ponds, glaciers > 1 km^{2} (0.386 sq mi or 247 acres) and river estuaries.

Vaucourtois (French pronunciation: [vokuʁtwa]) is a commune of the Seine-et-Marne department in the administrative region of Île-de-France, France.

== Demographics ==
Inhabitants of Vaucourtois are called Vaucourtoisiens (feminine: Vaucourtoisiennes).

== See also ==
- Communes of Seine-et-Marne
