= Montry =

- Commune
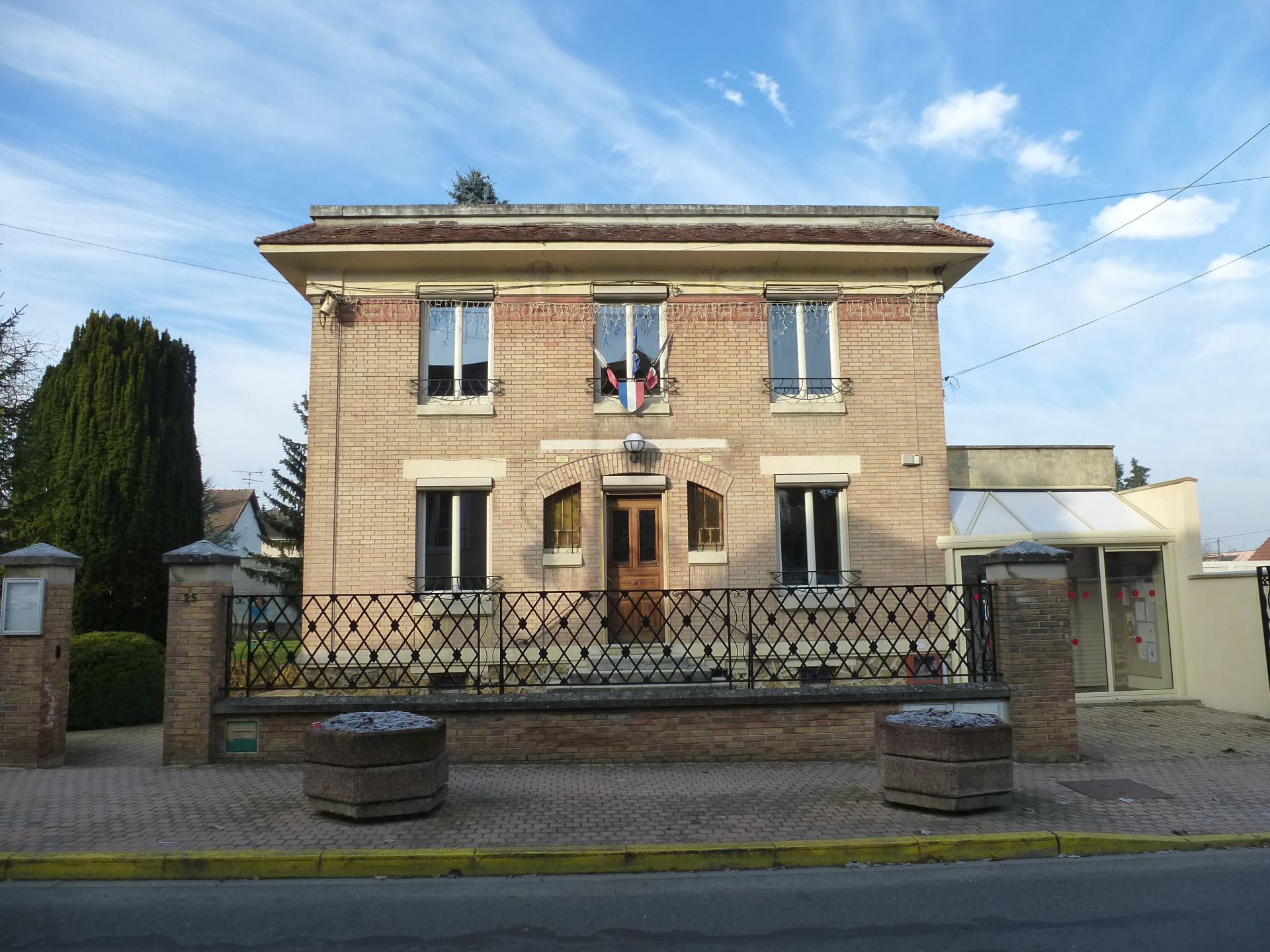
- The town hall in Montry

- Coat of arms
- Location of Montry
- Location within France Location within Île-de-France (region)
- Coordinates: 48°53′18″N 2°49′38″E
- Country: France
- Region: Île-de-France
- Department: Seine-et-Marne
- Arrondissement: Torcy
- Canton: Serris
- Intercommunality: Val d'Europe Agglomération

Government
  - Mayor (2020–2026): Françoise Schmit
- Area^{1}: 2.86 km^{2} (1.10 sq mi)
- Highest elevation: 128 m (420 ft)
- Lowest elevation: 43 m (141 ft)
- Population (2023): 3,945
  - Density: 1,380/km^{2} (3,570/sq mi)
- Time zone: UTC+01:00 (CET)
  - Summer (DST): UTC+02:00 (CEST)
- INSEE/Postal code: 77315 /77450
- ^{1} French Land Register data, which excludes lakes, ponds, glaciers > 1 km^{2} (0.386 sq mi or 247 acres) and river estuaries.

Montry (French pronunciation: [mɔ̃tʁi]) is a commune in the Seine-et-Marne department in the Île-de-France region in north-central France.

== Population ==
Historical population
Year	Pop.	±% p.a.
1968	1,224	—
1975	2,288	+9.35%
1982	2,625	+1.98%
1990	2,781	+0.72%
1999	3,066	+1.09%
2007	3,237	+0.68%
2012	3,398	+0.98%
2017	3,631	+1.34%
2023	3,945	+1.39%
Source: INSEE

Inhabitants are called Montéricultois in French.

== See also ==
- Communes of the Seine-et-Marne department
