= Quincy-Voisins =

- Commune
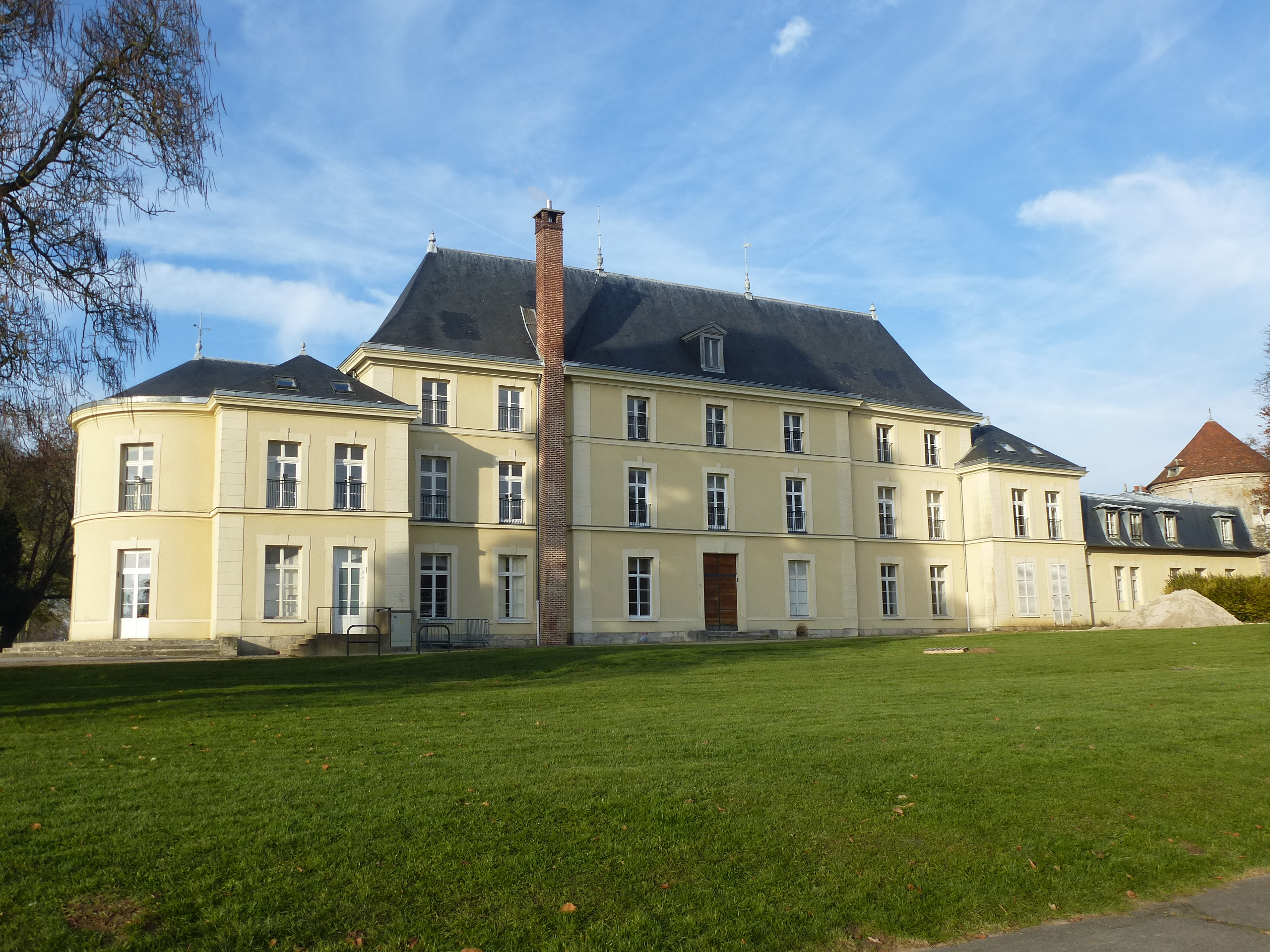
- The chateau in Quincy-Voisins
- Location of Quincy-Voisins
- Location within France Location within Île-de-France (region)
- Coordinates: 48°53′54″N 2°53′00″E
- Country: France
- Region: Île-de-France
- Department: Seine-et-Marne
- Arrondissement: Meaux
- Canton: Serris
- Intercommunality: CA Pays de Meaux

Government
  - Mayor (2023–2026): Denis Lemaire
- Area^{1}: 10.33 km^{2} (3.99 sq mi)
- Highest elevation: 138 m (453 ft)
- Lowest elevation: 43 m (141 ft)
- Population (2023): 5,547
  - Density: 537.0/km^{2} (1,391/sq mi)
- Time zone: UTC+01:00 (CET)
  - Summer (DST): UTC+02:00 (CEST)
- INSEE/Postal code: 77382 /77860
- ^{1} French Land Register data, which excludes lakes, ponds, glaciers > 1 km^{2} (0.386 sq mi or 247 acres) and river estuaries.

Quincy-Voisins (French pronunciation: [kɛ̃si vwazɛ̃]) is a commune in the Seine-et-Marne governmental department in the Île-de-France region of north-central France.

== Demographics ==
The inhabitants of the commune are called Quincéens in French.

Historical population
Year	Pop.	±% p.a.
1968	1,462	—
1975	2,304	+6.71%
1982	3,167	+4.65%
1990	3,969	+2.86%
1999	4,561	+1.56%
2007	4,944	+1.01%
2012	5,078	+0.54%
2017	5,435	+1.37%
2023	5,547	+0.34%
Source: INSEE

== Twin towns ==
The town is twinned with the village of Braunston in Northamptonshire, England.

== See also ==
- Communes of the Seine-et-Marne department
