= Esbly =

- Commune
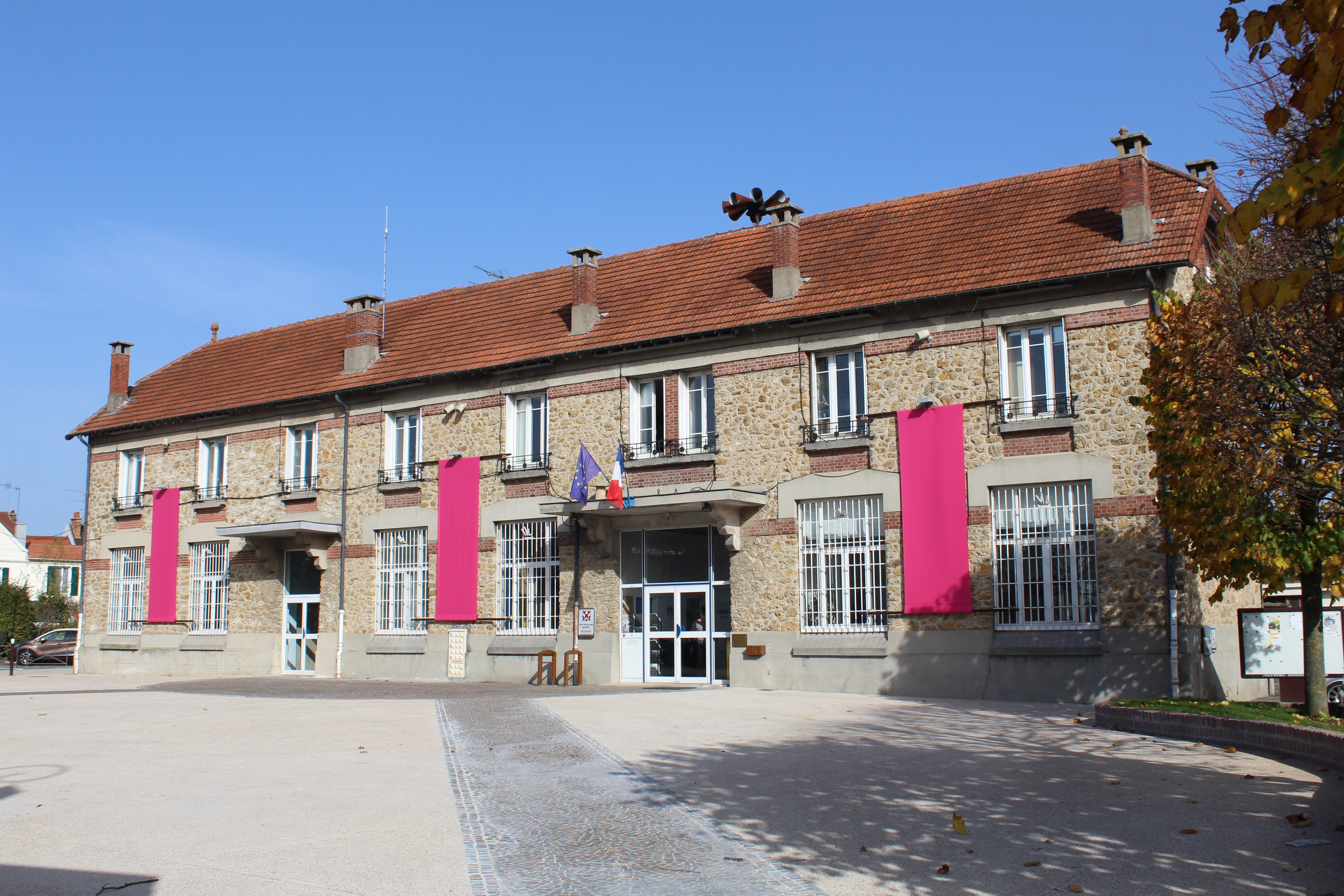
- The town hall in Esbly

- Coat of arms
- Location of Esbly
- Location within France Location within Île-de-France (region)
- Coordinates: 48°54′24″N 2°48′45″E
- Country: France
- Region: Île-de-France
- Department: Seine-et-Marne
- Arrondissement: Torcy
- Canton: Serris
- Intercommunality: Val d'Europe Agglomération

Government
  - Mayor (2020–2026): Ghislain Delvaux
- Area^{1}: 3.12 km^{2} (1.20 sq mi)
- Highest elevation: 111 m (364 ft)
- Lowest elevation: 42 m (138 ft)
- Population (2023): 6,072
  - Density: 1,950/km^{2} (5,040/sq mi)
- Time zone: UTC+01:00 (CET)
  - Summer (DST): UTC+02:00 (CEST)
- INSEE/Postal code: 77171 /77450
- ^{1} French Land Register data, which excludes lakes, ponds, glaciers > 1 km^{2} (0.386 sq mi or 247 acres) and river estuaries.

Esbly (French: [ɛzbli]) is a commune in the Seine-et-Marne department in the Île-de-France region in north-central France.

== Demographics ==
Inhabitants of Esbly are called Esblygeois in French.

Historical population
Year	Pop.	±% p.a.
1968	2,433	—
1975	4,035	+7.49%
1982	4,218	+0.64%
1990	4,488	+0.78%
1999	5,131	+1.50%
2007	5,552	+0.99%
2012	6,004	+1.58%
2017	6,220	+0.71%
2023	6,072	−0.40%
Source: INSEE

== Education ==
There are four primary schools in Esbly: École maternelle Les Couleurs (preschool), École maternelle des Champs-Forts (preschool), École élémentaire du Centre (elementary school), and École élémentaire des Champs-Forts (elementary school). There is one junior high school, Collège Louis Braille.

== See also ==
- Communes of the Seine-et-Marne department
