= A104 autoroute =

Road in France

A104 autoroute

Route information
- Maintained by DIR Île-de-France
- Length: 30 km (19 mi)
- Existed: 1980–present

Major junctions
- North end: N 104 E15 / E19 / A 1 in Épiais-lès-Louvres

- South end: E50 / A 4 in Collégien

Location
- Country: France

Highway system
- Roads in France; Autoroutes; Routes nationales

The A104 Autoroute is a French autoroute linking Épiais-lès-Louvres (Val-d'Oise) and Collégien (Seine-et-Marne).

== List of junctions ==
Region	Department	Junction	Destinations	Notes
Île-de-France	Val-d'Oise	RN 104 - A1 - A104	Lille, Paris, Senlis, Goussainville, Louvres, Amiens (A16), Cergy-Pontoise (A15)	
Île-de-France	Seine-et-Marne	100 : Ch-de-Gaulle - Zone centrale	Mauregard, Le Mesnil-Amelot, Moussy-le-Neuf, Ch-de-Gaulle	
Île-de-France	Seine-et-Marne	101 : Ch-de-Gaulle	Ch-de-Gaulle	
Île-de-France	Seine-et-Marne	102 : Ch-de-Gaulle - Zone Cargo	Juilly, Tremblay-en-France, Ch-de-Gaulle, Centre commercial régional Aéroville	Northbound exit only
Île-de-France	Seine-et-Marne	RN 2 - A104	Soissons, Villepinte, Aulnay-sous-Bois, Marne-la-Vallée (A4), Lyon (A5), Dammartin-en-Goële, Saint-Mard	
1.000 mi = 1.609 km; 1.000 km = 0.621 mi

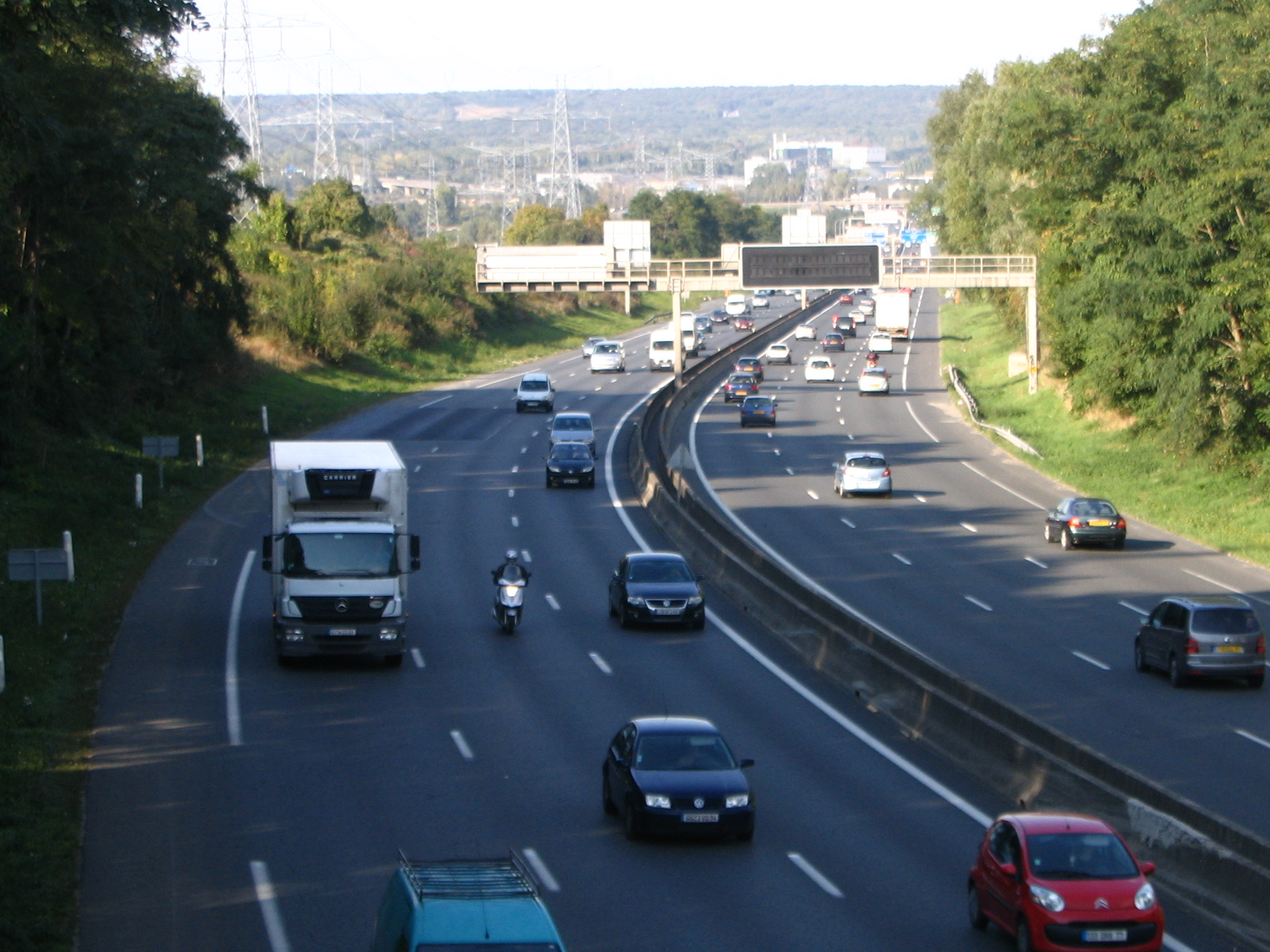
The A104 near of Torcy

Region	Department	Junction	Destinations	Notes
Île-de-France	Seine-et-Marne	RN 2 - A170 - A104	Dammartin-en-Goële, Soissons, Z.I. Mitry-Compans, Aulnay-sous-Bois, Villepinte, (A1) Paris, Lille, Ch-de-Gaulle, Amiens (A16)	
Île-de-France	Seine-et-Marne	5 : Mitry-Mory	Villeparisis - Gare, Mitry-Mory	Northbound exit only
Île-de-France	Seine-et-Marne	6 : Villeparisis	Villeparisis - centre, Bobigny	Southbound exit only
Île-de-France	Seine-et-Marne	6b : Meaux	Meaux, Claye-Souilly	
Île-de-France	Seine-et-Marne	6 : Villeparisis	Villeparisis - centre, Bobigny	Northbound exit only
Île-de-France	Seine-et-Marne	7 : Claye-Souilly	Villevaudé, Chelles, Claye-Souilly, Thorigny-sur-Marne, Pomponne, Le Pin	
Île-de-France	Seine-et-Marne	8 : Villevaudé	Meaux, Villevaudé, Base de loisirs de Jablines	Northbound exit only, Southbound entry only
Île-de-France	Seine-et-Marne	9 : Chelles	Chelles	Northbound exit only, Southbound entry only
Île-de-France	Seine-et-Marne	RD 934 - A104	Marne-la-Vallée - Val de Lagny, Lagny-sur-Marne, Coulommiers	
Île-de-France	Seine-et-Marne	10 : Vaires-sur-Marne	Val Maubuée - nord, Saint-Thibault-des-Vignes, Vaires-sur-Marne, Parc de loisirs de Torcy	
Île-de-France	Seine-et-Marne	11 : Collégien	Val Maubuée - centre, Val de Bussy, Torcy, Collégien, Centre commercial, Collégien, Torcy, Marne-la-Vallée	
Île-de-France	Seine-et-Marne	A4 - RD 471 - A104	Metz, Nancy, Reims, Val d'Europe, Lyon (A6), Troyes (A5), Évry, Sénart, Paris - Porte de Bercy, Val Maubuée - sud, Gretz-Armainvilliers, Tournan-en-Brie, Collégien-Z. A.	
1.000 mi = 1.609 km; 1.000 km = 0.621 mi
