= Francilienne =

Ring road in France

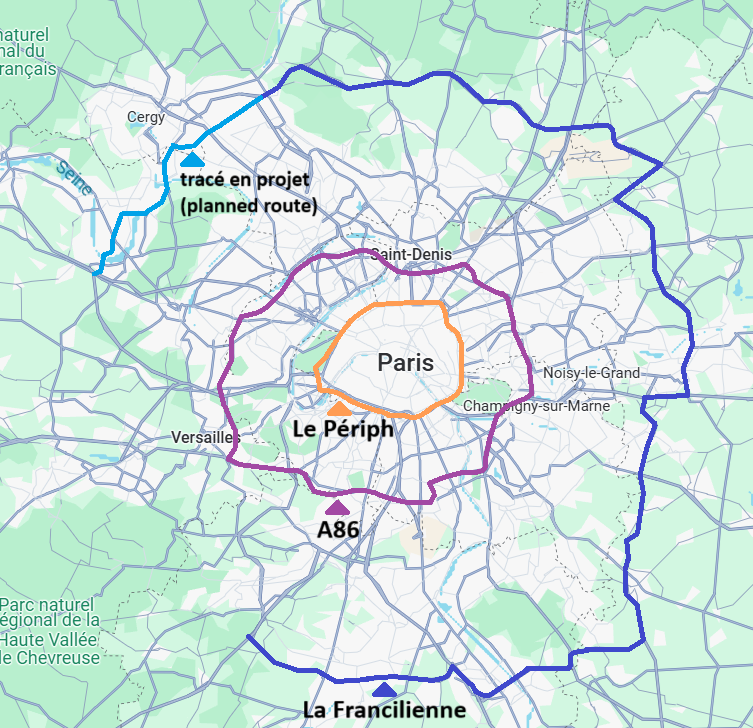
- A map showing the three main ring roads of Paris: Boulevard Périphérique (orange), Autoroute 86 (purple), and the Francilienne (indigo and turquoise)

Route information
- Maintained by DIR Île-de-France
- Length: 127 km (79 mi)
- Existed: 1979–present

Major junctions
- Northwest end: A 115 in Méry-sur-Oise

- A 16 in Attainville; E15 / E19 / A 1 in Épiais-lès-Louvres; N 2 in Compans and Mitry-Mory; N 3 in Villeparisis; N 34 in Saint-Thibault-des-Vignes; E50 / A 4 in Collégien and Croissy-Beaubourg; N 4 in Pontault-Combault; E54 / A 105 in Évry-Grégy-sur-Yerre; N 6 in Quincy-sous-Sénart; A 5 in Lieusaint; E15 / A 6 in Lisses and Ris-Orangis; N 20 in Linas

- Southwest end: E5 / E50 / A 10 / N 118 in Marcoussis

Location
- Country: France

Highway system
- Roads in France; Autoroutes; Routes nationales

Partially completed Grand contournement outer ring (blue) and three inner ring roads: the Francilienne (green), the A86 (dark blue) and Périphérique (innermost, orange)

The Francilienne (pronounced [fʁɑ̃siljɛn]) is a partially completed ring road in Île-de-France (the région that includes Paris), France, lying outside the A86.

The planned ring road is approximately 50 km (31 mi) in diameter, similar in size to London's M25 motorway. Started in 1970, existing segments cover about two-thirds of the ring, under different names (A104, N104, N184). Construction of the western sections, which would complete the Francilienne, was projected in the late 2000s to take place between 2011 and 2015. All future construction is to be to motorway standard and designated as A104 only.

However, in June 2013, the 'Mobilité 21' National Infrastructure Priority report pushed completion of the western section beyond 2021 and possibly 2030, relegating the Francilienne to a low-priority (second class) national infrastructure project (along with €80 billion worth of other road, rail, and river/port projects), behind €30 billion in high-priority (first class) projects likely to be the only ones built in France between 2017 and 2030, under currently projected budgetary constraints.

The southeastern portion of the Francilienne, the N104 between the A4 and A6, is severely congested and carries a high percentage of heavy goods vehicle (HGV) traffic. As of 2013, some portions of the N104 in the vicinity of the A4 were widened to six lanes (three each way). The French government has not yet designated any of the lanes as high-occupancy vehicle lanes.

The Francilienne is the third Paris ring road, outside the A86 super-périphérique, which in turn is outside the Parisian Boulevard Périphérique.

Outside the Francilienne itself is the very large, 1100 km-long, and incomplete Grand Contournement outer ring, the southeastern portion of which had yet to be constructed as of 2019.

== List of exits and junctions ==
Road	Region	Department	Junction	Destinations	Notes
RN 184	Île-de-France	Val-d'Oise	A115 - RN 184	Paris - Porte Maillot, Argenteuil (A15), Taverny, Bessancourt	
RN 184	Île-de-France	Val-d'Oise	86 : Méry-sur-Oise	Auvers-sur-Oise, Méry-sur-Oise, Frépillon	
RN 184	Île-de-France	Val-d'Oise	87 : Frépillon	Frépillon, Forêt de Montmorency	
RN 184	Île-de-France	Val-d'Oise	88 : Villiers-Adam	Villiers-Adam, Mériel	
RN 104	Île-de-France	Val-d'Oise	RN 184 - RN 104	Presles, L'Isle-Adam, A16	Clockwise exit and counterclockwise entry
RN 104	Île-de-France	Val-d'Oise	89 : Baillet-en-France	Baillet-en-France - centre, Bouffémont, Chauvry	
RN 104	Île-de-France	Val-d'Oise	90 : La Croix Verte	Baillet-en-France - Z. A. E, Montsoult, Domont, Sarcelles, Viarmes	
RN 104	Île-de-France	Val-d'Oise	A16 - RN 104	Calais, Amiens, Beauvais, L'Isle-Adam	Counterclockwise exit and clockwise entry
RN 104	Île-de-France	Val-d'Oise	91 : Attainville	Attainville, Viarmes	Counterclockwise exit and clockwise entry
RN 104	Île-de-France	Val-d'Oise	Aire de service d'Attainville (Clockwise)		
RN 104	Île-de-France	Val-d'Oise	93 : Villiers-le-Sec	Villiers-le-Sec, Mareil-en-France, Belloy-en-France	
RN 104	Île-de-France	Val-d'Oise	94a/94b : Mareil-en-France	Sarcelles, Le Mesnil-Aubry, Écouen	
RN 104	Île-de-France	Val-d'Oise	94a/94b : Mareil-en-France	Chantilly, Luzarches	
RN 104	Île-de-France	Val-d'Oise	95 : Fontenay-en-Parisis	Fontenay-en-Parisis, Mareil-en-France, Villiers-le-Bel, Goussainville	
RN 104	Île-de-France	Val-d'Oise	96 : Marly-la-Ville	Marly-la-Ville	
RN 104	Île-de-France	Val-d'Oise	97 : Louvres - Z. A.	Louvres - Gare	
RN 104	Île-de-France	Val-d'Oise	98 : Louvres - centre	Senlis, Louvres, Gonesse, Le Bourget	
RN 104	Île-de-France	Val-d'Oise	99 : Épiais-lès-Louvres	Roissy-en-France, Épiais-lès-Louvres, Zone Techniques - Aéroportuaires	
A104 (Roissy Eastern Bypass)	Île-de-France	Val-d'Oise	N 104 becomes A 104		
A104 (Roissy Eastern Bypass)	Île-de-France	Val-d'Oise	A1 - RN 104 & A104	Lille, Paris - Porte de la Chapelle, Survilliers, Senlis	
A104 (Roissy Eastern Bypass)	Île-de-France	Seine-et-Marne	100 : Le Mesnil-Amelot	Mauregard, Le Mesnil-Amelot, Moussy-le-Neuf, Ch-de-Gaulle	
A104 (Roissy Eastern Bypass)	Île-de-France	Seine-et-Marne	101 : Ch-de-Gaulle - est	Ch-de-Gaulle	
A104 (Roissy Eastern Bypass)	Île-de-France	Seine-et-Marne	102 : Compans	Juilly, Tremblay-en-France, Ch-de-Gaulle - Zone Cargo, Centre commercial régional Aéroville	
RN 2 & A104	Île-de-France	Seine-et-Marne	A 104 overlaps and becomes N 2 / A 104		
RN 2 & A104	Île-de-France	Seine-et-Marne	RN 2 & A170 - A104	Dammartin-en-Goële, Saint-Mard, Soissons	
RN 2 & A104	Île-de-France	Seine-et-Marne	RN 2 & A170 - A104	Villepinte, Aulnay-sous-Bois, Sevran, Tremblay-en-France	
A104	Île-de-France	Seine-et-Marne	N 2 / A 104 becomes again A 104		
A104	Île-de-France	Seine-et-Marne	5 : Mitry-Mory	Villeparisis - Gare, Mitry-Mory	
A104	Île-de-France	Seine-et-Marne	6a : Villeparisis - centre	Bobigny, Villeparisis, P. A. de L'Ambrésis	
A104	Île-de-France	Seine-et-Marne	6b : Meaux	Meaux, Claye-Souilly	Clockwise exit and counterclockwise entrance
A104	Île-de-France	Seine-et-Marne	6 : Villeparisis - centre	Bobigny, Villeparisis	
A104	Île-de-France	Seine-et-Marne	7 : Le Pin	Chelles - Courtry, Le Pin, Thorigny-sur-Marne, Villevaudé	Clockwise exit and counterclockwise entrance
A104	Île-de-France	Seine-et-Marne	8 : Villevaudé	Meaux, Base de Loisirs de Jablines	Counterclockwise exit and clockwise entrance
A104	Île-de-France	Seine-et-Marne	9 : Pomponne	Chelles - centre	Counterclockwise exit and clockwise entrance
A104	Île-de-France	Seine-et-Marne	RD 934 - A104	Marne-la-Vallée - Val de Lagny, Lagny-sur-Marne	
A104	Île-de-France	Seine-et-Marne	10 : Torcy	Val Maubuée - nord, Saint-Thibault-des-Vignes, Vaires-sur-Marne, Parc de loisirs de Torcy	
A104	Île-de-France	Seine-et-Marne	11 : Bussy-Saint-Martin	Val Maubuée - centre, Val de Bussy, Torcy, Collégien - centre, Centre commercial	
A4 & A104	Île-de-France	Seine-et-Marne	A 104 overlaps and becomes E50 / A 4 / A 104		
A4 & A104	Île-de-France	Seine-et-Marne	A4 & RD 471 & RD 499 - A104	Paris - Porte de Bercy, Noisy-le-Grand, Val-Maubuée - sud, Z. A. Pariest, Lognes, Z. A. E. Pariest, Croissy-Beaubourg Créteil, Cité Descartes; Reims, Metz-Nancy, Val d'Europe, Val de Bussy, Meaux	
A4 & A104	Île-de-France	Seine-et-Marne	A4 & RD 471 & RD 499 - A104	Gretz-Armainvilliers, Tournan-en-Brie, Collégien - Z. A.	
A4 & A104	Île-de-France	Seine-et-Marne	A4 & RD 471 & RD 499 - A104	Noisiel, Torcy, Val-Maubuée - centre	
RN 104	Île-de-France	Seine-et-Marne	E50 / A 4 / A 104 becomes N 104		
RN 104	Île-de-France	Seine-et-Marne	13 : Émerainville	Lognes, Émerainville, Val-Maubuée - sud, Croissy-Beaubourg, Z. A. E. Pariest	
RN 104	Île-de-France	Seine-et-Marne	13.1 : Croissy-Beaubourg	Croissy-Beaubourg	
RN 104	Île-de-France	Seine-et-Marne	14 : Roissy-en-Brie + Aire de service de la Soubriarde (Counterclockwise)	Pontault-Combault - Gare, Roissy-en-Brie - centre, Parc d'activité des Arpents, Parc d'activité de Pontillaut	
RN 104	Île-de-France	Seine-et-Marne	15 Berchères + Aire de service des Berchères (Clockwise)	Pontault-Combault - centre	Clockwise exit only
RN 104	Île-de-France	Seine-et-Marne	16 Pontault-Combault	Pontault-Combault - centre, Pontault-Combault - Z. A. Croix-Saint-Claude, Roissy-en-Brie - Morbras	
RN 104	Île-de-France	Seine-et-Marne	17a/17b : Bois Notre-Dame	Champigny-sur-Marne, Pontault-Combault - Pavé, La Queue-en-Brie, Chennevières-sur-Marne, Centre commercial	
RN 104	Île-de-France	Seine-et-Marne	17a/17b : Bois Notre-Dame	Nancy, Ozoir-la-Ferrière	
RN 104	Île-de-France	Seine-et-Marne	18 : Lésigny	Lésigny - centre, Férolles-Attilly	
RN 104	Île-de-France	Seine-et-Marne	19 : Lésigny - sud	Lésigny - Réveillon, Servon, Santeny	
RN 104	Île-de-France	Seine-et-Marne	20 : Férolles-Attilly	Férolles-Attilly, Servon	Counterclockwise exit and clockwise entrance
RN 104	Île-de-France	Seine-et-Marne	21 : Brie-Comte-Robert - nord	Brie-Comte-Robert - Z. A., Brie-Comte-Robert - centre, Créteil, Boissy-Saint-Léger, Servon	
RN 104	Île-de-France	Seine-et-Marne	22 Brie-Comte-Robert - centre	Brie-Comte-Robert	Counterclockwise exit and clockwise entrance
RN 104	Île-de-France	Seine-et-Marne	23 : Évry-Grégy-sur-Yerre	Combs-la-Ville, Évry-Grégy-sur-Yerre	Clockwise exit and counterclockwise entrance
RN 104	Île-de-France	Seine-et-Marne	A105 - RN 104	Melun, Réau, Troyes (A5), Provins, Moissy-Cramayel, Cesson, Vert-Saint-Denis, Évry-Grégy-sur-Yerre	
RN 104	Île-de-France	Seine-et-Marne	24 : Combs-la-Ville	Combs-la-Ville, Moissy-Cramayel Parc de l'Ecopôle	
RN 104	Île-de-France	Seine-et-Marne	25 : Lieusaint	Combs-la-Ville, Lieusaint, Parc du Parisud	
RN 104	Île-de-France	Essonne	26 : Forêt de Sénart	Paris, Créteil, Brunoy, Épinay-sous-Sénart, Quincy-sous-Sénart	
RN 104	Île-de-France	Essonne	A5a - RN 104	Moissy-Cramayel, Carré Sénart, Savigny-le-Temple, Troyes, Lieusaint, Melun	
RN 104	Île-de-France	Essonne	27 : Saint-Pierre-du-Perray	Tigery - Parc des Vergers, Saint-Pierre-du-Perray, Carré Sénart	
RN 104	Île-de-France	Essonne	28 : Saint-Germain-lès-Corbeil	Tigery - Bourg, Saint-Germain-lès-Corbeil, Quincy-sous-Sénart, Brunoy	
RN 104	Île-de-France	Essonne	Aire de service des Chevreaux (Clockwise); Aire de service de La Pointe Rigale (Counterclockwise)		
RN 104	Île-de-France	Essonne	29 : Étiolles	Étiolles, Soisy-sur-Seine, Corbeil-Essonnes - Rive Droite	
RN 104	Île-de-France	Essonne	30 : L'Apport-Paris	Évry-Courcouronnes, Corbeil-Essonnes - centre, Corbeil-Essonnes - Les Tarterêts, Z. I. de l'Apport-Paris, Ports	
RN 104	Île-de-France	Essonne	32/32a/32b : Corbeil-Essonnes	Corbeil-Essonnes - Les Coquibus, Corbeil-Essonnes - Les Tarterêts, Évry-Courcouronnes - centre, Centre Hospitalier	
RN 104	Île-de-France	Essonne	33 : Lisses	Lisses, Corbeil-Essonnes - Les Coquibus, Évry-Courcouronnes, S.N.E.C.M.A.	
RN 104	Île-de-France	Essonne	A6 South - RN 104	Fontainebleau, Lyon, Mennecy	
RN 104	Île-de-France	Essonne	34 : Évry-Courcouronnes - centre	Évry-Courcouronnes, Lisses	
RN 104	Île-de-France	Essonne	35 : Ris-Orangis + A6 North - RN 104	Évry-Courcouronnes - Bois Sauvage	
RN 104	Île-de-France	Essonne	35 : Ris-Orangis + A6 North - RN 104	Ris-Orangis, Grigny, Viry-Châtillon, Paris, Palaiseau	
RN 104	Île-de-France	Essonne	36 : Courcouronnes	Évry-Courcouronnes - centre, Centre Hospitalier	
RN 104	Île-de-France	Essonne	37/37a/37b : Bondoufle	Bondoufle, Bois de L'Épine, Parc de Saint Eutrope	Marked as exits 37a (Parc de Saint Eutrope) and 37b (Bondoufle) clockwise
RN 104	Île-de-France	Essonne	38 : Z. I. des Ciroliers	Aire de service de Fleury	Counterclockwise exit and entrance
RN 104	Île-de-France	Essonne	39a/39b : Fleury-Mérogis	Fleury-Mérogis, Grigny, Viry-Châtillon	
RN 104	Île-de-France	Essonne	39a/39b : Fleury-Mérogis	Le Plessis-Pâté, Brétigny-sur-Orge - Z. I.	
RN 104	Île-de-France	Essonne	40 : Sainte-Geneviève-des-Bois	Sainte-Geneviève-des-Bois, Le Plessis-Pâté, Z. I. La Croix Blanche	
RN 104	Île-de-France	Essonne	41 Saint-Michel-sur-Orge	Saint-Michel-sur-Orge - Montalons, Brétigny-sur-Orge - Rosières	
RN 104	Île-de-France	Essonne	42 : Brétigny-sur-Orge	Brétigny-sur-Orge - centre, Saint-Michel-sur-Orge, Longpont-sur-Orge	
RN 104	Île-de-France	Essonne	43/43a/43b Arpajon	Paris - Porte d'Orléans, Orléans, Étampes par RN, Leuville-sur-Orge, Linas, Montlhéry, Arpajon, Marcoussis	Signed as exits 43a (Paris) and 43b (Étampes) clockwise
RN 104	Île-de-France	Essonne	Aire de service du Fond des Prés (Clockwise); Aire de service de Beauvert (Counterclockwise)		
RN 104	Île-de-France	Essonne	A10 & RN 118 - RN 104	Paris - Porte d'Orléans (A6), Lille (A1), Z. A. Courtabœuf - est, Palaiseau, Bordeaux, Orléans, Chartres, Nantes (A11),	
RN 104	Île-de-France	Essonne	A10 & RN 118 - RN 104	Paris - Porte de Saint-Cloud, Versailles, Rouen (A13) Les Ulis, Boulogne-Billancourt, Les Ulis, Z. A. Courtabœuf - ouest	
1.000 mi = 1.609 km; 1.000 km = 0.621 mi

== See also ==
- Boulevard Périphérique
- A86 autoroute
