= Pont aval =

Pont Aval
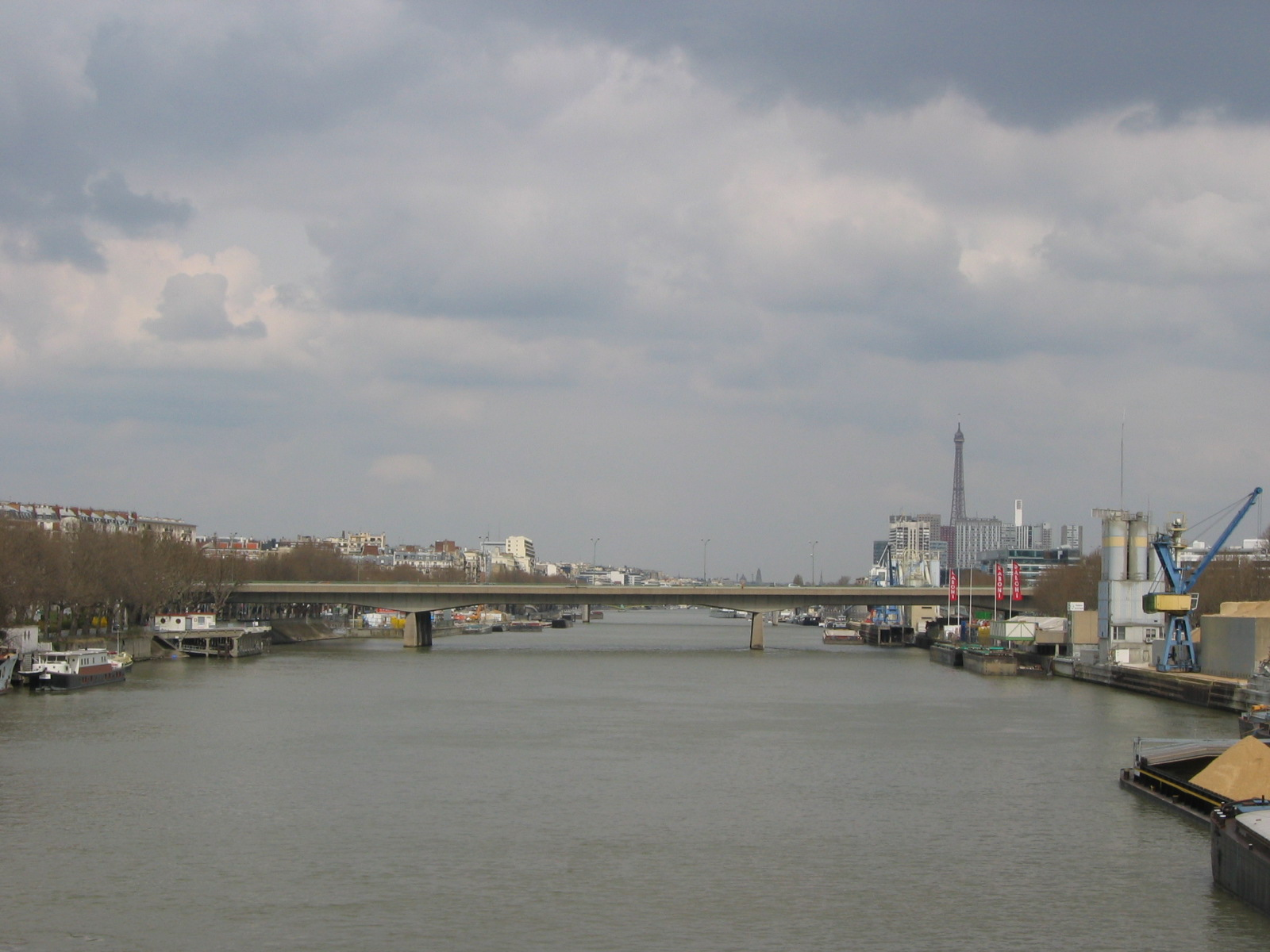
- Pont Aval
- Coordinates: 48°50′06″N 02°15′50″E
- Carries: Motor vehicles
- Crosses: The Seine River
- Locale: Paris, France
- Official name: Pont Aval
- Next upstream: Pont du Garigliano

Characteristics
- Design: Concrete
- Total length: 313m (1027 feet)
- Width: 35m (114 feet)
- Clearance below: ?

History
- Construction start: 1964
- Construction end: 1968

Statistics
- Toll: Free both ways

The Pont Aval (French pronunciation: [pɔ̃ aval]) is a bridge that crosses the Seine in Paris, France. It is open exclusively to motor vehicles traveling along the Boulevard Périphérique, a roadway which encircles the city.

== Location ==
Location on the Seine

The Pont Aval is the last bridge spanning the Seine if one were to follow the river's course downstream through the capital. The Pont Aval is located in the southwest of Paris, linking the 15th and 16th arrondissements, connecting the Quai d'Issy-les-Moulineaux and the Quai Saint-Exupéry. With a total length of 313 meters (1,027 feet), the Pont Aval is the longest in Paris.

== History ==
The bridge was opened in 1968. Like that of its sister-bridge, the Pont Amont, Pont Aval owes its name to its position on the Seine River: Pont Amont ("amont" meaning "upstream" in French) is the first bridge on the river as it enters Paris, Pont Aval ("aval" meaning "downstream") is the last.
