= Route nationale 2 =

Trunk road in France

National road 2
- Route nationale 2

Location
- Country: France

Highway system
- Roads in France; Autoroutes; Routes nationales

The Route nationale 2 (N 2) is a route nationale in northern France.

== Route ==
Paris-Soissons-Laon-La Capelle-Belgium (N 6)

== History ==
The N 2 was initially defined in 1811 as route impériale 2, running from Paris all the way to Amsterdam via Brussels, Antwerp, Breda and Utrecht. The territory north of the present border with Belgium was removed from France in the 1815 Congress of Vienna, and thus route 2 was truncated to that line. In 1824 it was renamed route royale 2, and in 1830 it became route nationale 2.

The former path to Amsterdam is now the N6 and N1 in Belgium and the N263 and unnumbered roads paralleling the A27 and A2 in the Netherlands.

== Description of Route ==
=== Paris to Soissons (0 km to 100 km) ===
The RN 2 starts at the Porte de la Villette in north-east Paris. Called the Avenue Jean Jaurès to Le Bourget crossing the A 86 autoroute and then A 1 autoroute (Paris to Lille). The road passes the Aéroport de Paris - Le Bourget. Where it turns east leaving the N 17. The road then crosses the A 1 and A 3 autoroute. The N 2 merges with the A 104 autoroute briefly as it passes south east of Charles de Gaulle Airport. The original road ran through the airport site and is designated by the D 902 to the south and D 401 through Dammartin-en-Goële.

The road now by-passes many of the villages and small towns on the original route such as Nanteuil-le-Haudouin. The road then passes through the Forêt de Retz. The road passes open country and war cemeteries to the town of Soissons on the river Aisne. The road crosses the N 31 (Rouen to Reims).

=== Soissons to Laon (100 km to 130 km) ===
North of the town the countryside is more wooded the road passes the Monument des Crapouillots. The road reaches the ridge on which the walled town of Laon sits. The road crosses the N 44 (Reims to Cambrai).

=== Laon to Maubeuge (130 km to 224 km) ===
The road heads north east over the A 26 autoroute (Calais to Troyes). The countryside is now flat and open. The road turns north after the small town of Vervins. The road then crosses the upper reaches of the Oise. At La Capelle the road meets the N 29 to Le Havre and the N 43 (Calais to Metz).

The countryside becomes more hilly on its way to Avesnes-sur-Helpe. At Maubeuge the road crosses the river Sambre, and also the N 49 (Valenciennes to Belgium). The road continues north to the frontier with Belgium and Mons becoming the N 6. The route eventually reaches Brussels.
