= Hôtel de Ville, Drancy =

Town hall in Drancy, France

Hôtel de Ville
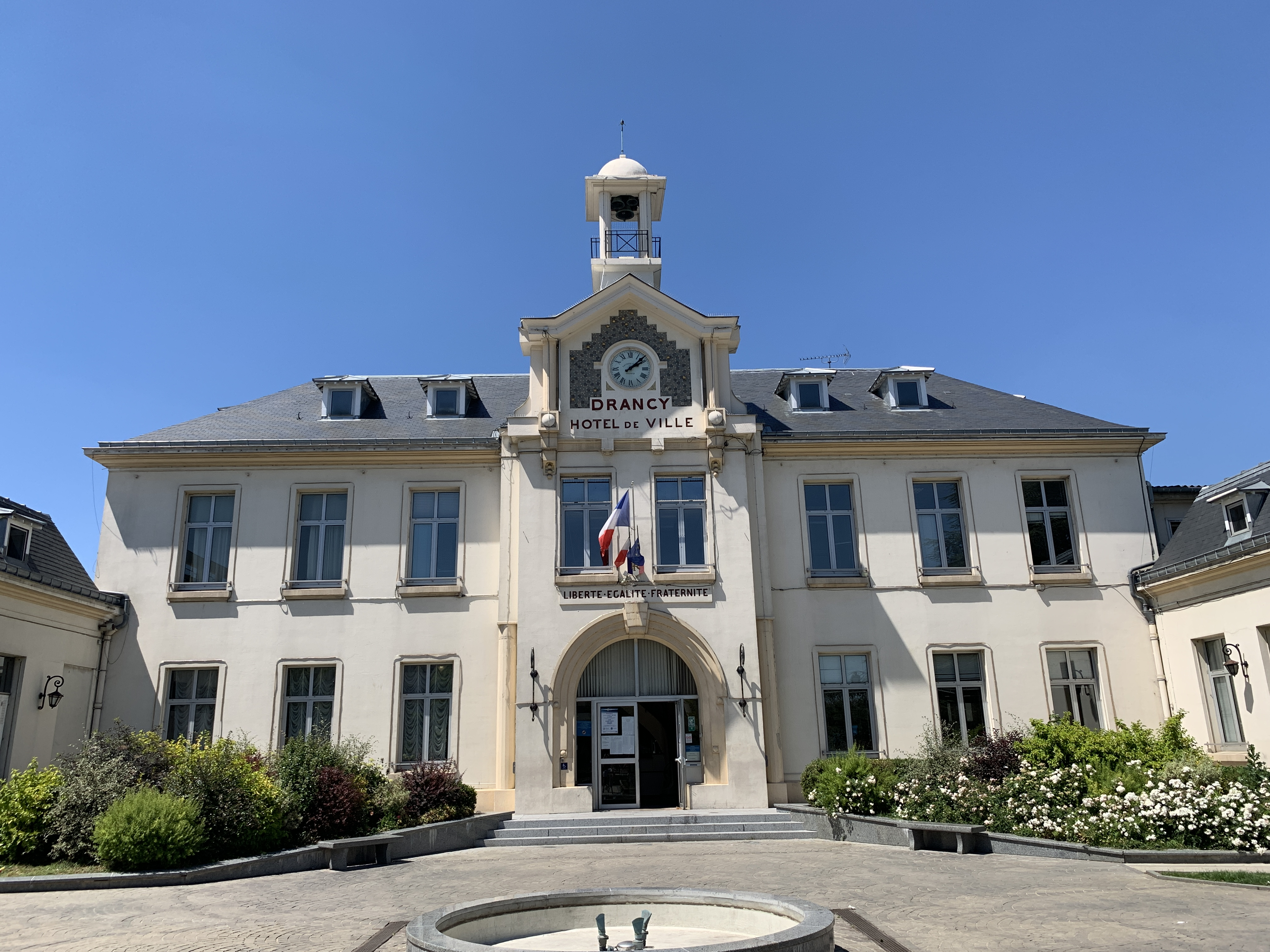
- The main frontage of the Hôtel de Ville in May 2020
- Interactive map of the Hôtel de Ville area

General information
- Type: City hall
- Architectural style: Neoclassical style
- Location: Drancy, France
- Coordinates: 48.9233°N 2.4450°E
- Completed: 1859

The Hôtel de Ville (French pronunciation: [otɛl də vil], City Hall) is a municipal building in Drancy, Seine-Saint-Denis, France in the northeastern suburbs of Paris standing on Place de l'Hotel de Ville.

== History ==
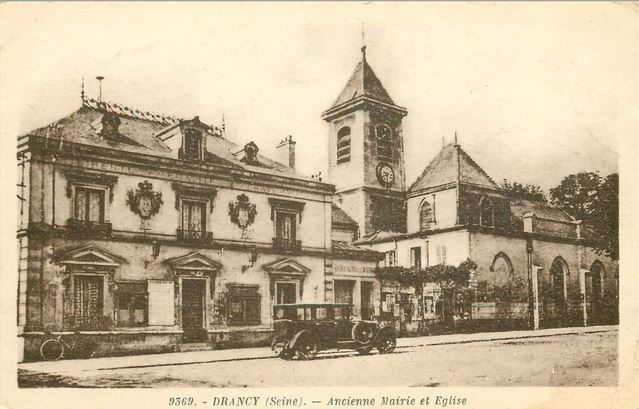
The old town hall (on the left) alongside the Church of Saint-Germain l'Auxerrois (on the right)

Following the French Revolution, the town council initially rented premises for its meetings. However, in November 1840, the council acquired the home of the Levasseur family at a cost of FFr 5,488. The building was located on the south side of what is now Rue du Père Liegibel, close to the Church of Saint-Germain l'Auxerrois, which has since been demolished. The design involved a symmetrical main frontage of three bays facing onto Rue du Père Liegibel. The central bay featured a doorway with a triangular pediment flanked by a pair of square-headed windows with similar pediments. There were three square-headed windows with cornices on the first floor and, at roof level, there was a dormer window in the central bay flanked by two oculi.

Following significant population growth, the council decided to acquire a more substantial building for use as their town hall. The building they selected was the former Asylum of Sainte-Berthe, built a short distance to the northwest along Rue du Père Liegibel on the opposite side of the road, which was completed in 1859. The building operated as a convalescent home for workers living in the local area and was named after Berthe de Ladoucette, daughter of Baron Charles-Loetitia de Ladoucette; she died at the age of 20. It later served as a girls' school managed by the Daughters of Charity of Saint Vincent de Paul.

The original design of the hospital involved a symmetrical main frontage of eight bays facing southeast onto a garden. The central section of two bays, which was slightly projected forward, featured two doorways on the ground floor and two casement windows on the first floor. The other bays were fenestrated with casement windows on both floors. The council acquired the building in 1920.

In 1930, works were undertaken to convert the building for municipal use. The works involved the creation of two new wings, which were projected forward, and the replacement of the two doorways with a large arched opening with a glass entrance, an archivolt and a keystone. At roof level, the council installed a clock, which was flanked by a pair of fluted columns supporting an open pediment and a small lantern.

Between 1941 and 1944, during the Second World War, the town hall was the venue where the deaths of numerous Jewish people who died at Drancy internment camp, including the poet, Max Jacob, were recorded. During the Paris insurrection, several members of the French Forces of the Interior were shot and killed by German troops outside the town hall. During the subsequent liberation of the town by the French 2nd Armoured Division, commanded by General Philippe Leclerc, Colonel Louis Dio established his command post in the town hall on 25 August 1944, and, from there, planned his attack on German troops in the adjacent commune of Le Blanc-Mesnil.

A small extension, designed in the modern style, was built in concrete and glass to the northwest of the original building on Rue Sadi Carnot in 1969, and a larger administrative centre, also designed in the modern style, was built in concrete and glass on the southwest side of Rue du Père Liegibel in 1984.
