= Canton of Torcy =

Coordinates: 48°50′17″N 2°40′41″E

Torcy
- Canton
- Country: France
- Region: Île-de-France
- Department: Seine-et-Marne
- No. of communes: {{{nbcomm}}}
- Area: 35.92 km^{2} (13.87 sq mi)
- Population (2023): 55,050
  - Density: 1,533/km^{2} (3,969/sq mi)
- INSEE code: 77 22

The canton of Torcy is a French administrative division, located in the arrondissement of Torcy, in the Seine-et-Marne département (Île-de-France région).

== Demographics ==
Historical population
| Year | Pop. | ±% p.a. |
|---|---|---|
| 2013 | 53,698 | — |
| 2018 | 53,875 | +0.07% |
Source: INSEE

== Composition ==
At the French canton reorganisation which came into effect in March 2015, the canton was reduced from 6 to 5 communes:

- Bussy-Saint-Georges
- Bussy-Saint-Martin
- Collégien
- Jossigny
- Torcy

== See also ==
- Cantons of the Seine-et-Marne department
- Communes of the Seine-et-Marne department
