= Grand contournement de Paris =

Paris outer orbital highways

The grand contournement de Paris (French for "Great Paris Bypass") is the fourth ring road around Paris, enclosing the three other ring roads (Périphérique, the A86, and the Francilienne).

The Grand Contournement is actually composed of two incomplete and partially overlapping rings of N-roads (routes nationales) and motorways (autoroutes) and known as the "First Solution" and "Second Solution", ranging from 80 to 200 km distance from Paris.

Originally planned to be completed in 2006 the "Second Solution" currently stretches in a clockwise direction for 826 km from Bourges to Troyes. The two rings overlap briefly as they pass through Rouen and again using the A26 autoroute between Reims and Troyes. A section of A26 between Troyes and Auxerre which would partially complete the Second Solution to Autoroute standard is not currently a high priority project and progress is envisaged only well after 2020, while no schedule exists for the remaining section of A26 between Auxerre and Bourges which is not programmed for construction at all. While the A26 is considered incomplete, the N77 and N151 are used to complete the outer ring.

The second solution has a length of nearly 1115 km and the tolls cost €67.80 as of 1 October 2011.

Although a complete ring, the First Solution uses routes nationales ("national roads" or highways) which are a mixture of single lane and dual carriageway for its northern and western sides. The N154 on the western side of the First Solution is (as of 2020) being upgraded to 2x2 dual carriageway with proposed bypasses to the east of Chartres and to the west of Dreux.

== Future improvements ==
A proposed motorway bypass to the east of Rouen (Contournement de Rouen Est) aims to construct a motorway-standard link of 44 km length between the A13 and A28 autoroutes by 2024, to be named A133 and A134. This would remove the last urban bottleneck on both the First and Second Solutions of the Paris Bypass.

== Northern part ==
- First Solution:
  - N31 (Rouen - Beauvais - Reims)
  - A26 (Reims - Troyes) (Overlaps with Second Solution)
- Second solution:
  - A28 (Rouen - Neufchâtel-en-Bray)
  - A29 (Neufchâtel-en-Bray - Amiens - Saint-Quentin)
  - A26 (Saint-Quentin - Reims - Troyes) (Overlaps with First Solution)

== Southern part ==
- First solution
  - A5 (Troyes - Sens)
  - A19 (Sens - Artenay)
  - N154 (Artenay - Chartres - Dreux - Évreux, then A154 - Val-de-Reuil)
  - A13 (Val-de-Reuil - Rouen)
- Second solution
  - N77 (Troyes - Auxerre)
  - N151 (Auxerre - Bourges)
  - A71 (Bourges - Vierzon)
  - A85 (Vierzon - Saint-Aignan - Tours)
  - A28 (Tours - Le Mans - Alençon - Rouen)
