= Drancy =

- Commune
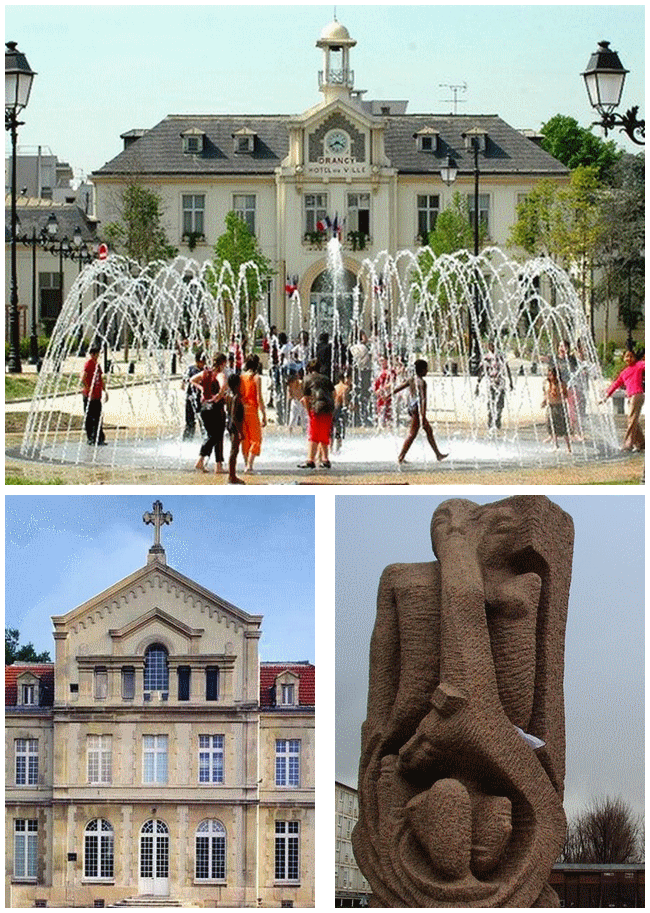
- From upper left: Hôtel de Ville, Castle of Ladoucette, National Memorial of Deportation

- Coat of arms

- Location (in red) within Paris inner suburbs
- Location of Drancy
- Location within France Location within Île-de-France (region)
- Coordinates: 48°56′N 2°27′E
- Country: France
- Region: Île-de-France
- Department: Seine-Saint-Denis
- Arrondissement: Le Raincy
- Canton: Drancy and Le Blanc-Mesnil
- Intercommunality: Grand Paris

Government
  - Mayor (2026–32): Jean-Christophe Lagarde
- Area^{1}: 7.76 km^{2} (3.00 sq mi)
- Highest elevation: 54 m (177 ft)
- Lowest elevation: 39 m (128 ft)
- Population (2023): 72,390
  - Density: 9,330/km^{2} (24,200/sq mi)
- Time zone: UTC+01:00 (CET)
  - Summer (DST): UTC+02:00 (CEST)
- INSEE/Postal code: 93029 /93700
- ^{1} French Land Register data, which excludes lakes, ponds, glaciers > 1 km^{2} (0.386 sq mi or 247 acres) and river estuaries.

Drancy (French pronunciation: [dʁɑ̃si]) is a commune in the northeastern suburbs of Paris in the Seine-Saint-Denis department in northern France. It is located 10.8 km (6.7 mi) from the center of Paris.

== History ==
=== Toponymy ===
The name Drancy comes from Medieval Latin Derenciacum, and before that Terentiacum, meaning "estate of Terentius", a Gallo-Roman landowner.

=== Origins to 20th century ===
In the 17th century, Drancy was divided into two distinct villages: Drancy le Grand and le Petit Drancy. The quarter "Village Parisien" is built on the old location of the hamlet of Groslay, which was surrounded by the Forest of Bondy: hence the name of rue des Bois de Groslay. The Hôtel de Ville was completed in 1859.

The end of nineteenth century was marked by industrialisation and the development of rail transport. During the Franco-Prussian War, Le Bourget was the site of an important battle and the castle of Ladoucette in Drancy was destroyed.

=== 20th and 21st centuries ===
During World War II, Drancy was the site of the Drancy internment camp where Jews, Gypsies, and others were held before being shipped to the Nazi concentration camps. In 1976, the Memorial to the Deportation at Drancy was created by sculptor Shlomo Selinger to commemorate the French Jews imprisoned in the camp. In 2009 the memorial was vandalised. The French government vowed to find those responsible for painting swastikas on it.

== Population ==
Historical population

Year	Pop.	±% p.a.
1793	399	—
1821	207	−2.32%
1846	352	+2.15%
1872	456	+1.00%
1881	606	+3.21%
1886	934	+9.04%
1891	1,104	+3.40%
1896	1,096	−0.15%
1901	1,247	+2.62%
1906	1,776	+7.33%
1911	4,190	+18.73%
1921	15,582	+14.04%
1926	31,489	+15.11%
1931	51,156	+10.19%

Year	Pop.	±% p.a.
1936	42,938	−3.44%
1946	42,166	−0.18%
1954	50,654	+2.32%
1962	65,890	+3.34%
1968	68,467	+0.64%
1975	64,430	−0.86%
1982	60,183	−0.97%
1990	60,707	+0.11%
1999	62,263	+0.28%
2007	65,843	+0.70%
2012	67,181	+0.40%
2017	71,318	+1.20%
2023	72,390	+0.25%

Source: EHESS and INSEE (1968-2023)

=== Immigration ===
Place of birth of residents of Drancy in 1999
Born in metropolitan France	Born outside metropolitan France			
75.0%	25.0%			
75.0%	Born in overseas France	Born in foreign countries with French citizenship at birth^{1}	EU-15 immigrants^{2}	Non-EU-15 immigrants
75.0%	2.1%	2.2%	6.1%	14.6%
^{1} This group is made up largely of former French settlers, such as pieds-noirs in Northwest Africa, followed by former colonial citizens who had French citizenship at birth (such as was often the case for the native elite in French colonies), as well as to a lesser extent foreign-born children of French expatriates. A foreign country is understood as a country not part of France in 1999, so a person born for example in 1950 in Algeria, when Algeria was an integral part of France, is nonetheless listed as a person born in a foreign country in French statistics.^{2} An immigrant is a person born in a foreign country not having French citizenship at birth. An immigrant may have acquired French citizenship since moving to France, but is still considered an immigrant in French statistics. On the other hand, persons born in France with foreign citizenship (the children of immigrants) are not listed as immigrants.

=== Heraldry ===
arms of Drancy	The arms of Drancy are blazoned : Azure, on a chevron Or a gothic letter 'D' sable at its summit, between two mullets and a sheep passant argent.

== Geography and cityscape ==
=== Climate ===
Data climate for Le Bourget (Seine-Saint-Denis) 1971-2000

Month	Jan	Feb	Mar	Apr	May	Jun	Jul	Aug	Sep	Oct	Nov	Déc	Year
Average low °C	0,9	1,3	2,9	5	8,3	11,2	12,9	12,7	10,6	7,7	3,8	1,7	6,6
Average °C	4	4,5	7,3	9,7	13,7	16,5	18,9	18,8	15,5	11,5	7	5	11,9
Average high °C	6	7,6	10,8	14,4	18,2	21,5	24	23,8	20,9	16	10,1	6,8	15
Precipitation mm	54.3	46.1	53.5	46.5	63.3	57.8	53.6	51.6	53.8	55.5	55.8	55.6	647.3
Sunshine hours	55.6	87.5	129.4	172.8	201.4	218.8	239.1	221.1	173.3	125.8	75.2	50.6	1749.5

=== Architecture ===
Drancy's buildings are too diverse to be characterised by any particular architectural style. Some of them with a style Art Nouveau are typical of the 19th and 20th centuries. There are housing estates and a garden city.

=== Park and Castle of Ladoucette ===
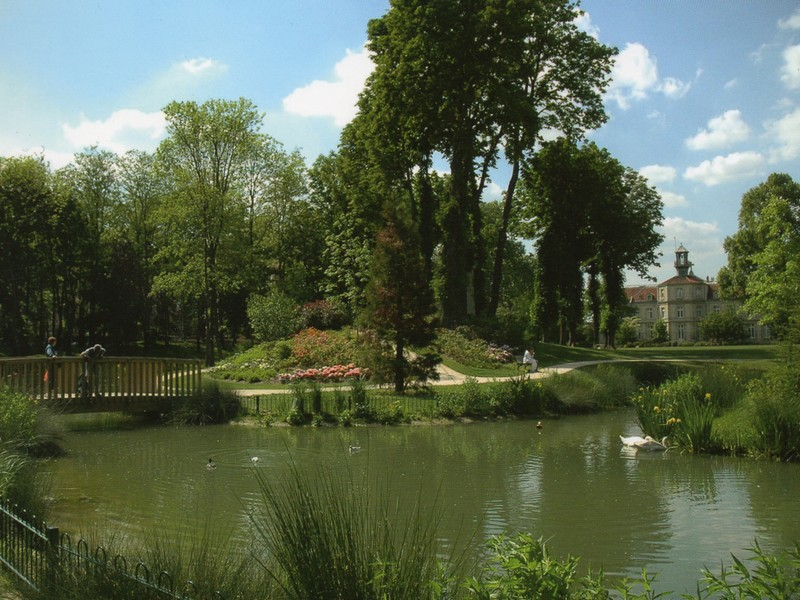
The parc de Ladoucette.

The parc de Ladoucette is the only park of Drancy. It contains a pond, a small educational farm and the castle of Ladoucette. The castle was built in 1533 by Pierre Séguier. In the 19th century, the castle was the property of the senator Charles-Loetitia de Ladoucette. In 1874 his wife, la Baronne de Ladoucette, died and her body was placed in the Mausoleum de la Baronne de Ladoucette. Today she is buried in the Parisian cemetery.

== Urbanism ==
Drancy is an urban commune, as it is one of the dense or intermediate density communes, as defined by the Insee communal density grid. (Note: According to the zoning of rural and urban municipalities published in November 2020, in application of the new definition of rurality validated on November 14, 2020 by the Interministerial Committee for Rural Areas.) It belongs to the urban unit of Paris, an inter-departmental conurbation comprising 407 communes and 10,785,092 inhabitants in 2017, of which it is a suburban commune.

The commune is also part of the functional area of Paris (Note: In October 2020, the concept of functional area replaced that of urban area in order to enable consistent comparisons with other European Union countries) where it is located in the main population and employment centre of the functional area. This area comprises 1,929 communes.

== Administration ==
Part of the commune forms the canton of Drancy. The other part belongs to the canton of Le Blanc-Mesnil.

== Transport ==
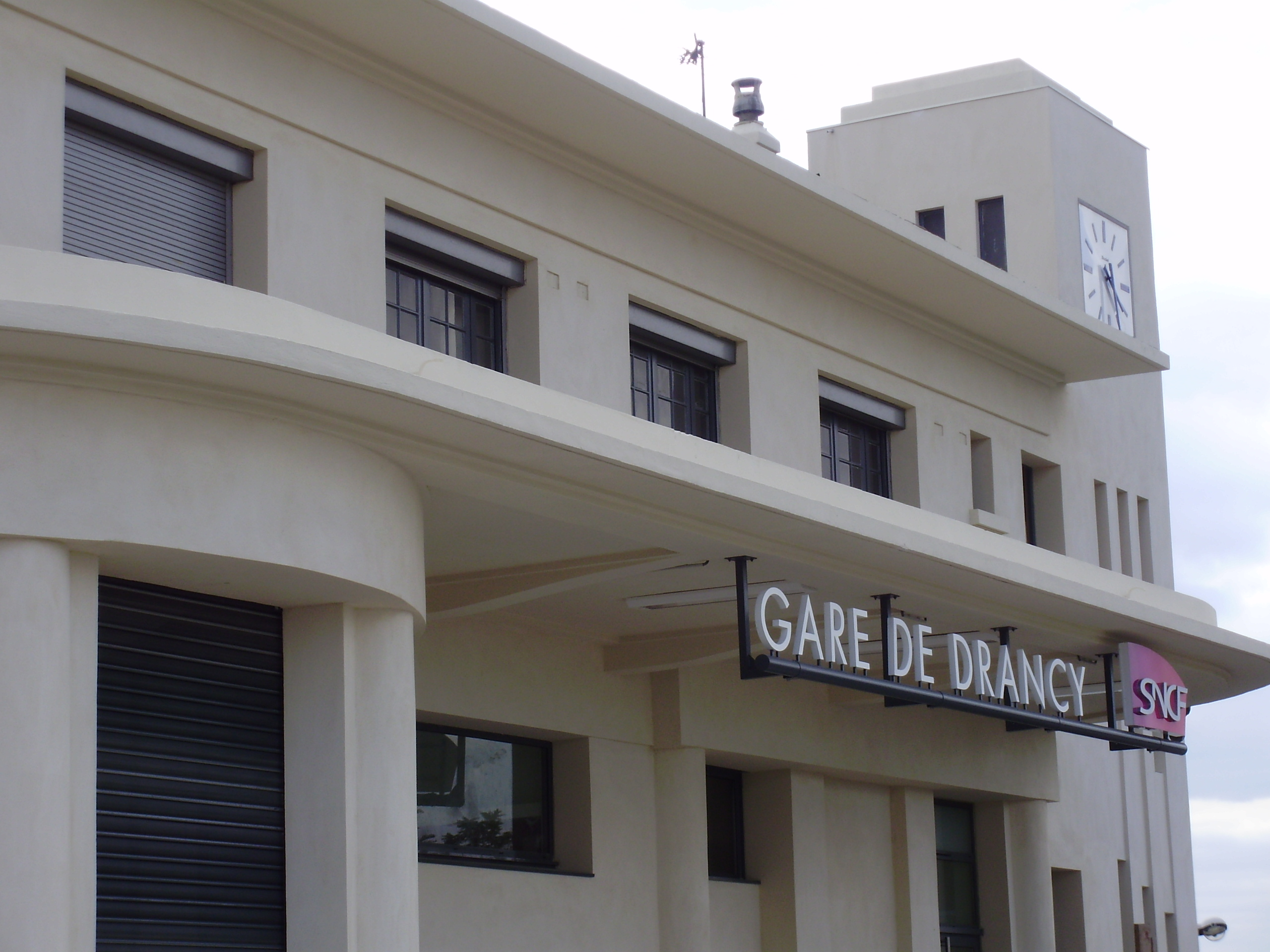
Railway station of Drancy

=== Railways and buses ===
The city is served by Le Bourget station and by Drancy station on Paris RER line B. Le Bourget station is situated near Drancy as well as the métro station La Courneuve–8 mai 1945 on the Line 7. The RER B is one of the five lines in the RER Rapid transit system serving Paris and its suburbs.

Drancy is also served by the Paris Tramway Line 1 with five stops and by twelve bus lines.

By the RER B, Drancy is near many Parisian railway stations, Gare du Nord is now just 10 minutes away, Gare Saint-Lazare and Gare de Lyon can be reached in 30 minutes. Charles de Gaulle Airport can also be reached in 30 minutes.

=== Roads ===
Drancy is served by the A3 motorway and the A86 motorways.

== Education ==
Schools:

- 17 public preschools (écoles maternelles)
- 19 public elementary schools
- Six public junior high schools (collèges): Paul Bert, Anatole France, Jorissen, Paul Langevin, Liberte, Pierre Samard
- One private junior high school, Collège Saint-Germain
- Two public senior high schools/sixth-form colleges: Lycée Eugène Delacroix and Lycée Paul le Rolland

== International relations ==
Drancy is twinned with:

(United Kingdom) Willenhall
(Germany) Eisenhüttenstadt
(Senegal) Gorée
(Serbia) Svilajnac

== See also ==
- Communes of the Seine-Saint-Denis department
