= Hôtel de Ville, Bussy-Saint-Georges =

Town hall in Bussy-Saint-Georges, France

Hôtel de Ville
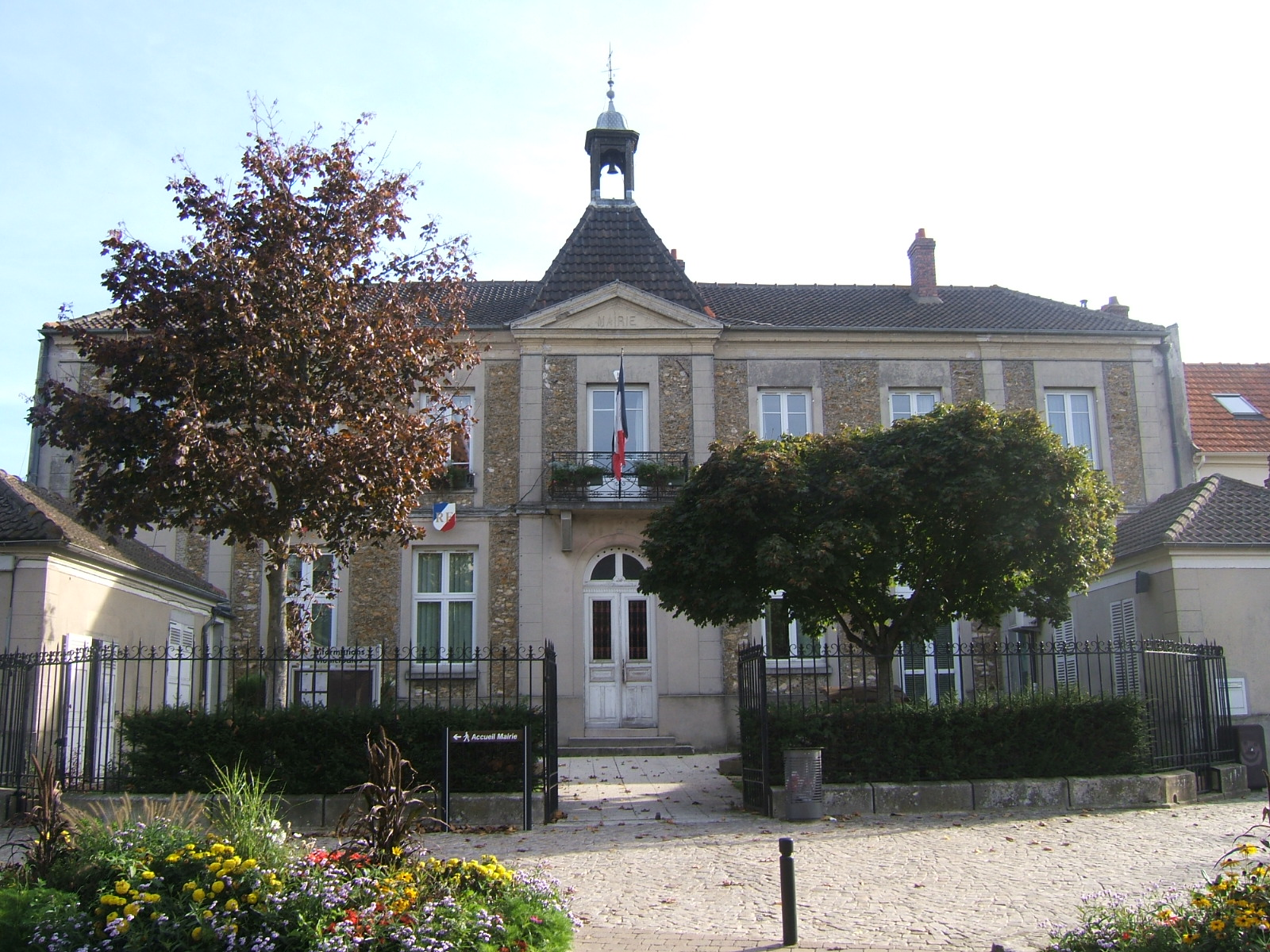
- The main frontage of the Hôtel de Ville in October 2006
- Interactive map of the Hôtel de Ville area

General information
- Type: City hall
- Architectural style: Neoclassical style
- Location: Bussy-Saint-Georges, France
- Coordinates: 48.8438°N 2.6981°E
- Completed: 1850

The Hôtel de Ville (French pronunciation: [otɛl də vil], City Hall) is a municipal building in Bussy-Saint-Georges, Seine-et-Marne, in the eastern suburbs of Paris, standing on Rue de Ferrières.

== History ==
Following the French Revolution, the town council initially met in the house of the mayor at the time. However, in the mid-19th century, in common with many other communes, the council decided to commission a combined town hall and school. The site they selected was on the east side of Rue de Ferrières in the heart of the old town, to the north of the Church of Saint-Georges and facing the tour-pigeonnier (dovecote tower), which is all that remains of the château which dominated the town until the mid-18th century.

The building was designed in the neoclassical style, built in rubble masonry with stone finishes and was completed around 1850. The design involved a symmetrical main frontage of seven bays facing onto the street. The central bay featured a round headed doorway on the ground floor, a French door with a small balcony on the first floor and a pediment above. Behind the pediment, there was a steep roof which was surmounted by a square-shaped belfry. The other bays were fenestrated by casement windows and there were quoins on the edges of the central bay and on the corners of the building.

The school was fully operational by 1854 and accommodated all children of primary school age, both for Bussy-Saint-Georges and the neighbouring village of Bussy-Saint-Martin. This arrangement continued until a new school, Le groupe scolaire Les Violennes, opened in 1986. This created an opportunity to extend the building and a new three-storey administrative block, designed in the modern style, was erected behind the town hall. The new administrative block incorporated a new Salle du Conseil (council chamber).

In August 2020, during excavation work in front of the town hall, construction workers found several human skeletons, dating back to the 1960s.
