= A86 autoroute =

Second ring road around Paris, France

A86 autoroute
- Paris super-périphérique
- Paris Super Ring
- A86 highlighted in red

Route information
- Length: 80 km (50 mi)

Major junctions
- Orbital around Paris
- A 14 in Nanterre A 15 in Gennevilliers A 16 ( E19 / A 1) in La Courneuve E15 / A 3 in Noisy E50 / A 4 E5 / E15 / E50 / A 6 E5 / A 13

Location
- Country: France
- Major cities: Antony, Bobigny, Créteil, Nanterre, Nogent-sur-Marne, Saint-Denis, Versailles

Highway system
- Roads in France; Autoroutes; Routes nationales
| ← A 85 | → A 87 |

The A86 (sometimes called "Paris super-périphérique") is the second ring road around Paris, France. It follows an irregular path around Paris with the distance from the city centre (Notre Dame) varying in the 8–16 kilometres (5.0–9.9 mi) range. The south-western section of A86 contains one of Europe's longest urban motorway tunnels (10 km (6.2 mi) of continuous tunnel) known as the Duplex A86, opened in two parts in 2009 and 2011. The tunnel is limited to a height of 2.0 m (6 ft 7 in) and commercial vehicles are prohibited as a result.

Although now a complete motorway-standard loop, the A86 is a product of its heavily urban route and piecemeal construction, meaning that there are several points at which one has to turn-off-to-stay-on (TOTSO) and sections which are briefly parts of the A3 and A4 autoroutes.

A86 is one of several ring roads that surrounds Paris and Île-de-France. The other ring roads are the Boulevard Périphérique, the Francilienne, and the grand contournement de Paris.

== History ==
=== Background ===
The first Paris beltway projects stretching several miles beyond the walls of the city began in the early 20th century. In the 1910s, Eugène Hénard proposed a ring road known as the "route des forts". This would have connected the fortifications surrounding the city which would thereafter have been replaced by parks. Several proposals advanced during the 1919 concours du Grand Paris (Greater Paris contest), including those of contest winner Leon Jaussely and runner-up Alfred Agache, similarly advanced the idea of a banlieue connected by a beltway. Agache's submission encircled the capital in three such roads, all connected by a series of radial expressways.

Between 1932 and 1934, Henri Prost developed the Prost plan, an urban infrastructure expansion roadmap for the region of Île-de-France. The plan introduced several radial expressways, such as the A12 and A13 highways' connection at the Triangle de Rocquencourt. All such expressways were connected by a series of bypasses which formed a loop several miles outside the city.

In 1932, Route nationale 186 was articulated as the main route from Versailles to Choisy-le-Roi. Gradual modifications developed it into a full loop which was relatively far from the city but not classified as an expressway.

=== Construction ===
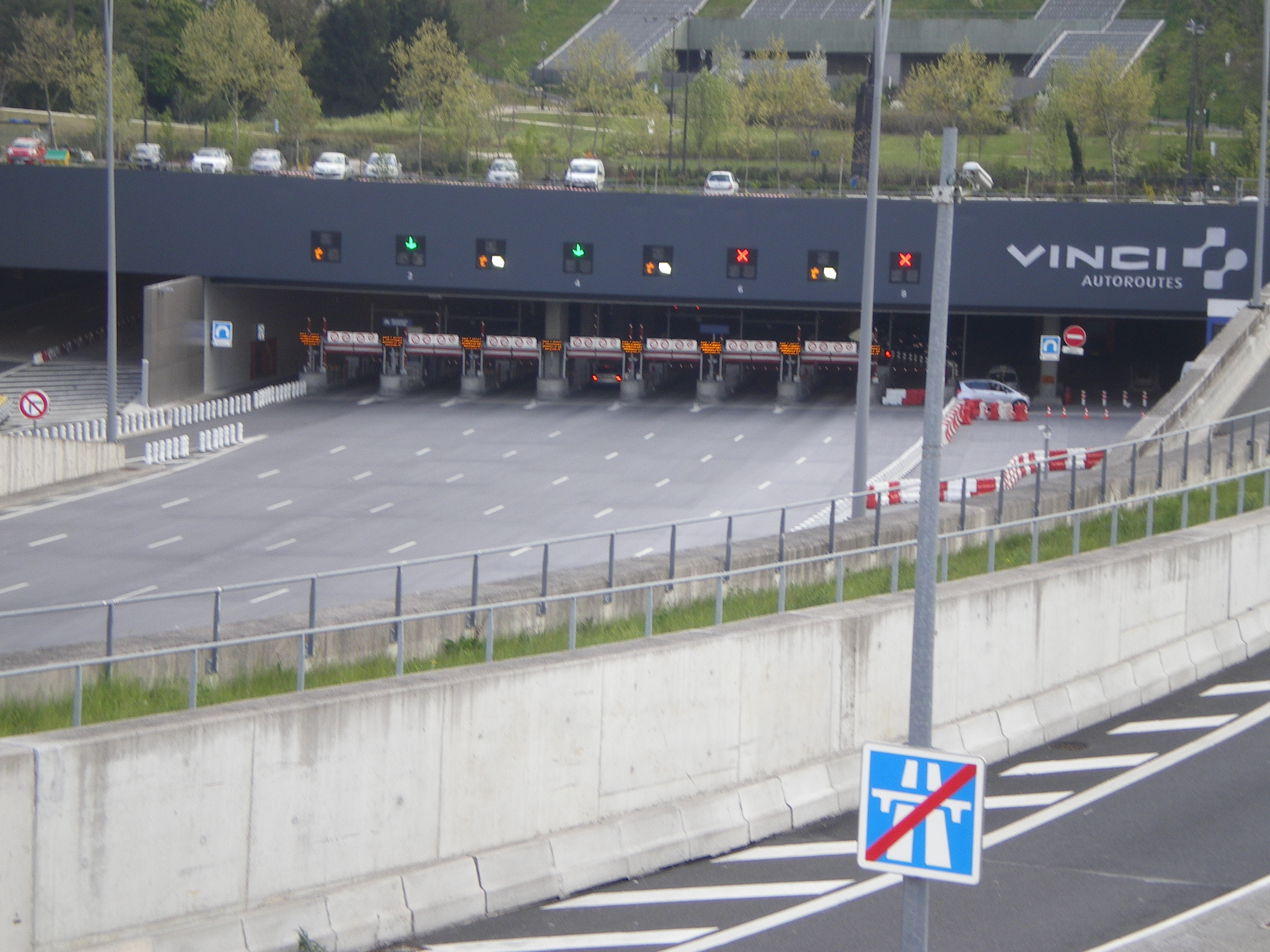
Tunnel entrance from the northern end

Construction on the A86 ring road began in 1968. By 1994, 50 kilometres (31 mi) of expressway were open to traffic. At the time, the following sections were opened: Nanterre–La Courneuve, Bondy–Thiais, and Antony–Versailles. By 2000, an additional 14 kilometres (8.7 mi) of expressway were open, with the only remaining section between Rueil-Malmaison and Vélizy-Villacoublay.

==== Duplex A86 construction ====
The remaining 10-kilometre (6.2 mi) section west of Paris would have to traverse through neighborhoods as well as environmentally and culturally sensitive areas. In 1988, Cofiroute conceived a tunnel along the said section. In 1999, Cofiroute was granted a construction contract and a 75-year concession to build and operate the tunnel, respectively. By that point, the tunnel was to be built as a single-tube double-deck tunnel. "EMMA", a tunnel boring machine (TBM) with a 11.56-metre (37.9 ft) diameter, was utilized to dig the tunnel. As a consequence of the Mont Blanc Tunnel fire, the tunnel was equipped with safety measures, including separating carriageways into separate decks.

The tunnel was divided into two sections, each of which were dug and opened in two different periods. Tunneling on the 4.5-kilometre-long (2.8 mi) northern section (Rueil-Malmaison–A13) and the 5.5-kilometre-long (3.4 mi) southern section (A13–Vélizy-Villacoublay) occurred in 2000–2003 and in 2005–2007, respectively. The northern section opened on 25 June 2009 and the southern section on 9 January 2011.

== Duplex A86 ==
Duplex A86
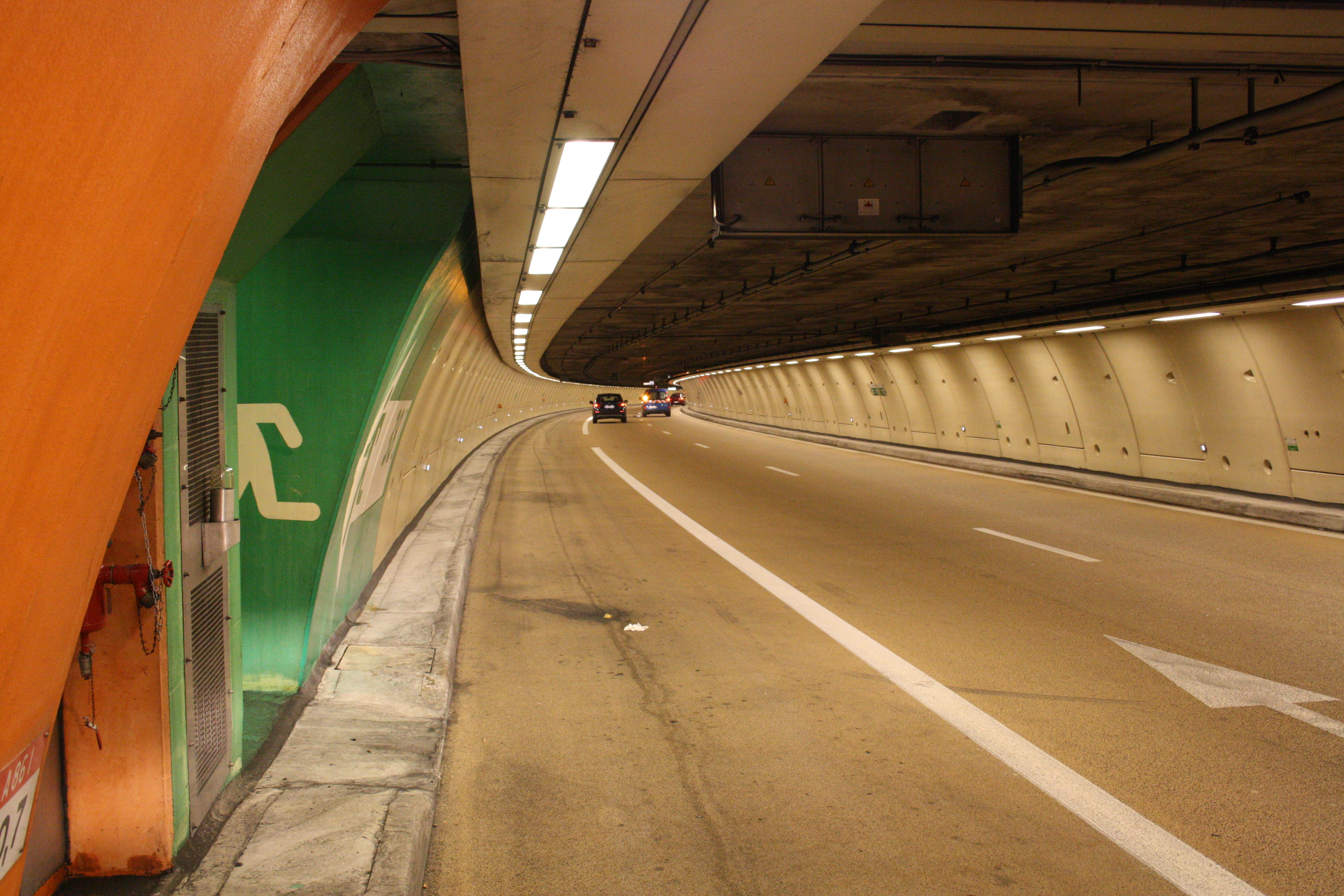
- Interior of the northbound tunnel. The hard shoulder is on the left because the fire exits are located on the left side, as shown in this picture. The reverse is true when going southbound.

Overview
- Location: Paris, France
- Route: A86 autoroute

Operation
- Opened: 26 June 2009 (Rueil-Malmaison); 9 January 2011 (Vélizy-Villacoublay)

Technical
- Length: 10 km (6.2 mi)
- No. of lanes: 2 per direction
- Operating speed: 70 km/h (43 mph)
- Tunnel clearance: 2 m (6.6 ft)

The Duplex A86 is a 10-kilometre-long (6.2 mi) motorway tunnel in Paris, which forms part of the A86. Unlike most tunnels, this one is a single tube, double deck tunnel. It opened in two stages: the northern section (Rueil-Malmaison–A13) opened on 25 June 2009 and the southern section (A13–Vélizy-Villacoublay) on 9 January 2011. It was initially open between 06:00 and 22:00. From 1 September 2009, it became operational 24/7.

Due to the nature of this tunnel, it has a height restriction of 2 metres (6.6 ft) which precludes large vehicles using the tunnel and has a speed limit of 70 kilometres per hour (43 mph). Motorcycles and vehicles with dangerous goods are also not permitted.

== Other ring roads ==
Other ring roads surrounding Paris or Île-de-France besides the A86 include the following:

- Boulevard Périphérique, a 35-kilometre-long (22 mi) ring road that demarcates the city limits of Paris.
- The Francilienne, a partially completed ring road of approximately 50 km (31 mi) in diameter and 127 km (79 mi) in length
- The Grand contournement de Paris, which are two wide loops bypassing Paris.
Overview of Paris ring roads. The outer Grand contournement de Paris compared with Francilienne (green), A86 (blue) and Boulevard Périphérique (orange).

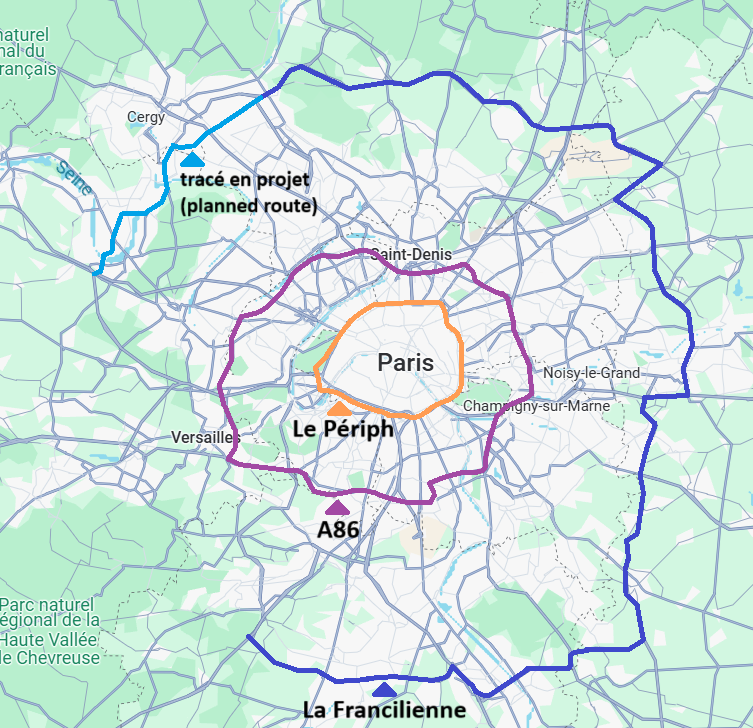
A map showing the three main ring roads of Paris: Boulevard Périphérique (orange), Autoroute 86 (purple), and the Francilienne (indigo and turquoise)

== List of exits and junctions ==
| Region | Department | Junction | Destinations | Notes |
|---|---|---|---|---|
| Île-de-France | Hauts-de-Seine | A14 - A86 | Poissy, Saint-Germain-en-Laye, Rouen (A13); La Défense, Paris - Porte Maillot | |
| Île-de-France | Hauts-de-Seine | 1 : Nanterre - Université | Nanterre - Parc, Nanterre - Préfecture | |
| Île-de-France | Hauts-de-Seine | 2/2a/2b : La Garenne-Colombes | Colombes - Z. I. de la Seine, Colombes - Petit Colombes, La Garenne-Colombes, Bezons | Signed as exits 2a (Colombes) and 2b (Bezons) clockwise |
| Île-de-France | Hauts-de-Seine | Aire de service de La Prairie (Clockwise) | | |
| Île-de-France | Hauts-de-Seine | 3 : Colombes - centre | Colombes - Europe, Parc départemental Pierre-Lagravère, Argenteuil - Val-Notre-Dame | |
| Île-de-France | Hauts-de-Seine | 4/4a Bois-Colombes | Argenteuil (Centre), Colombes (Centre, Parc d'Activités Kléber), Bois-Colombes | |
| Île-de-France | Hauts-de-Seine | 4b : Gennevilliers - Port | Gennevilliers | Clockwise exit and counterclockwise entrance |
| Île-de-France | Hauts-de-Seine | 5 : Gennevilliers - centre | Gennevilliers - Port, Gennevilliers - Le Luth | |
| Île-de-France | Hauts-de-Seine | A15 & RN 315 - A86 + Gennevilliers - Village | Argenteuil - Orgemont, Cergy-Pontoise, Amiens (A16-A115) | |
| Île-de-France | Hauts-de-Seine | A15 & RN 315 - A86 + Gennevilliers - Village | Paris - Porte de Clichy, Asnières-sur-Seine, Clichy) | |
| Île-de-France | Hauts-de-Seine | A15 & RN 315 - A86 + Gennevilliers - Village | Gennevilliers, Épinay-sur-Seine | Clockwise exit and counterclockwise entrance |
| Île-de-France | Hauts-de-Seine | 5.1 : Gennevilliers - Les Louvresses | Gennevilliers | Counterclockwise exit only |
| Île-de-France | Hauts-de-Seine | 6 : Villeneuve-la-Garenne - ouest | Gennevilliers, Villeneuve-la-Garenne - Z. I., Parc des Chantereines, Gennevilliers - Parc d'activités | |
| Île-de-France | Hauts-de-Seine | 7 : Villeneuve-la-Garenne - est | La Défense, Asnières-sur-Seine, Villeneuve-la-Garenne - centre | No clockwise exit |
| Île-de-France | Seine-Saint-Denis | 8a : Saint-Denis - Pleyel | Paris - Porte de Clignancourt, Saint-Ouen, Saint-Denis | Clockwise exit and counterclockwise entrance |
| Île-de-France | Seine-Saint-Denis | 8b : Saint-Denis - centre | Paris - Porte de la Chapelle, Saint-Denis | Clockwise exit and counterclockwise entrance |
| Île-de-France | Seine-Saint-Denis | 8 : Saint-Denis - Pleyel | Paris - Porte de Clignancourt, Saint-Ouen, Saint-Denis - Porte de Paris | Counterclockwise exit and clockwise entrance |
| Île-de-France | Seine-Saint-Denis | 9 : Saint-Denis - Stade de France | Paris - Porte d'Aubervilliers, Saint-Denis - La Plaine, La Courneuve, Aubervilliers | |
| Île-de-France | Seine-Saint-Denis | 10 : Aubervilliers | Aubervilliers, Saint-Denis - Franc-Moisin | |
| Île-de-France | Seine-Saint-Denis | A16 (A1) - A86 | Lille, Le Bourget, Ch-de-Gaulle | Clockwise exit and counterclockwise entrance |
| Île-de-France | Seine-Saint-Denis | 11 : La Courneuve - centre | Saint-Denis - centre, Saint-Denis - Universités, La Courneuve | Counterclockwise exit and clockwise entrance |
| Île-de-France | Seine-Saint-Denis | 12 : La Courneuve - 4 Routes | Paris - Porte de la Villette, La Courneuve, Le Bourget, Le Blanc-Mesnil | |
| Île-de-France | Seine-Saint-Denis | 13 : Bobigny - Z. I. Les Vignes | Bobigny, Hôpital Avicenne, Drancy, Pantin, Paris - Porte de Pantin | |
| Île-de-France | Seine-Saint-Denis | 14 : Bobigny - centre | Bobigny | |
| Île-de-France | Seine-Saint-Denis | 15 : Bondy | Bobigny, Meaux, Bondy, Ch-de-Gaulle, Aulnay-sous-Bois (A3), (A1) | Clockwise exit and counterclockwise entrance |
| Île-de-France | Seine-Saint-Denis | A 86 overlaps and becomes E15 / A 3 / A 86 | | |
| Île-de-France | Seine-Saint-Denis | A3 & A103 - A86 | Lille (A1), Le Blanc-Mesnil, Aulnay-sous-Bois, Ch-de-Gaulle; Paris - Porte de Bagnolet, Montreuil - centre, Romainville | |
| Île-de-France | Seine-Saint-Denis | A3 & A103 - A86 | Chelles, Le Raincy, Villemomble | No counterclockwise exit |
| Île-de-France | Seine-Saint-Denis | E15 / A 3 / A 86 becomes again A 86 | | |
| Île-de-France | Seine-Saint-Denis | 16 : Noisy-le-Sec | Centre commercial régional, Noisy-le-Sec | No clockwise entrance |
| Île-de-France | Seine-Saint-Denis | 17/17.2 : Rosny - Bois Perrier | Rosny-sous-Bois - centre, Montreuil - La Boissière, Le Raincy, Villemomble | Signed as exit 17 clockwise |
| Île-de-France | Seine-Saint-Denis | 17.1 : Rosny - centre | Montreuil, Rosny-sous-Bois | Counterclockwise exit only |
| Île-de-France | Val-de-Marne | 18 : Fontenay - Z. A. | Fontenay-sous-Bois, Le Perreux-sur-Marne | |
| Île-de-France | Val-de-Marne | 19 : Fontenay - centre | Chelles, Fontenay-sous-Bois, Le Perreux-sur-Marne | |
| Île-de-France | Val-de-Marne | 20 : Nogent-sur-Marne | Nogent-sur-Marne, Champigny-sur-Marne, Reims, Metz, Nancy, Marne-la-Vallée (A4), A5 | Clockwise exit and counterclockwise entrance |
| Île-de-France | Val-de-Marne | A 86 overlaps and becomes E50 / A 4 / A 86 | | |
| Île-de-France | Val-de-Marne | A4 - A86 | Lille (A1), Bobigny, Nogent-sur-Marne, Champigny-sur-Marne, Metz, Nancy, Marne-la-Vallée; Paris - Porte de Bercy, Charenton-le-Pont, Ivry-sur-Seine, Saint-Maurice | |
| Île-de-France | Val-de-Marne | E50 / A 4 / A 86 becomes again A 86 | | |
| Île-de-France | Val-de-Marne | 21/22: Créteil - l'Échat | Maisons-Alfort, Créteil - C.H.U. Henri Mondor, Créteil - Église, Créteil - Bordière | |
| Île-de-France | Val-de-Marne | RD 1 - A86 | Créteil - centre | Clockwise exit and counterclockwise entrance |
| Île-de-France | Val-de-Marne | 23 : Créteil - Pompadour | Créteil - centre, Troyes (A5), Sénart, Valenton, Bonneuil, Villeneuve-Saint-Georges, Parc Interdépartemental des Sports | |
| Île-de-France | Val-de-Marne | Aire de service de Pompadour | | |
| Île-de-France | Val-de-Marne | 24 : Vitry-sur-Seine | Vitry-sur-Seine, Paris - Porte de Choisy, Choisy-le-Roi, Thiais - centre, Alfortville | |
| Île-de-France | Val-de-Marne | A 86 becomes N 186 | | |
| Île-de-France | Val-de-Marne | 25b : Sénia | Centre Commerciaux, Sénia | |
| Île-de-France | Val-de-Marne | 25a : Thais | Choisy-le-Roi, Thiais - Grignon | Counterclockwise exit and clockwise entrance |
| Île-de-France | Val-de-Marne | 25 : Thais | Centre Commercial Régional, Centre Routier, M.I.N., Orly - Ville, Sogaris, Orly, Chevilly-Larue, Villejuif | |
| Île-de-France | Val-de-Marne | : Rungis | L'Haÿ-les-Roses, Rungis - Ville, SILIC de Rungis, M.I.N. | |
| Île-de-France | Val-de-Marne | A6b - RN 186 | Paris, Lyon, Évry, Palaiseau, Bordeaux, Nantes (A10) | |
| Île-de-France | Val-de-Marne | 26 : Fresnes | L'Haÿ-les-Roses, Chevilly-Larue, Fresnes | |
| Île-de-France | Hauts-de-Seine | 27 : La Croix de Berny | Paris - Porte d'Orléans, Antony, Sceaux, Bourg-la-Reine | |
| Île-de-France | Hauts-de-Seine | N 186 becomes N 385 | | |
| Île-de-France | Hauts-de-Seine & Essonne | 28 : Châtenay - Malabry | Châtenay-Malabry - centre, Verrières-le-Buisson | |
| Île-de-France | Hauts-de-Seine | 29 : Le Plessis-Robinson | Châtenay-Malabry - Haut, Le Plessis-Robinson - Boursidières, Le Plessis-Robinson - centre | |
| Île-de-France | Hauts-de-Seine | 30 : Clamart - Le Petit Clamart | (A6 - A10), Clamart, Z. A. Villacoublay, Bièvres, Igny (RN 118) | Clockwise exit and Counterclockwise entrance |
| Île-de-France | Hauts-de-Seine | 30c : Bois de Verrières | Bois de Verrières | Counterclockwise exit and entrance |
| Île-de-France | Hauts-de-Seine | 30b : Clamart - centre | Clamart, Châtillon, Paris - Porte de Châtillon | Signed as exit 30 clockwise |
| Île-de-France | Hauts-de-Seine | 30a : Clamart - Le Petit Clamart | Clamart | Signed as exit 30 clockwise |
| Île-de-France | Yvelines | N 385 becomes again A 86 | | |
| Île-de-France | Yvelines | RN 118 - RN 385 & A86 | Paris - Porte de Saint-Cloud, Boulogne-Billancourt, Meudon, Vélizy - Zone d'Emplois, Centre Commercial, Sèvres; Bièvres, Igny, Bordeaux, Nantes (A10 - A11) | |
| Île-de-France | Yvelines | 30.1 : Vélizy - Zone d'Emplois | Vélizy - Z.A Villacoublay, Centre commercial Vélizy 2 | No counterclockwise entrance |
| Île-de-France | Yvelines | 31 : Vélizy - centre | Vélizy - Z. A. Louis Breguet, Jouy-en-Josas | |
| Île-de-France | Yvelines | 31 : Vélizy - centre | Aire de service de Vélizy ouest (Clockwise); Aire de service de Clair Bois (Counterclockwise) | |
| Île-de-France | Yvelines | RN 12 - A86 | Versailles - centre, Porchefontaine, Plaisir, Dreux, Rouen (A13), Saint-Quentin-en-Yvelines, Rambouillet (A12) | |
| Île-de-France | Yvelines | A 86 becomes Duplex A 86 | | |
| Île-de-France | Hauts-de-Seine | 33 : Vaucresson + A13 - A86 + Péage de Vaucresson | Versailles - Montreuil, La Celle-Saint-Cloud, Vaucresson | |
| Île-de-France | Hauts-de-Seine | 33 : Vaucresson + A13 - A86 + Péage de Vaucresson | Rouen, Saint-Germain-en-Laye, Paris - Porte d'Auteuil | |
| Île-de-France | Hauts-de-Seine | Duplex A 86 becomes again A 86 | | |
| Île-de-France | Hauts-de-Seine | 34 : Rueil | Saint-Germain-en-Laye, Rueil-Malmaison, Bougival, La Celle-Saint-Cloud, Versailles | |
| Île-de-France | Hauts-de-Seine | 35/35a/35b : Pont de Chatou | Chatou, Rueil - 2000 | Signed as exits 35a (Chatou) and 35b (Rueil 2000) counterclockwise |
| Île-de-France | Hauts-de-Seine | 36 : Nanterre - centre | Nanterre | |
1.000 mi = 1.609 km; 1.000 km = 0.621 mi

== See also ==
- Boulevard Périphérique
- Francilienne
