= Boulevard Périphérique =

Ring road in Paris, France

- Boulevard Périphérique highlighted in red
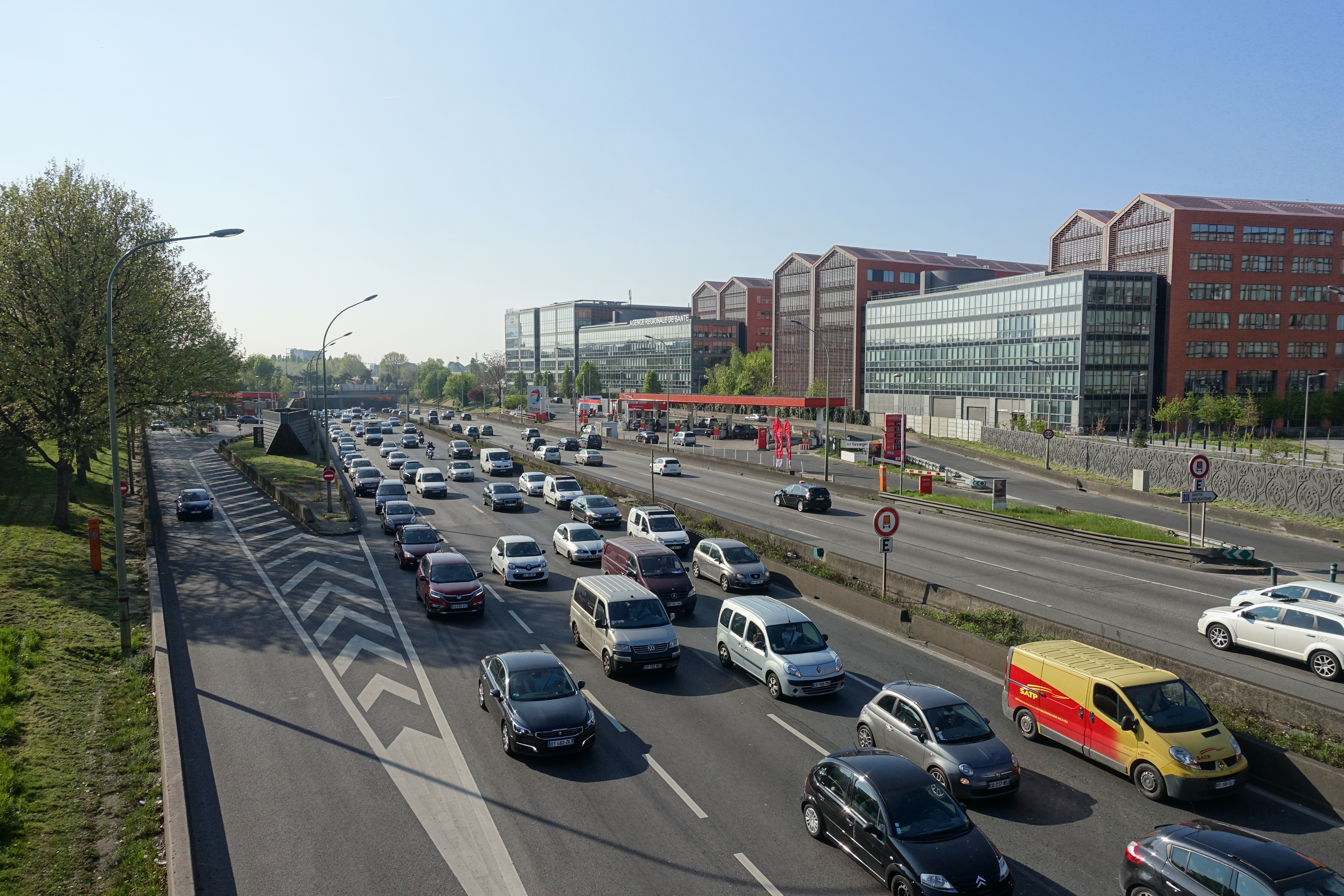
- The Boulevard Périphérique Extérieur near Porte d'Aubervilliers

Route information
- Length: 35.04 km (21.77 mi)
- Existed: 1958–present

Location
- Country: France

Highway system
- Roads in France; Autoroutes; Routes nationales

The Boulevard Périphérique (French pronunciation: [bulvaʁ peʁifeʁik]], {English} 'Peripheral Road'), often called the Périph, is a limited-access dual-carriageway ring road in Paris, France. With a few exceptions, it is situated along Paris's administrative limit.

The speed limit along the Périphérique is 50 km/h (31 mph) as of 1 October 2024. Each ring generally has four traffic lanes, with no hard shoulder. Its major interchanges are called portes. At junctions, vehicles in the rightmost lane (separated from other lanes in these areas by a continuous white line to the left) must yield to entering vehicles.

When travelling at the legal speed limit, it takes approximately 40 minutes to complete a full circuit of the Périphérique.

== History ==
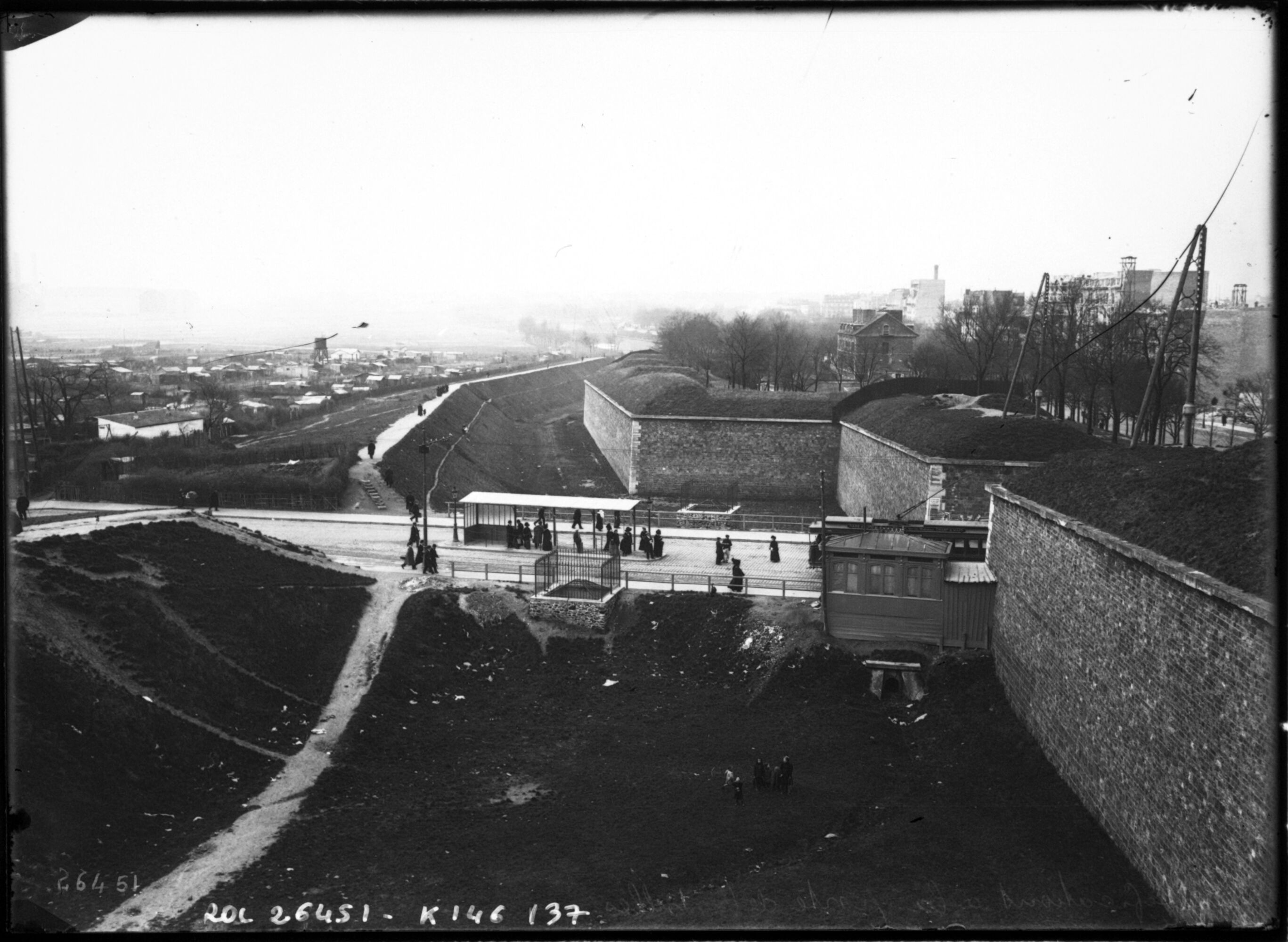
A portion of the Thiers wall, near Porte de Versailles, before it was torn down and replaced by an autoroute.

In 1844, the French War Ministry completed the defensive Thiers wall around Paris, including fortifications, a dry moat, a Rue Militaire and a large berm. In 1859, the military engineering department gave conditional control of the perimeter to the precursor of the current Paris city council. The expansion of Paris in 1860, achieved through annexation of bordering communities, created a situation where everything within the Thiers wall was Paris and everything outside was not. The Thiers wall led to a profound disruption of the synergistic relationship between Paris and its suburbs.

In 1861, the Paris city council started converting some sections of the Rue Militaire into boulevards. In the 1920s, the complete dismantling of the Thiers wall allowed further construction of what is today a series of over 20 connected boulevards encircling the city. This inner quasi-ring road came to be known as the Boulevards of the Marshals, as most of the boulevards bear the name of a marshal who served under Napoleon I. The road construction largely helped to reconnect Paris with its burgeoning suburbs. The Boulevards of the Marshals were almost fully completed by 1932, though the final three sections would not be added until 2005, closing the ring over 80 years after construction began. The Boulevards of the Marshals were built just inside the city limits, leaving a ring of vacant land just outside their perimeter.

Construction of the Périphérique began in 1958 on the remaining area once occupied by the Thiers Wall; the space not already taken up by the Boulevards of the Marshals measured anywhere from a few meters to the width of a city block. Unlike the Boulevards of the Marshals, the road bears only a single name, Boulevard Périphérique. In order to alleviate traffic congestion, the Périphérique was built more like a motorway than a wide boulevard, and was completed on 25 April 1973 under the presidency of Georges Pompidou. Used in a quarter of all Parisian traffic movements, it quickly became the busiest road in France. The Périphérique became a victim of its own success, plagued by widespread congestion and blocked from expansion by dense surrounding urban areas.

The top speed of the périphérique was lowered multiple times in its history. While initially being of 90 km/h, it was lowered to 70 km/h in 2014 then 50 km/h in 2024.

== Périphérique intérieur vs. extérieur ==
The Périphérique consists of two concentric carriageways: the intérieur ("inner ring") and the extérieur ("outer ring"). Vehicles travel clockwise on the inner ring and counterclockwise on the outer ring. Stretches of the road are sometimes referred to by cardinal direction. For example, in the southern half of the highway, the "inner ring" is designated as the Périphérique Ouest ("Western Ring"), as traffic there flows westbound, whereas the "outer ring" is designated as the Périphérique Est ("Eastern Ring"), as traffic flows eastbound. In the northern half, these designations are reversed.

== Structure and layout ==
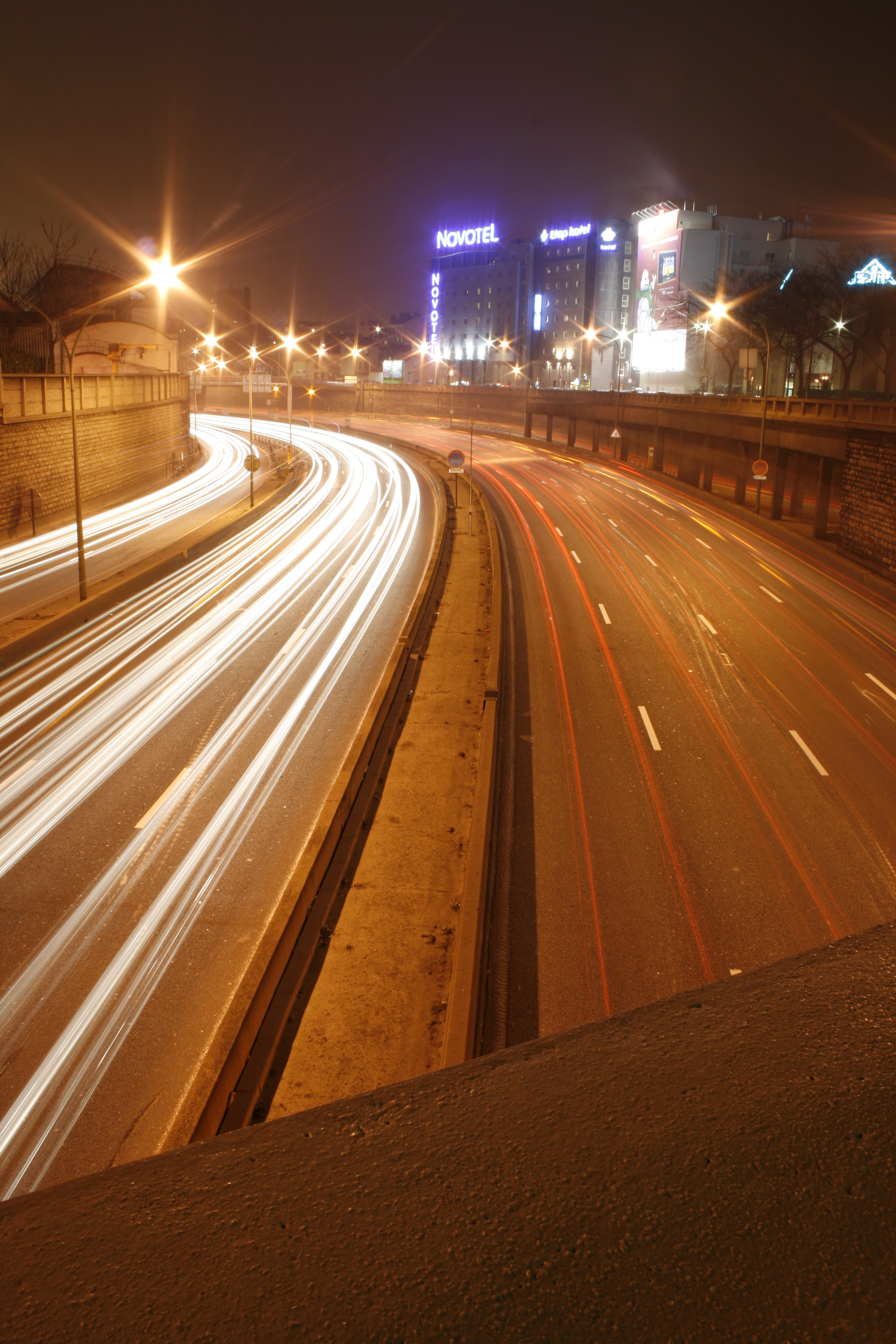
Paris' Périphérique by night at Porte d'Italie

The structure of the Boulevard Périphérique is similar to most French autoroutes, UK and Commonwealth nation motorways, and American freeways in the following ways:

- It is a two-ring, multiple-lane controlled access road with no at-grade crossings or traffic lights. Maximum longitudinal slope is 4%.
- Traffic in opposite directions is separated by a median strip.

But the Périphérique is also different from some of its domestic and foreign counterparts:

- Motorists entering the right-hand lane have the right-of-way, i.e. priority over vehicles already on the ring road. This stems from the traditional rules governing Parisian boulevards.
- The right-hand lane is reserved for vehicles entering or preparing to leave the "normal" movement of vehicles in the other lanes, or the Boulevard itself. A solid white line separates recently entered traffic and circulating traffic. This is to prevent entering traffic from disrupting the flow of circulating traffic in the inner lanes, since all traffic would otherwise have to yield to any entering traffic, across all lanes.
- There is no hard shoulder (emergency lane), except around the Porte de Gentilly. This means that crashes can cause considerable disruption to traffic, making it difficult for emergency services to reach the scene of a crash.

There are generally four lanes in each of the two rings of the Boulevard. Variations exist:

- A two-lane section between the Porte d'Italie and the Porte d'Orléans
- A five-lane section between the Porte de Montreuil and Porte de Bagnolet
- A three-lane section between the Porte d'Orléans and the Porte de Sèvres.

The entire Boulevard Périphérique is 35.04 kilometres long, as measured along the central median strip. The route closely follows the municipal boundaries of Paris, but diverges in the Bois de Boulogne and Bois de Vincennes (where the roadway is cut and covered), and the Paris Heliport. Because the Boulevard was built over the old Thiers Wall, its entrance/exit ramps and interchanges coincide with locations of the wall's former city gates, or portes. The road crosses the River Seine via bridges upstream at Charenton/Bercy and downstream at Saint-Cloud/Issy.

Small distance markers are distributed evenly alongside the roadway:

- The 00.0 kilometre point is over the River Seine, upstream of the Porte de Bercy, at the bridge's expansion joints.
- Distances from this point increase in the clockwise direction.
- The distance markers on the sign are underlined in red on the inner ring road, and in blue on the outer ring.

The roadway varies in elevation:

- 50% is elevated above its surroundings, i.e. above grade.
- 40% is constructed in trench sections, i.e. below grade.
- 10% is at ground level, i.e. at grade.

The Boulevard Périphérique can carry the heaviest vehicles allowed by French regulations. There is a height restriction of 4.75 metres (15 feet, 8 inches).

== Speed control ==
The Boulevard Périphérique is equipped with speed cameras to enforce the 50 km/h (31 mph) speed limit. The cameras are oriented to photograph vehicle plates from behind, and are reportedly located near the following interchanges:

On the inner ring, at:

- Porte de Sèvres
- Porte de Champerret
- crossing the Quai d'Ivry, at the end of the bridge
- Porte de Bagnolet

On the outer ring, at:

- Porte de Châtillon
- Porte de Clichy
- Porte de Pantin
- Porte d'Auteuil

In addition, the Périphérique's exit ramps are often monitored with hand-held binocular-type radar devices; these are triggered when the 50 km/h (31 mph) exiting limit is exceeded.

Finally, during rush hour, radar-equipped police vehicles are often positioned in hidden areas for further spot checks.

== Network monitoring and traffic management ==
Approximately one hundred traffic cameras are installed along the Périphérique, directly connected to the control room of its traffic management office. There are 166 emergency telephones, located every 500 metres along the ring road (every 250 metres underground), which handle 7,000 calls per year. The emergency phones are all numbered, with odd-numbered phones on the outer ring and even-numbered ones on the inner ring road.

Eight police vehicles continuously patrol the Périphérique during the day; four do so at night.

750 sensors embedded in the road surface record each passing vehicle, measuring flow rate, occupancy rate and/or traffic velocity on given portions of the Périphérique. Variable-message signs provide information on the estimated journey time to the next major exit, automatically generating updates every minute via a computer system using data from the sensors. The system also displays general information on accidents, road closures and road work.

== Other ring roads ==
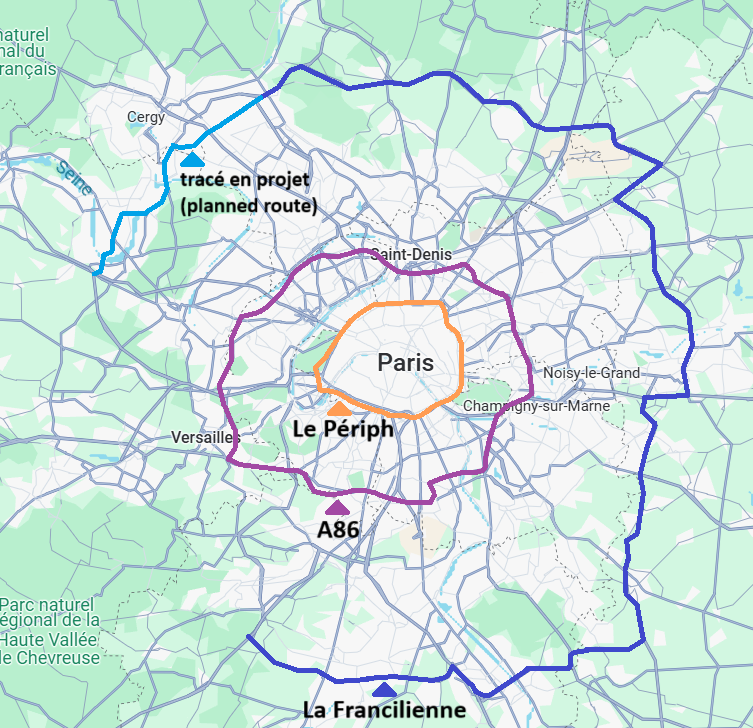
A map showing the three main ring roads of Paris: Boulevard Périphérique (orange), Autoroute 86 (purple), and the Francilienne (indigo and turquoise)

The Boulevard Périphérique is not the only means of bypassing the interior of the French capital:

- Within the city boundaries, the Boulevards des Marechaux (Boulevards of the Marshals) encircle Paris, approximately 100 m inside the Périphérique. This is a collection of urban streets with standard crossings with other streets or tunnels under some major routes of entry. The speed limit is 50 km/h.
- Beyond the city boundaries, the A86 (also known as the super-périphérique) encircles Paris at a distance of 2–7 km from the Périphérique.
- Approximately 20 km from the Périphérique, a partially completed ring road called the Francilienne.
- Another project, the Grand contournement de Paris, has also been partially constructed.

== Map ==
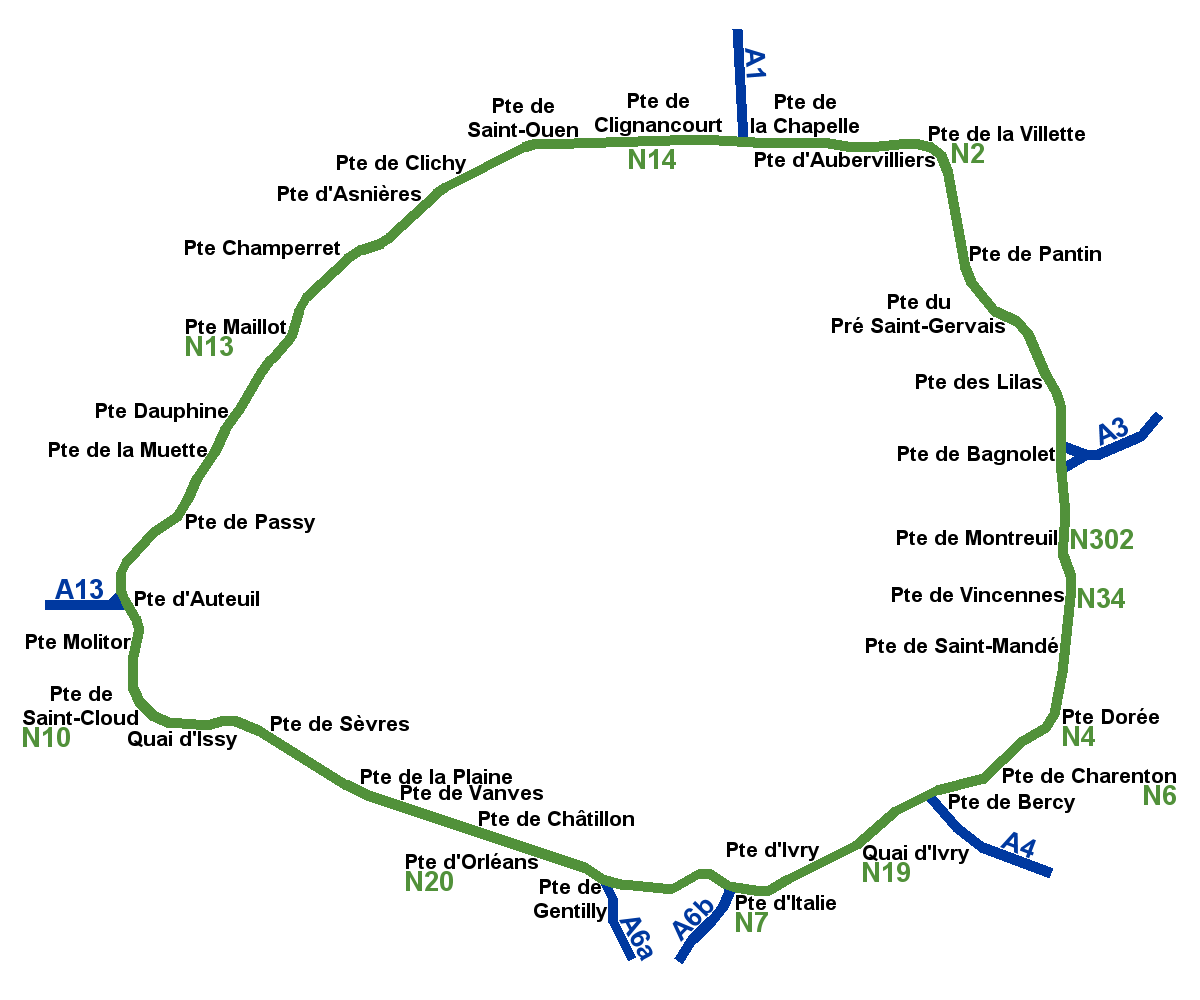

== List of junctions ==
Junction number	Junction name	Outer lanes exits	Inner lanes exits
1	Porte de Bercy	A4	Quai de Bercy
2	Porte d'Ivry	None	Avenue d'Ivry
3	Porte d'Italie	A6^{B}	Avenue d'Italie
4	Porte de Gentilly	A6^{A}	Rue de l'Amiral Mouchez
5	Porte d'Orléans	Avenue Aristide Briand	Avenue du Maine
6	Porte de Châtillon	Avenue Pierre Brossollette	Avenue Jean Moulin
7	Porte de Vanves	Rue Ernest Renan	Boulevard Brune
8	Porte Brancion	Rue Jean Bleuzen	Avenue de la Porte-Brancion
9	Porte de la Plaine	Rue Camliant	Place des Insurges de Varsovie
10	Porte de Sèvres	None	Rue Balard
11	Porte de Saint-Cloud	Route de la Reine	Avenue de Versailles
12	Porte Molitor	Boulevard d'Auteuil	Rue Poussin
13	Porte d'Auteuil	A13	Rue Poussin
14	Porte de Passy	Rue de l'Hippodrome	Rue de Ranelagh
15	Porte de la Muette	None	Avenue H. Martin
16	Porte Dauphine	Route de Suresnes	Avenue Foch
17	Porte Maillot	Avenue Charles De Gaulle	Avenue de la Grande Armée
18	Porte de Champerret	Boulevard Bineau	Avenue de Villiers
19	Porte d'Asnières	Rue Victor Hugo	Rue de Tocqueville
20	Porte de Clichy	Boulevard Jean Jaurès	Avenue de Clichy
21	Porte de Saint-Ouen	Avenue Gabriel Péri	Avenue de Saint-Ouen
22	Porte de Clignancourt	Avenue Michelet	Boulevard Ornano
23	Porte de la Chapelle	A1	Rue de la Chapelle
24	Porte d'Aubervilliers	Avenue Victor Hugo	Rue d'Aubervilliers
25	Porte de la Villette	Avenue Jean Jaurès	Avenue de Flandre
26	Porte de Pantin	Avenue Jean Lolive	Avenue Jean Jaurès
27	Porte du Pré-Saint-Gervais	Rue Gabriel Péri	Rue Haxo
28	Porte des Lilas	Rue de Paris	Rue de Belleville
29	Porte de Bagnolet	A3	Rue Belgrand
30	Porte de Montreuil	Rue de Paris	Rue d'Avron
31	Porte de Vincennes	Avenue de Paris	Cours de Vincennes
32	Porte de Saint-Mandé	Avenue Victor Hugo	Avenue de Saint-Mandé
33	Porte Dorée	Route de ceinture du Lac-Daumesnil	Avenue Daumesnil
34	Porte de Charenton	Avenue de Gravelle	Rue de Charenton

== Statistics ==
- Traffic in 2010 consisted of:
  - Around 240,000 vehicles per day, i.e. 2% of all trips in Paris, and significantly less than those made by bicycle.
  - 89% cars and light trucks, 7% trucks, 4% motorcycles
- Total length: 35.04 km (21.77 mi)
- Average trip length: 7 km (4.3 mi)
- Speed limit: 70 km/h (43 mph). (Gradually changed to 50 km/h (31 mph) from 1 October 2024 to 10 October 2024)
- Average speed on working days (7:00 am–9:00 pm): 43 km/h (27 mph)

== See also ==
- Boulevards of the Marshals
- Périphérique (Caen)
- A86 autoroute
- Francilienne
