= A3 autoroute =

Controlled-access highway from Paris to the A1 near CDG Airport

A3 autoroute

Route information
- Part of E15
- Length: 17.8 km (11.1 mi)
- Existed: 1969–present

Major junctions
- South end: Paris (Porte de Bagnolet)
- E15 Boulevard Périphérique in Paris: A 86 in Rosny-sous-Bois and Bondy; A 170 in Gonesse

- North end: E19 / A 1 in Roissy-en-France near CDG Airport

Location
- Country: France

Highway system
- Roads in France; Autoroutes; Routes nationales

The A3 Autoroute is a French autoroute located entirely within the department of Seine-Saint-Denis, serving Montreuil, Rosny-sous-Bois, and Bondy. Its southern terminus is an interchange with the Boulevard Périphérique at the Porte de Bagnolet, and its northern terminus is an interchange with the A1 near Aéroport CDG. The A3 is 18 km long, and forms a part of European Route E15. A brief segment of its length is a concurrency with the A86. The first section of the roadway opened in 1969 between the Porte de Bagnolet and Bondy. Following the closure of the A186, one spur route branches off from the A3 - the A103 Autoroute.

The A186 Autoroute was originally planned to connect the A3 with the A86 - however this spur was never completed. It closed in May 2019, and will be converted into an extension of Île-de-France tramway Line 1 by 2024.

== Lists of exits and junctions ==
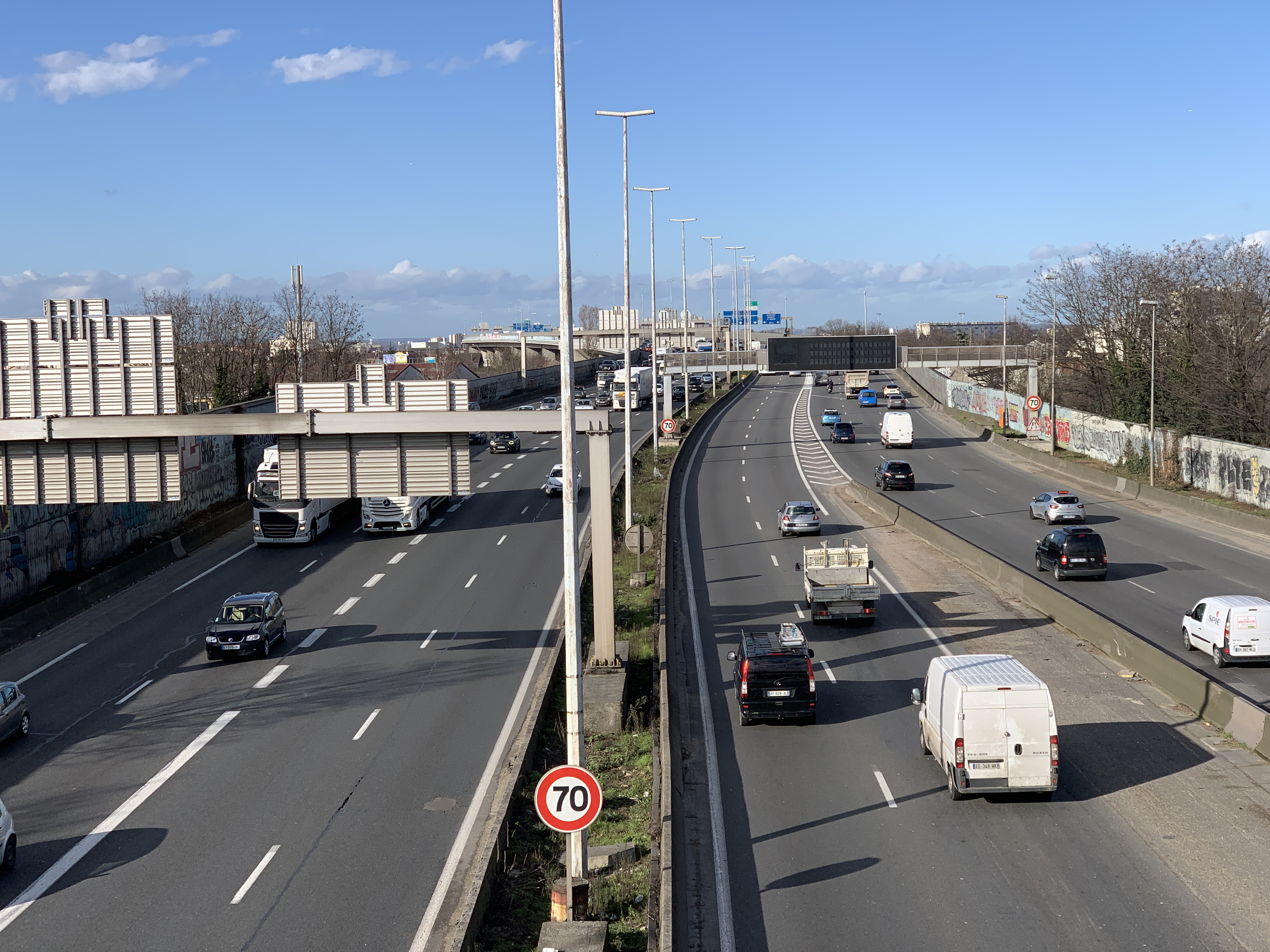
The A3 at Bondy

| Region | Department | km | mi | Junctions | Destinations | Notes |
|---|---|---|---|---|---|---|
| Île-de-France | Paris | 0.0 | 0.0 | Boulevard Périphérique + Porte de Bagnolet | Périphérique Nord : A1 - A15, Porte des Lilas; Périphérique Sud : A4 - A6 ( A10) Orly, Porte de Montreuil | |
| Île-de-France | Paris | 0.0 | 0.0 | Boulevard Périphérique + Porte de Bagnolet | Paris-Porte de Bagnolet, Bagnolet | |
| Île-de-France | Seine-Saint-Denis | 1.4 | 0.8 | 1 : Montreuil | Montreuil - centre, Bagnolet - Z. I. La Noue | Entry and exit only from Paris |
| Île-de-France | Seine-Saint-Denis | 1.7 | 1.05 | 2 : Romainville | Montreuil - Villiers-Barbusse, Montreau-Ruffins Romainville | |
| Île-de-France | Seine-Saint-Denis | Aire de Romainville (Northbound) | | | | |
| Île-de-France | Seine-Saint-Denis | 4.4 | 2.48 | A86 (Eastbound) & A103 - A3 | Noisy-le-Sec, Rosny-sous-Bois, Fontenay-sous-Bois, Créteil (A4), Bordeaux (A10), Montreuil - La Boissière, Centre-Commercial Westfield Rosny 2 | |
| Île-de-France | Seine-Saint-Denis | 4.4 | 2.48 | A86 (Eastbound) & A103 - A3 | Chelles, Le Raincy, Villemomble, Centre-Commercial Westfield Rosny 2 | |
| Île-de-France | Seine-Saint-Denis | A 3 overlaps and becomes E15 / A 3 / A 86 | | | | |
| Île-de-France | Seine-Saint-Denis | 7.0 | 4.3 | A86 (Westbound) - A3 | Saint-Denis, Bobigny, Drancy, A15 | Entry and exit only from Paris |
| Île-de-France | Seine-Saint-Denis | E15 / A 3 / A 86 becomes again E15 / A 3 | | | | |
| Île-de-France | Seine-Saint-Denis | 7.6 | 4.7 | 3 : Bondy - centre | Bondy, Meaux, Livry-Gargan, Les Pavillons-sous-Bois | Entry and exit only from Paris |
| Île-de-France | Seine-Saint-Denis | 8.3 | 5.1 | 3 : Bobigny | Bondy, Meaux, Bobigny, Porte de Pantin, (A86 - A15) | Entry and exit only from Lille |
| Île-de-France | Seine-Saint-Denis | 9.2 | 5.7 | 4 : Bondy - nord | Bondy - La Noue Caillet, Aulnay-sous-Bois - Nonneville | Entry and exit only from Paris |
| Île-de-France | Seine-Saint-Denis | 10.2 | 6.3 | 5 : Aulnay-sous-Bois - centre | Aulnay-sous-Bois, Drancy, Le Blanc-Mesnil - centre | |
| Île-de-France | Seine-Saint-Denis | 12.2 | 7.5 | A1 (Southbound) - A3 | Paris-Porte de la Chapelle (centre), Saint-Denis, Garonor | Entry and exit only from Paris |
| Île-de-France | Seine-Saint-Denis | 12.4 | 7.7 | 6a/6b : Aulnay - Z. I. / Le Blanc-Mesnil - Z. I. | Aulnay-sous-Bois, Le Blanc-Mesnil, Centre-Commercial O'Parinor | |
| Île-de-France | Val d'Oise | 15.4 | 9.5 | A170 & RD 170 - A3 | Z. I. Paris-Nord 2, Parc des expositions de Paris-Nord Villepinte, Villepinte, Soissons | |
| Île-de-France | Val d'Oise | 15.4 | 9.5 | A170 & RD 170 - A3 | Gonesse, Sarcelles | |
| Île-de-France | Val d'Oise | 17.0 | 10.5 | : Charles-de-Gaulle | Roissy-en-France, Ch.de.Gaulle, Louvres, Goussainville, Z. I. Paris-Nord 2, Aéroville | |
| Île-de-France | Val d'Oise | 17.8 | 11.1 | A1 (Northbound) - A3 | Lille, Bruxelles, Senlis, (A15) Cergy-Pontoise, Amiens (A16) | Entry and exit only from A1 (Lille) |
1.000 mi = 1.609 km; 1.000 km = 0.621 mi

== European Routes ==
| European Route | Location |
| E15 | entire length |
