= Avicenne Hospital =

Hospital in Seine-Saint-Denis, Paris, France

Avicenne University Hospital
- AP-HP
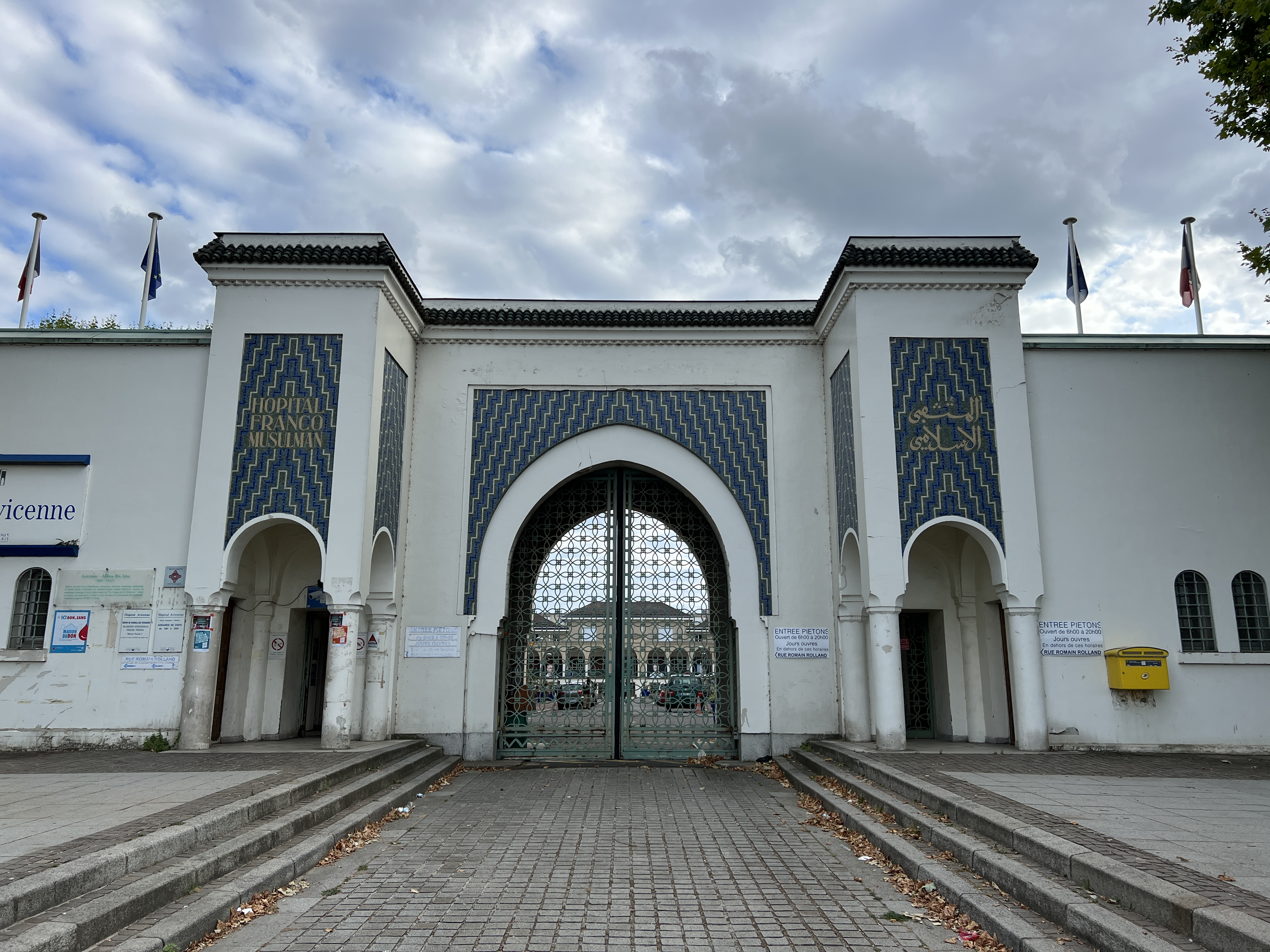

Geography
- Location: Bobigny, Seine-Saint-Denis, Paris, FR-75, France
- Coordinates: 48.9144°N 2.4239°E

Organisation
- Care system: AP-HP
- Type: District General, Teaching
- Religious affiliation: Muslim

Services
- Emergency department: Yes

History
- Opened: 1935

Links
- Website: https://chu93.aphp.fr
- Lists: Hospitals in France

Avicenne Hospital (French: Hôpital Avicenne) is Muslim community founded district general hospital in Bobigny, Seine-Saint-Denis, in the northern suburbs of Paris. Opened in 1935 as the Franco-Muslim Hospital (Hôpital franco-musulman de Paris), it was built specifically to cater for North-African immigrants who had flocked to the Paris area. Renamed Avicenne in 1978, in memory of the Persian physician Avicenna, it is now a university hospital catering for the local population.
