= Collégien =

- Commune
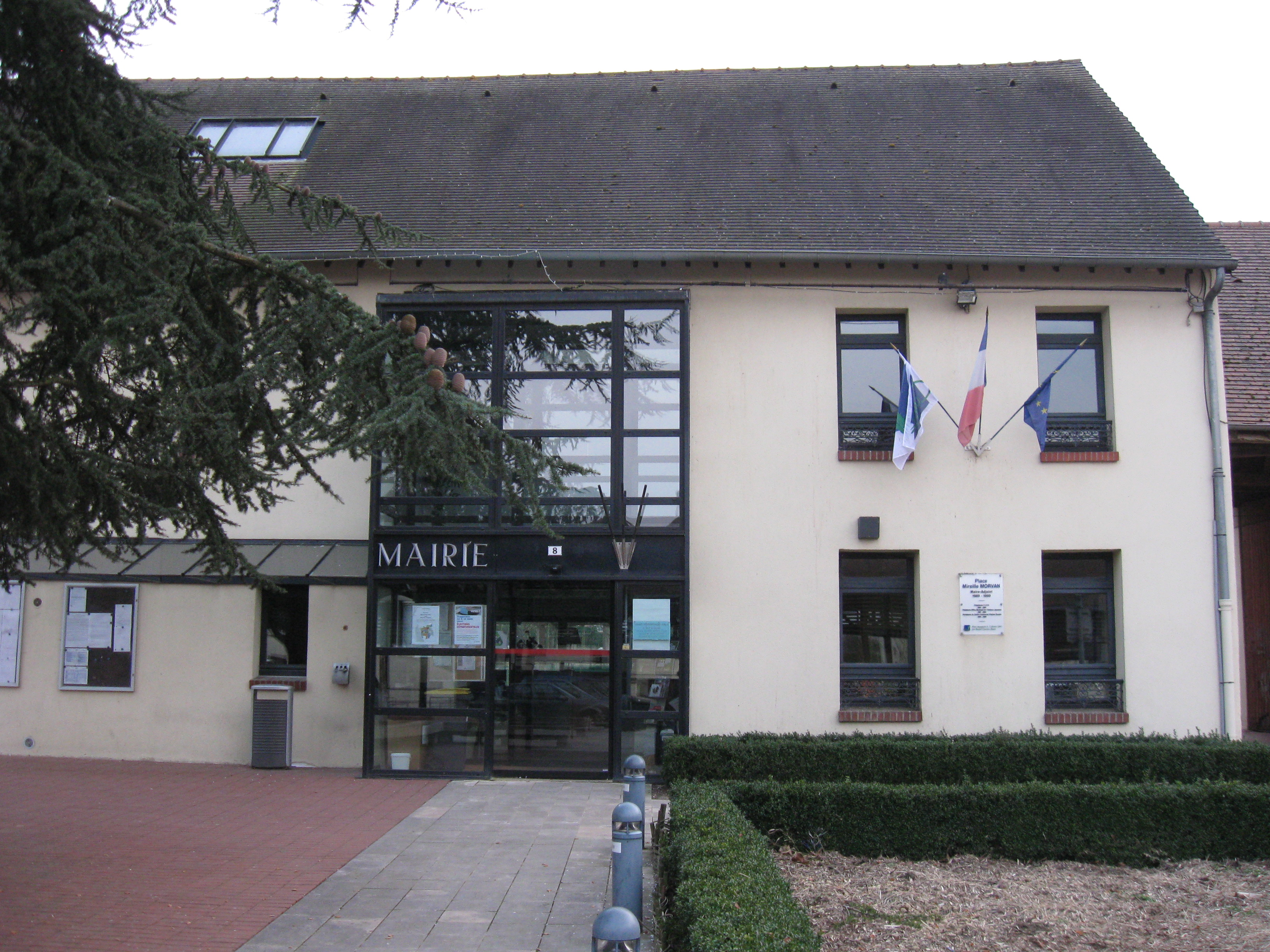
- The town hall in Collégien
- Location of Collégien
- Location within France Location within Île-de-France (region)
- Coordinates: 48°50′16″N 2°40′27″E
- Country: France
- Region: Île-de-France
- Department: Seine-et-Marne
- Arrondissement: Torcy
- Canton: Torcy
- Intercommunality: CA Marne et Gondoire

Government
  - Mayor (2020–2026): Marc Pinoteau
- Area^{1}: 4.27 km^{2} (1.65 sq mi)
- Highest elevation: 116 m (381 ft)
- Lowest elevation: 82 m (269 ft)
- Population (2023): 3,354
  - Density: 785/km^{2} (2,030/sq mi)
- Time zone: UTC+01:00 (CET)
  - Summer (DST): UTC+02:00 (CEST)
- INSEE/Postal code: 77121 /77090
- ^{1} French Land Register data, which excludes lakes, ponds, glaciers > 1 km^{2} (0.386 sq mi or 247 acres) and river estuaries.

Collégien (French pronunciation: [kɔleʒjɛ̃]) is a commune in the Seine-et-Marne department in the Île-de-France region in north-central France.

== Population ==
Historical population
Year	Pop.	±% p.a.
1968	264	—
1975	281	+0.90%
1982	818	+16.49%
1990	2,331	+13.99%
1999	2,983	+2.78%
2007	3,149	+0.68%
2012	3,150	+0.01%
2017	3,400	+1.54%
2023	3,354	−0.23%
Source: INSEE

The inhabitants are called Collégeois in French.

== Education ==
There is one primary school group containing preschool and elementary school, Les écoles des Saules. Collège Victor Schœlcher, a junior high school in Torcy; and Lycée Jean-Moulin, a senior high school/sixth-form college in Torcy, serve the community.

== See also ==
- Communes of the Seine-et-Marne department
