= Épiais-lès-Louvres =

- Commune
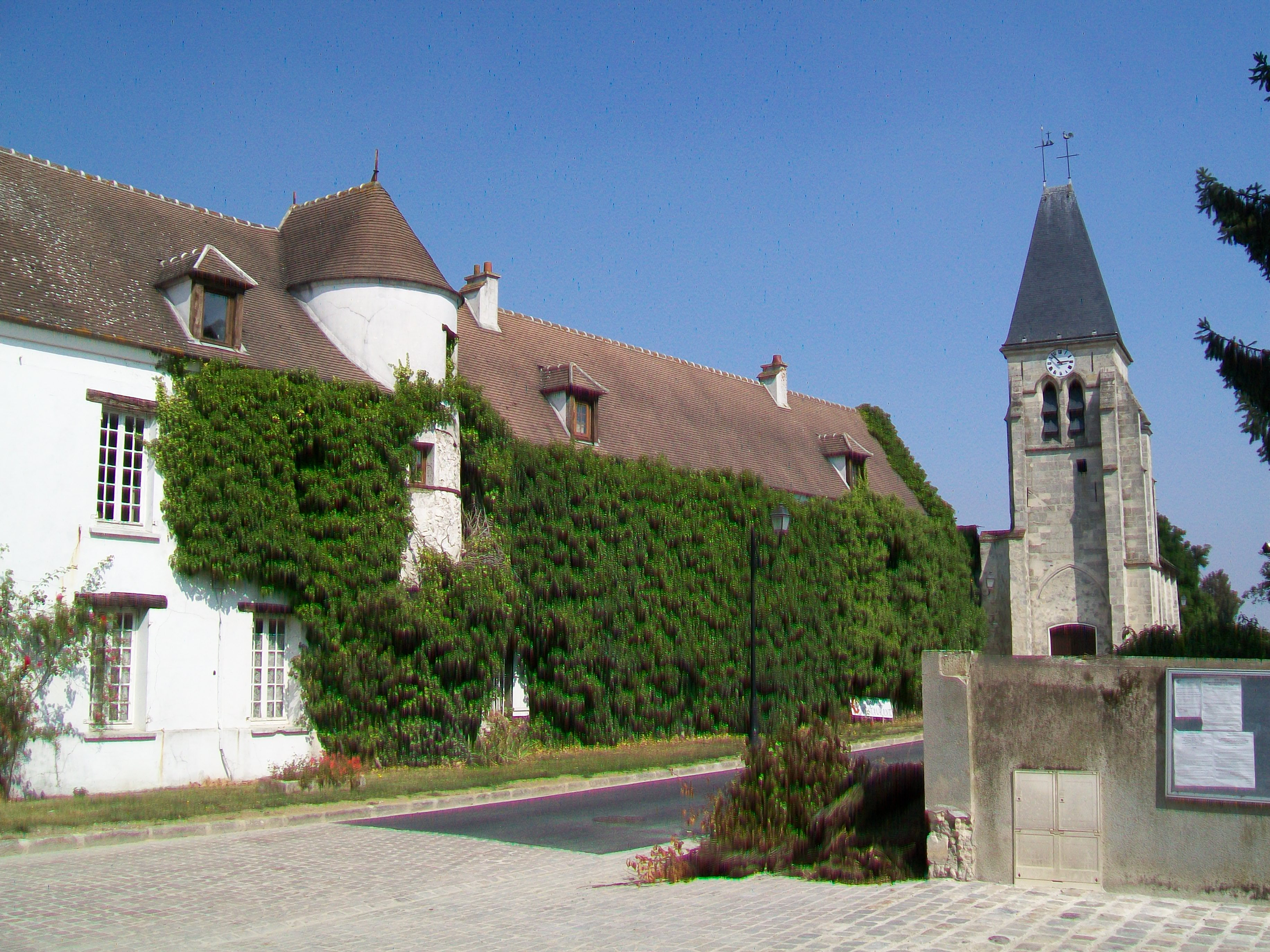
- Manor and Our Lady of the Assumption's Church

- Coat of arms
- Location of Épiais-lès-Louvres
- Location within France Location within Île-de-France (region)
- Coordinates: 49°01′56″N 2°33′30″E
- Country: France
- Region: Île-de-France
- Department: Val-d'Oise
- Arrondissement: Sarcelles
- Canton: Goussainville
- Intercommunality: CA Roissy Pays de France

Government
  - Mayor (2020–2026): Isabelle Rusin
- Area^{1}: 3.42 km^{2} (1.32 sq mi)
- Population (2023): 156
  - Density: 45.6/km^{2} (118/sq mi)
- Time zone: UTC+01:00 (CET)
  - Summer (DST): UTC+02:00 (CEST)
- INSEE/Postal code: 95212 /95380
- ^{1} French Land Register data, which excludes lakes, ponds, glaciers > 1 km^{2} (0.386 sq mi or 247 acres) and river estuaries.

Épiais-lès-Louvres (French pronunciation: [epjɛ lɛ luvʁ], literally Épiais near Louvres) is a commune in the Val-d'Oise department in Île-de-France in northern France.

== Education ==
As of 2014 some preschool and elementary-aged students attend school in Roissy-en-France while others attend school in Louvres.

== See also ==
- Communes of the Val-d'Oise department
