= Vaulerent barn =

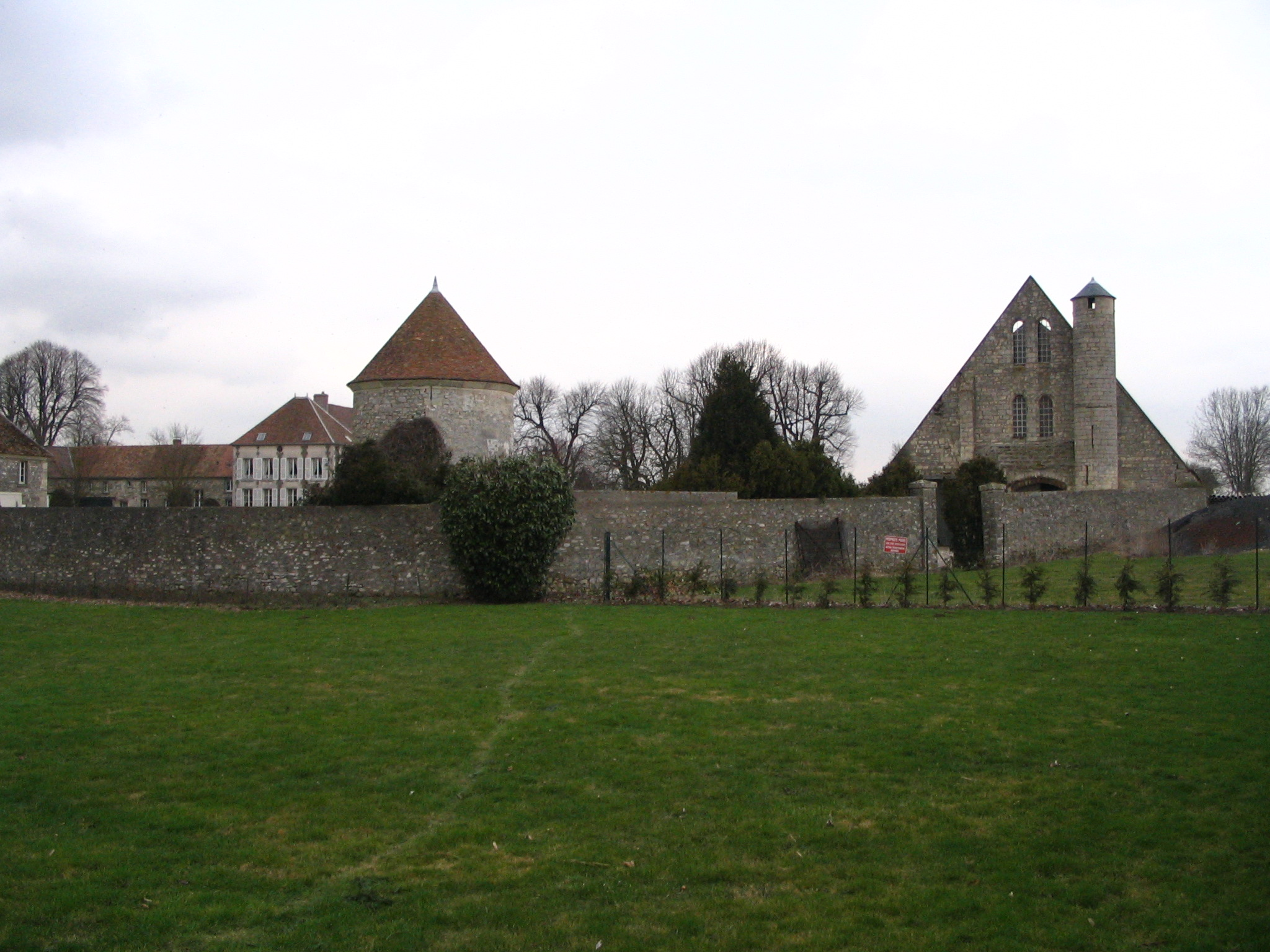
- The barn, its dovecote and part of the main building.
- Interactive map of the Vaulerent barn area

General information
- Architectural style: Medieval
- Location: France, Île-de-France, Val-d'Oise, Villeron
- Construction started: 1220
- Construction stopped: 1230

The Vaulerent or Vaulerand barn is a former monastic barn in Villeron, on the French plain in eastern Val-d'Oise.

From the 11th century onwards, it was a farm belonging to the Chaalis Abbey. Almost 800 years later, the barn still serves this agricultural function. Operated directly by the Royal Cistercian Abbey and its lay monks until 1315, it was then leased out. It remained the property of the royal abbey until 1791 when it was sold as biens nationaux.

The current complex includes a storage building, the barn, which dates back to the 13th century. Measuring 72 meters in length, it is one of the most imposing Cistercian farm buildings in France. The barn was listed as a historic monument in 1889; the dovecote, the well and the cellars were listed as historic monuments on February 20, 1990.

== Location and topography ==
The Domaine de Vaulerent is situated on a broad plateau in the northeastern part of the Pays de France, rising to a height of around one hundred meters. It is bordered to the northeast by the Butte de Montmélian in the commune of Saint-Witz, which marks the beginning of the Valois region, and to the south by the upper Croult valley in the communes of Louvres and Chennevières-lès-Louvres, which forms only a small, shallow valley in which the stream flows only intermittently. The subsoil of the plateau is composed of Saint-Ouen limestone (Bartonian), covered by a thick layer of plateau silts. This is the source of the land's remarkable agricultural qualities. On average, it reaches a thickness of 3 meters but can reach up to 6 meters, as shown by test pits carried out at Roissy-en-France, a little further south.

Like all the cereal barns in the Chaalis area, Vaulerent is isolated from any built-up area, in the middle of an open-field system. The center of the village of Villeron is 800 meters away. Around 1 kilometer to the west runs the ancient Roman road, then the royal road between Paris and Senlis, which later became Route nationale 17. The Chaalis Abbey is 15 kilometers to the northeast of the barn, a distance of around 20 kilometers by road in the Middle Ages. Today, urbanization is progressing all around the estate, with the presence of Paris-Charles-de-Gaulle airport 3 kilometers to the south, the development of housing estates around the village of Villeron, and a business park close to the old Route Nationale.

== Toponymy ==
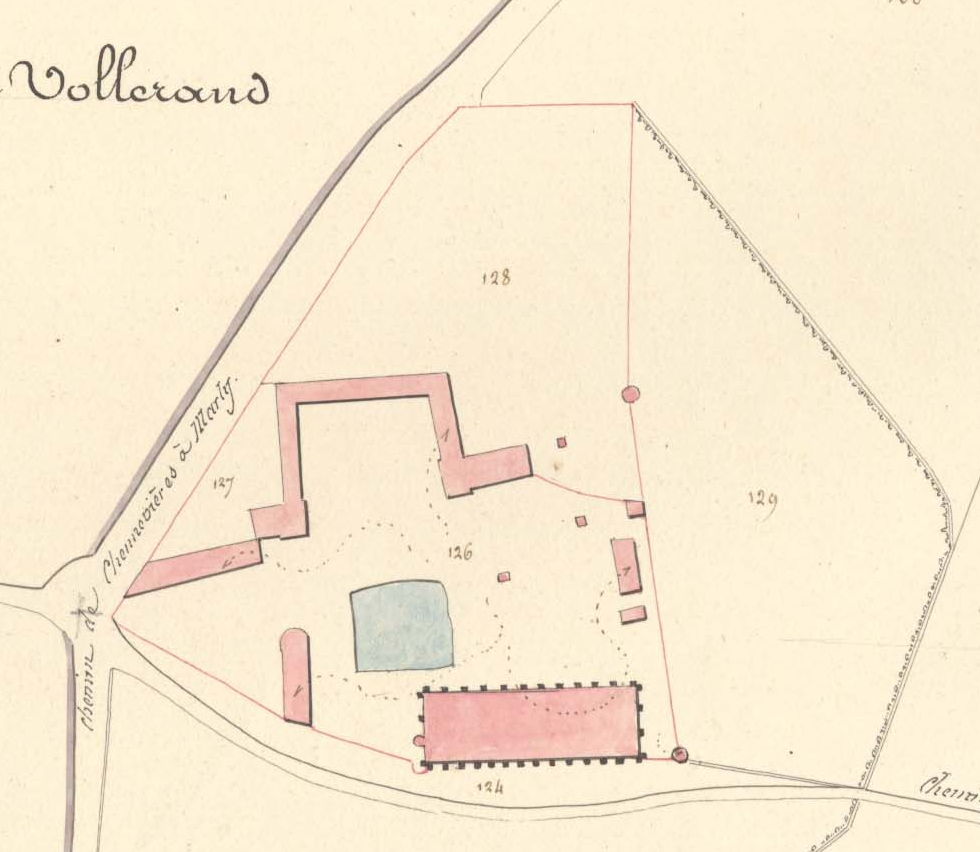
Barn buildings in the 1823 land register.

The name Vaulerent comes from the Latin Vallis Laurentii, meaning "Laurent's valley". The spelling of the name has constantly evolved: Vallorens, Vaulaurent, Volleron. Today, the spelling varies between Vaulerand, Vollerand, Vaulerant, and Vaulerent. Researchers prefer this last spelling, as it is the closest to the etymology and phonetic evolution.

== History ==
At the beginning of the 13th century, the Chaalis Abbey owned eleven barns, three of which were located on the French plain: the Stains barn in the present-day commune of Villeneuve-sous-Dammartin (Seine-et-Marne), the Choisy-aux-Bœufs barn in Vémars (Val-d'Oise), and the largest of all, the Vaulerent barn.

=== The creation of the estate ===
The estate's history is well documented in the original abbey documents held at the Archives Départementales de l'Oise in Beauvais and the abbey's cartulary kept at the Bibliothèque Nationale de France.

The land of Vaulerent has belonged to the Chaalis abbey since it was founded in 1136. A charter dated 1138 specifies that it was bought half by King Louis VI and half by the monks. These lands had previously belonged to the lords of Villeron and the Suger de Chennevières family. At the time, these territories were largely occupied by woods and uncultivated land. After the first royal donation, other gifts came from local lords: Barthélemy de Montgé gave 37 arpents in 1139, Guillaume de Goussainville gave 20 arpents in 1140, Gautier d'Aulnay gave a nearby wood around 1143, which the Cistercian monks obtained the right to clear and cultivate.

Between 1140 and 1145, small buildings were erected on the site, and new donations were made. These lands were located in the parishes of Villeron, Saint-Witz, and Épiais. An isolated piece of land was also donated in Goussainville. The donations were made at a time when Bernard of Clairvaux was extending the influence of the Cistercians, thanks in particular to his preaching on the Second Crusade. In 1160, 140 arpents (61 hectares) were donated by Gui de Senlis, a butler of the King.

From 1163 onwards, the monks began to purchase new land around their estate, often disguised as donations. These purchases, made from local lords or other ecclesiastical establishments, enabled the estate to expand, but also to reduce the number of landlocked plots. This expansion came to a halt in 1173. It resumed only sporadically until around 1212, with purchases from small lords in economic difficulty. Around 87 plots were bought up until 1248. The surface area of only 52 of these is known: they cover 631 arpents or 275 hectares. The total surface area in 1248 is estimated, using a document called État général des terres de Vaulerent, at between 320 and 380 hectares. It covers a single block of land 4.5 kilometers long from north to south and no more than 1.5 kilometers wide, located between the parishes of Survilliers, Louvres, Roissy, and Épiais.

=== Barn farming in the Middle Ages ===
==== Direct use by monks (11th and 13th centuries) ====
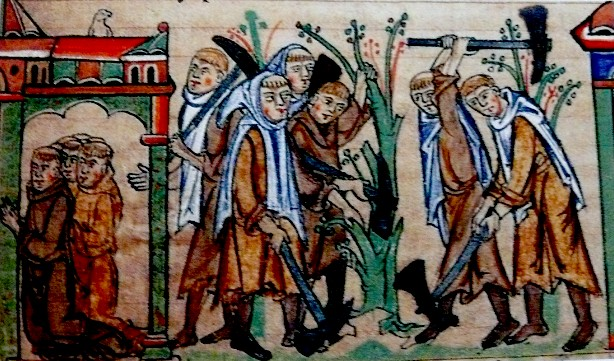
Illumination depicts monks working in the fields. Manuscript from Cambridge University Library, late 13th century.

When the monks acquired this land, none of it was under the tenancy. Instead, they were farmed directly by the abbey's lay monks. As required by the order's statutes in 1134, these lands were less than a day's walk from the mother abbey. All the modern agricultural methods of the time were employed. Horses were used as draft animals, rather than oxen, and land was cleared and improved. The monks developed a strict three-field system for all their plots, resulting in very high yields per hectare for the time. The first soles were devoted to wheat, the second to fallow land and the third to spring cereals, mainly barley. Archival documents from the 13th century are sufficiently precise to determine which plots were in which soles and in which year. This system lasted until the 18th century. In addition, the monks carried out extensive land consolidation. Of the 87 parcels listed in the acquisitions, the 1248 État Général mentions only 31 in total, a reduction of almost two-thirds. Of these parcels, nine were between 50 and 100 arpents, or between 22 and 45 hectares each, occupying over 90% of the estate.

==== Farming the barn (14th and 15th centuries) ====
At the beginning of the 14th century, the Parisis region was undergoing a serious agricultural crisis due to poor weather conditions, resulting in famine and a sharp rise in mortality. This crisis was compounded by difficulties in recruiting new lay monks to keep the farms running. According to Charles Higounet, these problems led to the decision in November 1315 to lease a part of the land to a certain Pierre Bove, living in Vémars, for nine years, with the buildings attached. According to Georges Duby, the agricultural crisis needs to be put into perspective, and this decision is more closely linked to a general trend at this time, among ecclesiastical and seigniorial farms, to cease direct exploitation and favor leasing.

According to the inventory of 1315, the farm included 13 mares, 6 cows, 12 pigs, and 500 sheep. Since the rent was set at 1,123.80 hectolitres of wheat, the minimum yield required to break even and pay the rent was 15 hectolitres per hectare or 12.5 quintals. According to Higounet, the yield per hectare should have been over 16 quintals in the best years. The farm also grew dye woad and a small amount of vigne.

The barn continued to be subdivided throughout the 14th century, and its direct tenancy was completely abandoned. According to the 1401 "aveu et dénombrement", the monastic estate reached 453 hectares but was divided into seven fragments operated in different ways. In 1375, a new barn was leased to the north of the estate, on the land of Le Guépelle (now part of the commune of Saint-Witz), covering an area of 79 hectares. Other farms were created to the south of the estate, in Goussainville, Louvres, and Épiais. In addition, part of the Louvres' land was leased to tenants in the form of taxes. Some of these lands remained the property of Chaalis, but no longer depended on Vaulerent. The barn was reported in ruins in 1446, having lost its framework as a result of local fighting during the Hundred Years' War. It was undoubtedly restored in the years that followed. Its farm, created in 1315, covers between 194 and 227 ha.

=== Farming in modern times ===
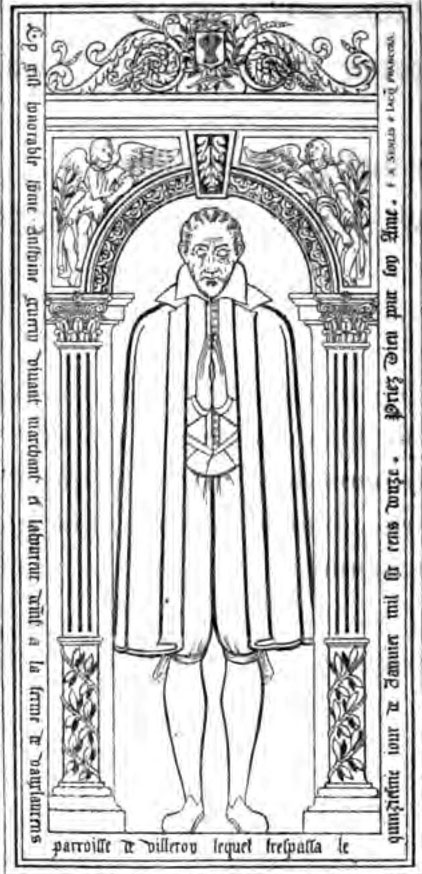
Tombstone of Anthoine Guérin, a Vaulerent ploughman who died in 1612.

The farm at the center of the monastery estate was first recorded in the farm archives in 1537. At that date, it covered 234 hectares and was divided into three families, Jean, Claude, and Jeanne Bruslé, with holdings of 75 to 80 hectares each. At the turn of the 16th and 17th centuries, the division of the estate was reduced to two. In 1649, Adam Le Febvre finally reunited the entire farm. Despite these successions of the same family on the farm, the situation remained precarious for each farmer, as their lease had to be renewed at the same rate of nine years, i.e. the rate of three crop rotations, as had been the case since 1315. This renewal was often accompanied by the payment of bribes, necessary to keep the lease: Noël Le Maire paid 500 pounds in 1630. The farm remained the property of the Chaalis abbey and its commendatory abbot until the French Revolution. Every year, the farmers had to bring the amount of their rent in kind to the parent abbey by cart convoy. They were obliged to reserve a room "ready and well furnished" for the abbot's officers and servants so that they could check on the state of the area.

Despite this precarious situation, the family managed to accumulate enough income to own land on other estates. In 1639, Françoise Ganneron, widow of Guillaume Le Maire, owned 88 hectares of land, to which were added 51 hectares bequeathed to her children. The marked honorability of these farmers is reflected in their burials: the Bruslé family was one of the first to obtain the privilege of being buried directly in the parish church. The church of Saint-Germain de Villeron still houses a number of their tombstones, including that of Jehan Bruslé, dating from 1561, that of Anthoine Guérin, who died in 1612 and is depicted full-length on his slab, and that of his wife.

At the end of the reign of Louis XIV, the economic crisis that devastated the kingdom also affected the wealthy farmers of Vaulerent. Land yields fell sharply, due in part to poor weather conditions linked to the peak of the Little Ice Age. Farmers were unable to sustain ever-increasing rents. In 1696, Louis Le Febvre's last lease ended, and the property was taken over by the family of Jean Navarre, who were settled in the Villeroy region, near Meaux. In 1708, he combined Vaulerent with the neighboring farm of Choisy-aux-Bœufs and the seigneurial farm of Villeron, the other large farm in the parish, giving him a total of 658 hectares and 18,600 pounds in rent. He owned 39 plough horses, a thousand sheep, and 17 carters.

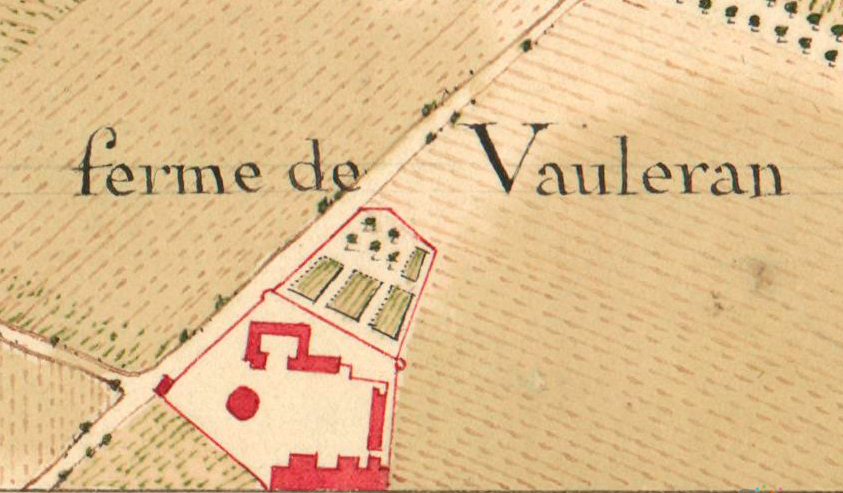
Plan of the farm as depicted in Atlas de Trudaine, between 1745 and 1780.

Even during the most severe crises, the Vaulerent farm remained one of the most productive, thanks to some of the most fertile land in the region. In 1677, the farm yielded 26 hectoliters of wheat per hectare, and in 1702, 22.4 hectoliters per hectare. These were among the highest yields in the Pays de France during the entire period. As a result, the rent set for the farm was also the highest in the entire region: 6,000 pounds in 1682, and 7,000 in 1698, which, about the farm's surface area, represented 13 pounds per cultivated hectare. In 1741, Claude Prévost, a new farmer from Villepinte who had succeeded Vaulerent to the Navarre family in 1731, was the biggest taxpayer in the whole Île-de-France election, with a taille tax of 3,640 pounds; this was still the case in 1758, with a tax of 3,200 pounds.

In 1758, according to the post-death inventory of Prévost's wife, the farm covered 220 hectares and cost 7,900 pounds in cash, 98 hectoliters of oats, and 367 quintals of sheaves of straw. Every year, 85 hectares were devoted to wheat, including 81 hectares of wheat, 3.5 hectares of rye, and 0.5 hectares of meslin, representing more than a third of the land. 52 hectares were devoted to spring cereals (notably oats and legumes), 74 hectares to fallow, and 11 hectares to hay. A large quantity of this wheat was stored on site, with 600 quintals, half of which remains to be threshed. The farmer also owned 16 draught horses (forming 6 teams for seven plows), 316 sheep, 27 cows, and 400 poultry. The farmer's house contained 7 rooms, a wealth of furniture, 260 pounds of jewelry, and 7,000 pounds of cash. In 1761, Prévost's daughter married Pierre Mangin, who became the new farmer.

=== Contemporary developments ===
In January 1791, the 234-hectare farm was sold as biens nationaux. Louis-Michel Lepeletier de Saint-Fargeau, from a wealthy noblesse de robe family and a well-known revolutionary, bought the land. At the same time, he bought another Chaalis barn for sale, Choisy-aux-Bœufs, as well as a farm in Longperrier, making a total of 643 hectares of some of the finest land in the Île-de-France region, for 1,312,000 pounds. After his assassination two years later, the estate remained in the hands of his daughter, Suzanne Le Peletier de Mortefontaine, until 1829. Three years later, through inheritance, it became the property of Viscountess Marie-Louise Talleyrand de Périgord. In August 1841, she sold the estate to Marie Louise Pelline von Dalberg in exchange for a private mansion in Paris, plus a payment of 120,000 francs. The property then passed into the hands of Adèle Narcisse Defontaine, Comtesse de Rigny, wife of Henri de Rigny, then Élise Honnorez, Duchesse Arrighi de Casanova, wife of Ernest Arrighi de Casanova, and finally to her daughter, Duchesse Marie-Adèle-Henriette Riquet de Caraman, wife of Georges-Ernest-Maurice de Riquet de Caraman. The latter granted a lease to a farmer named Albert Lecerf in 1890.

In 1889, the barn was listed as a historic monument, the first agricultural barn to be protected in France.

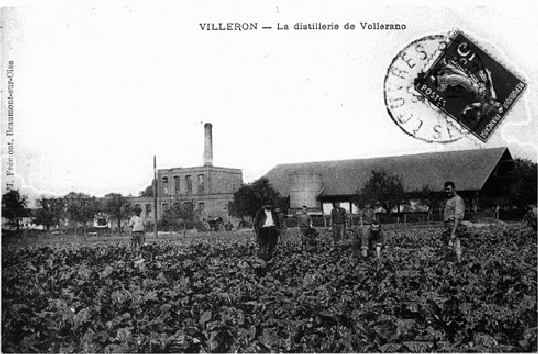
The Vaulerent Distillery some time after its construction.

In 1903, Laurent Lecerf and his son Émile built a distillery at the entrance to the farm, complete with beet sheds and storage channels. It produced ethyl alcohol and pulp for cattle feed. Beet has been grown regularly on the farm since the last third of the 19th century. All surplus production is sent to the Villeron sugar factory, located since 1866 to the northeast of the estate, on the Senlis road. The distillery, one of the last in operation in the Pays de France, ceased trading in 1975. In 1922, Émile Lecerf acquired all the land, which until then had been leased mainly from the Comte de Caraman. Around 600 years later, 214 hectares were returned to direct tenancy. The farm quickly modernized, acquiring a tractor during the First World War and three more before the Second.

The dovecote, cellars, and well were listed as historic monuments by decree on February 20, 1990. A few years later, the dovecote was restored. The site is a member of the European Charter of Cistercian Abbeys and Sites.

Jean Lecerf's descendants, now Plasmans, still own the farm. The farm now covers some 500 hectares in Villeron, Vémars, and Chennevières-lès-Louvres. It has diversified into onion and potato production. On average, it produces 2,000 tons of wheat, 14,000 tons of beet, and 5,000 tons of potatoes. The latter are processed in the on-site packaging plant, which has a capacity of 120 tons per day and employs a total of around twenty people. It markets the potatoes under the "Primanord" brand.

== Description ==
The entire farm site is surrounded by a stone wall, probably built in the 14th century and reinforced by two 15th-century pepperpot towers. This small fortification is probably explained by the unrest in the region during the Hundred Years' War. The wall included an extension to the north and east, still visible on the land register at the beginning of the 19th century, enclosing a former orchard and vegetable garden. This extension has now been leveled and the kitchen garden turned into an agricultural field. The interior is entered through a single door opening onto a paved path. Within the enclosure is a paved courtyard, with a large pond at its center.

=== Cereal barn ===
==== Building description ====
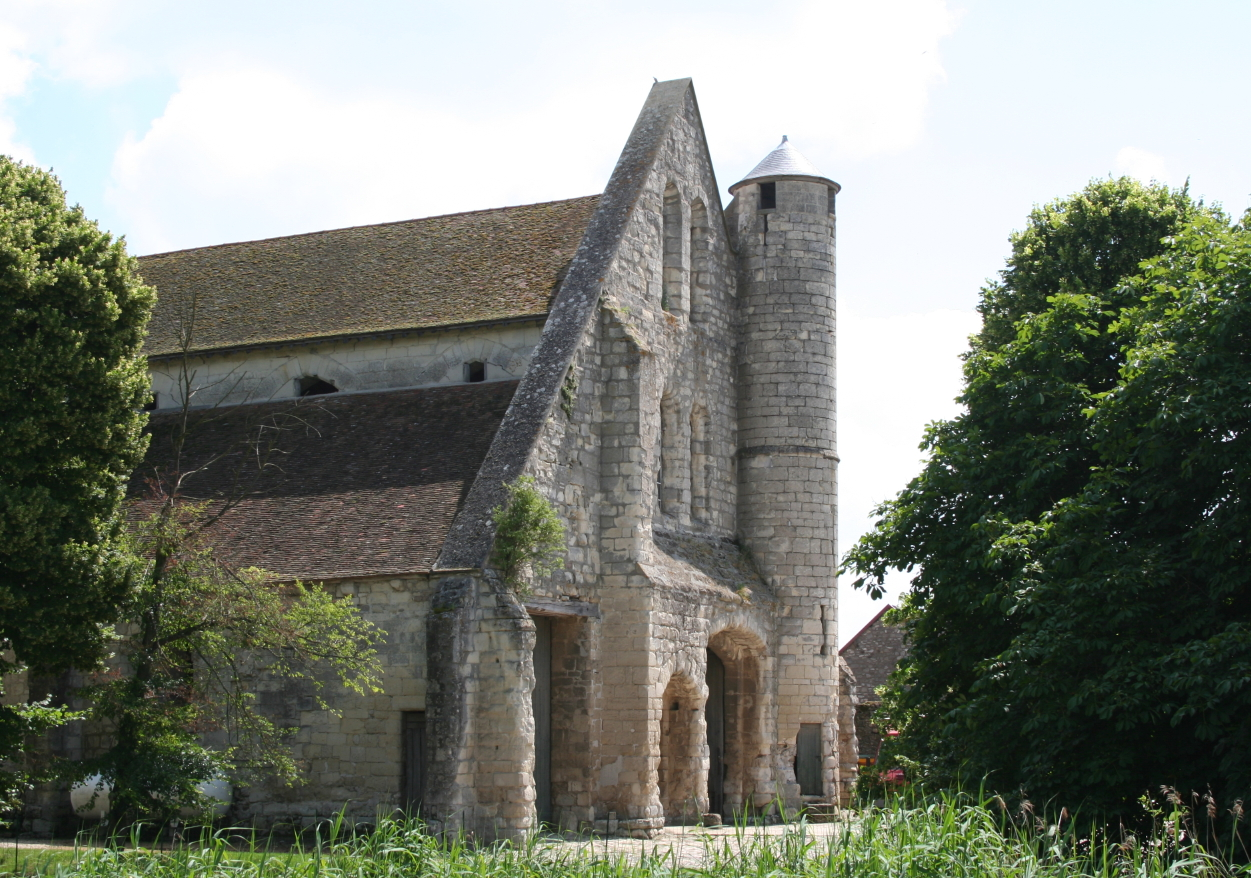
Southwest gable wall of the barn with its watch turret.

Measuring 72 meters long and 23 meters wide, the cereal barn is the largest of all Chaalis Abbey's outbuildings. It has a floor surface area of 1,656 square meters. It is built entirely of regular Saint-Ouen limestone, the local stone. The building features two rows of arches dividing the space into three 13-bay vessels. Buttresses reinforce the building on all four sides.

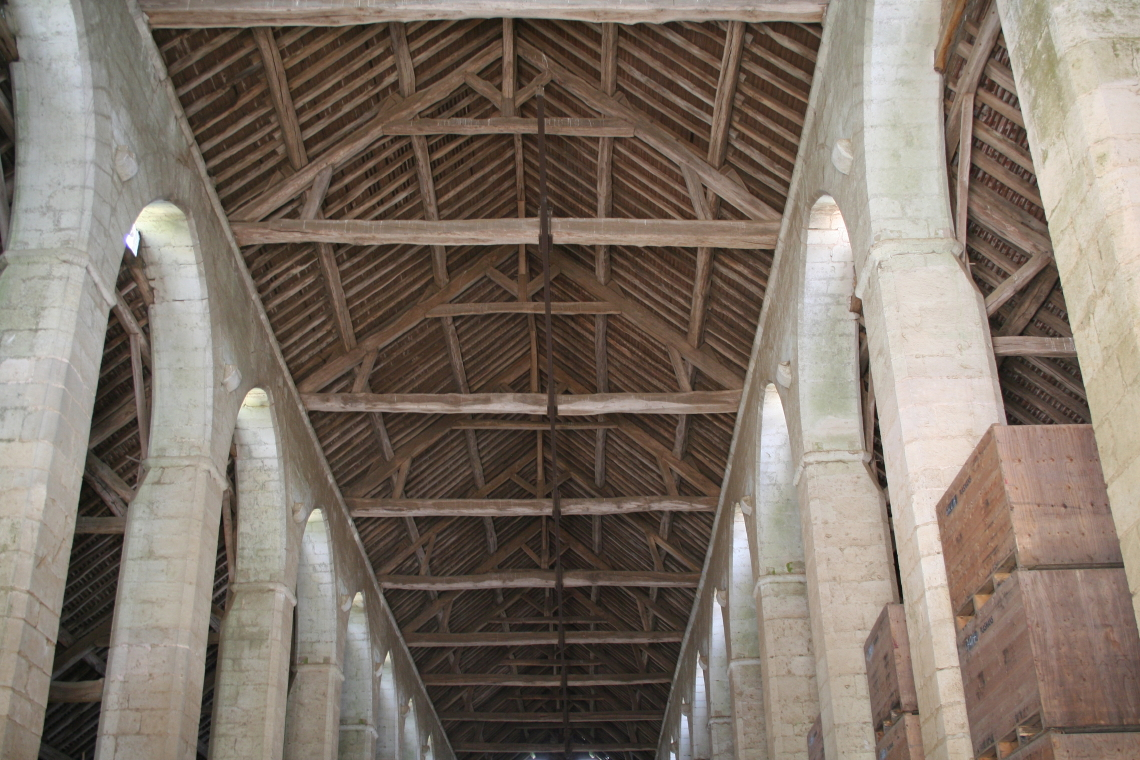
View of the frame and pillars inside the barn.

The southwest gable wall rises to 20.60 meters and supports an ashlar turret of the same height. The turret features a spiral staircase leading to an exterior door on the first floor and an interior door 6 meters high, opening onto the void, which indicates that a second floor existed above the main door but has disappeared. At the top, the turret's staircase leads to a small observation room, from which three small windows provide a view of the surrounding area. Such a turret does not exist, or has disappeared, on any of the other barns at Chaalis but it still exists on the one at Maubuisson Abbey. According to François Blary, it was added in the 14th century, when the estate was fortified.

There are two doors in the center of the gable, one for pedestrians and one for carters. Above them are two levels of paired windows. A small opening on the right dates from the late Middle Ages, while the large opening on the left, topped by a wooden lintel, dates from the 17th or 18th century.

The northeast gable wall, reinforced by three buttresses, was blind until the addition of a door topped by a wooden lintel in the late modern era. The eaves walls were also originally blind, supported by buttresses, some of which are now partly ruined or have disappeared altogether. At the top, corbels support the roof above. The roof structure rests on a series of central arches and gutter walls. Each slope is covered with flat tiles. This roof, which is not original as can be seen from the windows protruding from the gable end, was probably rebuilt after 1446, the date on which a text describes the ruined barn. Originally, the barn would have had a simple gable roof with two long sides.

Inside, the series of arches is supported by twelve square-based pillars with canted corners, each measuring one meter on a side. The arches are pointed in tiers-point and rise to a height of 13 meters. At the top of each pillar and in the aisles, there are still unused corbels that support the old framework. The floor is now covered with concrete. The building is still used as a storage and agricultural shed.

==== Storage capacity and dating ====
In the absence of archaeological excavations, it is difficult to date the construction of the entire building. According to Charles Higounet, its period of construction can be determined by its storage capacity. The interior volume is between 6,000 and 7,000 cubic meters, which would have accommodated the year's two grain harvests. Such production was achieved in the first decade of the 13th century. The construction of a building of this volume having become indispensable; the barn was probably built in the 1220s or 1230s.

However, this analysis is disputed by Jean-René Trochet. According to him, it's not possible to calculate the amount of hay that could be stored in this type of building. Such a barn can be used as a storage area for grain and sheaves, as well as for vehicles and accessories. Its size can simply be explained by its ostentatious function. The change in the roof structure can be explained by an adaptation to the new constraints of late medieval farming.

=== Other buildings on the present-day farm ===
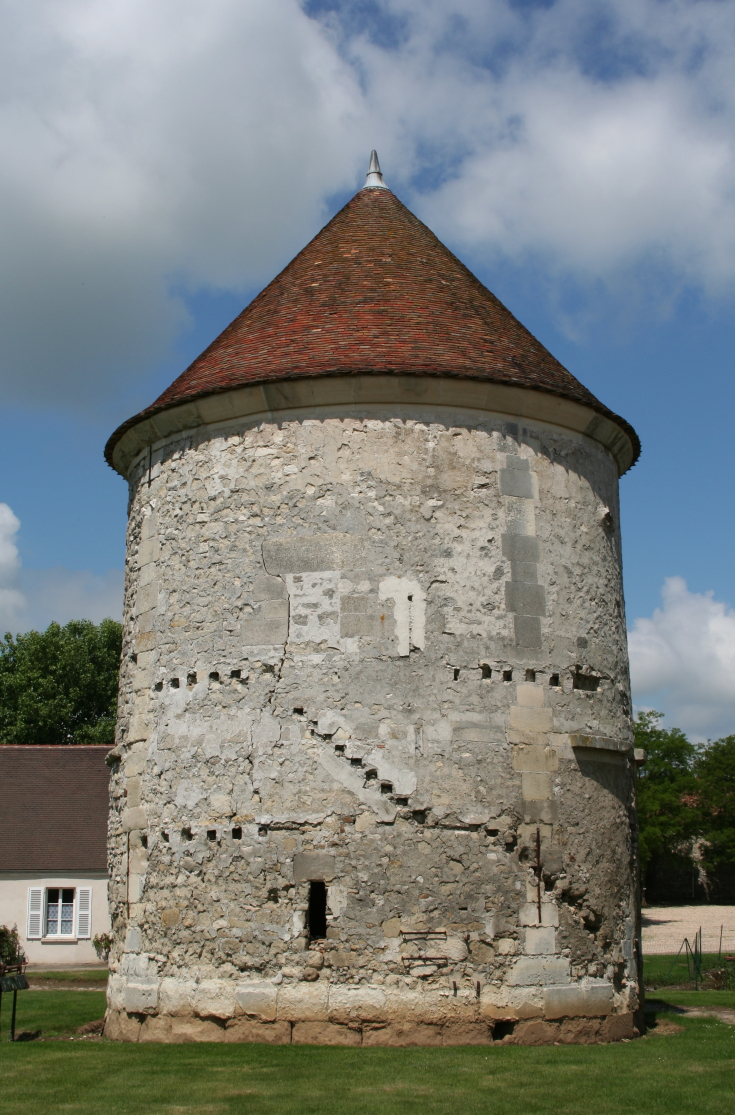
Farmhouse dovecote, 16th and 17th centuries.

The overall shape of the buildings is that of a "U" formed by the buildings opposite the barn, on the other side of the courtyard. In the center, a circular dovecote, six meters in diameter, dominates. It dates from the 16th and 17th centuries. There's also a well with a conical roof and rolled-up eaves. At the entrance are the former tenant dwellings.

The current main building dates back to the 18th or 19th century, and was transformed at the beginning of the 20th century with the addition of a second floor. The basement includes a 4 meters-deep cellar measuring 7.40 meters by 6 meters. Rectangular in shape, it is cross-vaulted and rests on a central capital and a 60 centimeters-diameter column. François Blary estimates its construction date at around 1200. A second cellar, 5.75 meters below the first, was discovered by chance during construction work in 1969. Smaller, it was barrel-vaulted, but its access was quickly blocked by the poor condition of its walls. It probably dates from the 11th century. The access staircase between the two cellars, also now blocked, was 2.60 meters long and barrel-vaulted. At the same time, the main building directly above would have occupied the same floor space as the cellars but disappeared during the Hundred Years' War.

At the entrance to the farm is the old brick distillery, with an industrial chimney and surrounded by storage sheds. Built in the early 20th century, it was converted in 1946. It now serves as the farm's administrative office.

== Culture ==
The barn remains relatively unknown, as the building cannot be visited. Only the nearby Archéa Archaeological Museum, which presents a model of the building in its medieval state, offers guided tours on an occasional basis. Nevertheless, the barn has left its mark on both local popular culture and historiography.

=== The barn in popular culture ===
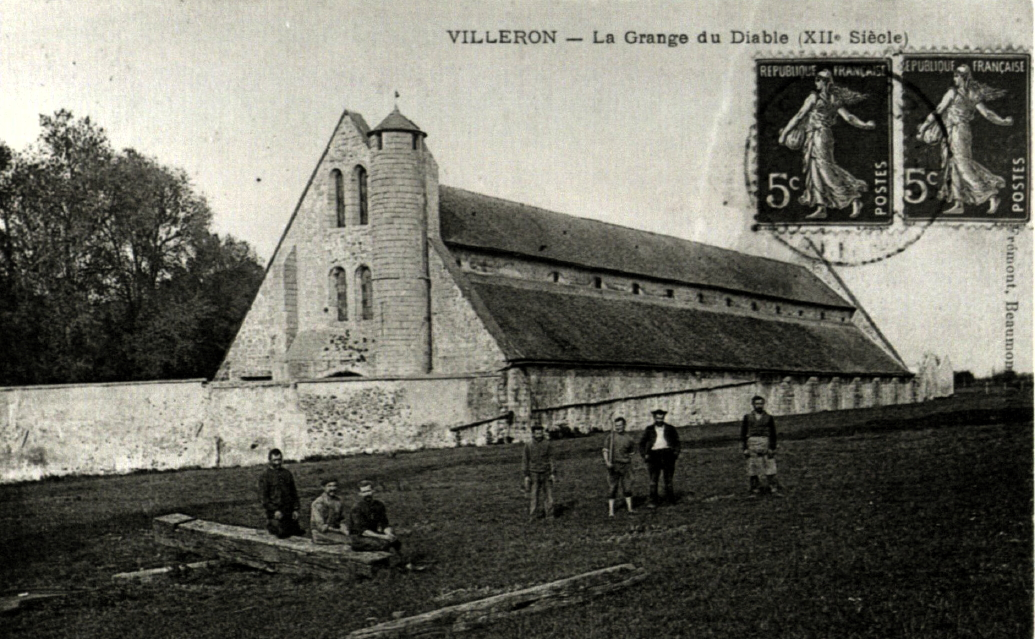
The "devil's barn", according to this turn-of-the-century postcard.

Oral tradition refers to the medieval storage building as the "Devil's Barn". This name comes from a local legend about it: one year, the farmer of Vaulerent had such an abundant harvest that he didn't have enough to protect it, as he hadn't finished covering the barn. He made a deal with the devil: he promised to give him his daughter in exchange for completing the barn roof before the end of the night marked by the crowing of the rooster. As the work progressed rapidly through the night, the farmer's wife, fearing for her daughter, went to the henhouse to wake the rooster, who crowed before daybreak. As the roof was not completed, the pact with the devil was broken.

This legend dates back to at least the early 18th century. At that time, it turns out that a fragment of the barn's roof was not covered. Indeed, Abbé Lebeuf, in his Histoire du diocèse de Paris (1745): "[In Vaulaurent], people have invented fables about the quarré of the barn roof, which remains unfinished and exposes the underside to the insults of the air: but connoisseurs know the physical reason for leaving this quarry near the door uncovered and without tiles; namely, to counter the wind which, blowing impetuously through the large door, harms the sheaf heap". This hole in the roof has since disappeared.

The plot of this tale can be found in other Monastic barns, probably because of their imposing size, to the point of giving them a mythical or superhuman origin. This is the recurring theme of the "duped devil" who is asked to construct a building (bridge or castle), as listed in the Aarne-Thompson classification (AT1005). This standard tale can be found almost everywhere in France.

The barn was used as a film location for the TV movie Le Chevalier de Maison-Rouge, broadcast in 1963.

=== The barn in historiography ===
Charles Higounet's work on Vaulerent is recognized as a pioneering study of agriculture in the Middle Ages. It provided a better understanding of how the three-year crop rotation system was established at that time. The study and the farm are cited in several medieval rural studies, such as Georges Duby and Armand Wallon's Histoire de la France rurale. Some historians, notably in the USA, have even referred to it as Europe's largest grain farm in the Middle Ages.

The farm has also attracted the interest of building archaeologists and architectural historians for the imposing size of its main building, undoubtedly one of the largest Monastic barns. According to researchers at the Inventaire Général du Patrimoine Culturel, it is probably the longest surviving monastic barn in Europe. The first studies of the barn date back to the mid-nineteenth century and it is mentioned in early studies of Cistercian architecture. The building was also of interest to the American art historian Walter Horn (1908–1995) and his architect collaborator Ernest Born, from the University of California at Berkeley, who came in the 1960s to carry out precise surveys and reconstructions of the building in its original state, as part of a wider study of late medieval carpentry in Western Europe.

== See also ==
- Chaalis Abbey
- Monastic grange

== Bibliography ==
- Higounet, Charles (1965). La Grange de Vaulerent : Structure et exploitation d'un terroir cistercien de la plaine de France xiie – xve siècles. Les Hommes et la terre (in French). SEVPEN.
- Blary, François (1989). Le domaine de Chaalis, xiie – xive siècles : Approches archéologiques des établissements agricoles et industriels d'une abbaye cistercienne (in French). CTHS. ISBN 2-7355-0172-8.
- Guadagnin, Rémy (1990). La Grange de Vaulerent : Une exploitation cistercienne en Plaine de France (in French). Vivre en Val-d'Oise.
- Horn, Walter; Born, Ernest (1968). "The Barn of the Cistercian Grange of Vaulerent". Festschrift Ulrich Middeldorf. De Gruyter.
- Koskas, Charles (1991). Du blé au sucre : Villeron ou les mutations d'un village en pays de France (1824–1939). Mémoire d'histoire contemporaine (in French). Université Paris XII.
- Moriceau, Jean-Marc (1994). Les Fermiers de l'Île-de-France : L'Ascension d'un patronat agricole (xve – xviiie siècles) (in French). Fayard. ISBN 2-213-59227-6.
- Moriceau, Jean-Marc (2009). À l'ombre d'une grange médiévale : chez le fermier de Vaulerant en mai 1758. Cahiers des Annales de Normandie (in French). De part et d'autre de la Normandie médiévale. Recueil d'études en hommage à François Neveux.
