= Pays de France =

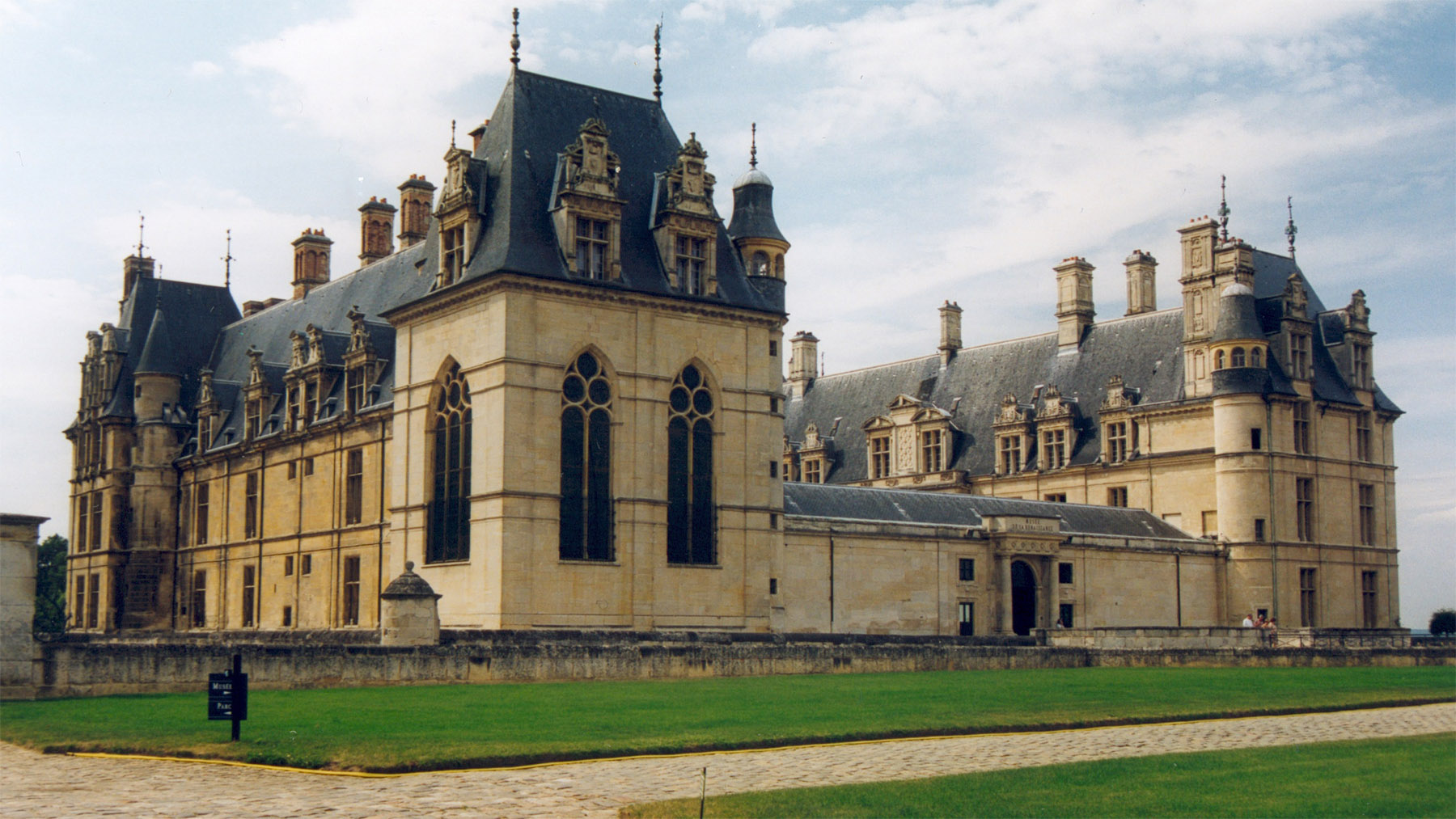
Château d'Écouen

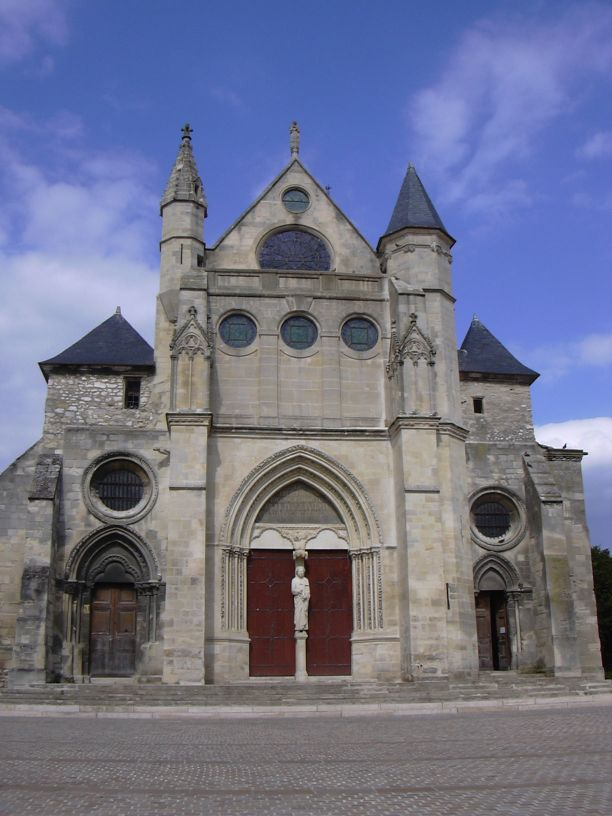
Church of St. Peter and St. Paul in Gonesse

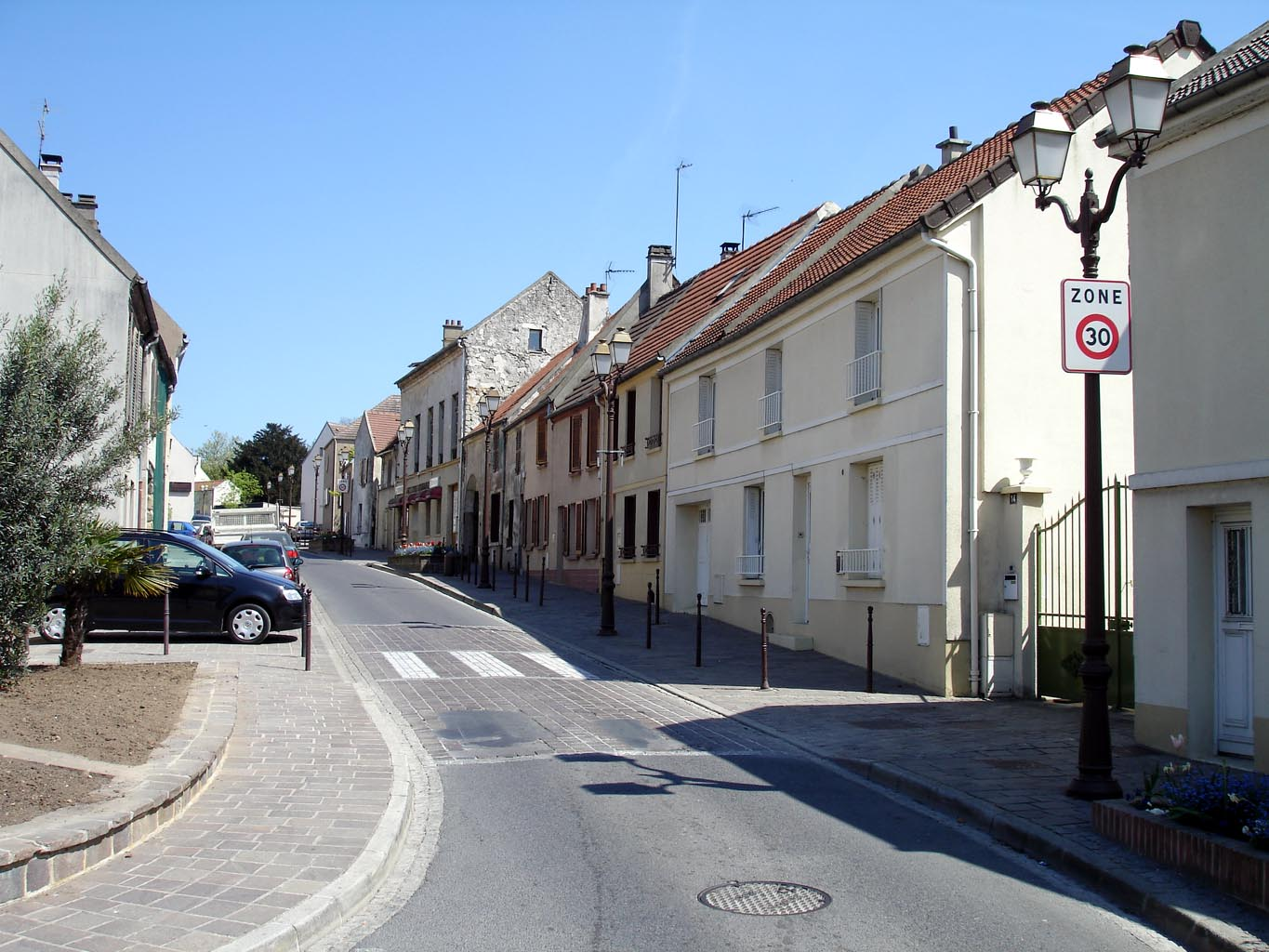
High street of Roissy-en-France

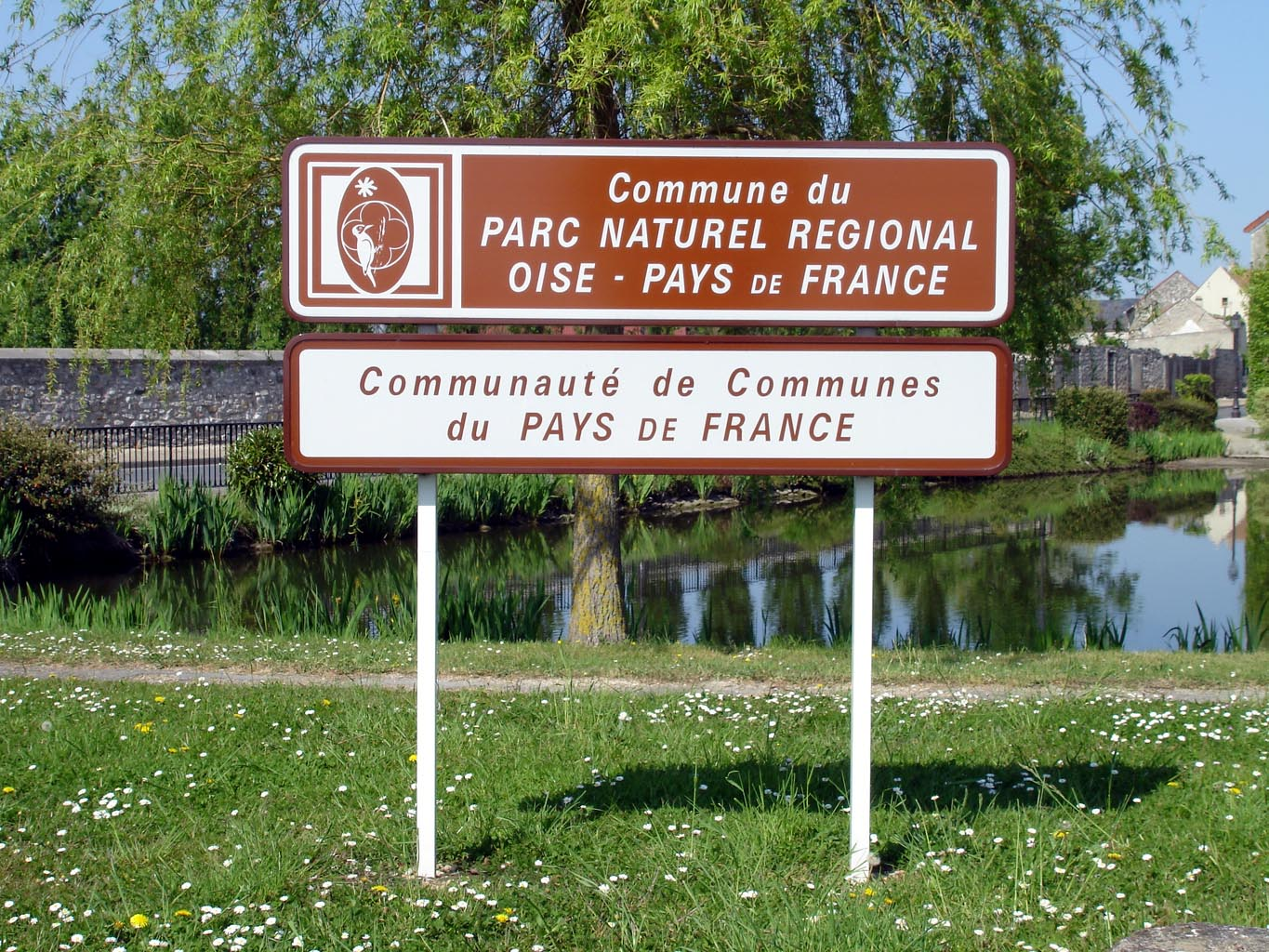
Sign for regional nature park in Villiers-le-Sec, Val-d'Oise

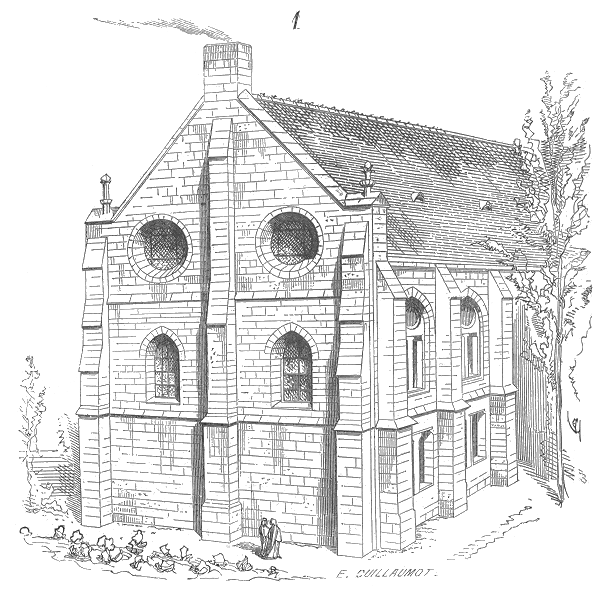
Chelles Abbey, reconstruction of nuns' dormitory

The Pays de France (French pronunciation: [pe.i də fʁɑ̃s], literally Land of France), also called the Parisis ([paʁizi]) or Plaine de France ([plɛn də fʁɑ̃s]), is a natural region located in the Île-de-France administrative region to the north of Paris, France. It is essentially a silt plain devoted to cereal crops, of which the southern part is included in the northern suburbs of Paris and greatly urbanised, and also includes Charles de Gaulle Airport.

Administratively, the region corresponds approximately to the east of Val-d'Oise department, with part of Seine-Saint-Denis and the northwestern fringe of Seine-et-Marne.

== Geography ==
=== Location ===
The Pays de France is delimited in the south west by the Seine, in the west by the forests of Montmorency and Carnelle, in the east by the River Marne and the heights of Dammartin, and in the north by the Chantilly Forest and Montmélian hill. It is bordered by the Vexin français to the west, by the Goële to the east, by the Brie region to the southeast, and by the Valois and the Pays de Thelle to the north. To the south are the Mantois, Hurepoix and Pays d'Aulnoye regions. In modern times, the Parisian agglomeration has encroached on many of these traditionally defined areas and now makes up a new form of natural region.

=== Physical geography ===
Two tectonic accidents have had a powerful influence on the geological structure of the Pays de France: the Seine syncline with the associated Saint-Denis basin, in the west, and the Louvres anticline, in the east.

The outcrops, such as the Butte-Pinson at Montmagny, Pierrefitte and Villetaneuse and the Butte d'Écouen at Villiers-le-Bel and Écouen, contain significant deposits of gypsum; which was mined both in open pits and underground until the first half of the twentieth century. The mining has weakened the structure of the ground to the extent that several risk prevention plans need to be developed.

One very large depression, 2 to 3 kilometres (1.2 to 1.9 mi) across, between Dugny and the Seine, is traversed by three small rivers: the Croult, the Vieille Mer and the Rouillon.

The upper water table (Eocene strata) includes two lower-level aquifers up to 90 metres (300 ft) in total height. It forms part of the general water table which is fed both by the watershed of the Seine and Marne and by lower aquifers. It is greatly influenced by precipitation and fluctuates significantly in depth, but in general lies close to the surface, requiring special care in sealing cellars and basements.

Until 1975, the aquifer was used for industrial purposes at Sevran and on the Saint-Denis Plain (the southern part of the Pays de France), and also for market gardening. Since the Bartonian sub-aquifer contains too many minerals for human consumption, the Lutetian sub-aquifer was occasionally tapped in Val-d'Oise.

In order to limit seasonal rising of the water table, there are plans to find new urban applications for the water. This is recommended, for example, in the environmental plan for the agglomeration community of Plaine Commune.

The Pays de France is a plain which has traditionally had a prosperous agricultural economy (particularly cereal crops and sugar beets) based on its fertile silt soils. Formerly there was extensive market gardening north of Paris; this has been progressively reduced by the expansion of built-up areas, industrial zones and warehouses.

Major north-south communication routes cross it—Route nationale 1, the A1 autoroute and the LGV Nord—and both Charles de Gaulle and Le Bourget airports lie within it. The Le Bourget marshalling yard and the first bus station in France, Garonor, are also located there.

=== Human settlement ===
The Plaine de France is one of the most fragile areas in the Île-de-France. It has been badly affected by the de-industrialisation of the region, since it had specialised in heavy industry, especially in the southern part, and several housing developments had been built there to house the workers. A significant number of these developments have been the subject of urban renewal projects, either instigated by or in association with the French National Association for Urban Renewal (Agence nationale pour la rénovation urbaine or ANRU). There are 32 sensitive urban zones within it.

During the 1980s and 1990s, the middle classes tended to leave the area, and while the average income of Parisians and residents of the Hauts-de-Seine increased 23% between 1984 and 1998, that of residents of La Courneuve, Aubervilliers or Sarcelles fell 15%.

The Plaine de France is undergoing profound changes. Every year, approximately 91,000 residents leave the area and an equivalent number settle there. Numerous urban renewal projects are underway, instigated by the municipalities or urban agglomerations such as Plaine Commune, often with the assistance of the regional governmental planning agency, the Établissement public d'aménagement de la Plaine de France. Economic expansion is being driven by, for example, the Plaine Saint-Denis and Charles de Gaulle Airport, which employs more than 85,000 people and creates associated jobs, notably in logistics.

The renewal of the area will be facilitated by planned upgrades to regional transportation infrastructure such as the RER B and D and the creation of new infrastructure such as the tramways lines 5 and 8 (under construction), the planned Tangentielle Nord railway and the CDG Express rail link between Paris and Charles de Gaulle Airport (under study).

== Name ==
The word 'France' appears in the time of the first Merovingians, in the fifth century. In the 6th century it was used to designate the entire area granted in fief by them, from the Rhine to the Loire. In Carolingian times, the area so designated was reduced to territory located between Austrasia and Neustria, and during the tenth and eleventh centuries, was further reduced to apply only to the north east of Paris. There was doubtless a subdivision of the Diocese of Paris corresponding to the area, the Archdeaconry of France.

The earliest preserved occurrence of the designation de France is in an 1126 document referring to the Abbey of St. Denis as Monasterii beati dyonisii de Francia. This abbey may be the reason for the extension of the designation to the whole region, since its possessions constituted a large part of the area. By the end of the Middle Ages, approximately all of today's region was referred to as en France or de France. Beginning in the Renaissance, it was included in a larger territory termed the Île-de-France, while the area to the north east of Paris continued to be designated "France". Numerous documents of the Ancien Régime make use of the term, which was then applied to 82 villages and hamlets.

During the French Revolution, the designation appears to have fallen into disuse. Currently, eight settlements (communes) have it as part of their names: Baillet-en-France, Belloy-en-France, Bonneuil-en-France, Châtenay-en-France, Mareil-en-France, Puiseux-en-France, Roissy-en-France, and since August 1989 Tremblay-en-France, which was previously called Tremblay-lès-Gonesse.

== History ==
The Pays de France was inhabited by hunter-gatherers during the Lower Palaeolithic, as shown by Acheulean and Levallois hand axes and racloirs which have been found at Gonesse, Villiers-le-Bel, Fontenay-en-Parisis, Puiseux-en-France and Louvres. Several finds also attest to Neolithic occupation: polished or cut axes and some drills or scrapers found in the area in the 1950s. Archaeological investigations in the Pays de France have identified more than 20 agricultural sites and three small settlements plus three fortified sites and an ancient burial ground.

During the Migration Age and the Merovingian and Carolingian eras, there are few sources on the history of the area, merely mentions of some of the settlements: Luzarches, Écouen, Ézanville, Louvres and Mareil-en-France. Four necropoles have been uncovered at Luzarches, Mareil-en-France, Sarcelles and Thimécourt. But the current pattern of villages in the Pays de France did not develop until the twelfth century.

Beginning in the twelfth century, the Plaine de France was part of the original royal demesne of the Capetian kings. Its location immediately adjacent to Paris made it economically dependent on the city from an early date. Thanks to its fertile soils, covered with a thick layer of silt, under the Ancien Régime it provided food for the capital, especially corn and bread from the bakeries at Gonesse. For this reason also, it was a coveted area, divided into fiefs also from the twelfth century on. The great monastic foundations of Paris and the region around it held a large acreage of agricultural land. In addition to the Abbey of St. Denis, which was established in the early Middle Ages, Chaalis Abbey erected three very large granges during the twelfth century for storing cereal crops, which were farmed with the assistance of lay brothers. The abbey estates of Stains at Villeneuve-sous-Dammartin, Choisy-aux-Bœufs at Vémars and Vaulerent at Villeron all exceed 200 hectares (490 acres) and were farmed intensively.

From the tenth to the seventeenth century, the majority of the Plaine de France was governed by the House of Montmorency. Successive Dukes constructed numerous castles and forts, for example the Château d'Écouen, which dates to the sixteenth century. Beginning in the Renaissance, the area rose to prominence, with the renovation and expansion of churches and improvements to aristocratic residences to symbolise local power.

In the nineteenth century, railway lines were built and caused the development of urban centres around the new stations, as far north as Fosses and Survilliers and as far east as Mitry-Mory. The first housing subdivisions developed, many to serve Parisians on holiday, and led to further urban development outside the old agricultural centres. In the twentieth century, the area then became an outlet for the rapid growth of the Parisian agglomeration, with its southern part industrialising and being massively urbanised by the development of popular housing estates along the Paris–Lille railway, for example at Villiers-le-Bel and Goussainville. This development continued between the wars, with further housing and garden cities being built in the still only lightly urbanised area. Villiers-le-Bel, Arnouville-lès-Gonesse, Gonesse, Goussainville, Aulnay-sous-Bois and Stains grew by fifty to one hundred houses a year, gradually producing a suburban residential landscape.

After the Second World War, large housing estates were rapidly built on cheap available land at places such as Saint-Denis, Sarcelles, Garges-lès-Gonesse, Aulnay-sous-Bois, Sevran and Tremblay-lès-Gonesse (now Tremblay-en-France) in response to the post-war French housing crisis; this was connected to an exodus from the countryside and to destruction of housing during the war, but also to the need to house people repatriated from Algeria (notably at Sarcelles) and to slum clearance. The French government's creation of urban prioritisation zones (zones à urbaniser en priorité) was one of the means facilitating the creation of these thousands of homes, which were urgently needed at the time, but had a severe effect on the southern part of the Pays de France, creating concentrations of poverty and de facto ethnic and social ghettos.

The Pays de France also serves important functions for the functioning of the Parisian metropolitan area, notably in the area of logistics; for example, since the early 1970s Charles de Gaulle Airport has occupied 3,500 hectares (8,600 acres) there.

However, the northern half of the area retains its rural character, which has been protected by its partial integration into a regional nature park, the Parc naturel régional Oise-Pays de France.

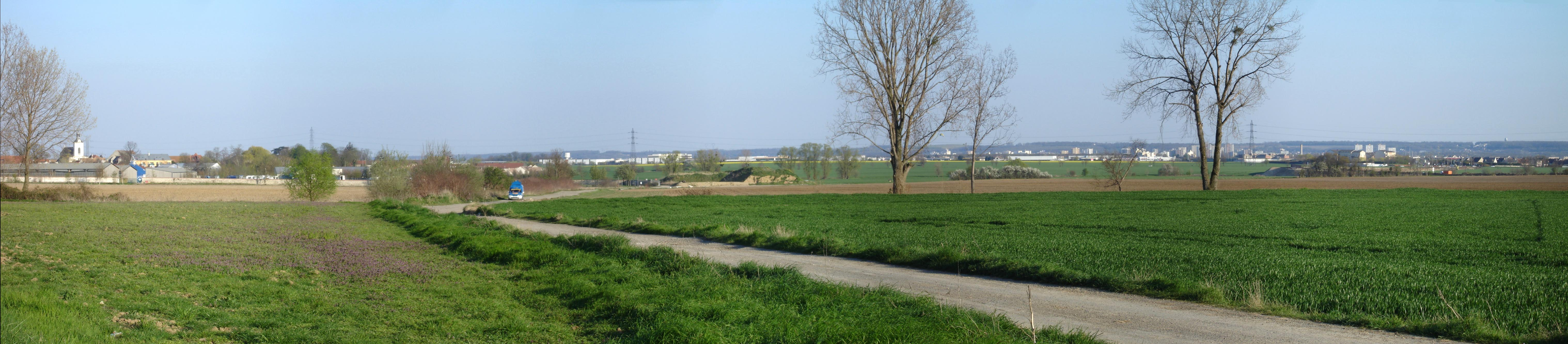
Tremblay-en-France: on the left the old village, with fields under cultivation; on the right in the distance modern housing estates and Charles de Gaulle Airport

== Tourism ==
Because of its flatness and heavy concentration on growing cereal crops, the Pays de France has relatively little tourism. However, it has numerous interesting churches, particularly from the Renaissance, such as St. Acceul at Écouen (known particularly for its stained glass windows) and the churches at Villiers-le-Bel, Gonesse, Luzarches and Belloy-en-France, and also the picturesque hilltop village of Châtenay-en-France, which offers a view of the entire region. The Château d'Écouen, built for Anne de Montmorency, became the National Museum of the Renaissance in 1977.

The rural northern section of the region, with fifteen rural settlements, makes up the Parc naturel régional Oise-Pays de France, founded in 2004.

== See also ==
- Communauté de communes de la Plaine de France
- Roissy-en-France
- Écouen
