= Villeron =

- Commune
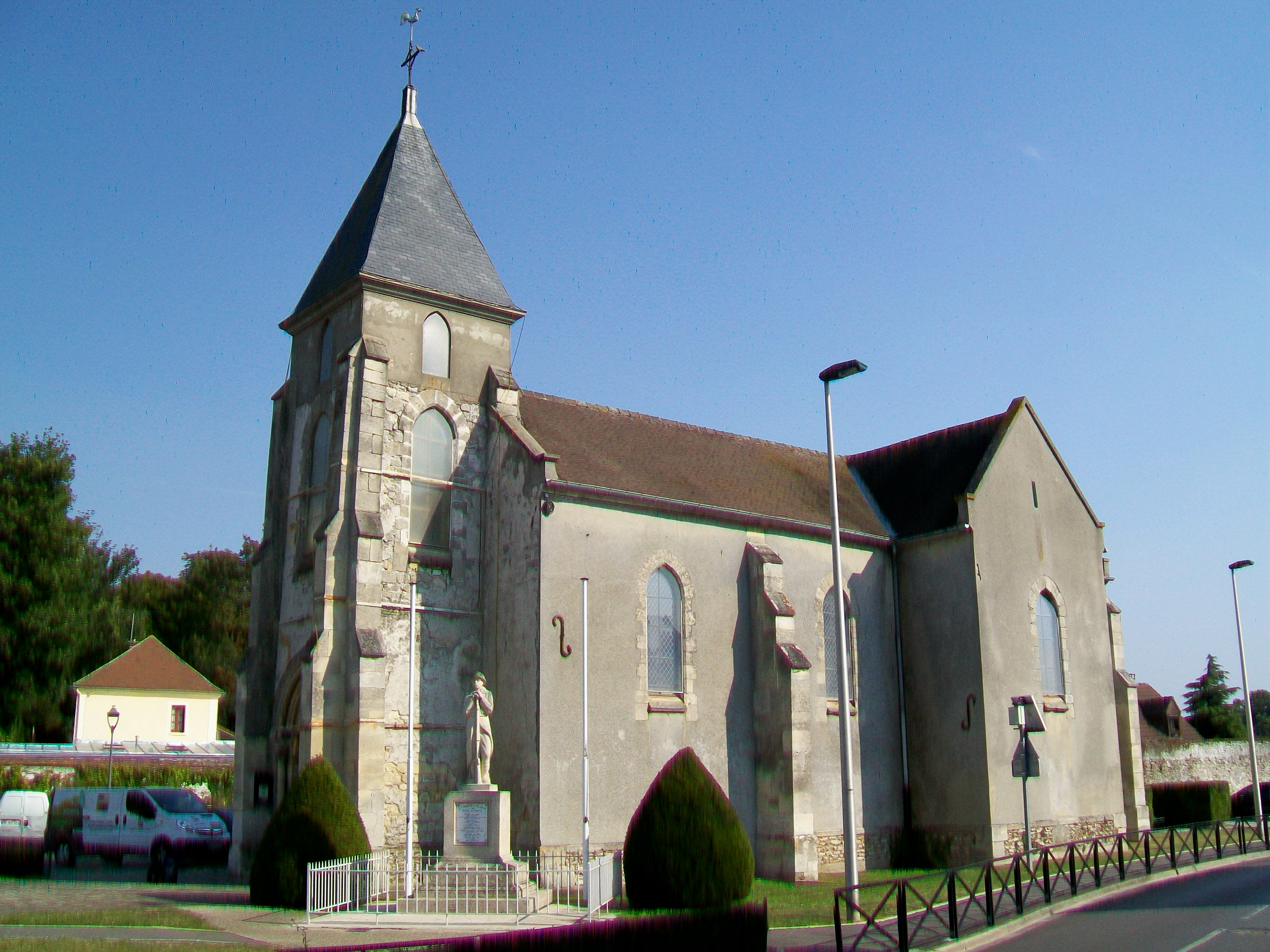
- The church of Saint-Germain-d'Auxerre, in Villeron

- Coat of arms
- Location of Villeron
- Location within France Location within Île-de-France (region)
- Coordinates: 49°03′30″N 2°32′37″E
- Country: France
- Region: Île-de-France
- Department: Val-d'Oise
- Arrondissement: Sarcelles
- Canton: Goussainville
- Intercommunality: CA Roissy Pays de France

Government
  - Mayor (2020–2026): Dominique Kudla
- Area^{1}: 5.61 km^{2} (2.17 sq mi)
- Population (2023): 1,766
  - Density: 315/km^{2} (815/sq mi)
- Time zone: UTC+01:00 (CET)
  - Summer (DST): UTC+02:00 (CEST)
- INSEE/Postal code: 95675 /95380
- ^{1} French Land Register data, which excludes lakes, ponds, glaciers > 1 km^{2} (0.386 sq mi or 247 acres) and river estuaries.

Villeron (French pronunciation: [vilʁɔ̃]) is a commune in the Val-d'Oise department in Île-de-France in northern France.

The town is bordered by Louvres, Puiseux-en-France, Marly-la-Ville, Survilliers, Vémars and Chennevières-lès-Louvres.

== See also ==
- Communes of the Val-d'Oise department
