= Chennevières =

== Geography ==
Chennevières is the name or part of the name of two communes of France:

- Chennevières-lès-Louvres in the Val-d'Oise département
- Chennevières-sur-Marne in the Val-de-Marne département

== People ==
- Charles-Philippe de Chennevières-Pointel, a French writer and art historian
