= Lycée Léonard de Vinci =

Lycée Léonard de Vinci may refer to:

Schools in the Paris area:

- Istituto Statale Italiano Leonardo Da Vinci (Lycée italien Leonardo da Vinci) in Paris
- Lycée des Métiers du Bois Léonard de Vinci in Paris
- Lycée professionnel Léonard-de-Vinci in Bagneaux, Hauts-de-Seine
- Lycée Léonard de Vinci in Levallois-Perret
- Lycée Léonard de Vinci in Melun
- Lycée Léonard de Vinci in Saint-Michel-sur-Orge
- Lycée Léonard de Vinci in Saint-Witz
- Lycée Léonard de Vinci in Tremblay-en-France

Schools in other parts of France:

- Lycée Léonard de Vinci in Amboise
- Lycée Léonard de Vinci in Antibes
- Lycée Léonard de Vinci in Blanquefort, Gironde
- Lycée Léonard de Vinci in Calais
- Lycée Professionnel Léonard de Vinci in Marseille
- Lycée public Léonard de Vinci – Monistrol-sur-Loire
- Lycée Léonard de Vinci in Montaigu, Vendée
- Lycée des Métiers de l'Eco-Construction et du Bâtiment Léonard de Vinci in Montpellier
- Lycée Professionnel Léonard de Vinci in Nantes
- Lycée Léonard de Vinci in Soissons
- Lycée Léonard de Vinci in Villefontaine
