= Leonardo da Vinci School =

Leonardo da Vinci School may refer to:

- Istituto Statale Italiano Leonardo Da Vinci (Lycée italien Leonardo da Vinci), an Italian international primary and secondary school in Paris, France
- Lycée Léonard de Vinci (disambiguation), various senior high schools/sixth-form colleges in France
- Leonardo da Vinci High School - Davis, California
- Leonardo da Vinci High School (Buffalo, New York)
- Leonardo da Vinci Engineering School - Paris, France
- I.S. 061 Leonardo Da Vinci (Q061) in Queens, of the New York City Department of Education
- Leonardo da Vinci School (K-8) of the Sacramento City Unified School District
- Leonardo da Vinci School for Gifted Learners (K-8) of the Green Bay Area Public School District
- Leonardo Da Vinci Academy of Arts & Sciences (PreK-8) in Toronto
- Leonardo Da Vinci Academy in Rivière-des-Prairies, Quebec of the English Montreal School Board
