= Chaalis Abbey =

Former abbey and museum in Fontaine-Chaalis, France

Coordinates: 49°8′51″N 2°41′12″E

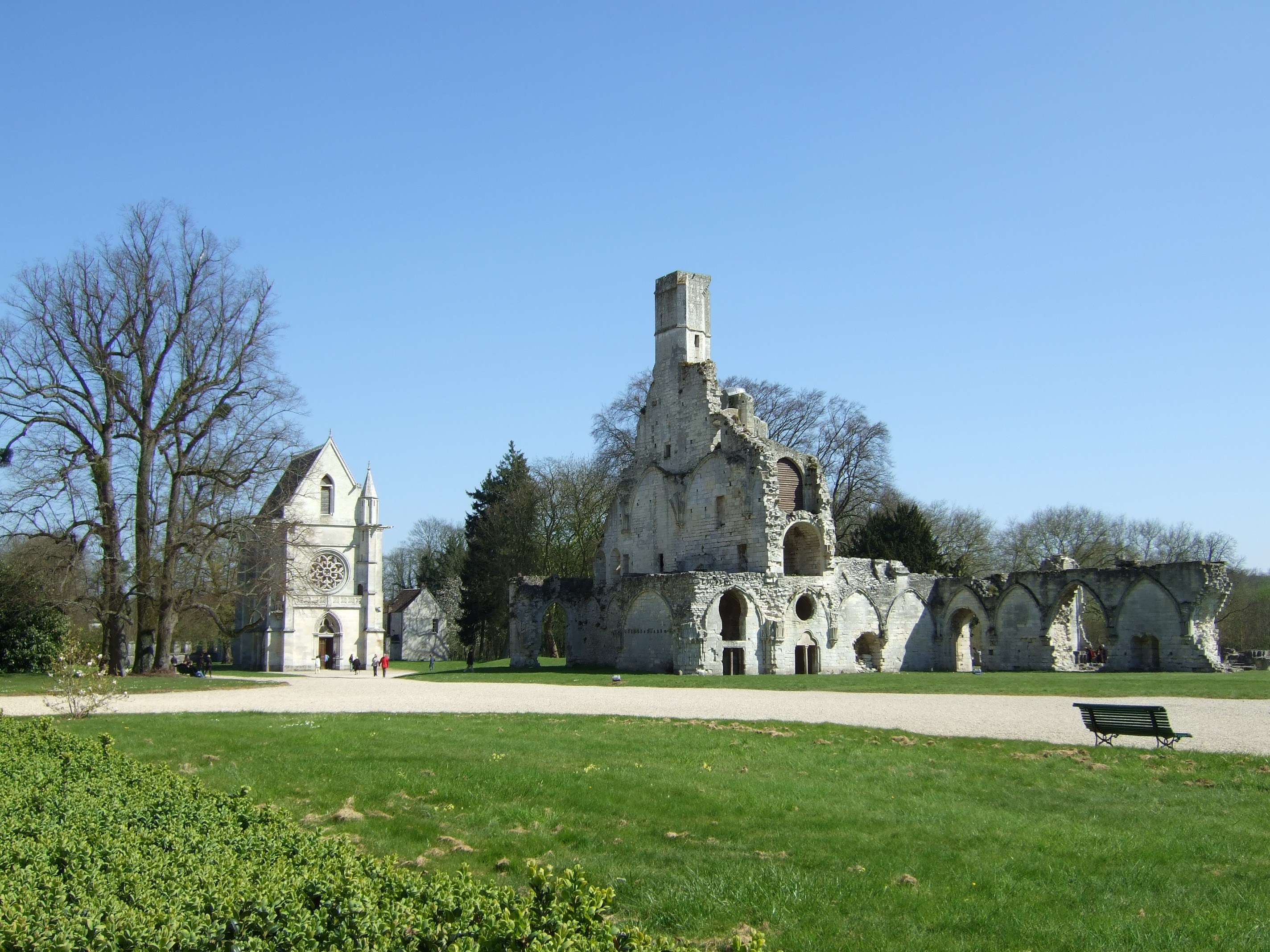
Remains of Chaalis Abbey

Chaalis Abbey (French: Abbaye de Chaalis, French pronunciation: [abei də ʃali]) was a French Cistercian abbey north of Paris, at Fontaine-Chaalis, near Ermenonville, now in Oise.

== History ==
It was founded in 1136 by Louis VI of France. There had previously been a Benedictine monastery in the same place. Most of the buildings fell into ruins thanks to mismanagement on the part of the commendatory abbots. Among the ruins, a chapel with important frescos by Primaticcio survives intact.

For Louis, Count of Clermont and commendatory abbot of Chaalis, the architect Jean Aubert created plans for the reconstruction of the abbey in 1736. Begun in 1739 and intended as a large quadrangle, only the entrance wing with the abbot's residence was completed. Further work was halted in 1745 due to lack of funds and never resumed.

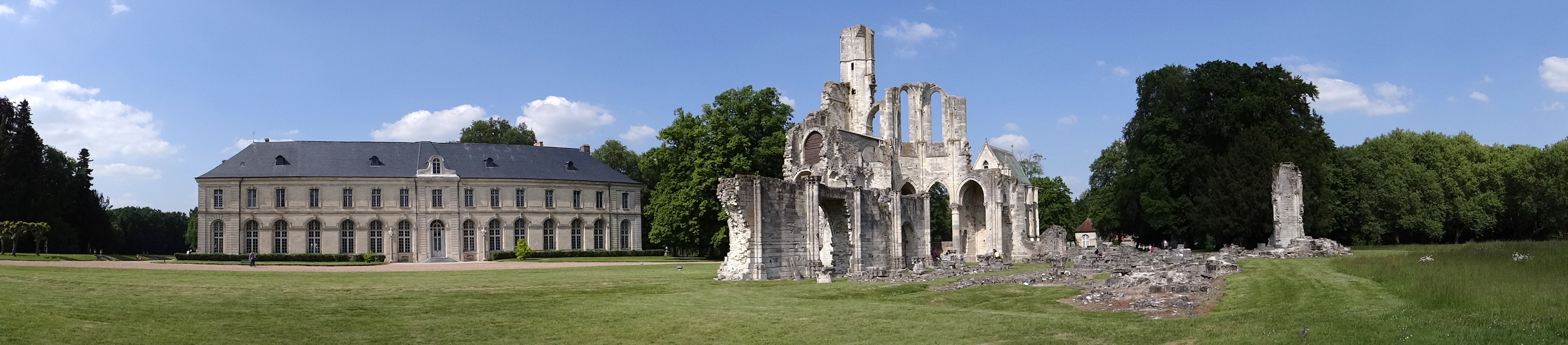
Jean Aubert's château, now the museum, next to the ruins of the former abbey

The monastery was sold and demolished during the French Revolution.

== Museum ==
The former abbey is now the location of an art museum, the Musée Jacquemart-André. Like the museum of the same name in Paris it houses a part of the former collection of artworks of Nélie Jacquemart-André. At her death in 1912 she gave it to the Institut de France and asked that a museum should be created in Chaalis, where she had spent her childhood.

The museum continues to display this very rich collection which features paintings by Giotto, Cima da Conegliano, Luca Signorelli, Francesco Francia, Lorenzo di Credi, Joos van Cleve, Tintoretto, Palma the Younger, Jan Davidsz de Heem, Philippe de Champaigne, Charles Le Brun, Nicolas de Largillière, François Desportes, François Boucher, Rosalba Carriera, Giovanni Paolo Pannini and Jean-Baptiste Greuze; sculptures by Baccio Bandinelli, François Girardon, Jean-Antoine Houdon, Augustin Pajou, Jean-Baptiste Lemoyne and Edme-François-Étienne Gois; furniture and decorative art; and a collection of Indian items.

== See also ==
- Vaulerent barn

== Bibliography ==
- Kimball, Fiske (1943). The Creation of the Rococo. Philadelphia Museum of Art. Dover 1980 reprint: ISBN 0486239896.
- Neuman, Robert (1996). Aubert, Jean, vol. 2, p. 701, in The Dictionary of Art, 34 volumes, edited by Jane Turner. New York: Grove. ISBN 9781884446009.
