= Les Passementeries de l'Île de France =

French company

Les Passementeries de l'île de France is a French company that designs and manufactures traditional French tassels.

As of 2019, the company was the only French tassel manufacturer whose labor and materials were entirely derived from France, with no overseas production and with exclusively local workers. The company is located near Belloy-en-France.
