= Belloy-en-France =

- Commune
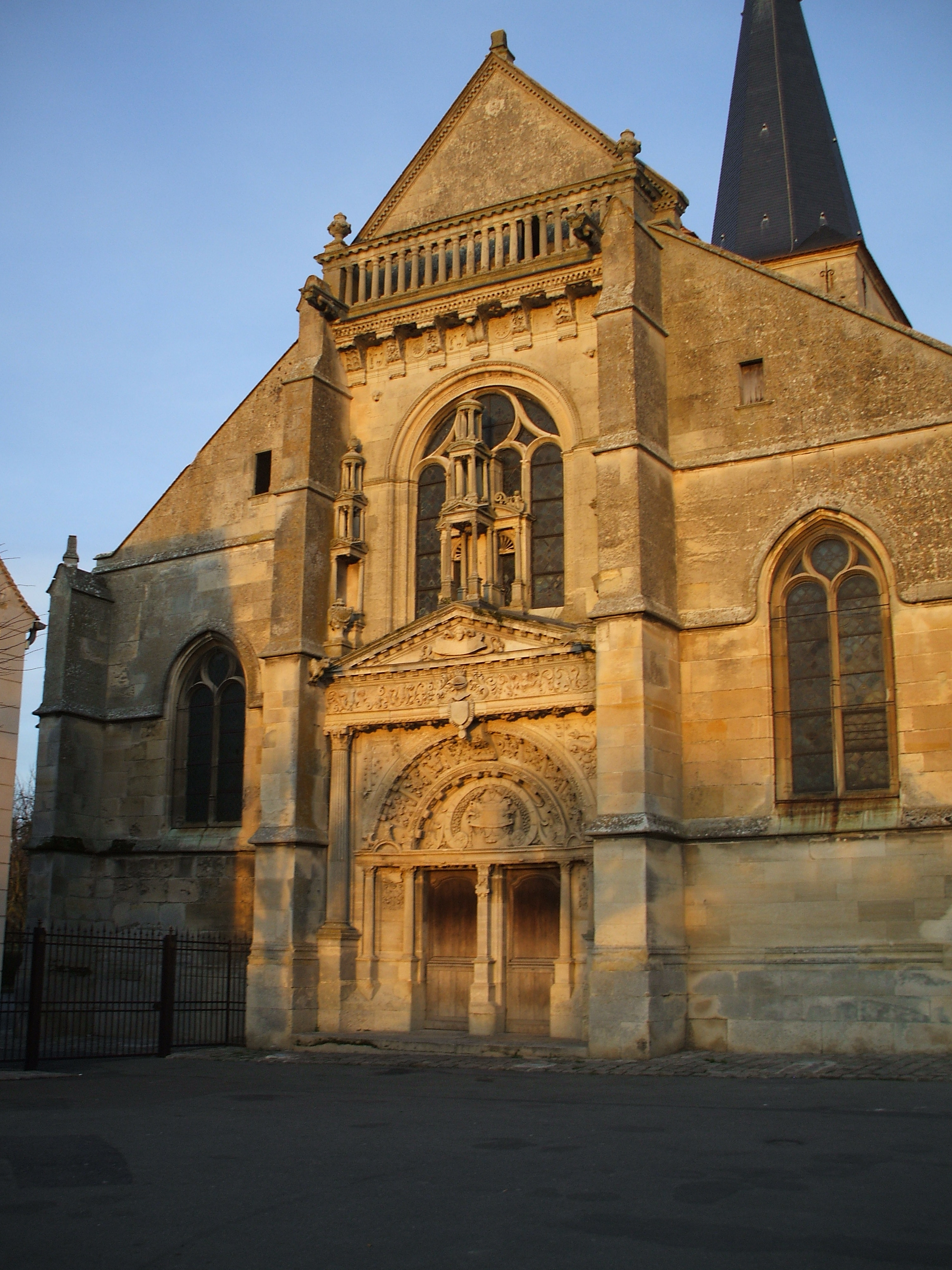
- St. Georges

- Coat of arms
- Location of Belloy-en-France
- Location within France Location within Île-de-France (region)
- Coordinates: 49°05′25″N 2°22′19″E
- Country: France
- Region: Île-de-France
- Department: Val-d'Oise
- Arrondissement: Sarcelles
- Canton: Fosses
- Intercommunality: Carnelle Pays de France

Government
  - Mayor (2020–2026): Raphaël Barbarossa
- Area^{1}: 9.49 km^{2} (3.66 sq mi)
- Population (2023): 2,250
  - Density: 237/km^{2} (614/sq mi)
- Demonym: Belloisiens
- Time zone: UTC+01:00 (CET)
  - Summer (DST): UTC+02:00 (CEST)
- INSEE/Postal code: 95056 /95270
- Website: belloy-en-france.fr
- ^{1} French Land Register data, which excludes lakes, ponds, glaciers > 1 km^{2} (0.386 sq mi or 247 acres) and river estuaries.

Belloy-en-France (French pronunciation: [bɛlwa ɑ̃ fʁɑ̃s]; lit. 'Belloy-in-France') is a commune in the Val-d'Oise department in Île-de-France in northern France. Belloy–Saint-Martin station has rail connections to Luzarches, Sarcelles and Paris.

== Population ==
Historical population
Year	Pop.	±% p.a.
1968	1,065	—
1975	1,710	+7.00%
1982	1,645	−0.55%
1990	1,540	−0.82%
1999	1,536	−0.03%
2007	1,819	+2.14%
2012	2,098	+2.90%
2017	2,189	+0.85%
2023	2,250	+0.46%
Source: INSEE

== Monuments ==
The Saint Georges church was built in the 13th century on the site of a primitive shrine, a very early place of pilgrimage. The façade is in Renaissance style; the gate, sometimes attributed to Jean Bullant, consists of a tympanum leading to columns grooved in Corinthian capitals, the whole surrounded by a very decorated classic entablature, surmounted in the extremities by two roof lanterns. The salamander and the initials of the king Francis I of France appear on the spandrels.

The base of the bell tower and the chapel of the Virgin Mary are the oldest parts of the building. The choir has a rib vault, strengthened by liernes in the nave and the aisles.

The stone baptismal fonts date from 1524 and are decorated with bas-reliefs representing plants. The building also has a gravestone in double effigy of Guillaume de Belloy, a pulpit and an 18th-century panellings, opposite a 17th-century banc d'œuvre surmounted by a pediment.

Belloy-en-France is the location of the only remaining French manufacturer of traditional tassels, Les Passementeries de l'île de France, as of 2019.

== See also ==
- Communes of the Val-d'Oise department
