= Monastic grange =

Agricultural land shared by medieval clergy

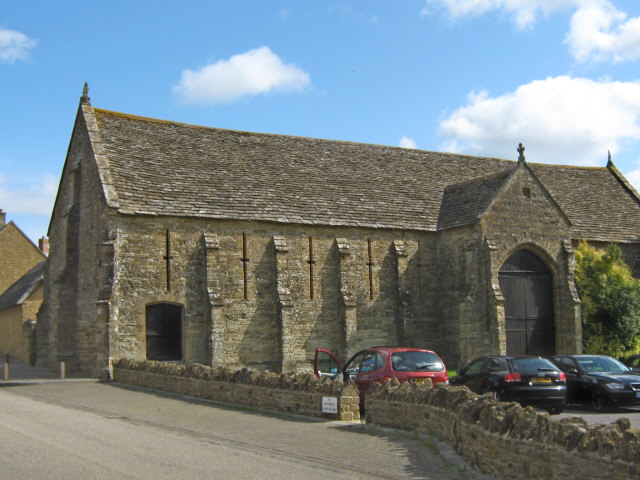
The Abbey Barn, Yeovil, Somerset, England

Monastic granges were outlying landholdings held by monasteries independent of the manorial system. The first granges were owned by the Cistercians, and other orders followed. Wealthy monastic houses had many granges, most of which were largely agricultural providing food for the monastic community. A grange might be established adjacent to the monastery, but others were established wherever it held lands, some at a considerable distance. Some granges were worked by lay brothers belonging to the order, others by paid labourers.

There were six known types of grange: agrarian; sheep runs; cattle ranges and holdings; horse studs; fisheries; and industrial complexes. Industrial granges were significant in the development of medieval industries, particularly iron working.

== Description ==
Granges were landed estates used for food production, centred on a farm and out-buildings and possibly a mill or a tithe barn. The word grange comes through French graunge from Latin granica, meaning a granary. The granges might be located at some distance from the monastery: for example Byland Abbey in North Yorkshire maintained an industrial grange in Denby Dale, some 60 miles (97 km) away. They could farm livestock or produce crops. Specialist crops might include apples, hops or grapes to make beverages. Some granges had fish-ponds to supply Friday meals to the monastery. The produce could sustain the monks or be sold for profit. While under monastic control, granges might be run by a steward and worked by local farm labourers or perhaps lay brothers.

== England ==
At the Dissolution of the Monasteries, all monastic land was seized by Henry VIII. The lands were sold or given to Henry's followers. Granges often retained their names and many can still be found in the British landscape today.

== See also ==
- Vaulerent barn
