= Saint-Witz =

- Commune
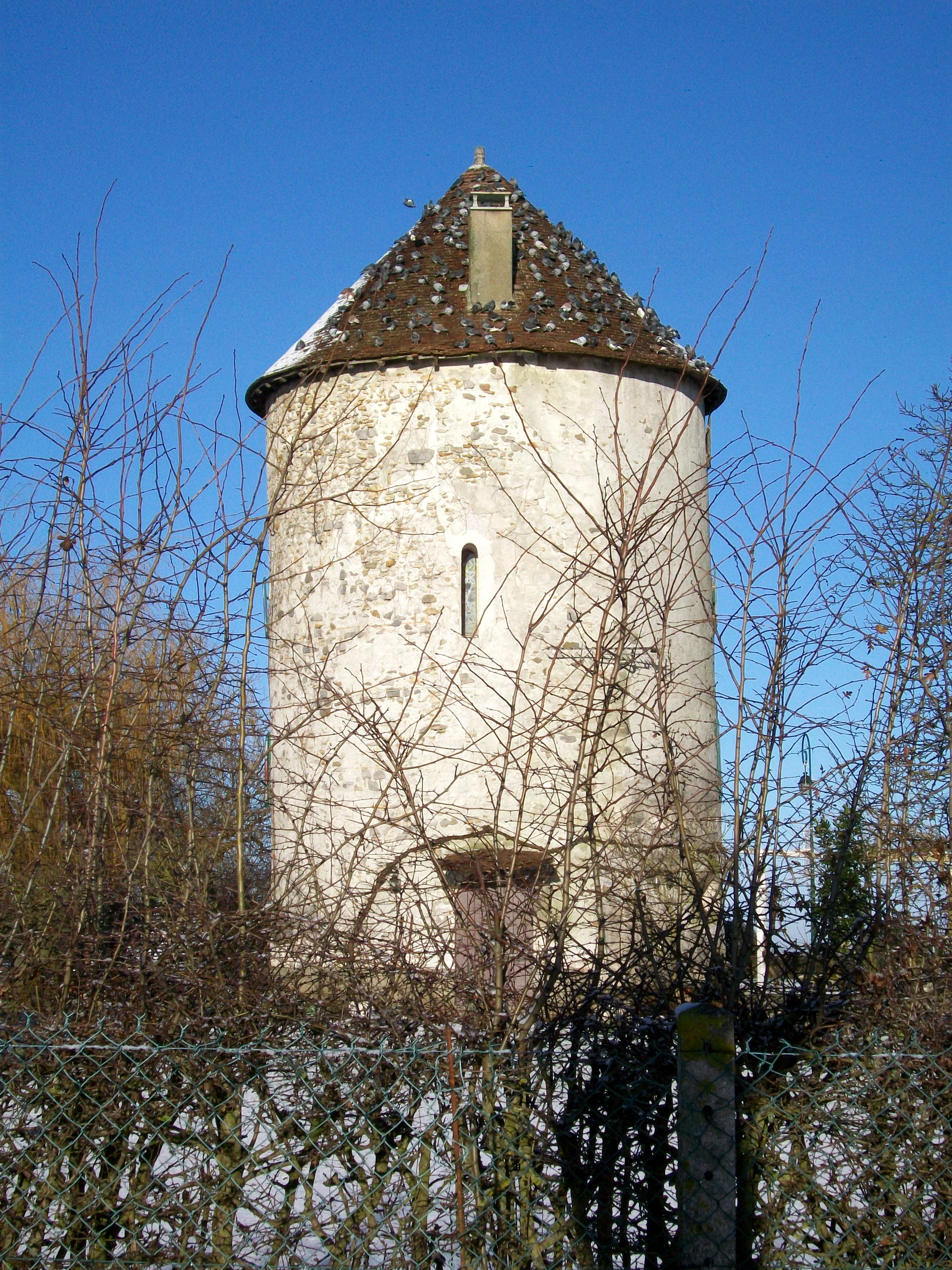
- The old mill of Saint-Witz

- Coat of arms
- Location of Saint-Witz
- Location within France Location within Île-de-France (region)
- Coordinates: 49°05′33″N 2°34′09″E
- Country: France
- Region: Île-de-France
- Department: Val-d'Oise
- Arrondissement: Sarcelles
- Canton: Goussainville
- Intercommunality: CA Roissy Pays de France

Government
  - Mayor (2020–2026): Frédéric Moizard
- Area^{1}: 7.66 km^{2} (2.96 sq mi)
- Elevation: 110 m (360 ft)
- Highest elevation: 195 m (640 ft)
- Lowest elevation: 109 m (358 ft)
- Population (2023): 2,724
  - Density: 356/km^{2} (921/sq mi)
- Time zone: UTC+01:00 (CET)
  - Summer (DST): UTC+02:00 (CEST)
- INSEE/Postal code: 95580 /95470
- ^{1} French Land Register data, which excludes lakes, ponds, glaciers > 1 km^{2} (0.386 sq mi or 247 acres) and river estuaries.

Saint-Witz (French pronunciation: [sɛ̃ vits]) is a commune in the Val-d'Oise department in Île-de-France in northern France.

== Geography ==
=== Climate ===
Saint-Witz has an oceanic climate (Köppen climate classification Cfb). The average annual temperature in Saint-Witz is 11.9 °C (53.4 °F). The average annual rainfall is 676.8 mm (26.65 in) with December as the wettest month. The temperatures are highest on average in July, at around 20.0 °C (68.0 °F), and lowest in January, at around 4.0 °C (39.2 °F). The highest temperature ever recorded in Saint-Witz was 41.4 °C (106.5 °F) on 25 July 2019; the coldest temperature ever recorded was −12.3 °C (9.9 °F) on 7 January 2009.

Climate data for Saint-Witz (1991−2020 normals, extremes 2008−present)
Month	Jan	Feb	Mar	Apr	May	Jun	Jul	Aug	Sep	Oct	Nov	Dec	Year
Record high °C (°F)	14.1 (57.4)	19.6 (67.3)	24.2 (75.6)	28.7 (83.7)	30.8 (87.4)	36.0 (96.8)	41.4 (106.5)	37.5 (99.5)	34.3 (93.7)	28.3 (82.9)	20.5 (68.9)	15.7 (60.3)	41.4 (106.5)
Mean daily maximum °C (°F)	6.3 (43.3)	7.9 (46.2)	11.9 (53.4)	16.4 (61.5)	19.2 (66.6)	22.5 (72.5)	25.4 (77.7)	25.0 (77.0)	21.2 (70.2)	16.1 (61.0)	10.7 (51.3)	7.4 (45.3)	15.8 (60.4)
Daily mean °C (°F)	4.0 (39.2)	5.0 (41.0)	7.9 (46.2)	11.5 (52.7)	14.4 (57.9)	17.7 (63.9)	20.0 (68.0)	19.8 (67.6)	16.5 (61.7)	12.6 (54.7)	8.2 (46.8)	5.1 (41.2)	11.9 (53.4)
Mean daily minimum °C (°F)	1.8 (35.2)	2.0 (35.6)	4.0 (39.2)	6.6 (43.9)	9.6 (49.3)	12.8 (55.0)	14.7 (58.5)	14.6 (58.3)	11.8 (53.2)	9.1 (48.4)	5.6 (42.1)	2.8 (37.0)	8.0 (46.4)
Record low °C (°F)	−12.3 (9.9)	−10.4 (13.3)	−8.4 (16.9)	−2.5 (27.5)	1.5 (34.7)	6.5 (43.7)	7.8 (46.0)	8.2 (46.8)	3.5 (38.3)	−0.7 (30.7)	−5.1 (22.8)	−7.4 (18.7)	−12.3 (9.9)
Average precipitation mm (inches)	54.4 (2.14)	47.7 (1.88)	45.0 (1.77)	37.4 (1.47)	72.2 (2.84)	64.9 (2.56)	58.1 (2.29)	59.3 (2.33)	47.4 (1.87)	56.8 (2.24)	61.0 (2.40)	72.6 (2.86)	676.8 (26.65)
Average precipitation days (≥ 1.0 mm)	11.3	9.5	9.2	8.4	9.3	9.1	7.2	8.5	7.2	11.0	10.6	12.8	114.0
Source: Météo-France

== Population ==
Historical population
Year	Pop.	±% p.a.
1968	163	—
1975	355	+11.76%
1982	2,027	+28.26%
1990	2,074	+0.29%
1999	1,925	−0.82%
2007	2,562	+3.64%
2012	2,552	−0.08%
2017	2,383	−1.36%
2023	2,724	+2.25%
Source: INSEE

== Education ==
Public secondary schools:

- Collège Françoise Dolto, a public junior high school serving Saint-Witz, is in Marly-la-Ville.
- Saint-Witz has one public senior high school: Lycée Léonard de Vinci.

Collège Institut Paul Ricoeur/Lycée Institut Paul RICOEUR is in nearby Louvres.

Institut Saint-Dominique, a private Catholic preschool through senior high, is in nearby Mortefontaine, Oise.

== See also ==
- Communes of the Val-d'Oise department
