= Robert Neuman =

American art historian

Robert Michael Neuman is a professor of art history at Florida State University, where he specializes in early modern European art, with an emphasis on social and religious history, gender studies, and the intersection of high art and popular culture. His scholarship encompasses all media - painting, sculpture, architecture, prints, decorative arts, and costume.

His 1994 book, Robert de Cotte and the Perfection of Architecture in Eighteenth-Century France, is the first comprehensive examination of the French royal architect, Robert de Cotte, during a period when Paris became the center of courtly fashion. He also regularly serves on doctoral dissertation committees.

== Biography ==
Neuman holds a PhD from the University of Michigan and was formerly a book review editor for the Journal of the Society of Architectural Historians (JSAH). He was the 1986-87 recipient of the Florida State University Teaching Award, the 1994 Millard Meiss Publication Fund, as well as various other teaching awards.

== Current projects ==
He is currently working as principal investigator for a project with the Florida Center for Advising & Academic Support (FCAAS), as well as researching the role of American movies in shaping perceptions of historic architecture.

== Selected publications ==
- From Hollywood to Disneyland: Walt Disney’s Dream Park and the Influence of American Movies (Jefferson, NC: McFarland, 2022).
- Baroque and Rococo Art and Architecture. Pearson: Upper Saddle River, NJ, 2013.
- "Main Street, USA." In Disneyland and Culture: Essays on the Parks and Their Influence, edited by Kathy Merlock Jackson and Mark I. West. Jefferson, NC: McFarland, 2010.
- Biographical entries, Oxford Art Online (Dictionary of Art., Ed. Jane Turner. 36 vols. New York: Grove: 1996).
- Robert de Cotte and the Perfection of Architecture in Eighteenth-Century France. Chicago: University of Chicago Press, 1994.
