= Charles Higounet =

French medievalist (1911–1988)

Charles Higounet (13 January 1911 – 8 April 1988) was a French medievalist who specialized in bastides and the Middle Ages in the south-west of France.

== Biography ==
Charles Higounet was born on 13 January 1911. During the second world war, Higounet was imprisoned from 1940 to 1943 in Silesia, where he was allowed to access the library of the University of Breslau. Here he gathered materials for his last book, which was published in 1989, after his death. He taught at Bordeaux III University from 1946 to 1979, where a research center was named after him. He was a specialist of bastides, a new and specific form of city in the Middle Ages, and the history of south-west France. He was especially noted for his history of Bordeaux, for which he won the grand prix Gobert in 1973. He also led a team that worked on a historical atlas for French cities.

He wrote a volume of Que sais-je?, a famous French editorial collection, on various forms of writing. The book has been re-edited more than ten times.

Higounet died on 8 April 1988. After his death, his colleagues published a collection of papers in the journal Annales du Midi in his honour.

== Published works ==
- Les Allemands en Europe centrale et orientale au Moyen âge 1989 Aubier, ISBN 2-7007-2223-X
- Atlas historique des villes de France, 1982
- Le Comté de Comminges, 1949
- Défrichements et villeneuves du Bassin parisien, 1990 Editions du Centre national de la recherche scientifique, ISBN 2-222-04210-0, 384 P
- L'Écriture, 1976
- La Gascogne au XIVe et XVe siècles, 1969
- Grand cartulaire de La Sauve-Majeure, 1996, Fédération historique du Sud-Ouest, ISBN 2-85408-026-2
- Histoire de Bordeaux..., dir, 1962 Editions Privat, ISBN 2-7089-4711-7, 418 p
- Histoire de l'Aquitaine, dir, 1976
- Paysages et villages neufs du Moyen âge, 1975
- Recherches sur l'histoire de l'occupation du sol du Périgord, 1978, Editions du Centre national de la recherche scientifique, ISBN 2-222-02279-7
- Recueil des actes de l'Abbaye cistercienne de Bonnefont en Comminges, publ. by Charles Samaran,... and Charles Higounet, 1970, Collection de documents inédits sur l'histoire de France. Série in 8,
- La Seigneurie et le vignoble de Château-Latour, 1974
- Villes, sociétés et économies médiévales, recueil d'articles, 1992
- L'écriture, Que Sais-je, Presses universitaires de France, ISBN 2-13-039397-7, 2003.

== Articles ==
- "Les anciennes bastides du Sud-Ouest de la France", L’Information Historique, 1946, ps. 28–35.
- "Bastides et frontières", Le Moyen Age, 1948, t. LIV.
- "Les bastides du Sud-Ouest", Le Moyen Age, 1948.
- "La frange orientale des bastides", Annales du Midi, Tolosa, Privat, 1948–1949, t. LXI, ps. 359–367.
- "Villeneuves et bastides désertées", Villages désertés et histoire économique (XI-XVIIIe siècle), Les hommes et la terre-IX- Ecole pratique des Hautes Etudes, Paris, S.E.V.P.E.N., 1965, ps. 253–265.
- "Nouvelle approche sur les bastides du Sud-Ouest aquitain", Revue Urbanisme, Paris, 1967, n°101, ps. 32–35.
- "Les villeneuves du Piémont et les bastides de Gascogne (XIIe-XIVe siècles)", Compte-Rendus de l'Acad. des Inscr. et Belles Lettres, Paris, 1970, ps. 130–139.
- "Paysages et Villages neufs du Moyen Age", recueil d'articles, Bordeaux, 1975, 492 p.
- "Les bastides en question", Revue Urbanisme, Paris, n°173–174, Paris, 1979, p. 6–10.
- "La place dans les bastides médiévales", Plazas et sociabilité en Europe et Amérique latine, Publications de la Case de Velasquez, sér. Recherches en Sciences Sociales, Paris, fasc. VI, 1982, p. 119
- "Villes, sociétés et économies médiévales" / Recueil d'articles de Charles Higounet, Talence, Institut d'histoire, Université de Bordeaux III, Fédération historique du Sud-Ouest, 1992.
