= Marly-la-Ville =

- Commune
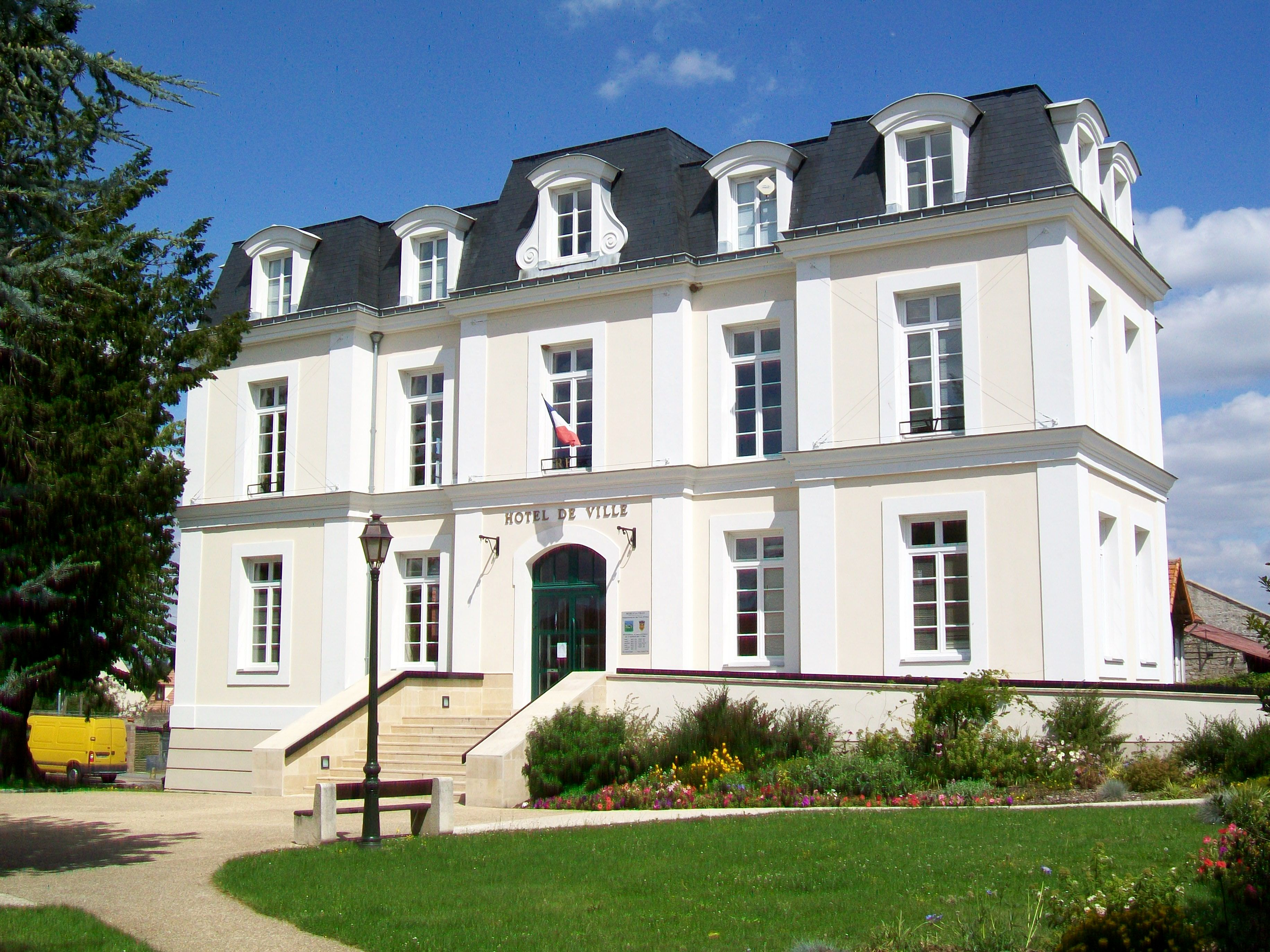
- The town hall of Marly-la-Ville

- Coat of arms
- Location of Marly-la-Ville
- Location within France Location within Île-de-France (region)
- Coordinates: 49°04′54″N 2°30′01″E
- Country: France
- Region: Île-de-France
- Department: Val-d'Oise
- Arrondissement: Sarcelles
- Canton: Goussainville
- Intercommunality: CA Roissy Pays de France

Government
  - Mayor (2020–2026): André Specq
- Area^{1}: 8.62 km^{2} (3.33 sq mi)
- Population (2023): 6,022
  - Density: 699/km^{2} (1,810/sq mi)
- Demonym: Marlysiens
- Time zone: UTC+01:00 (CET)
  - Summer (DST): UTC+02:00 (CEST)
- INSEE/Postal code: 95371 /95670
- Website: marly-la-ville.fr
- ^{1} French Land Register data, which excludes lakes, ponds, glaciers > 1 km^{2} (0.386 sq mi or 247 acres) and river estuaries.

Marly-la-Ville (French pronunciation: [maʁli la vil]; lit. 'Marly-the-City') is a commune in the Val-d'Oise department in Île-de-France in northern France, 25 km north of Paris.

== History ==
Thomas-François Dalibard lived at 15 rue du Colonel Fabien, a classical eighteenth-century mansion. He was a naturalist and a disciple of Georges-Louis Leclerc de Buffon. He translated and published the works of Carl Linnaeus thus introducing Linnaean nomenclature in France. Also a devoted physicist, he tested the experimental ideas of Benjamin Franklin at his house, completing the first capture electrical charge from lightning. Thus, the lightning rod was born at Marly-la-Ville.

== Population ==
Historical population
Year	Pop.	±% p.a.
1968	1,987	—
1975	2,419	+2.85%
1982	5,078	+11.18%
1990	5,128	+0.12%
1999	5,696	+1.17%
2007	5,549	−0.33%
2012	5,531	−0.06%
2017	5,677	+0.52%
2023	6,022	+0.99%
Source: INSEE

== See also ==
- Communes of the Val-d'Oise department
