= Chennevières-lès-Louvres =

- Commune
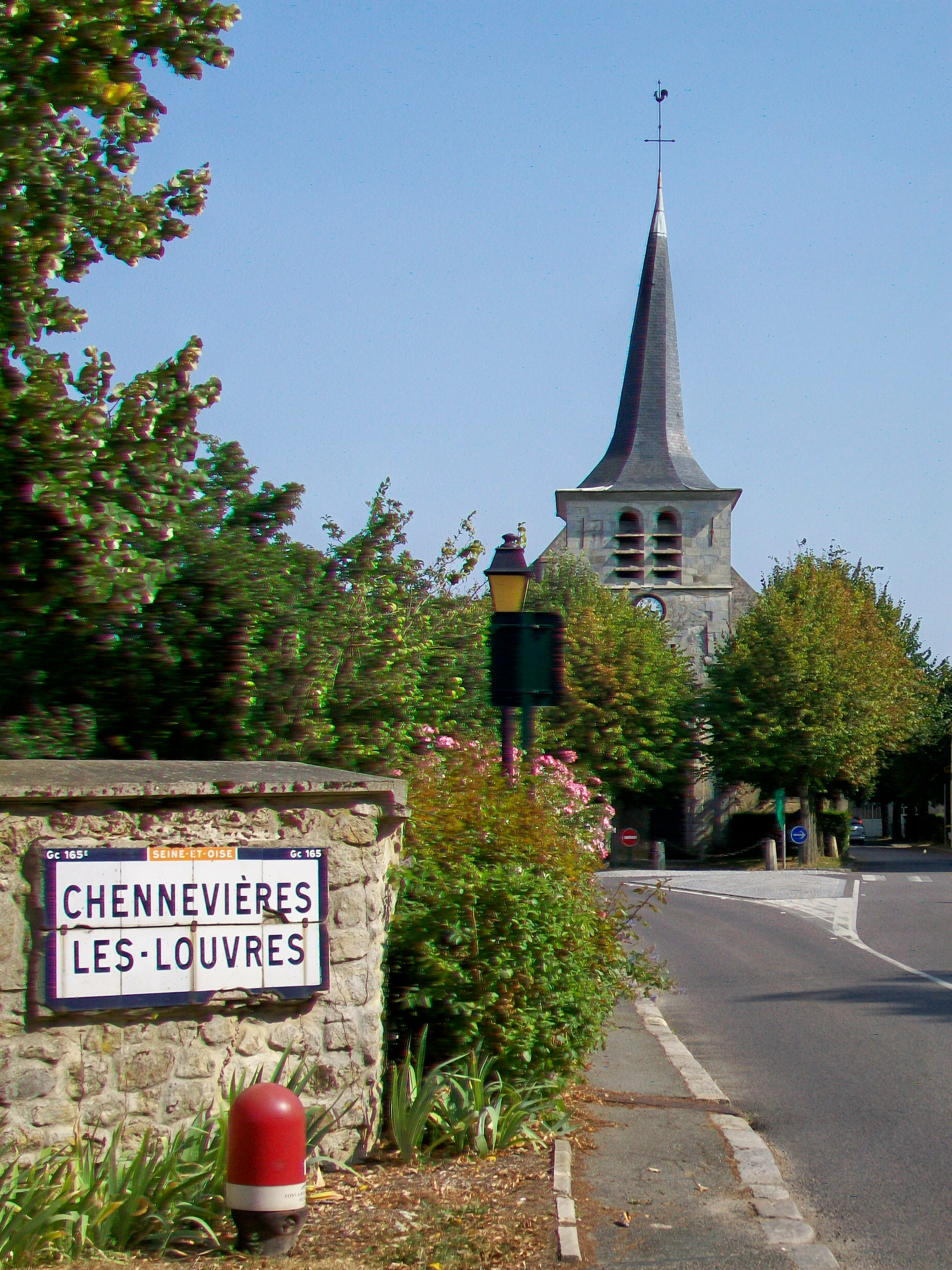
- The Rue de Louvres, with a view of the church in Chennevières-lès-Louvres

- Coat of arms
- Location of Chennevières-lès-Louvres
- Location within France Location within Île-de-France (region)
- Coordinates: 49°02′42″N 2°33′06″E
- Country: France
- Region: Île-de-France
- Department: Val-d'Oise
- Arrondissement: Sarcelles
- Canton: Goussainville
- Intercommunality: CA Roissy Pays de France

Government
  - Mayor (2020–2026): Éric Plasmans
- Area^{1}: 4.58 km^{2} (1.77 sq mi)
- Population (2023): 282
  - Density: 61.6/km^{2} (159/sq mi)
- Time zone: UTC+01:00 (CET)
  - Summer (DST): UTC+02:00 (CEST)
- INSEE/Postal code: 95154 /95380
- ^{1} French Land Register data, which excludes lakes, ponds, glaciers > 1 km^{2} (0.386 sq mi or 247 acres) and river estuaries.

Chennevières-lès-Louvres (French pronunciation: [ʃɛnvjɛʁ lɛ luvʁ], literally Chennevières near Louvres) is a commune in the Val-d'Oise department in Île-de-France in northern France.

== See also ==
- Communes of the Val-d'Oise department
