= Lycée Léonard de Vinci (Saint-Witz) =

French school in St Witz (Val-d'Oise)

Lycée Léonard de Vinci is a senior high school/sixth-form college in Saint-Witz, Val-d'Oise, France, in the Paris metropolitan area.

As of 2016 it has about 600 students.
