= Survilliers =

- Commune
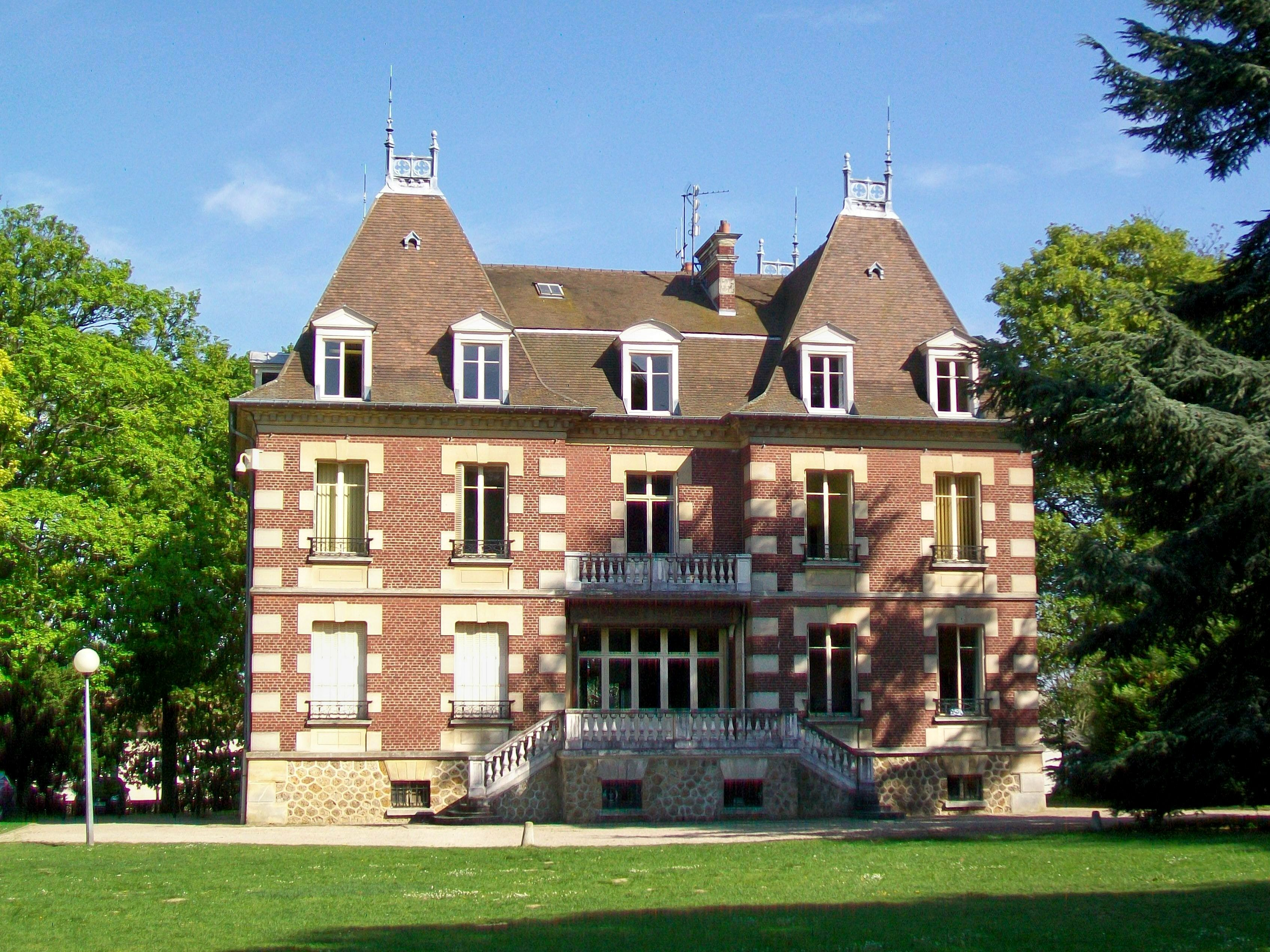
- The town hall of Survilliers
- Location of Survilliers
- Location within France Location within Île-de-France (region)
- Coordinates: 49°05′55″N 2°32′45″E
- Country: France
- Region: Île-de-France
- Department: Val-d'Oise
- Arrondissement: Sarcelles
- Canton: Goussainville
- Intercommunality: CA Roissy Pays de France

Government
  - Mayor (2020–2026): Adeline Roldao
- Area^{1}: 5.38 km^{2} (2.08 sq mi)
- Population (2023): 4,091
  - Density: 760/km^{2} (1,970/sq mi)
- Time zone: UTC+01:00 (CET)
  - Summer (DST): UTC+02:00 (CEST)
- INSEE/Postal code: 95604 /95470
- ^{1} French Land Register data, which excludes lakes, ponds, glaciers > 1 km^{2} (0.386 sq mi or 247 acres) and river estuaries.

Survilliers (French pronunciation: [syʁvilje]) is a commune in the Val-d'Oise department in Île-de-France in northern France.

== Population ==
Historical population
Year	Pop.	±% p.a.
1968	1,533	—
1975	2,727	+8.58%
1982	3,701	+4.46%
1990	3,661	−0.14%
1999	3,654	−0.02%
2007	3,710	+0.19%
2012	4,053	+1.78%
2017	4,171	+0.58%
2023	4,091	−0.32%
Source: INSEE

== See also ==
- Communes of the Val-d'Oise department
