= Louvres, Val-d'Oise =

Louvres
- Commune
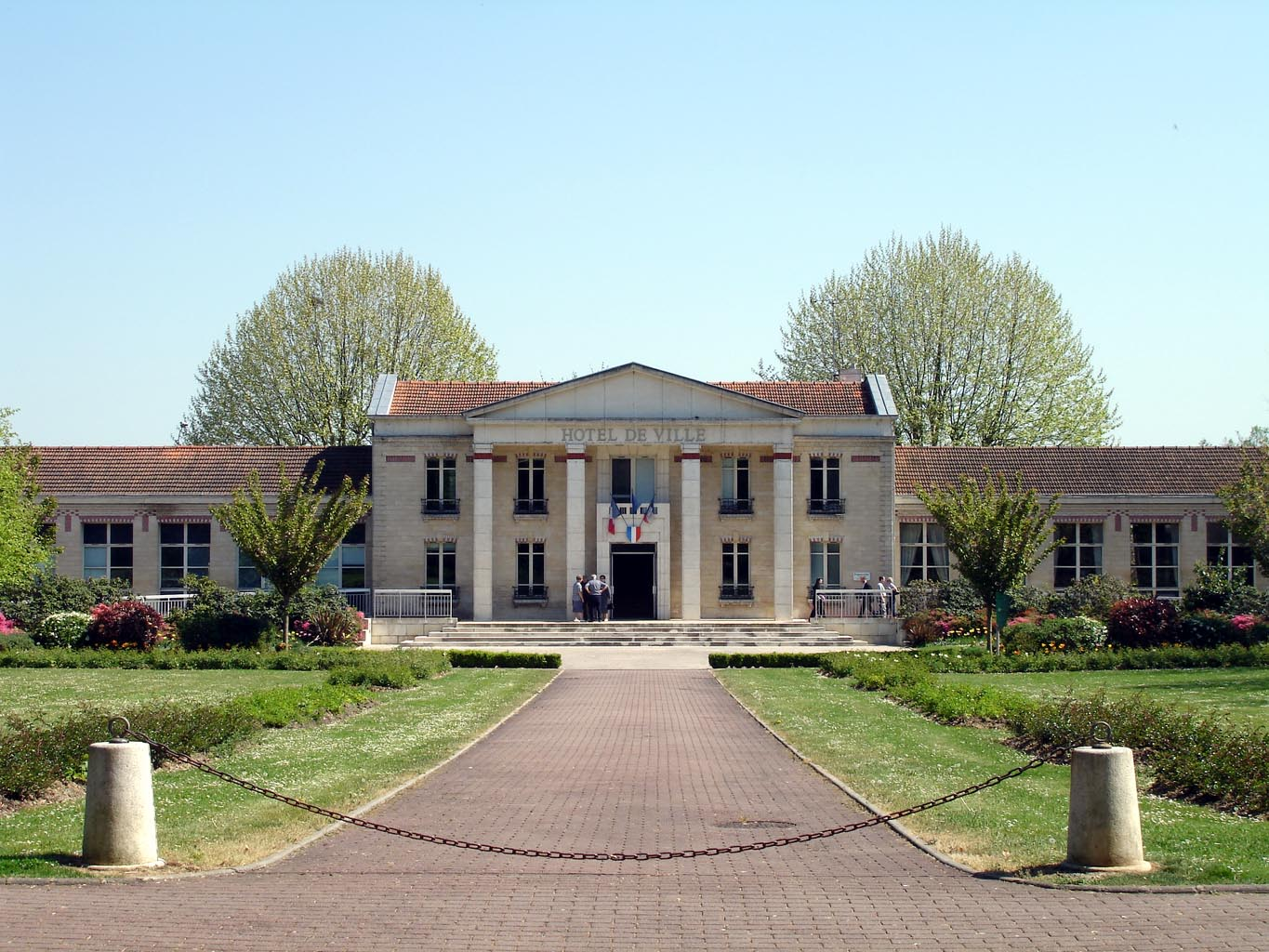
- The town hall of Louvres

- Coat of arms
- Location of Louvres
- Location within France Location within Île-de-France (region)
- Coordinates: 49°02′41″N 2°30′20″E
- Country: France
- Region: Île-de-France
- Department: Val-d'Oise
- Arrondissement: Sarcelles
- Canton: Goussainville
- Intercommunality: CA Roissy Pays de France

Government
  - Mayor (2020–2026): Eddy Thoreau
- Area^{1}: 11.33 km^{2} (4.37 sq mi)
- Population (2023): 12,560
  - Density: 1,109/km^{2} (2,871/sq mi)
- Time zone: UTC+01:00 (CET)
  - Summer (DST): UTC+02:00 (CEST)
- INSEE/Postal code: 95351 /95380
- ^{1} French Land Register data, which excludes lakes, ponds, glaciers > 1 km^{2} (0.386 sq mi or 247 acres) and river estuaries.

Louvres (French pronunciation: [luvʁ]) is a commune in the Val-d'Oise department in Île-de-France in northern France.

== Population ==
Historical population
Year	Pop.	±% p.a.
1968	3,355	—
1975	7,961	+13.14%
1982	7,385	−1.07%
1990	7,508	+0.21%
1999	8,797	+1.78%
2007	8,905	+0.15%
2012	9,767	+1.87%
2017	10,337	+1.14%
2023	12,560	+3.30%
Source: INSEE

== Education ==
Schools in Louvres include:

- Four preschools (écoles maternelles): Georges Seurat, du Moulin, du Bouteillier, and Delacroix
- Three elementary schools: du Moulin, du Boutellier, and de la Fontaine Sainte-Geneviève
- Two junior high schools: Collège André Malraux and Collège François Mauriac

Nearby senior high schools:

- Lycée René Cassin in Gonesse
- Lycée Léonard de Vinci in Saint-Witz
- Lycée Charles Baudelaire in Fosses

== Town partnerships ==
Louvres fosters partnerships with the following places:

- Bad Sobernheim, Rhineland-Palatinate, Germany

== See also ==
- Communes of the Val-d'Oise department
