= Vémars =

- Commune
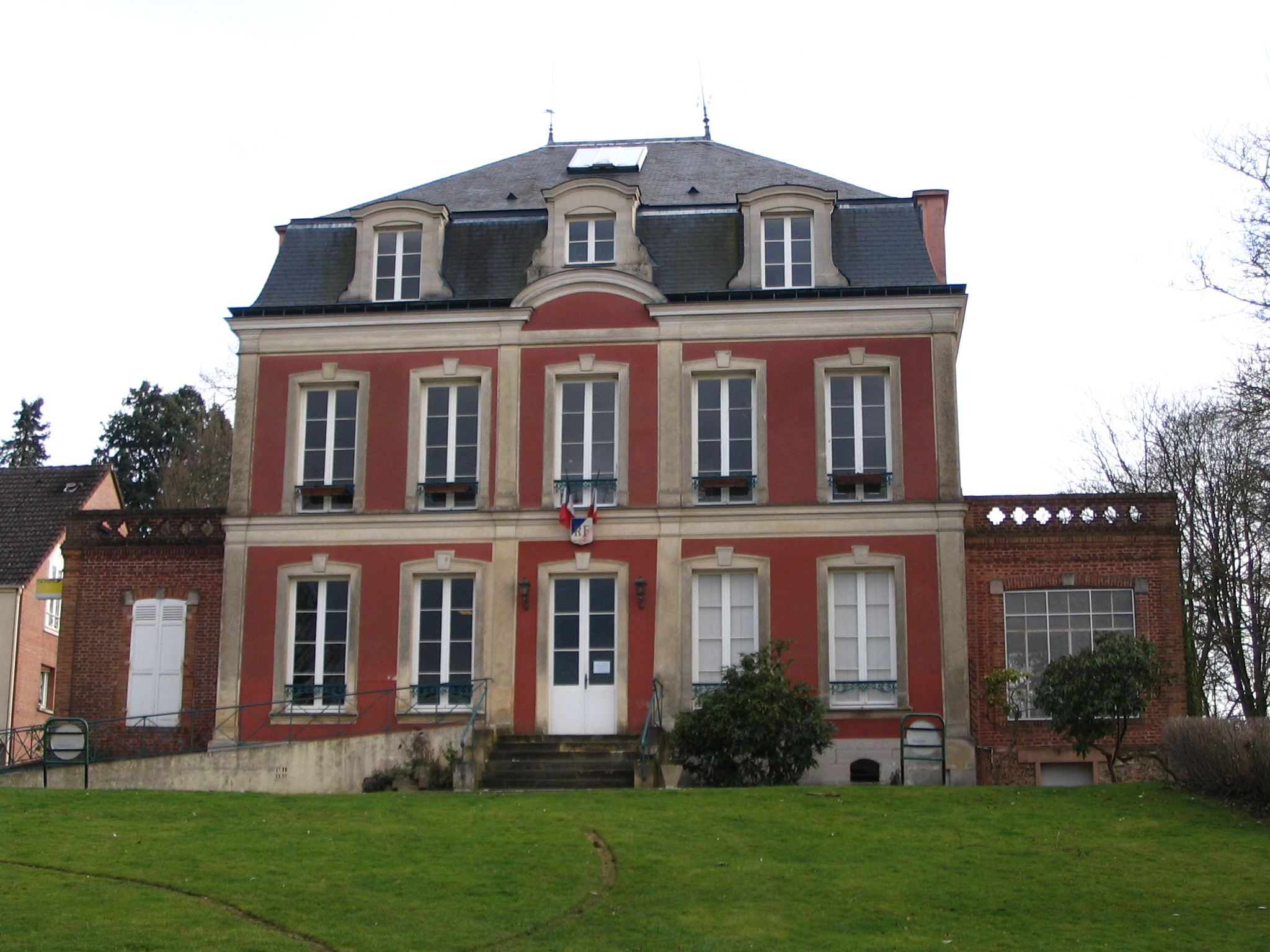
- Vémars town hall

- Coat of arms
- Location of Vémars
- Location within France Location within Île-de-France (region)
- Coordinates: 49°04′14″N 2°34′07″E
- Country: France
- Region: Île-de-France
- Department: Val-d'Oise
- Arrondissement: Sarcelles
- Canton: Goussainville
- Intercommunality: CA Roissy Pays de France

Government
  - Mayor (2020–2026): Frédéric Didier
- Area^{1}: 8.18 km^{2} (3.16 sq mi)
- Population (2023): 3,124
  - Density: 382/km^{2} (989/sq mi)
- Time zone: UTC+01:00 (CET)
  - Summer (DST): UTC+02:00 (CEST)
- INSEE/Postal code: 95641 /95470
- ^{1} French Land Register data, which excludes lakes, ponds, glaciers > 1 km^{2} (0.386 sq mi or 247 acres) and river estuaries.

Vémars (French pronunciation: [vemaʁ]) is a commune in the Val-d'Oise department and Île-de-France region of France.

== Population ==
Historical population
Year	Pop.	±% p.a.
1968	553	—
1975	844	+6.23%
1982	842	−0.03%
1990	2,099	+12.10%
1999	2,058	−0.22%
2007	2,030	−0.17%
2012	2,198	+1.60%
2017	2,471	+2.37%
2023	3,124	+3.99%
Source: INSEE

== See also ==
- Communes of the Val-d'Oise department
