= MI 79 =

Dual-voltage trainsets operated on the French RER B line

MI 79 (Class Z 8100)
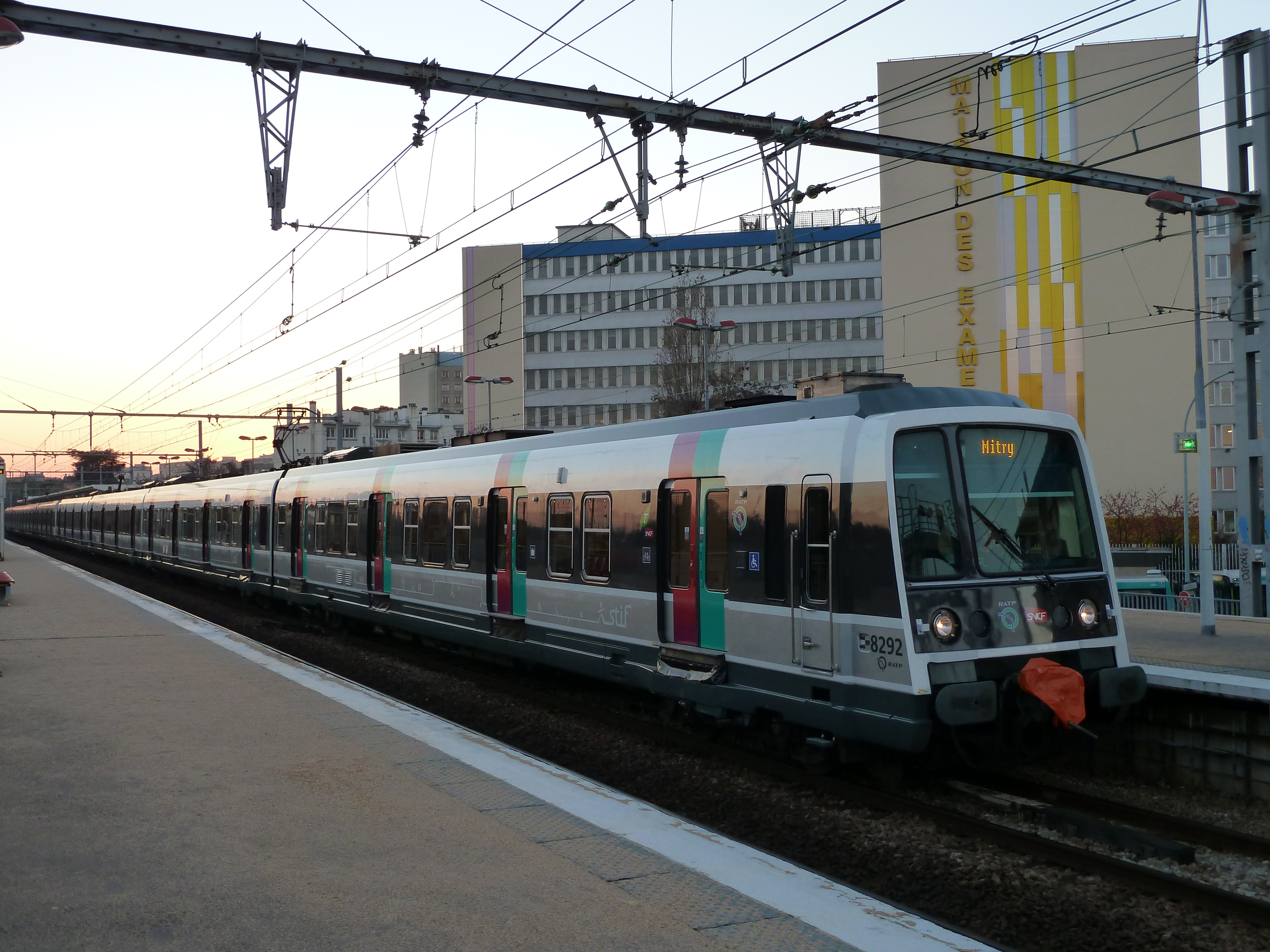
- MI 79 train at Laplace station on the RER B line.
- In service: 1981–present
- Manufacturers: Alsthom and Société Franco-Belge
- Constructed: 1980–1985
- Entered service: 1980
- Refurbished: 2010–2015
- Number built: 120 trainsets (480 cars)
- Number in service: 116 trainsets (464 cars)
- Number scrapped: 4 trainsets (16 cars)
- Formation: 4 cars per trainset
- Fleet numbers: Z 8101–Z 8340
- Operator: RATP
- Depots: Massy; Mitry-Mory
- Line served: RER RER B

Specifications
- Car body construction: Aluminium
- Train length: 104.16 m (341 ft 9 in)
- Car length: 26 m (85 ft 4 in)
- Width: 2.8 m (9 ft 2 in)
- Height: 4.18 m (13 ft 9 in)
- Doors: 4 pairs per side, per car
- Maximum speed: 140 km/h (87 mph)
- Weight: 205,600 kg (453,300 lb)
- Traction system: TCO chopper/thyristor (analogic control)
- Traction motors: 8 x CEM/Oerlikon EHO 3262 A (750 V DC self ventilated)
- Power output: 2,824–2,480 kW (3,787–3,326 hp)
- Transmission: Hollow shaft and cardan shaft ratio :4.047
- Acceleration: 1 m/s^{2} (3.3 ft/s^{2})
- Deceleration: 1.1 m/s^{2} (3.6 ft/s^{2}) (emergency brake) 1.15 m/s^{2} (3.8 ft/s^{2})
- Electric systems: Overhead line: 25 kV 50 Hz AC; 1,500 V DC
- Current collection: Pantograph (type AM 62 BU)
- Bogies: H-shape frame by ANF Industrie
- Braking systems: Disc, regenerative, eddy current
- Safety systems: EAS, KCVP, SACEM
- Coupling system: Scharfenberg
- Multiple working: MI 79 or MI 84 maximum 3 trainsets
- Track gauge: 1,435 mm (4 ft 8 1/2 in) standard gauge

The MI 79 (French: Matériel d'Interconnexion de 1979, English: 1979 stock interconnecting set), also known as the Class Z 8100, is a dual-voltage electric multiple unit trainset that is operated on line B of the Réseau Express Régional (RER), a hybrid suburban commuter and rapid transit system serving Paris and its suburbs. The MI 79, designed in the 1970s for the RER B which needed dual-voltage (interconnection) trainsets. They were followed by a derivative version, the MI 84, designed in the 1980s to meet the needs of the RER A line, before reassigned to the RER B in the 2010s.

== History ==
In the early 1970s, work was underway to create the Réseau Express Régional (RER), a hybrid suburban commuter and rapid transit system serving Paris and its suburbs. The RER B line would be created by connecting two existing lines with a new tunnel that would run from north to south through the heart of Paris.

This proposed line presented some complications. The Ligne de Sceaux to south of Paris, owned by RATP, had 1.5 kV DC electrification and platforms at a height of 105 cm (41 in), while the Chemins de fer du Nord to the north of Paris, owned by SNCF had 25 kV AC electrification and platforms at a height of 55 cm (22 in).

The solution was a train capable of using both electrification networks ("interconnecting") with a pneumatically controlled exterior step that would stay at floor height at high platform stations and would be automatically lowered when entering low platform stations. The MI 79 would be formed as four-car trainsets with a total length of 104 m (341 ft) which would allow two trainsets in multiple working to perfectly fit at the shortest platforms on the line which were 208 m (682 ft) long.

As the SNCF and RATP would jointly operate the RER B, the agencies also jointly ordered the MI 79. The contract to build the trainsets was awarded in 1979 to Alsthom and Société Franco-Belge (which would be acquired by Alsthom in 1982, before the completion of the order). The initial order, called the MI 79A, would be for a total of 72 four-car trainsets: 31 to be purchased by RATP and 51 to be purchased by SNCF. The first trainsets were rapidly assembled and the first trainsets arrived for testing in 1980. The RATP made an order for 38 additional trainsets to be called the MI 79B which incorporated several improvements, including simplification of the coupler system, changes to the brake control system, and simplification of door controls. All of the trainsets would be delivered by 1985.

Although the trains were needed to enable the interconnection of the RER B, technical issues with the MS 61, forced RATP to transfer 24 MI 79 trainsets from the RER B to the RER A to make up for a shortfall in equipment. An issue with the MI 79 was discovered during a cold wave in 1985–86, electrical components and motors did not have enough insulation. The retirement of the Z 23000 railcars dating from 1938 was postponed to make up for the shortfall in equipment caused by MI 79 trainsets sidelined with frost issues.

A trainset was damaged in the 1995 France bombings and another was damaged in the 1996 Paris RER bombing. The undamaged trailer and motor cars from these sets were later combined.

The MI 79 trainsets underwent a major refurbishment project between 2010 and 2015 at a cost of €275 million.

== Design ==
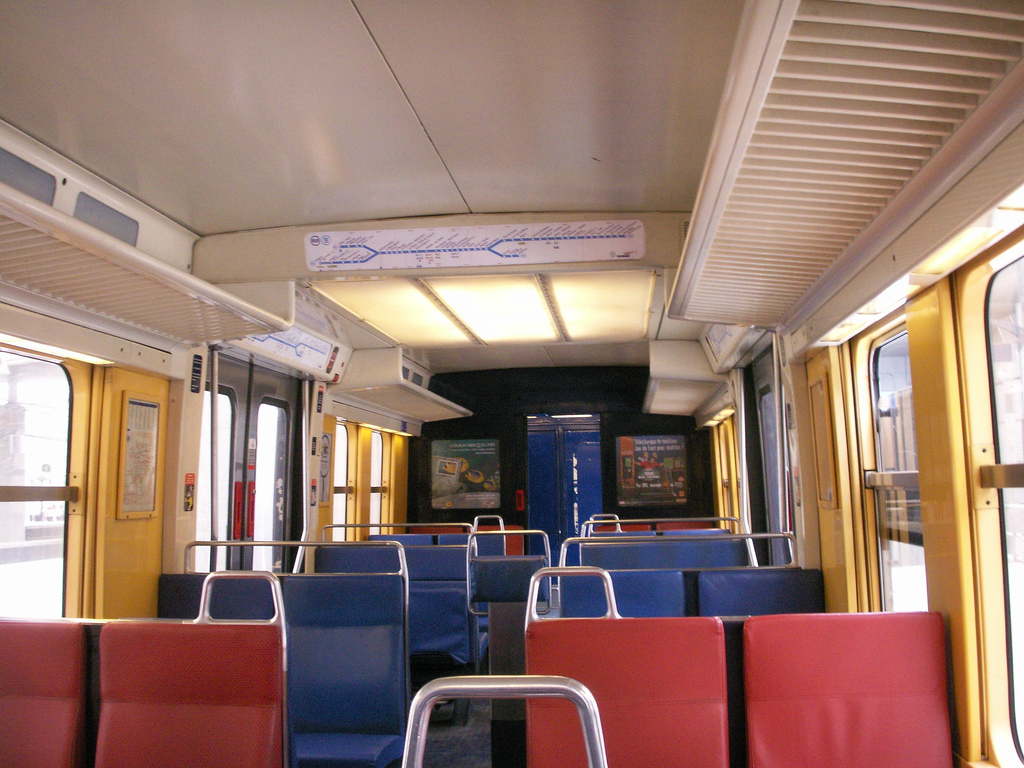
Original MI 79 interior

As delivered, the MI 79 had an interior design in keeping with the aesthetics of the time, including red and blue vinyl seats, cream-colored ceilings, yellow side walls, and dark blue end walls. Also, because the RER B would serve Charles de Gaulle Airport, trains were equipped with luggage racks above the seats.

One of the design choices that would later present a problem was the flip-down seats near the entry doors. When in use, they obstruct part of the entryway, leaving a space only 40 centimetres (16 in) wide for passengers to board or disembark.

The trainsets are light for their size and era of construction thanks to the use of aluminum for the body. Each four-car trainset is equipped with eight motors (one on motor per axle on the power cars) developing a total of 2,480 kW (3,330 hp) under DC power and 2,824 kW (3,787 hp) under AC power. That combination of low weight and high power allows the MI 79 to fully depart from a 208-meter platform in 23 seconds and reaching their 140 km/h (87 mph) top speed in 100 seconds.

=== Technical details ===
Each MI 79 trainset is made up of four cars with two motorized cars flanking two non-powered trailer cars. Because the pantograph is located on the trailer car, each motorized car and trailer car are like a married pair, and together act as an independent half-trainset.

Each motorized car has four motors (two per bogie) manufactured for Alstom by a joint venture of CEM and Oerlikon. Designated the EHO 3262 A, these direct current (DC) motors are cooled by air and each develops 310 kW (420 hp). They are positioned suspended on the bogie frame. The power control system uses an analog TCO chopper with thyristors. When overhead lines supply AC power, a rectifier is used to convert the power into DC.

The braking system includes disc, dynamic, and eddy current brakes. When the train is being supplied DC power, the dynamic brakes are regenerative, returning power to the overhead lines. Under AC, the dynamic brakes are rheostatic, with the power dissipated as heat in the brake grid resistors.

== Fleet ==
The MI 79 fleet consists of 116 trainsets. All are in service on RER Line B and assigned to the RATP depots at Massy and Mitry.

Each trainset follows a 2M2T formation (two powered cars and two non-powered trailers):

RER B	← Aéroport Charles de Gaulle/Mitry–Claye Robinson/Saint-Rémy-lès-Chevreuse →			
Car No.	1	> 2	3 <	4
Type	Motor	Trailer	Trailer	Motor
Numbering	ZBD 8102–8340 (even number)	ZRAB 28102–28340 (even number)	ZRB 28101–28339 (odd number)	ZBD 8101–8339 (odd number)

Cars 2 and 3 are equipped with type AM 62 BU pantographs, denoted with < and > in the chart above . Car 2 was formerly a mixed 1st and 2nd class car.

== Refurbishment ==
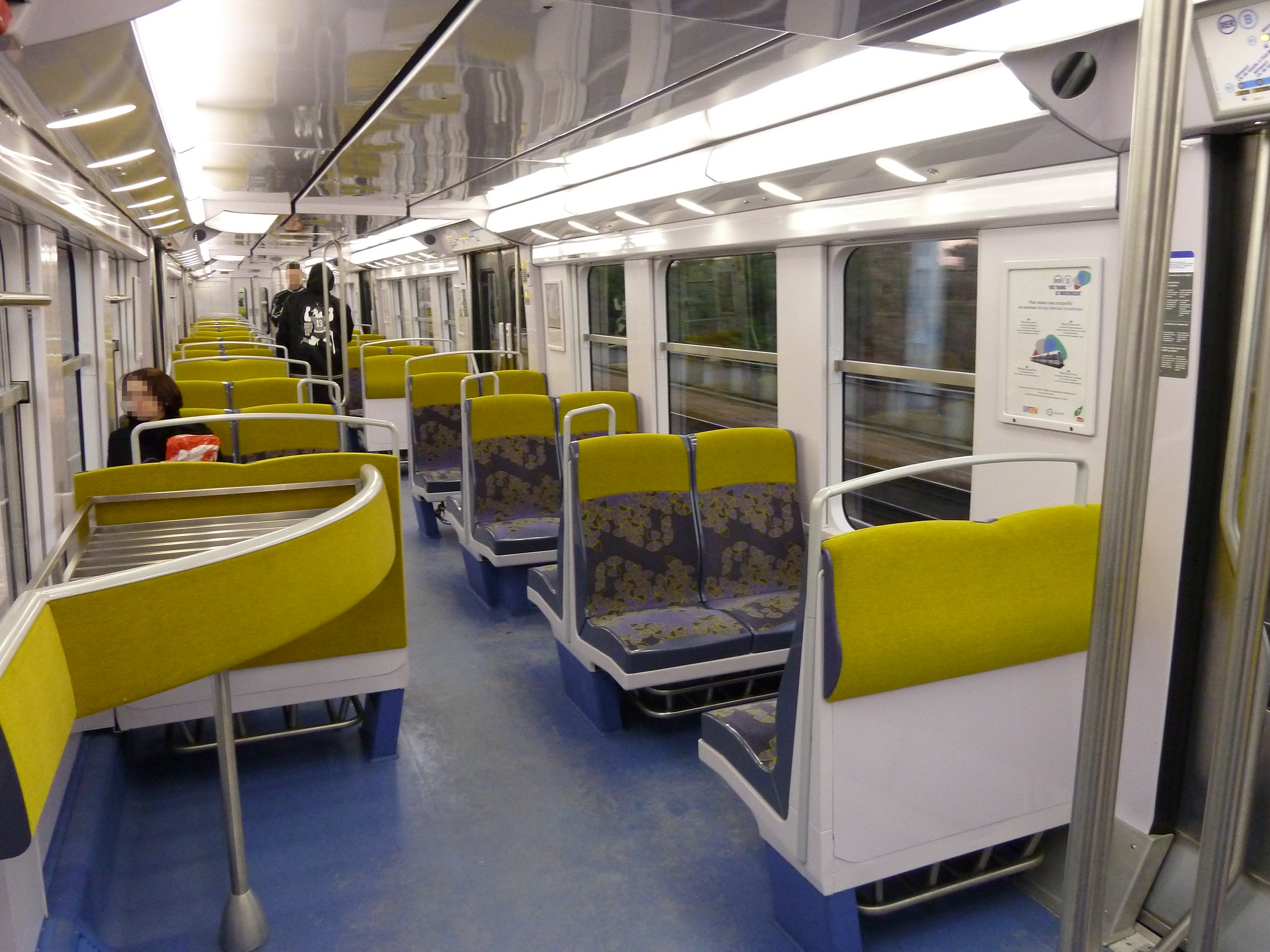
Refurbished MI 79 interior, showing luggage rack (left) and lean bars by doors

A significant renovation of both interior and exterior of 119 MI 79 trains of the RER B took place between 2010 and 2015. The €274.75 million project included a technical update, installation of refrigerated ventilation, and changes to the interior layout of the cars. The refurbishment program is expected to extend the life of the trainsets for 15 to 20 years.

After a prototype renovation by Alstom at their site in Reichshoffen, the remaining renovations are carried out in the RATP workshops in Sucy-en-Brie. At the end of 2013, 58 trainsets had been renovated, 75 in mid-2014, 100 in June 2015 and the last in December 2015.

In September 2011, an investigation detected asbestos residue in the newly refurbished trainsets. Of the 60 cars that were inspected, 32 to 36 contained asbestos. These trainsets were withdrawn from service, reducing the number of trains on the line by 20%.

The interior layout of the cars was revised during the refurbishment. One major change was the elimination of the overhead luggage shelves which prevented heating and ventilation ducts from being installed on the ceiling of the cars and were only lightly used by passengers. Instead, a block of four seats was removed to add a luggage rack near the doors. The problematic flip down seats by the doors were also removed and replaced with lean bars.

The interior also received better lighting, more grab bars for standing passengers, and saw the elimination of interior dividers. A passenger information system (SISVE) was also installed, which provides audio announcements and visual display of the trains next stop with available connections.

== Gallery ==
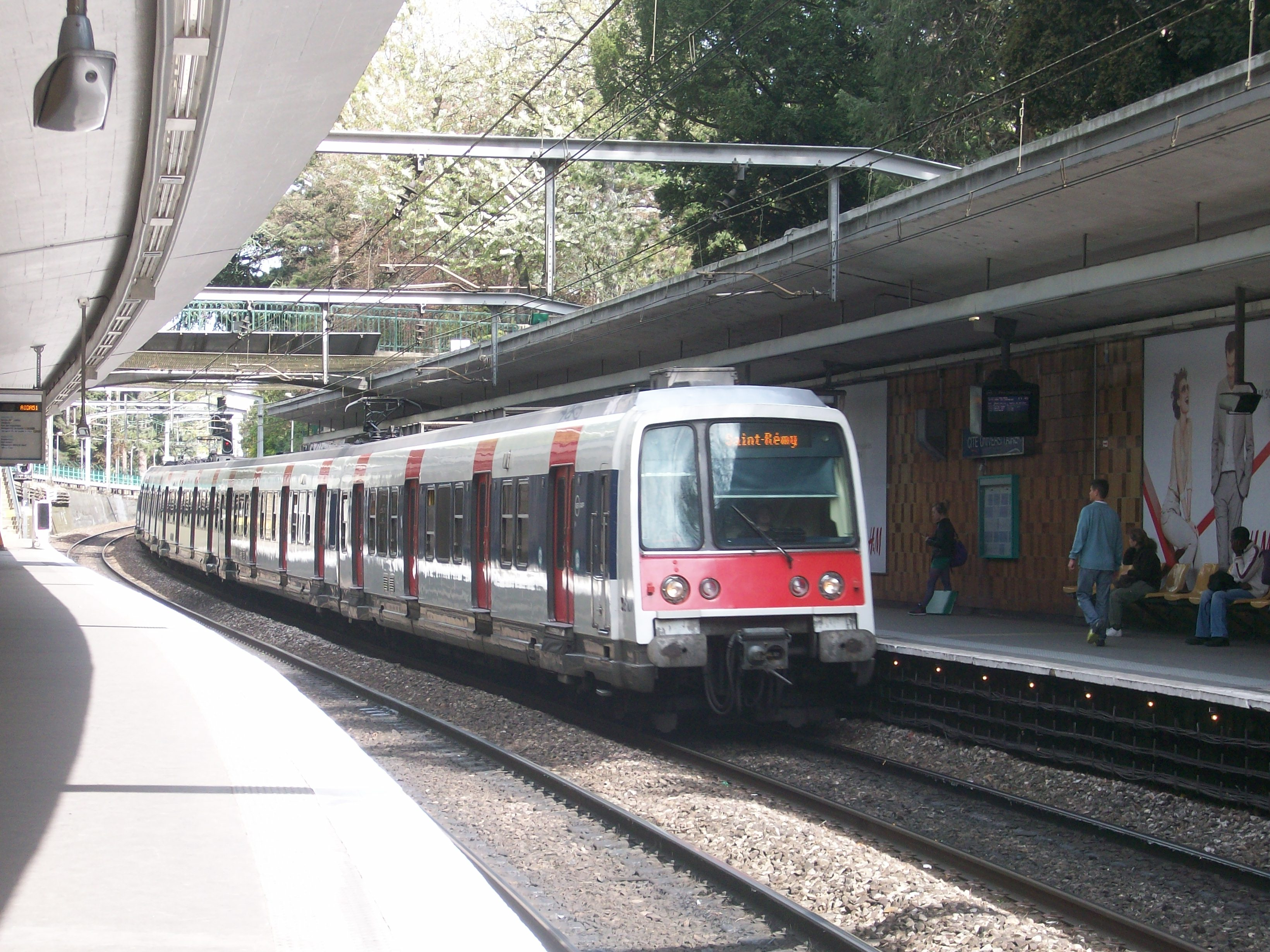
MI 79 in original "Île-de-France" livery at Cité Universitaire station

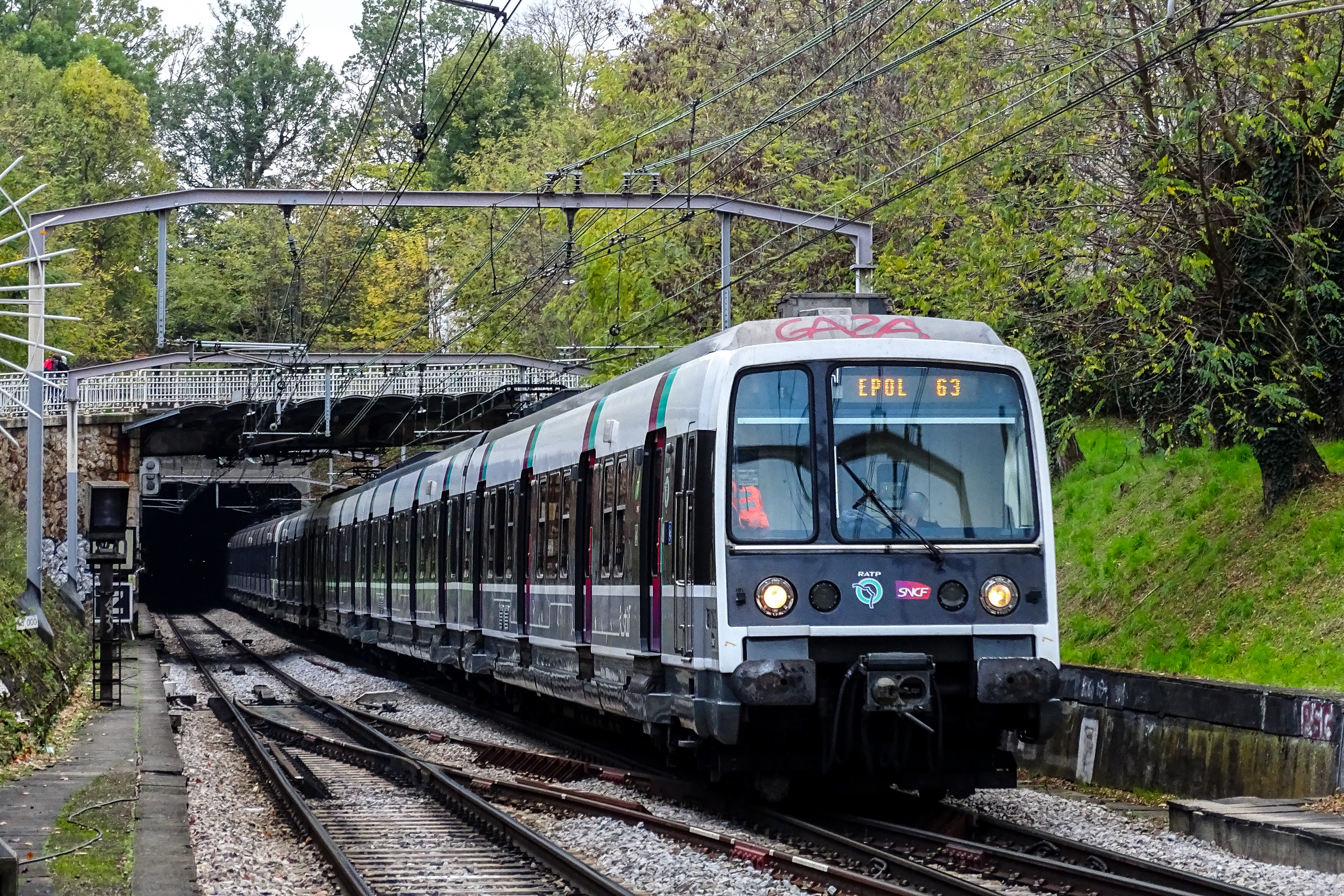
Refurbished MI 79 in new STIF/RATP/SNCF livery

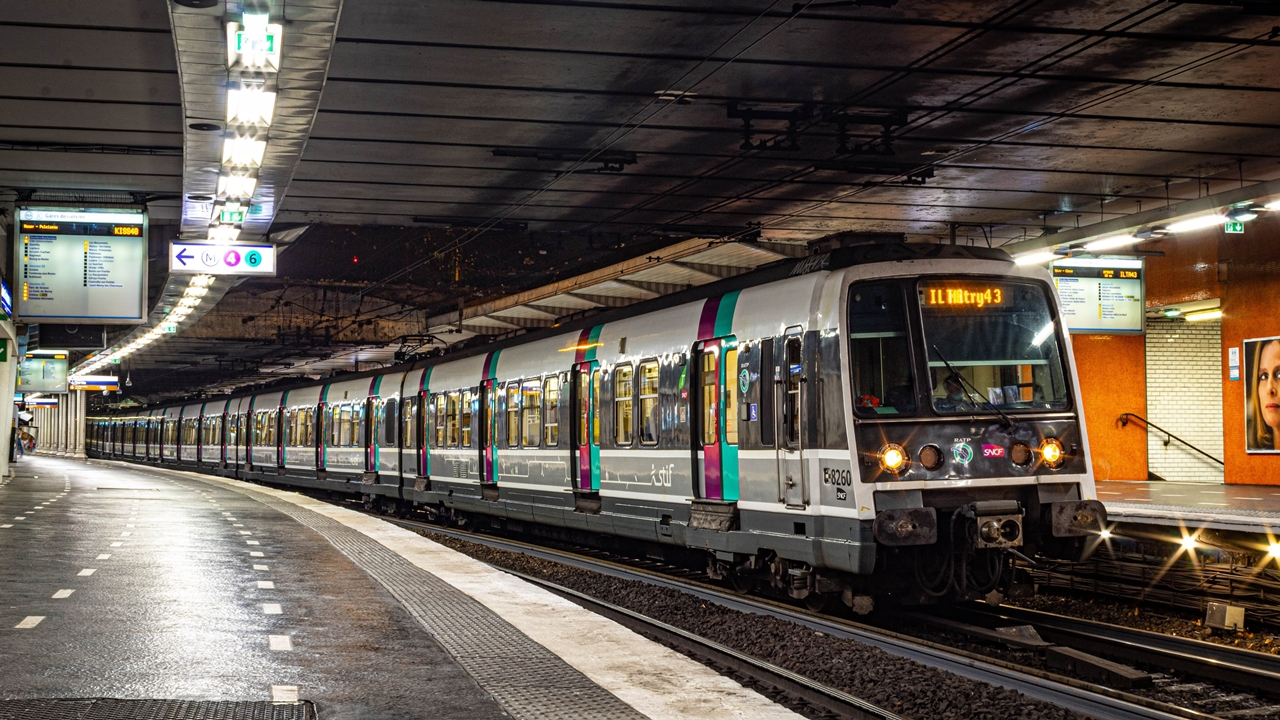
Refurbished MI 79 underground at Denfert-Rochereau station

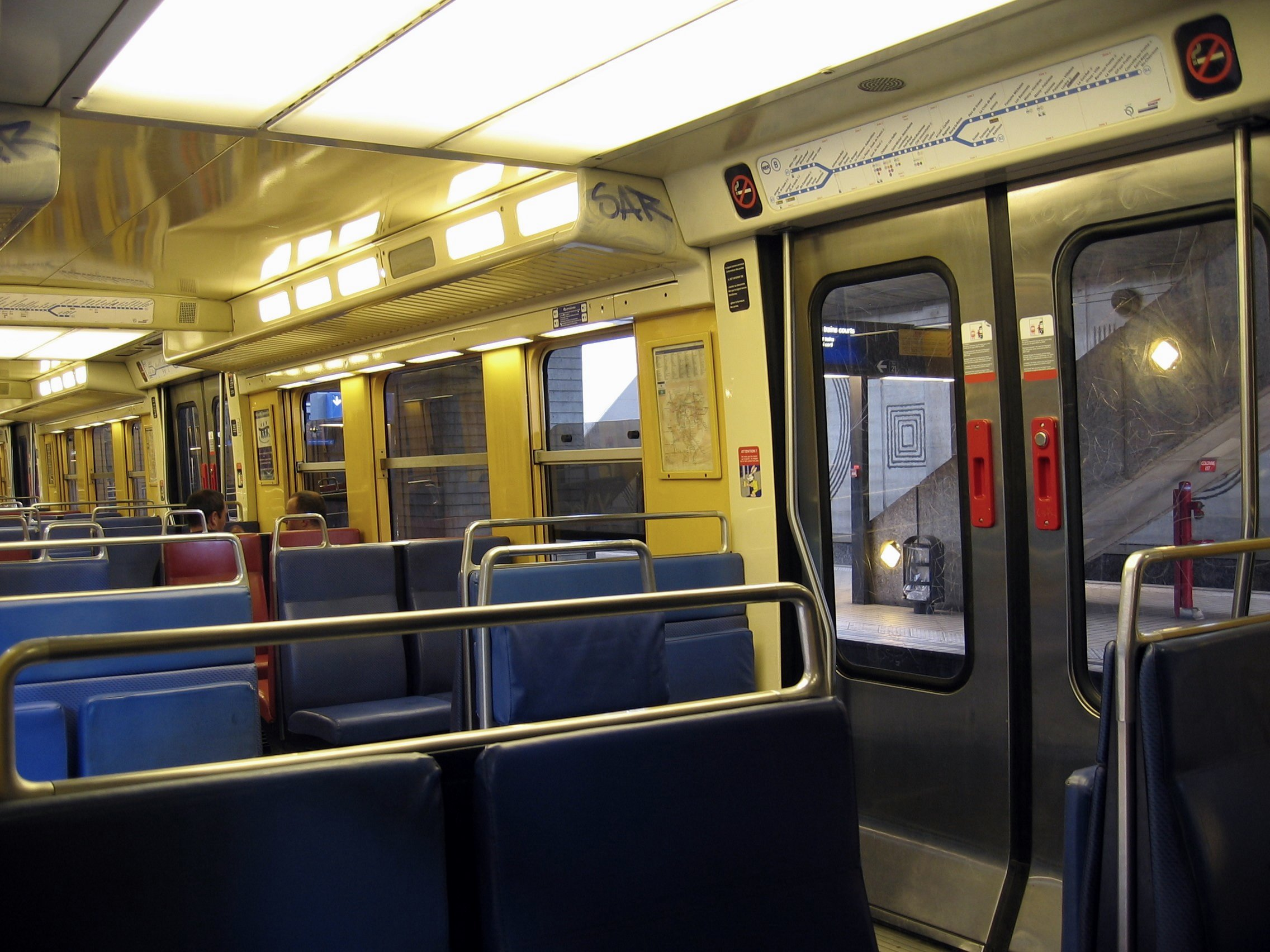
Original MI 79 interior showing flip-down seats by doors

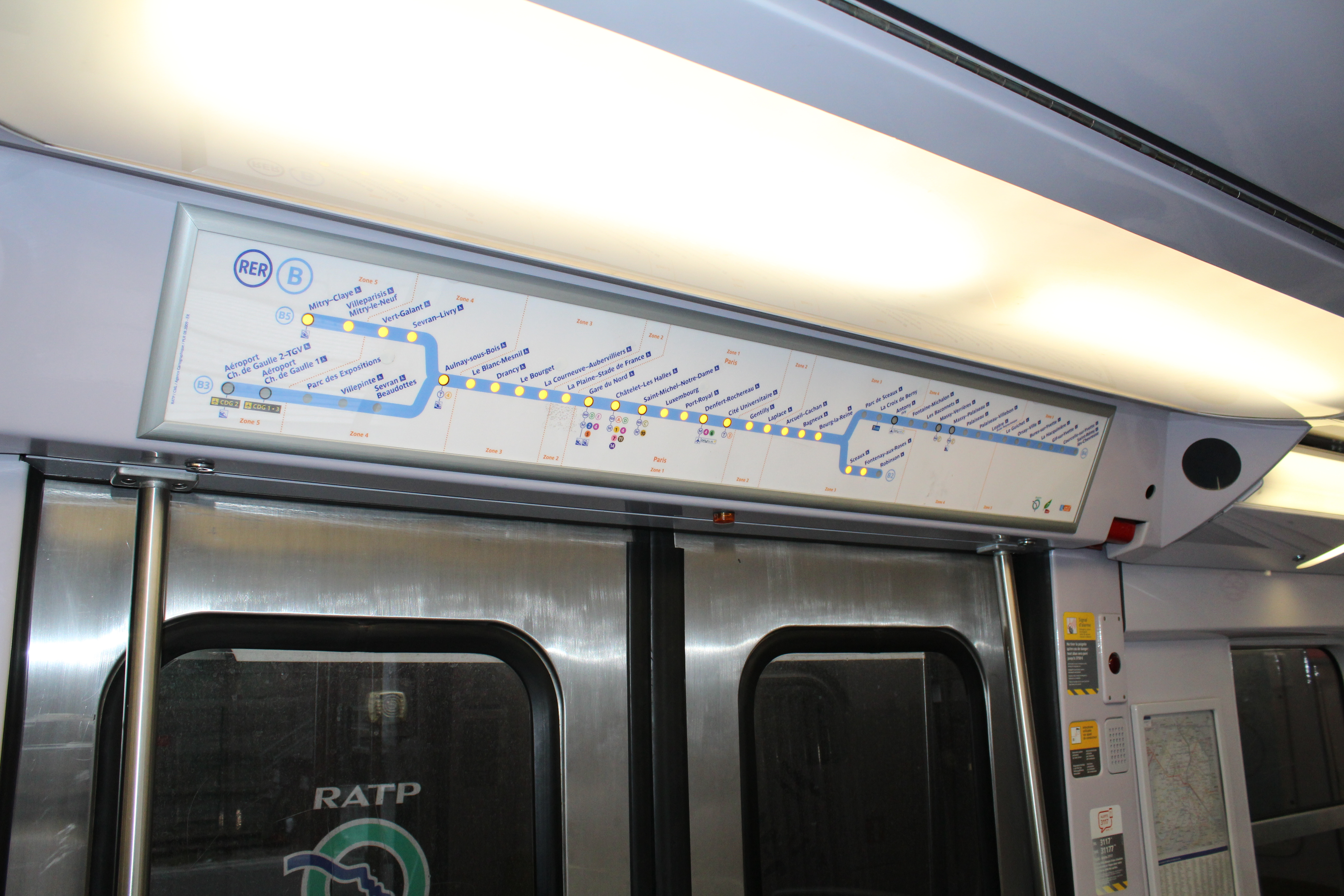
MI 79 interior showing the SISVE lighted route map
