= MI 84 =

Dual-voltage trainsets operated on the French RER B line

MI 84 (Class Z 8100)
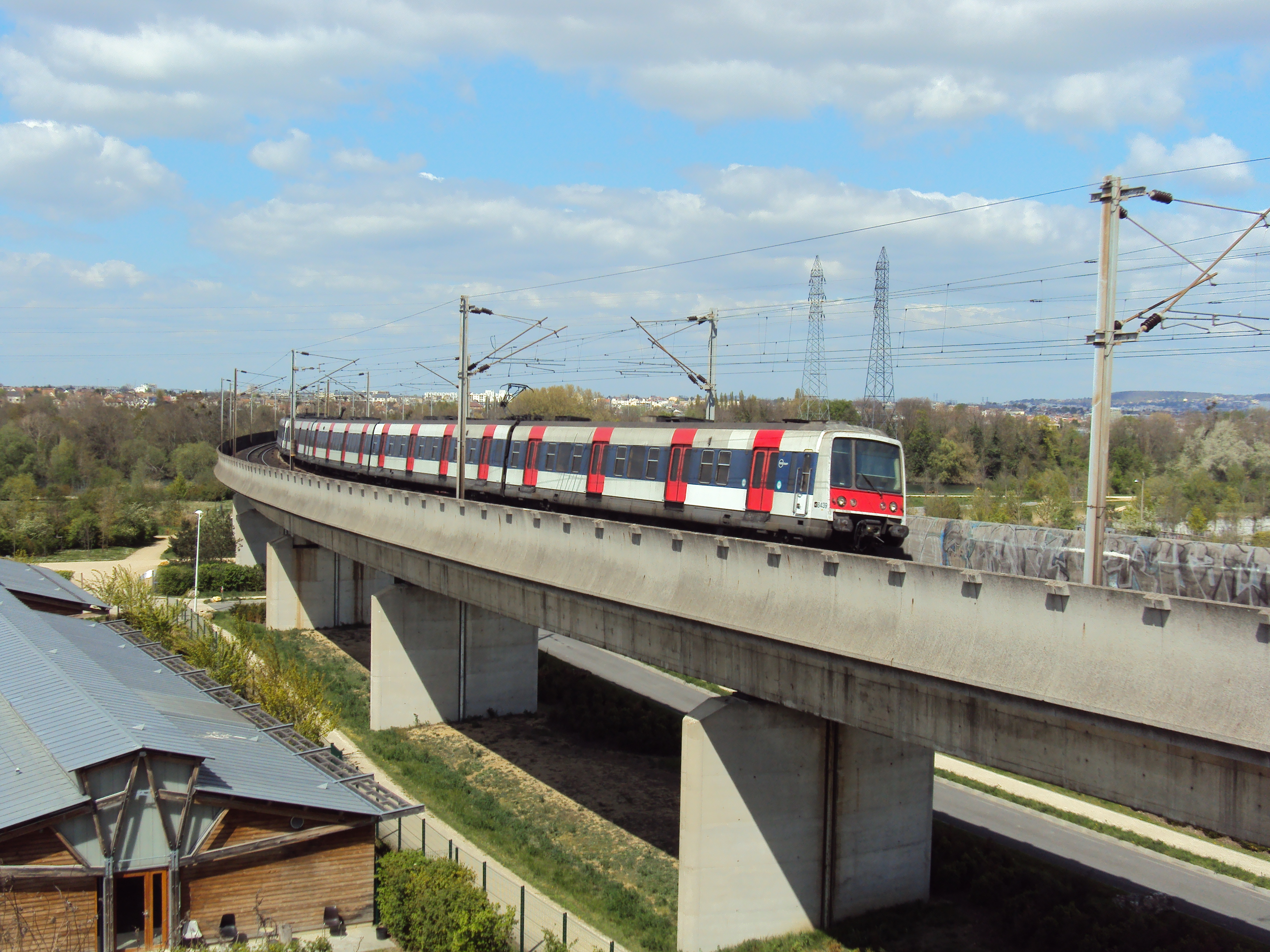
- A MI 84 on line A in 2012
- In service: 1984–present
- Manufacturers: Alstom and ANF
- Constructed: 1984–1989
- Refurbished: 2018–present
- Number built: 73 trainsets (292 cars)
- Number in service: 41 trainsets (164 cars) (as of Dec 2020)
- Number scrapped: 32 trainsets (128 cars)
- Formation: 4 cars per trainset
- Fleet numbers: Z 8341– Z 8486
- Operators: RATP, SNCF
- Depot: Massy
- Lines served: (1984–2017) (1984–present)

Specifications
- Car body construction: Aluminium
- Train length: 104.16 m (341 ft 9 in)
- Car length: 26 m (85 ft 4 in)
- Width: 2.8 m (9 ft 2 in)
- Height: 4.18 m (13 ft 9 in)
- Doors: 4 pairs per side, per car
- Maximum speed: 120 km/h (75 mph)
- Weight: 205,000 kg (452,000 lb)
- Traction system: Mi84A : Alstom Chopper/thyristor (digital control); Mi84B : Alstom four quadrant chopper with thyristors GTO
- Traction motors: EHO 3262 A (750 V DC self ventilated)
- Power output: 2,824 kW (3,787 hp)
- Transmission: hollow shaft and cardan shaft ratio :4.047
- Acceleration: 2.3 mph/s (1.0 m/s2)
- Deceleration: 2.5 mph/s (1.10 m/s²) (full service) 2.8 mph/s (1.20 m/s²) (emergency brake)
- Electric systems: Overhead line: 25 kV 50 Hz AC; 1,500 V DC
- Current collection: Pantograph (type AM 62 BU)
- Bogies: H-shape frame by ANF
- Braking systems: Disc and regenerative, eddy current
- Safety systems: EAS, KCVP, KCVB, SACEM
- Coupling system: Scharfenberg type
- Multiple working: MI 79 or MI 84, maximum 3 trainsets (2 in operations)
- Track gauge: 1,435 mm (4 ft 8 1/2 in) standard gauge

The MI 84 (French: Matériel d'Interconnexion de 1984, English: interconnection rolling stock of 1984), also known as the Class Z 8100, is a dual-voltage electric multiple unit trainset that is operated on line B of the Réseau Express Régional (RER), a hybrid suburban commuter and rapid transit system serving Paris and its Île-de-France suburbs.

The 73 four-car trains were built by a consortium of French manufacturers Alstom and ANF Industrie (which would be purchased by Bombardier in 1989 before the end of the deliveries). The final assembly of the trains was performed at Alstom's Valenciennes factory and ANF's Crespin factory between 1985 and 1990.

The design of the MI 84 was derived from the earlier MI 79 built for the RER B, but with modifications to make it better suited for the RER A line. The introduction of double-decker trainsets on the RER A allowed the MI 84 trains to be shifted to the RER B by 24 February 2017.

== History ==
In the late 1980s, the RER A was being extended west of Paris onto tracks that were part of the existing SNCF network, with the Cergy branch opening in 1988 and the Poissy branch opening in 1989. These tracks were powered with 25 kV AC traction power, not the 1.5 kV DC used on RATP's existing tracks. This required new equipment, capable of operating on both networks (interconnecting). The existing MS 61 equipment was only capable of operating under 1.5 kV DC and the RER A rolling stock fleet was in need of expansion after earlier extensions to the east of Paris.

To meet the need, in 1984 RATP purchased the MI 84 (French: Matériel d'Interconnexion de 1984, English: interconnection rolling stock of 1984) based on the earlier MI 79 which was still in production.

The MI 84 would prove to be somewhat problematic on the RER A line. Two trainsets coupled together were only 208 m (682 ft 5 in) long, compared to three MS 61 trainsets which could be up to 220 m (721 ft 9 in) long. As the only equipment capable of serving the Cergy and Poissy branches, the MI 84 trainsets also received intense usage.

Between 1990 and 2005, ridership on the RER A was growing at an average of 9% per year, leaving RATP looking for ways to increase capacity on the line. In 1997, the agency introduced the MI 2N Altéo, a double-deck, dual-voltage trainset. The double-deck trains proved so successful and popular, all remaining single-level trainsets were replaced with another order of double-deckers, the MI 09.

After the purchase of the double-deck equipment, the MI 84 trainsets were reassigned to the RER B which needed additional equipment to handle increasing passenger traffic.

As of 2020, all of the MI 84 trainsets are on the RER B, stored in good condition at Torcy or scrapped.

== Design ==
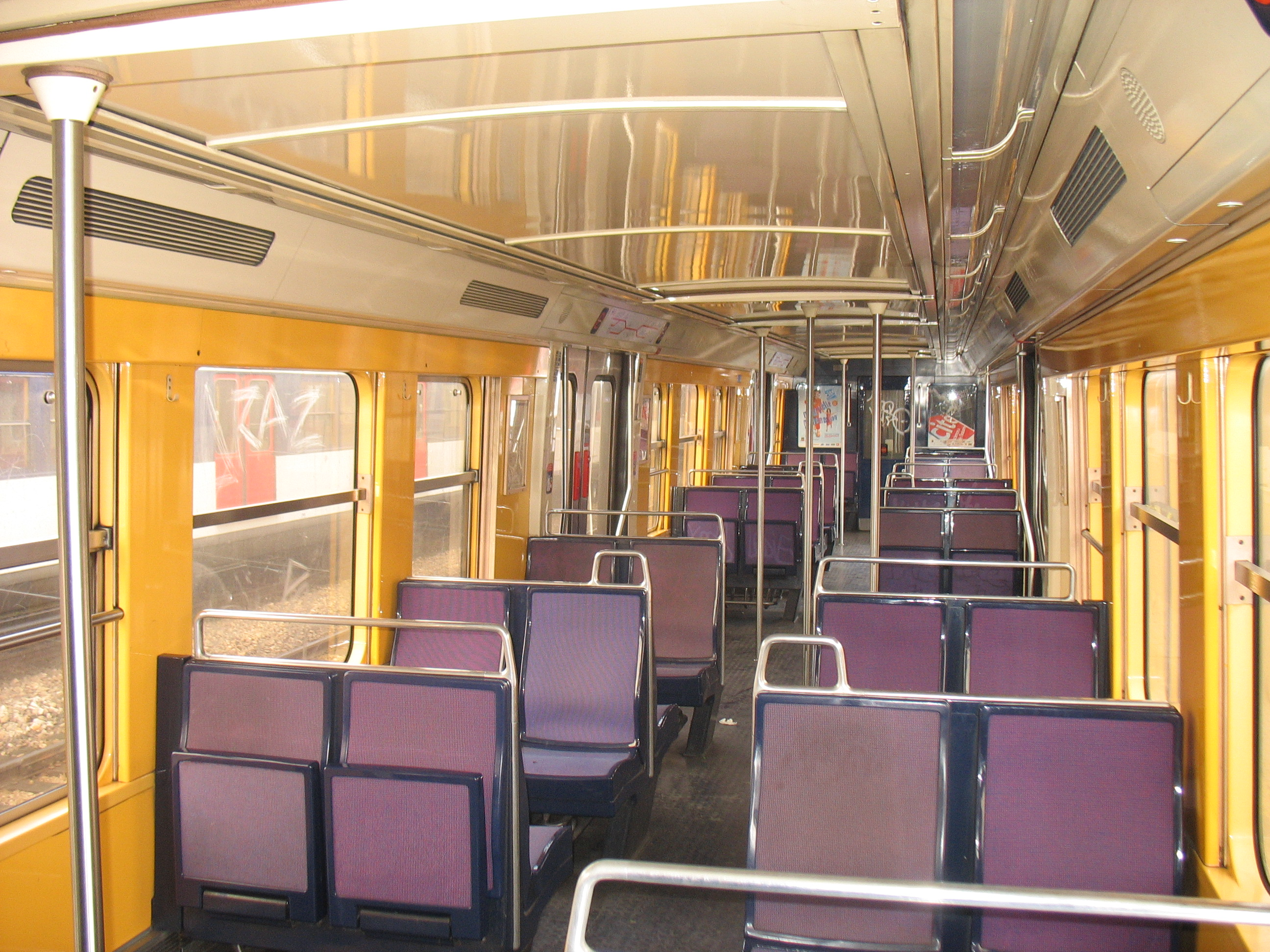
Original interior of the MI 84

The original interior of the MI 84 is similar to that of the original MI 79, with some differences.

Because the RER B serves Charles de Gaulle Airport, the MI 79 trains were equipped with overhead luggage racks. Because the RER A mostly serves suburban commuters, the luggage racks were eliminated on the MI 84, which also allowed heating and ventilation ducts to be moved to the ceiling (a less expensive design) and different lighting to be installed.

To accommodate the heavier passenger traffic on the RER A, the MI 84 had about 15% fewer seats, allowing more standing passengers. MI 84 trains are also equipped with anti-laceration seats which are more durable, but less comfortable than the thick leatherette seats of the MI 79.

By choosing to base the design of the MI 84 on the earlier MI 79, RATP enjoyed a lower initial purchase cost and by sharing many parts between the two models long-term maintenance costs were reduced. However, RATP did opt to make some mechanical changes to the MI 84 to take advantage of recent technological progress. The MI 84 uses microprocessors to control the propulsion systems (compared to the analog controls on the MI 79), simpler traction motors (the same as the SNCF Z2N trains) that were capable of "self-excitation" and adds a coolant system to remove heat from the chopper thyristors (the MI 79 used air cooling). Despite the changes, the MI 84 is still capable of being coupled and operated together with a MI 79 trainset.

=== Technical details ===
The MI 84 takes advantage of the technological advancement that had occurred since the construction of the MI 79 series. However, the MI 84 had to keep the same basic mechanical and electrical structure so they could be coupled to the MI 79.

Both the MI 84 and MI 79 use the same EHO 3262 A direct current (DC) motors. Two are installed per bogies and each develops 390 kW (520 hp).

The control system is the one that has benefited the most from the improvements. The MI 79 used analog TCO air-cooled chopper with thyristors. The MI 84 uses a digitally controlled, liquid-cooled chopper with thyristors. Early models were built by TCO and later units were built by Alstom and use four quadrant chopper with GTO components .

There is a self-excitation of the traction motors in the energy recovery phase. Simplification and reduction of the power of the static converter of the train (from 95 kVA to 30 kVA), made possible in particular by the "self-excitation" of the traction motors in the recovery phase.

The H-shape frame bogies with end sill are the same as the MI 79, manufactured by ANF. Transmission is via a hollow shaft around the axle as MI 79.

The braking system is also identical with disc, dynamic, and eddy current brakes. Although, unlike the MI 79, the dynamic brakes are not rheostatic.

== Fleet ==
The MI 84 fleet consists of 45 trainsets. Most are in service on RER Line B and assigned to the RATP depot at Massy. Additionally, some are stored in good condition at the Torcy RATP depot.

Each trainset follows a 2M2T formation (two powered cars and two non-powered trailers):

RER B	← Aéroport Charles de Gaulle/Mitry–Claye Robinson/Saint-Rémy-lès-Chevreuse →			
Car No.	1	> 2	3 <	4
Type	Motor	Trailer	Trailer	Motor
Numbering	ZBD 8342–8486 (even number)	ZRAB 28342–28486 (even number)	ZRB 28341–28485 (odd number)	ZBD 8341–8485 (odd number)

Cars 2 and 3 are equipped with type AM 62 BU pantographs, denoted with < and > in the chart. Car 2 was formerly a mixed 1st and 2nd class car.

=== Refurbishment ===
The introduction of the MI 09 series of double-decker trainsets on the RER A allowed RATP to shift the MI 84 trains to the RER B by 24 February 2017. By this time, the MI 84 trains were worn out after two decades of intensive use on the RER A and needed a refurbishment.

In 2018, Île-de-France Mobilités approved a €100 million contract with Alstom (the original builder of the trains) to refurbish 33 of the MI 84 trains. The refurbishment will add a cooled air ventilation system, security cameras and LED lighting. New seats and flooring will also be added that will create an interior that appears similar to the refurbished MI 79 trains. RATP believes the refurbishment will make the MI 84 trains more reliable and will enable more regular service on the RER B.

The first refurbished train was placed into service on 7 October 2020 and Alstom plans to finish the refurbishment of all 33 trains by 2022.

Sound of a Mi 84B arrival and departure from exterior at Chatelet les Halles

== Gallery ==
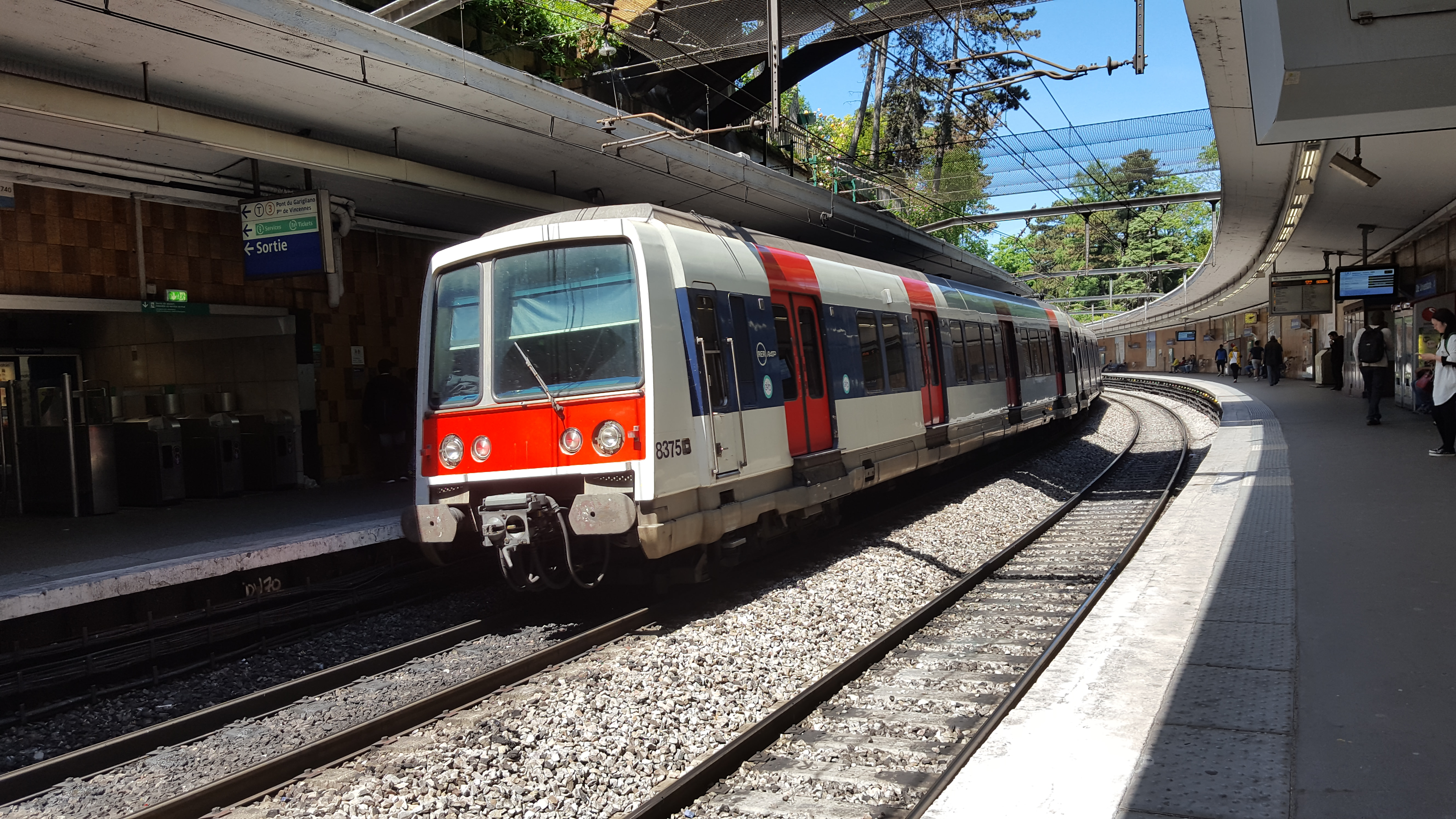
Mi84 at Cité universitaire on B Line

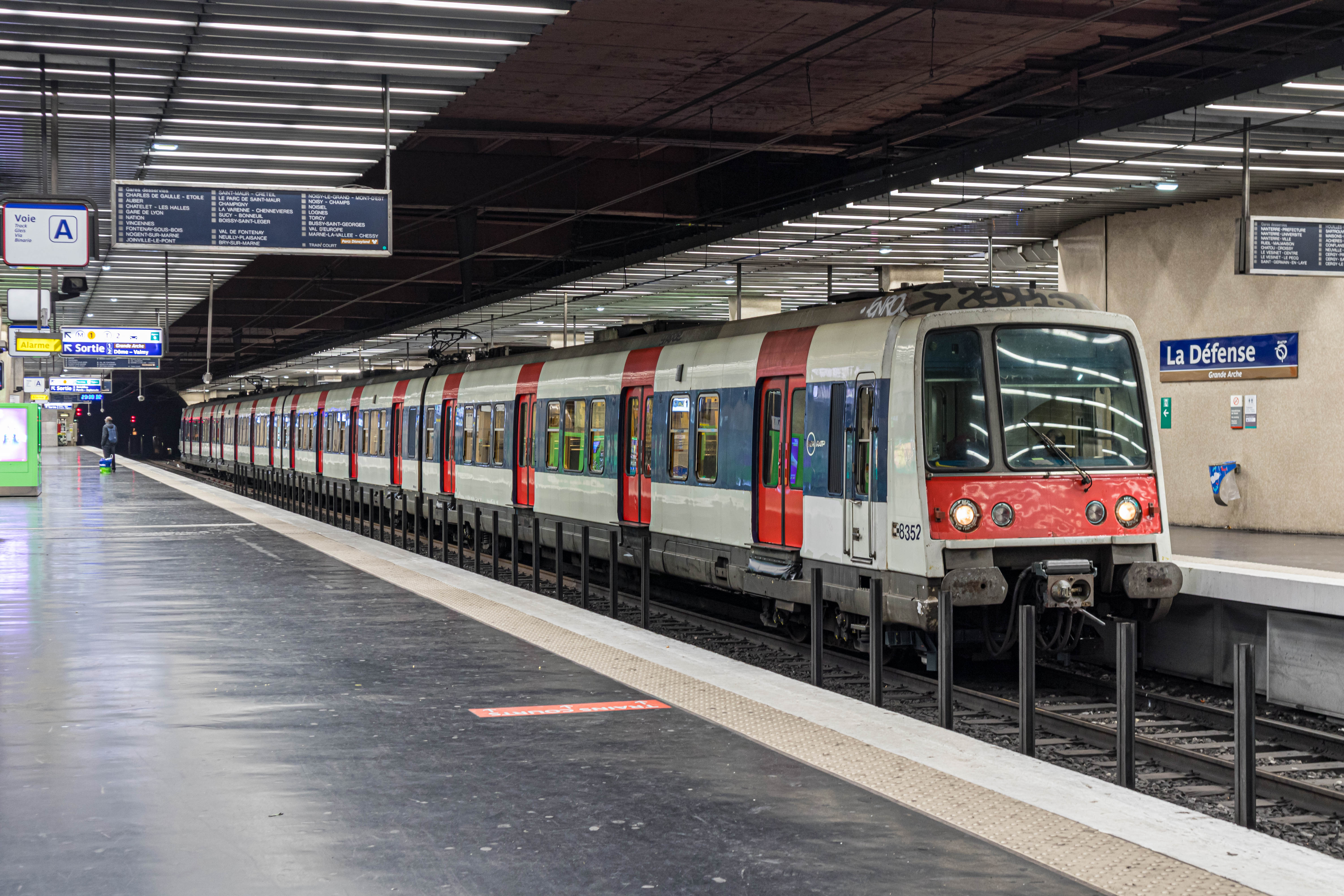
MI 84 at La Défense station on the RER A

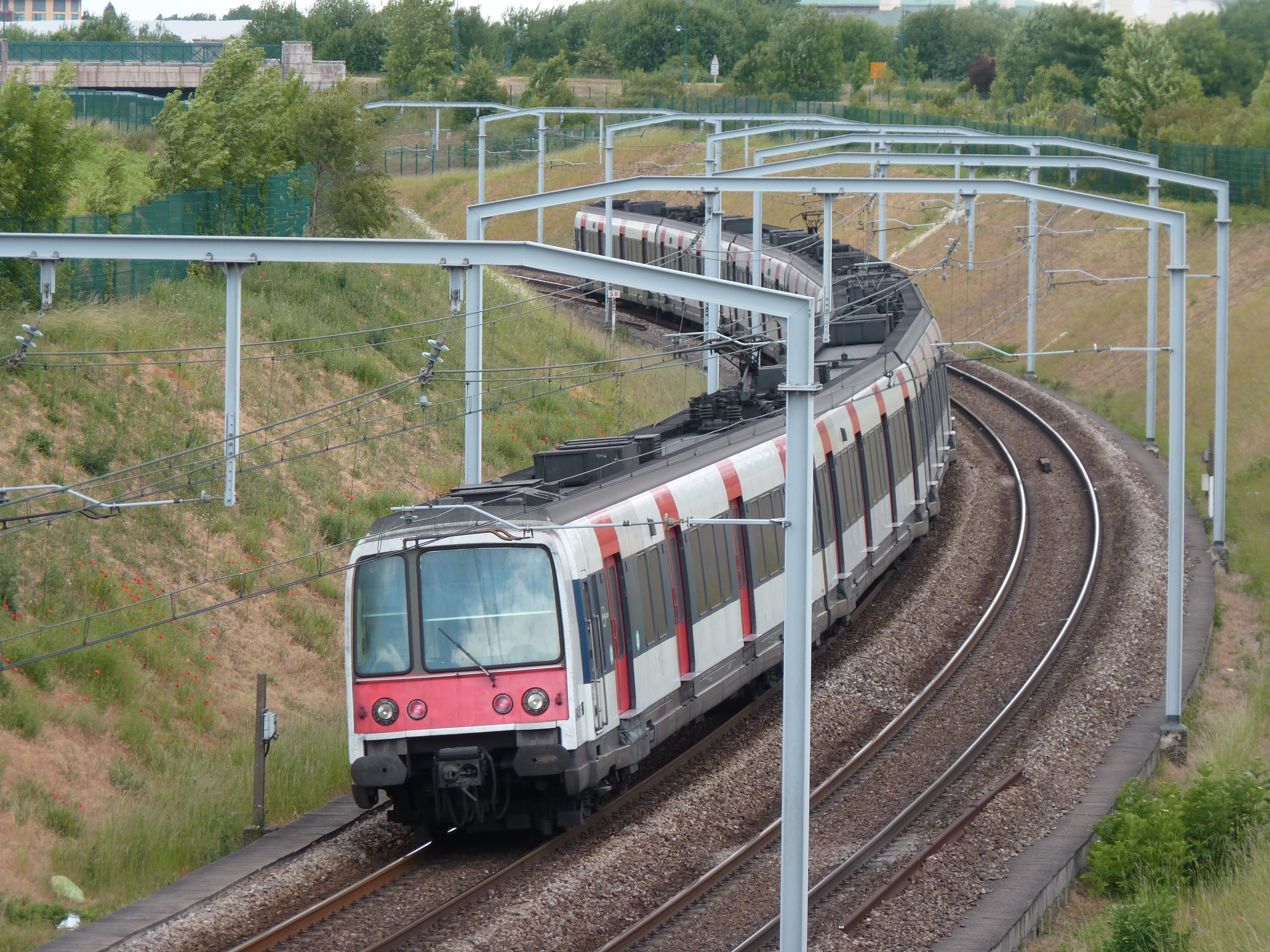
MI 84 on the RER A east branch near Marne-la-Vallée–Chessy station

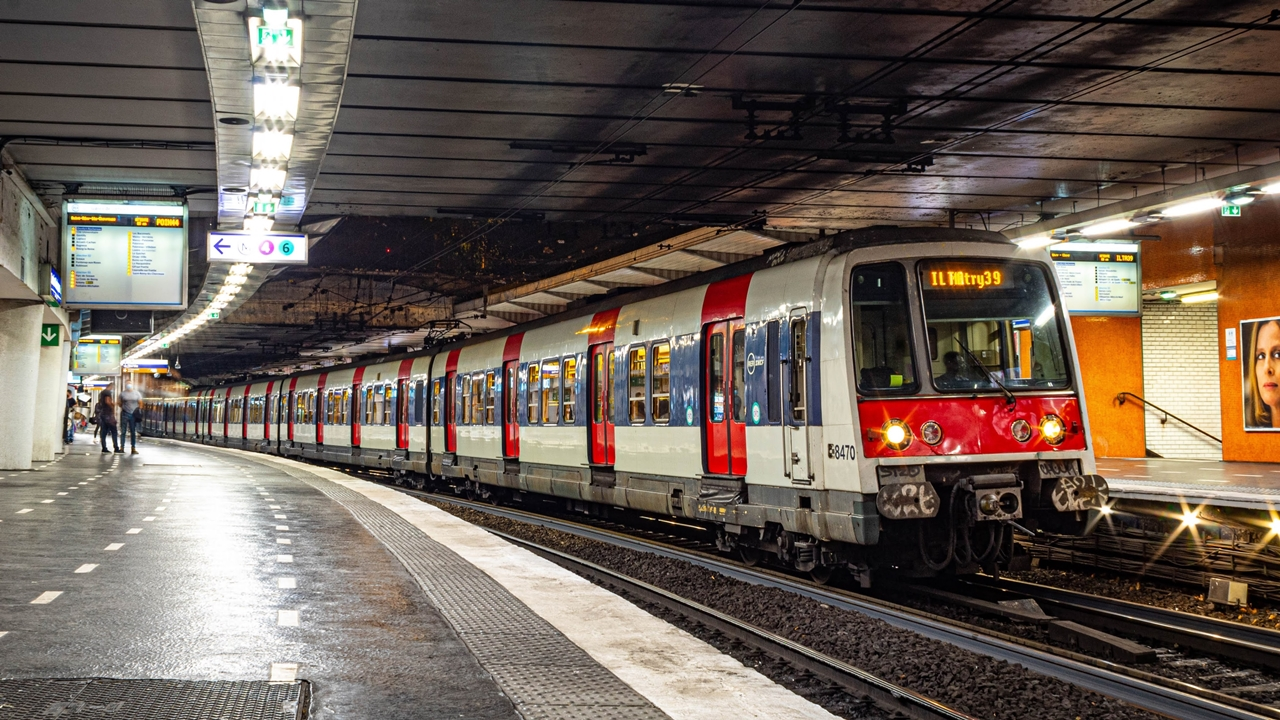
MI 84 at Denfert-Rochereau station on the RER B

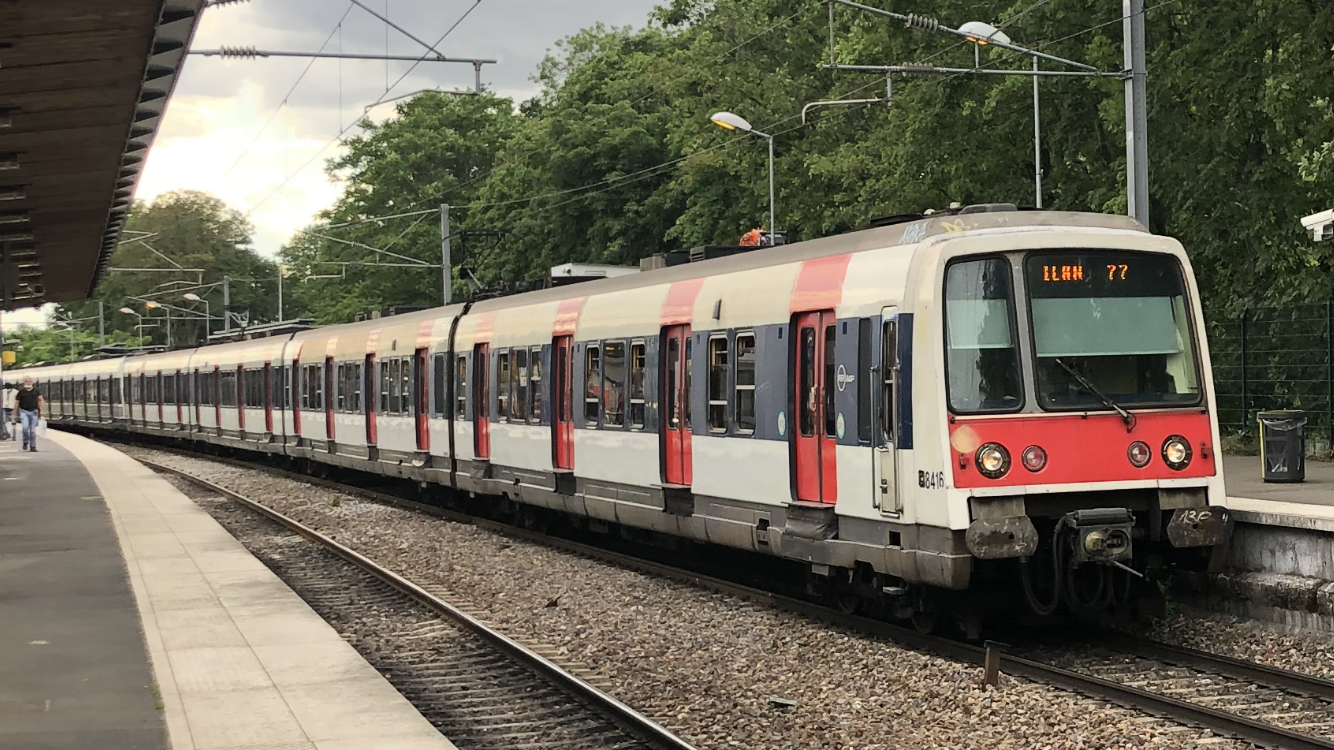
MI 84 at Sevran Livry

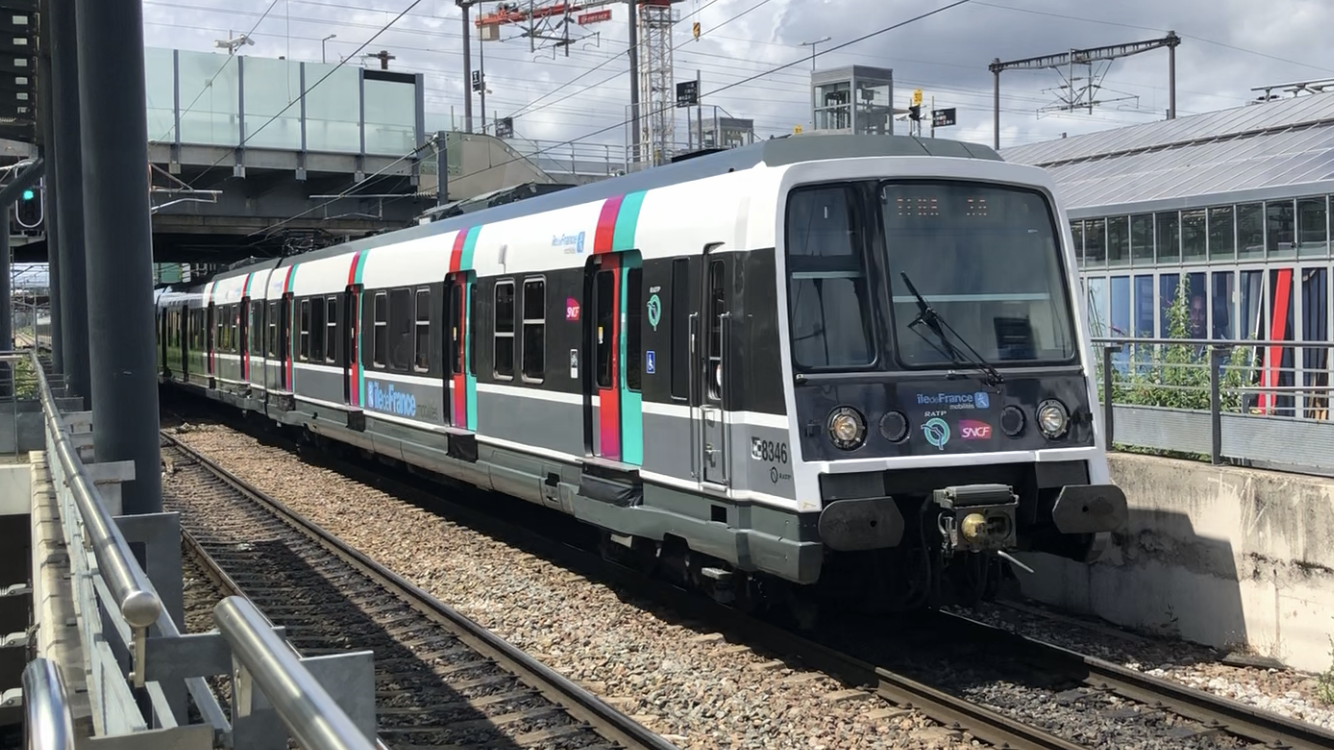
MI 84 renovated at Le Bourget

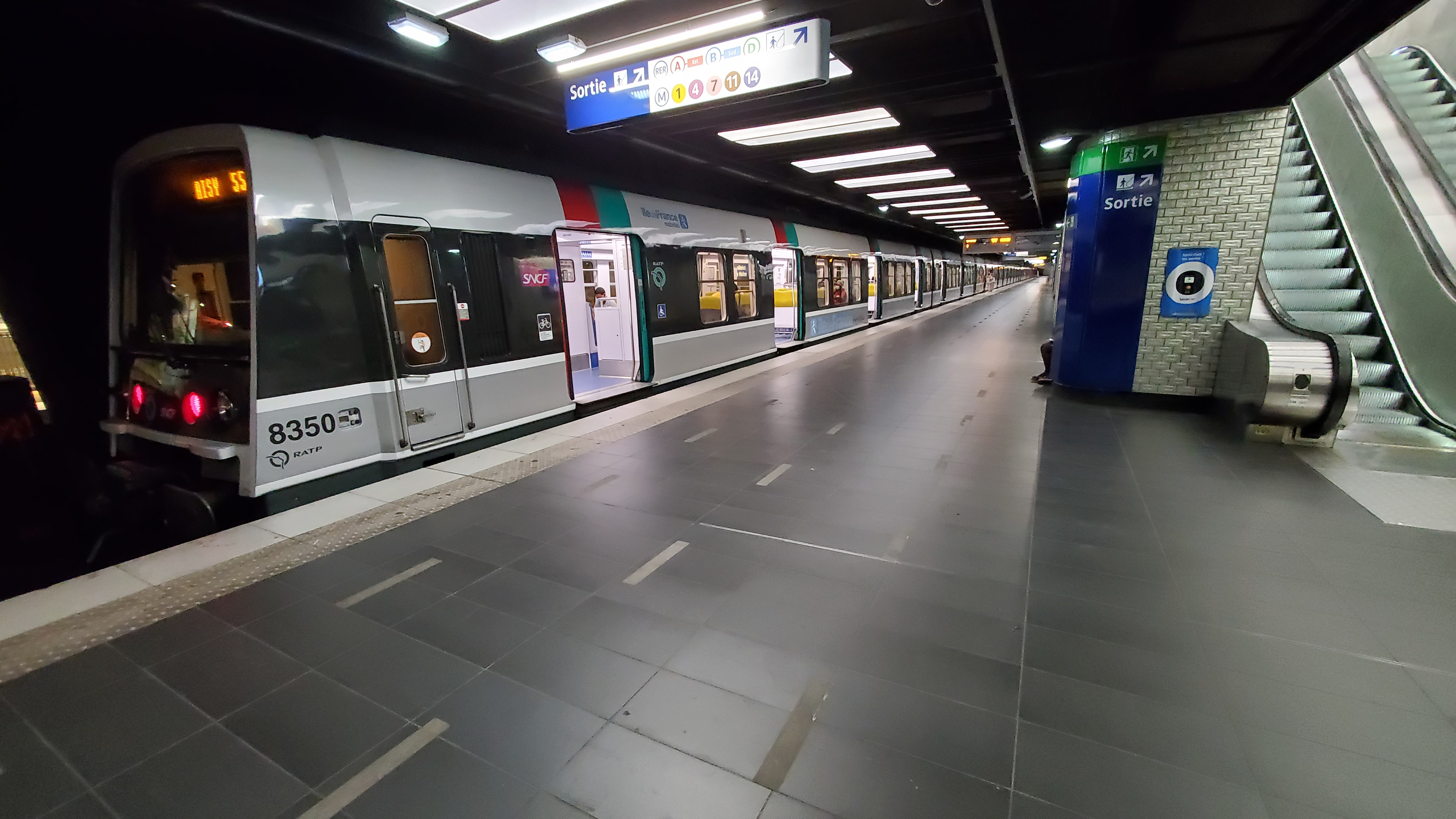
MI 84 renovated at Chatelet les Halles on the RER B

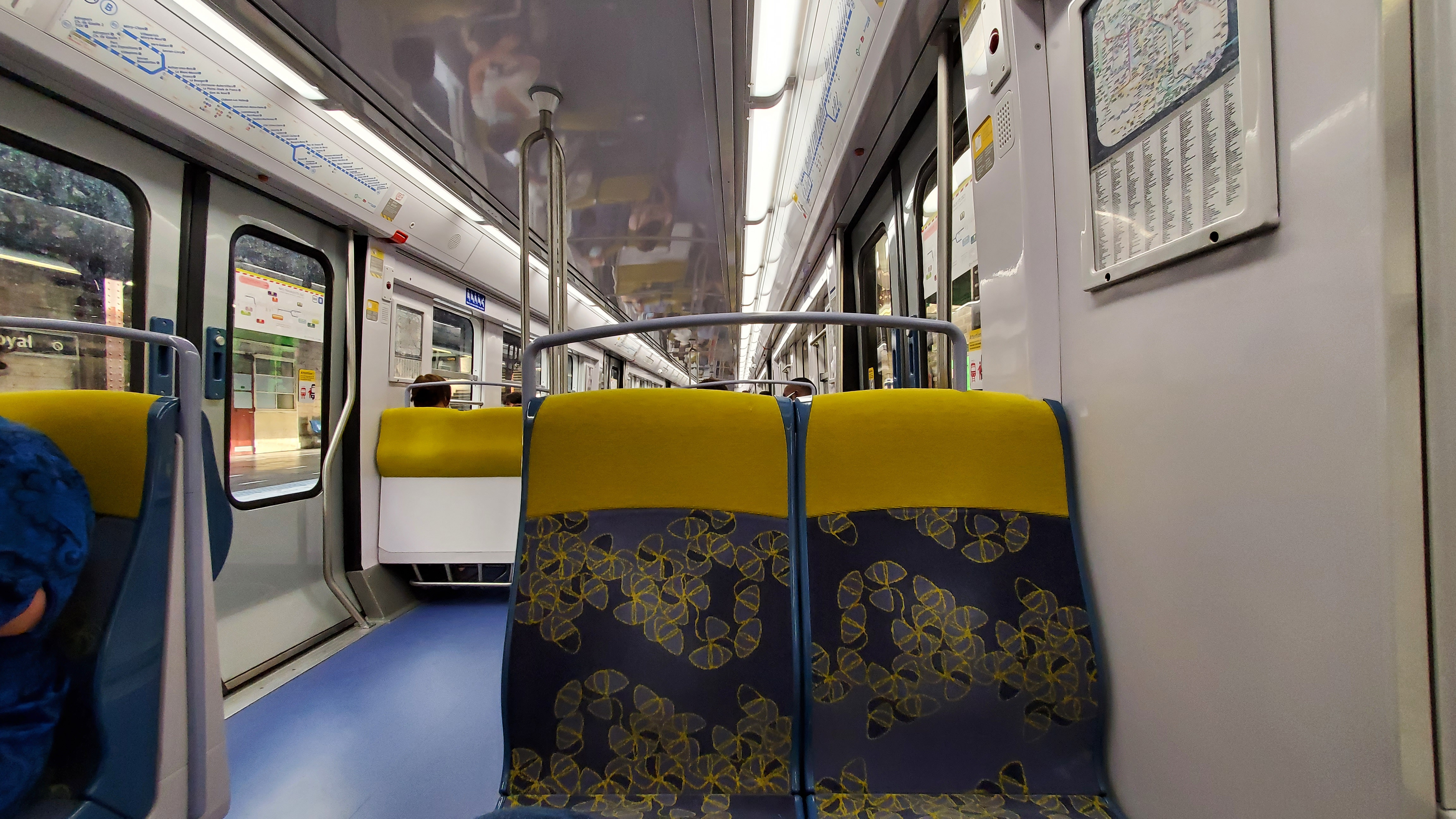
Interior of a renovated MI 84

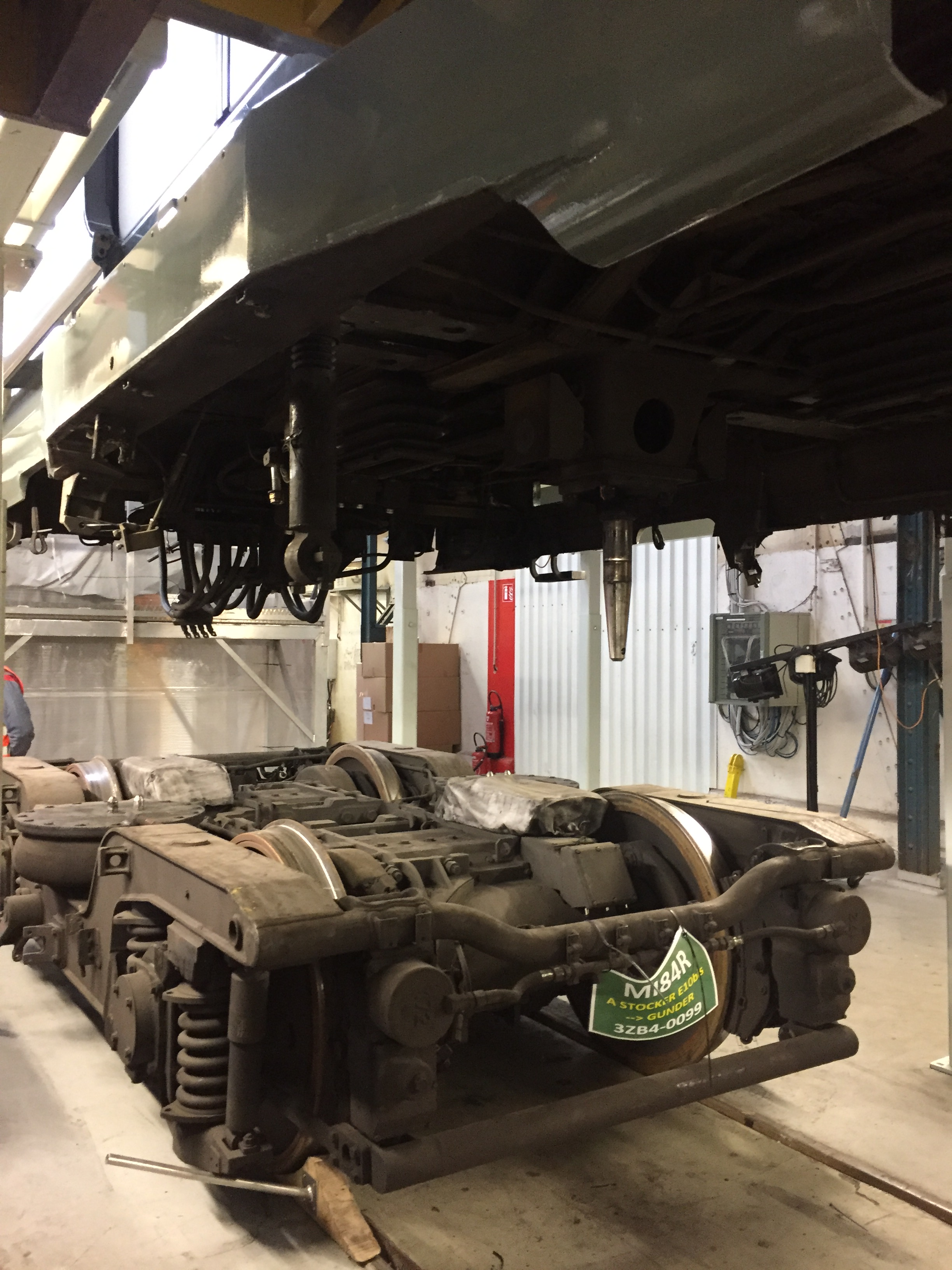
Bogie of MI 84 during refurbishment
