= RER NG =

Type of trainset in service on the Paris RER network

RER NG (Class Z 58000/Z 58500)
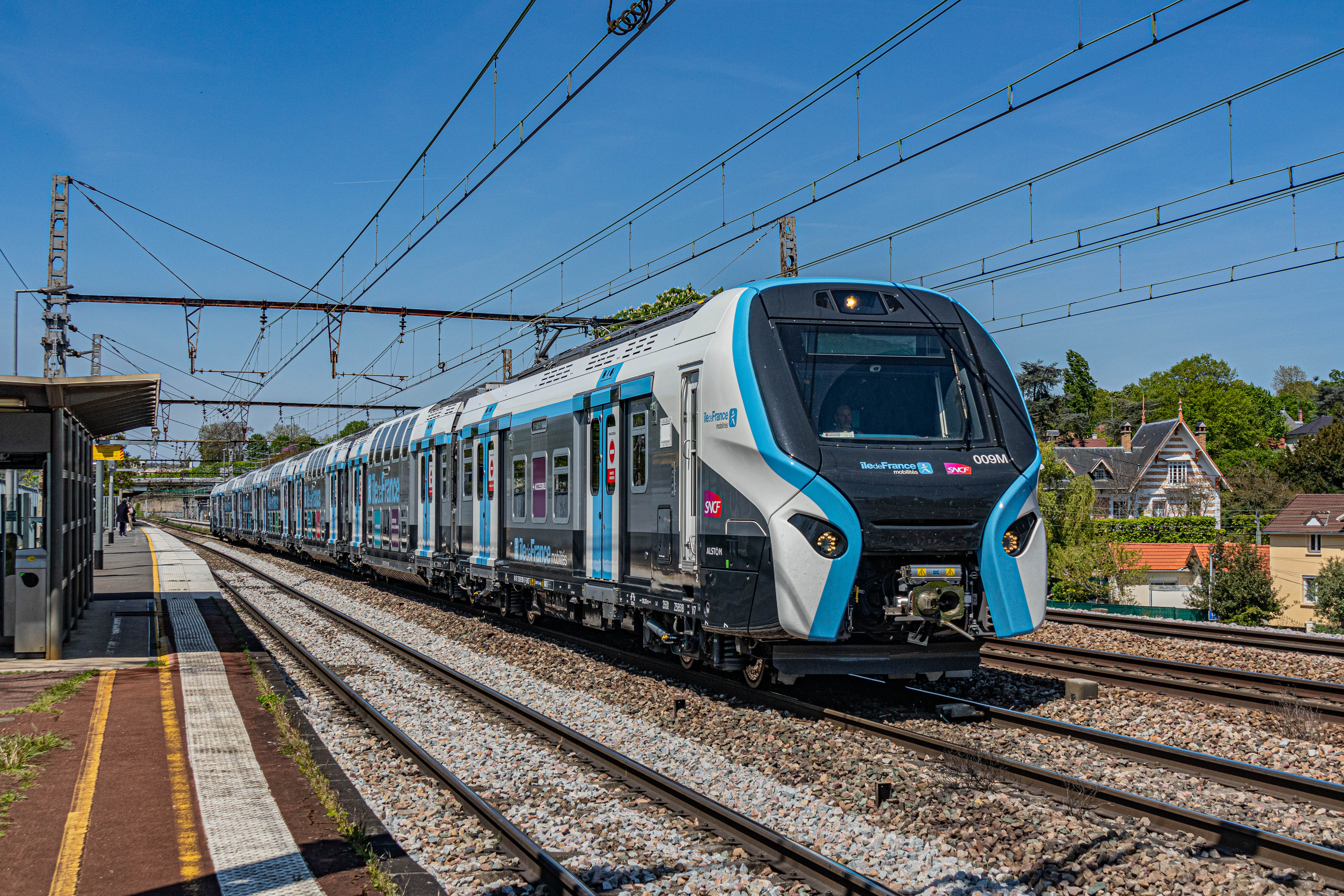
- RER NG set Z58500 undergoing testing on the RER D line between Gare de Lyon and Combs-la-Ville
- Stock type: Electric multiple unit
- In service: 2023–present
- Manufacturer: Alstom
- Family name: X'Trapolis
- Replaced: Z22500; Z20500; VB2N
- Constructed: 2018–present
- Entered service: 13 November 2023
- Number under construction: 255 trainsets
- Number in service: 121 (10/08/2026)
- Formation: 6 cars per trainset (Z 58000); 7 cars per trainset (Z 58500)
- Fleet numbers: Z 58001/2 -
- Capacity: 6 cars: 1,563 passengers; 7 cars: 1,861 passengers
- Operator: SNCF
- Depots: Joncherolles; Nanterre; Noisy-le-Sec; Villeneuve
- Line served: RER RER D RER E

Specifications
- Car body construction: Stainless steel
- Train length: 6 cars: 112 m (367 ft 5 in); 7 cars: 130 m (426 ft 6 in)
- Width: 2,996 mm (9 ft 10.0 in)
- Doors: 2 pairs per side, per car
- Maximum speed: 140 km/h (87 mph)
- Traction system: Alstom OniX IGBT–VVVF
- Traction motors: 16 × Alstom 4ECA 2842A 3-phase AC induction motor
- Power output: On 25 kV 50 Hz AC: 5,000 kW (6,700 hp); On 1,500 V DC: 4,000 kW (5,400 hp)
- Acceleration: 6 cars: 1.18 m/s^{2} (3.9 ft/s^{2}); 7 cars: 1.04 m/s^{2} (3.4 ft/s^{2})
- Deceleration: Service: 1.15 m/s^{2} (3.8 ft/s^{2}); Emergency: 1.25 m/s^{2} (4.1 ft/s^{2})
- HVAC: Refrigeration and in-train heater
- Electric systems: Overhead line: 25 kV 50 Hz AC; 1,500 V DC
- Current collection: Pantograph
- UIC classification: 6 cars: Bo′Bo′+Bo′Bo′+2′2′+2′2′+Bo′Bo′+Bo′Bo′; 7 cars: Bo′Bo′+Bo′Bo′+2′2′+2′2′+2′2′+Bo′Bo′+Bo′Bo′
- Braking system: Electrodynamic regenerative brake
- Safety systems: Crocodile, KVB, CBTC (NExTEO)
- Coupling system: Scharfenberg-type, made by Dellner
- Multiple working: Within type
- Track gauge: 1,435 mm (4 ft 8 1/2 in) standard gauge

The RER NG (French: RER Nouvelle Génération, lit. 'RER New Generation'), also known as the X'Trapolis Cityduplex and classified as Class Z 58000 and Class Z 58500, is a double-deck, dual-voltage electric multiple unit trainset operating on line D and line E of the Réseau Express Régional (RER), a hybrid suburban commuter and rapid transit system serving Paris and its Île-de-France suburbs. The trainsets entered service in November 2023 on line E, and in December 2024 on line D.

The trainsets are manufactured by a consortium of French company Alstom and Canadian company Bombardier Transportation. The RER NG is part of Alstom's X'Trapolis Duplex platform and is a development of previous double-deck trainsets built by the consortium, including the Z 2N, MI 2N, and MI 09 series.

Final assembly takes place at Alstom's factory in Valenciennes and the former Bombardier plant in Crespin, while the car bodies are manufactured at Alstom's plant in Česká Lípa, Czech Republic.

== History ==
As Île-de-France Mobilités and SNCF prepared to extend the RER E line west across Paris, the agencies issued an invitation to tender for new trainsets for the line and overall fleet replacement. Several manufacturers responded including a consortium of Alstom and Bombardier, CAF, and Siemens.

Ultimately, the €3.75 billion contract was awarded to Alstom and Bombardier on 6 January 2017. The consortium had previously built several generations of double-deck trainsets, including the Z 2N, MI 2N, and MI 09 series. Similar to those earlier contracts, Alstom would build the two end cars, which contain the cabs, while Bombardier manufactured the intermediate cars. The contract will supply 255 trainsets, 130 for the RER E and 125 for fleet replacement, which are planned to be assigned to the RER D, replacing older trainsets.

In October 2018, Île-de-France Mobilités purchased an additional 64 trainsets for fleet replacement, increasing the total contract to 371 trainsets.

In spring 2020, the first trainset started testing in the Czech Republic.

On April 26, 2023, Alstom announced the exercise of a first option for the supply of 60 additional trainsets, bringing orders to 131 trainsets.

The first six-car Z 58000 trainsets were introduced to regular passenger service on line E of the RER on 13 November 2023. Introduction of seven-car Z 58500 trainsets on line D followed on 13 December 2024.

== Description ==
The design of the RER NG is similar to Bombardier's Regio 2N trainsets with a mix of single and double-deck cars. The single-level end cars are designed to offer level boarding that accommodates disabled passengers who are unable to use stairs and standing passengers traveling short distances. The double-deck intermediate cars accommodate seated passengers traveling longer distances.

The RER NG trainsets are being built in two different configurations:

- Class Z 58000: 130 six-car trainsets for the RER line E consisting of two single-level cars with cabs and motors, two bi-level cars with motors, and two unpowered bi-level cars at a total length of 112 metres (367 ft).
- Class Z 58500: 125 seven-car trainsets for the RER line D consisting of two single-level cars with cabs and motors, two bi-level cars with motors, and three unpowered bi-level cars at a total length of 130 metres (430 ft).

The single-level end cars are 20 metres (65 ft 7 in) long, with two doors per side (one 1.3 metres (4 ft 3 in) wide and one 1.95 metres (6 ft 5 in) wide). The double-deck intermediate cars each have two doors per side. The doors located just behind the driving cabs are fitted with gap fillers to enable level boarding for passengers using a mobility device, like a wheelchair.

All trainsets have open-gangways allowing passengers to travel from one end of the trainset to the other, allowing more an even distribution of passengers on board, reducing crowding during peak periods. Unlike some other open-gangway trainsets, the RER NG will not use a jacobs bogie between cars, but rather a conventional architecture with two bogies on each car.

Like all RER trains since the MI 84, the RER NG is required to meet strict acceleration standards, being able to fully depart a 225-metre (738 ft 2 in) platform in 23 seconds. Despite the fact that the RER NG is heavier and up to 17 metres (55 ft 9 in) longer than a MI 84, it is able to meet this standard with its eight or ten motorised bogies.

The maximum top speed for the RER NG in service is 140 kilometres per hour (87 mph). During testing, speeds of 160 kilometres per hour (99 mph) were reached.

The RER NG trainsets are equipped with the NExTEO system for operating in the tunnels of the central section on the RER E, allowing for travel speeds at up to 120 kilometres per hour (75 mph) in that section.

== Formations ==
=== Class Z 58000 ===
The six-car class Z 58000 trainsets are in operation on RER line E. They are based at the Noisy-le-Sec ,Chelles and Nanterre SNCF workshops.

As shown below, they are formed of four motorised cars and two non-powered trailer cars:

RER E	← Nanterre-La-Folie Chelles–Gournay/Tournan →					
Car No.	1 >	2	3	4	5	< 6
Type	Motor	Motor	Trailer	Trailer	Motor	Motor

Cars 1 and 6 are equipped with pantographs, denoted with < and > in the chart above denoting which is in use in each direction.

=== Class Z 58500 ===
The seven-car Class Z 58500 trainsets are in operation on RER line D. They are based at the Villeneuve and Joncherolles SNCF depots.

As shown below, they are formed of four motorised cars and three non-powered trailer cars:

RER D	← Creil Corbeil-Essonnes/Malesherbes/Melun →						
Car No.	1 >	2	3	4	5	6	< 7
Type	Motor	Motor	Trailer	Trailer	Trailer	Motor	Motor

Cars 1 and 7 are equipped with pantographs, denoted with < and > in the chart above denoting which is in use in each direction.
