= SNCF Class Z 22500 =

Double-deck trainsets operated on the French RER E line

Z 22500 MI 2N "Eole"
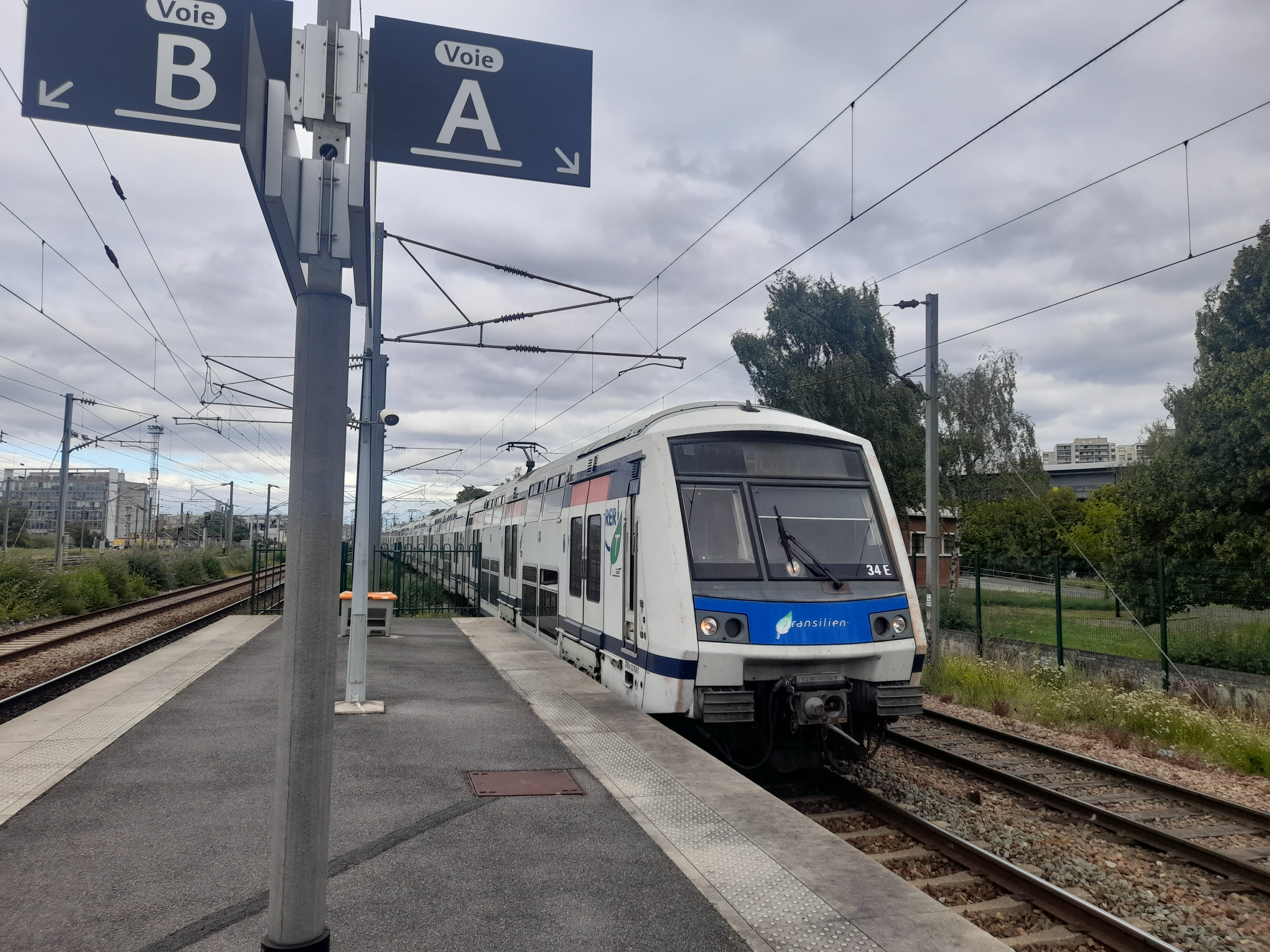
- MI 2N Eole element 34E at Pantin.
- In service: 1998–2026
- Manufacturers: GEC Alsthom and Bombardier
- Family name: MI 2N, X'Trapolis
- Constructed: 1997–2000
- Entered service: 1997–2000
- Scrapped: 2025-2026
- Number built: 53
- Number in service: 0
- Number scrapped: 39 but 14 (in GBE)
- Successor: Z 58000
- Formation: 5 cars per trainset (R+M+R1+M+R) and before 4 cars per trainset (R+M+M+R)
- Fleet numbers: Z 22501/2 to Z 22605/6
- Capacity: 1,337 passengers
- Operator: SNCF
- Depot: Noisy-le-Sec
- Line served: RER RER E

Specifications
- Car body construction: Stainless steel
- Train length: 112 m (367 ft 5 7/16 in)
- Width: 2.9 m (9 ft 6 3/16 in)
- Height: 4.32 m (14 ft 2 3/32 in)
- Low-floor: 370 mm
- Doors: 2 × 3 per car
- Maximum speed: 140 km/h (87 mph)
- Weight: 277 t (273 long tons; 305 short tons)
- Traction system: GEC Alsthom GTO CSI
- Traction motors: 8 × 450 kW (603 hp) 4 FXA 3561 B asynchronous, 550V, force ventilated
- Power output: 3,600 kW (4,828 hp) (continuous)
- Acceleration: 1 m/s^{2} (3.3 ft/s^{2})
- Deceleration: 1.15 m/s^{2} (3.8 ft/s^{2}) (service); 1.25 m/s^{2} (4.1 ft/s^{2}) (emergency)
- Electric systems: Overhead line: 25 kV 50 Hz AC; 1,500 V DC
- Current collection: Pantograph (type AX 25)
- UIC classification: 2′2′+Bo′Bo′+2′2′+Bo′Bo′+2′2′
- Braking systems: Regenerative, disc and electrodynamic eddy current brake
- Safety systems: Crocodile, EAS and KVB
- Coupling system: Scharfenberg type
- Multiple working: 2x Z 22500 trainsets (regular service)
- Track gauge: 1,435 mm (4 ft 8 1/2 in) standard gauge

The SNCF Class Z 22500, also known as the MI 2N "Éole" (French: Matériel d'Interconnexion à 2 Niveaux, lit. 'Interconnecting Bilevel Set'), was a double-deck, dual-voltage electric multiple unit (EMU) operated on RER E, part of the Réseau Express Régional (RER), a hybrid suburban commuter and rapid transit system serving Paris and the surrounding Île-de-France region, between 1999 and 2026.

The Z 22500 was the version of the MI 2N series operated by the SNCF. It closely resembles the MI 2N "Altéo" variant operated by the RATP Group, although the two variants differ in their motorization and interior layout.

A total of 43 five-car trainsets were built by a consortium of Alstom (then GEC Alsthom) and Bombardier. Final assembly took place at Alstom's facility in Valenciennes and Bombardier's plant in Crespin between 1997 and 2000. The first unit entered service in 1997.

== History ==
By the end of the 1980s, the RER A line had become the busiest in the system and the busiest single rail line outside of East Asia. Overcrowding on the RER A was already the main transport problem in the greater Paris area. To address this issue, several projects were launched: the SNCF started construction of the Est Ouest Liaison Express (EOLE; English: east west express link) which would later be known as the RER E line, while the RATP started construction of the Paris Metro Line 14, both of which would both parallel the RER A in central Paris.

At about the same time, the RATP also began investigating using double-deck trains on the RER A. Double-deck trains, like the Z 2N series (Class Z 5600 and Class Z 8800) were already in use on suburban SNCF networks and could carry up to 2,600 people per train, compared to 1,887 people on the single-deck MS 61 trains that had been used on the RER A since it opened.

That left the RATP looking for new equipment for the RER A at the same time as SNCF needed to purchase equipment for the soon to open RER E line, so in 1989 they decided to team up and issue a call for tenders. In November 1992, they placed an order for 17 MI 2N trainsets from a consortium of French manufacturer Alstom (at the time known as GEC Alsthom) and Canadian conglomerate Bombardier. The MI 2N would be based on the design of SNCF's Class Z 20500 trains being built by the same consortium for RER C and RER D lines, but with modifications to make them better suited to the busy RER A line, most notably three wide doors on each side of the cars (the Z 20500 only had two).

The RATP version of the trains for the RER A would be called the MI 2N "Altéo", and the SNCF version for the RER E would be called the Class Z 22500, also known as the MI 2N "Eole" (after the EOLE name of the RER E during construction). The two trains look very similar from the outside, but the Class Z 22500 would only have two motors (the Altéo would feature three motors per trainset for faster acceleration) and would eliminate the stairs to the upper deck to the center vestibule adding 22 additional seats per train (the Altéo kept the stairs to speed the movement of passengers at stations).

A pre-production train was delivered on 10 March 1996 for joint testing by both RATP and SNCF. The Z 22500 trains were put into revenue service on the Paris-Saint-Lazare with only 4 cars per trainsets because of the short platform of Saint-Lazare station and Paris – Est network of Transilien trains from September 1998 to June 1999. The Z 22500 trains were transferred to the RER E before its opening in July 1999, where they have been in service since.

== Technical description ==
Each trainset is 112 metres (367 ft) long and can carry up to 2,600 passengers, including approximately 1,100 seated. The configuration includes two non-powered cab cars with pantographs, two powered intermediate cars, and a central trailer. Compared to the MI 2N Altéo used on RER A, which has three powered cars, the Z 22500 has just two powered cars, with fewer traction motors (8 vs. 12) and slightly lower acceleration (1.0 m/s² vs. 1.1 m/s²), though braking performance is similar (1.15 m/s² in regular service).

While the RER E only uses 25 kV AC electrification, the Z 22500 can also operate with the 1.5 kV DC electrification used by RATP. Also, while most RER E stations have high platforms, the Z 22500 is also compatible with different platform heights. Each car features three wide doors per side to support high passenger throughput.

Unlike the Altéo, the Z 22500 lacks refrigerated ventilation and the SACEM automated control system used on RER A. However, it includes modern safety systems such as continuous speed monitoring, automatic braking, dual-mode RST/GSM-R communication, CCTV surveillance, and crash energy management features inspired by high-speed train design.

The braking system combines multiple technologies: electropneumatic braking controlled by a Train Control and Management System (TCMS), regenerative and electrodynamic braking to recover energy and reduce wear, and electromagnetic track brakes for emergency stops, capable of achieving deceleration up to 1.25 metres per second squared (4.1 ft/s^{2}).

== Replacement ==
The trains have been replaced by the RER NG trains, which gradually entered service on the RER E between 2023 and 2026. The trains are to be fully retired, as plans to cascade them to other lines has been shelved since the cost of modifying other lines to adapt the trains has deemed to be too expensive.

The last train was retired from service on 10 November 2026.

== Formations ==
As of 1 March 2022, 53 Z22500 trainsets (01E to 53E), were based at the Chelles and Noisy-le-Sec SNCF depots.

Car types are identified by designations such as ZRBxe (cab car with pantograph), ZBxe and ZRBe (powered cars), and ZABe (central trailer). Cars marked with an "e" indicate double-deck design, though this suffix may be omitted in some markings.

As shown below, the trainsets are formed with three motored cars and three non-powered (trailer) cars (2M3T).

	← Haussmann–Saint-Lazare (Paris) Chelles–Gournay/Tournan →				
Car No.	1 >	2	3	4	< 5
Type	T	M	T	M	T
Numbering	ZRBx 2215xx (odd number)	ZBx 225xx (odd number)	ZRBx 2225xx (trainset number)	ZABx 225xx (even number)	ZRBx 2215xx (even number)

- < or > show a pantograph. Cars 1 and 5 were each equipped with one pantograph.

== Photo gallery ==
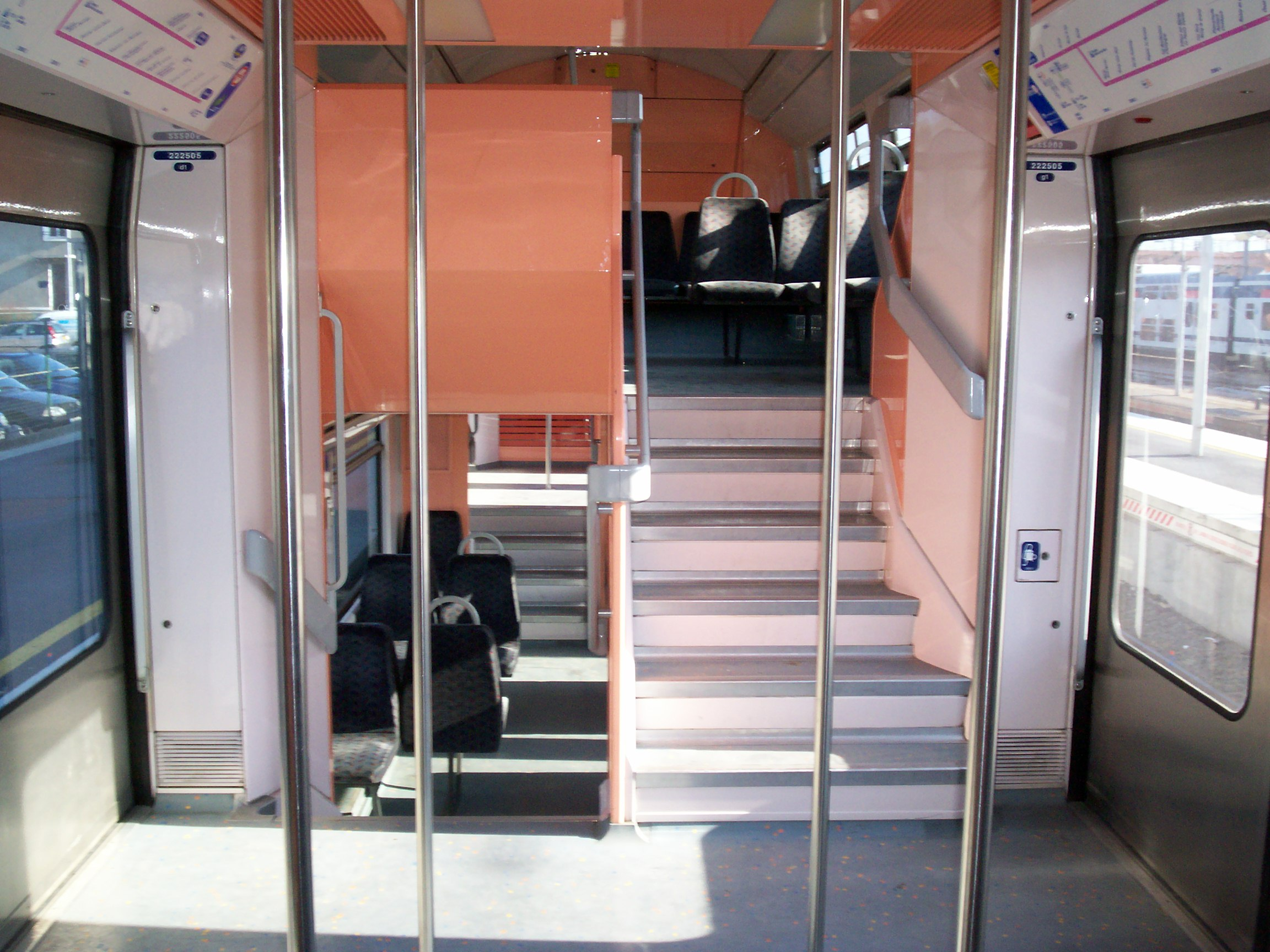
Interior, mid-deck showing stairs to upper and lower decks

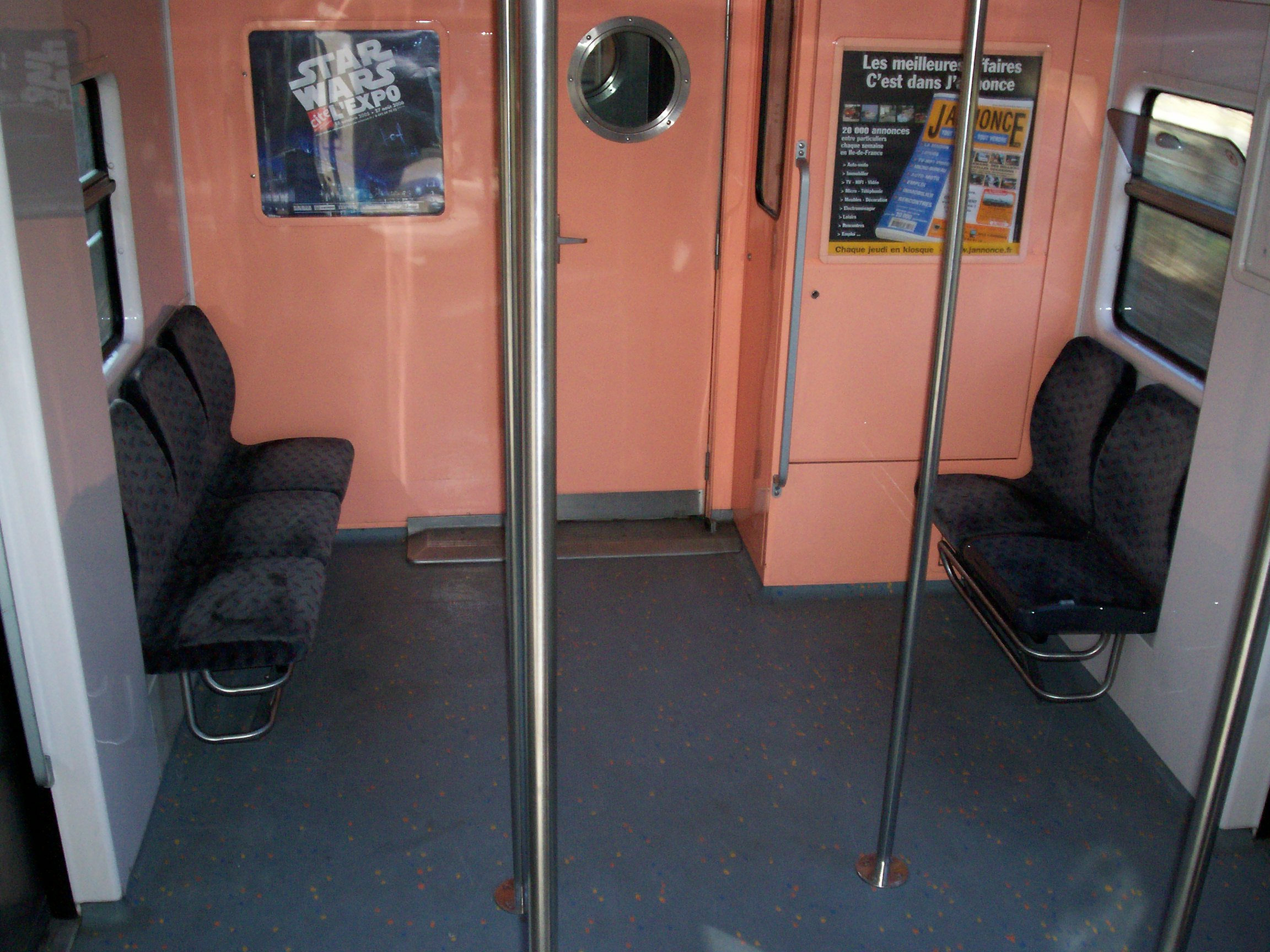
Interior, mid-deck showing more floor space than in a MI 2N "Altéo" due to the lack of equipment enclosures

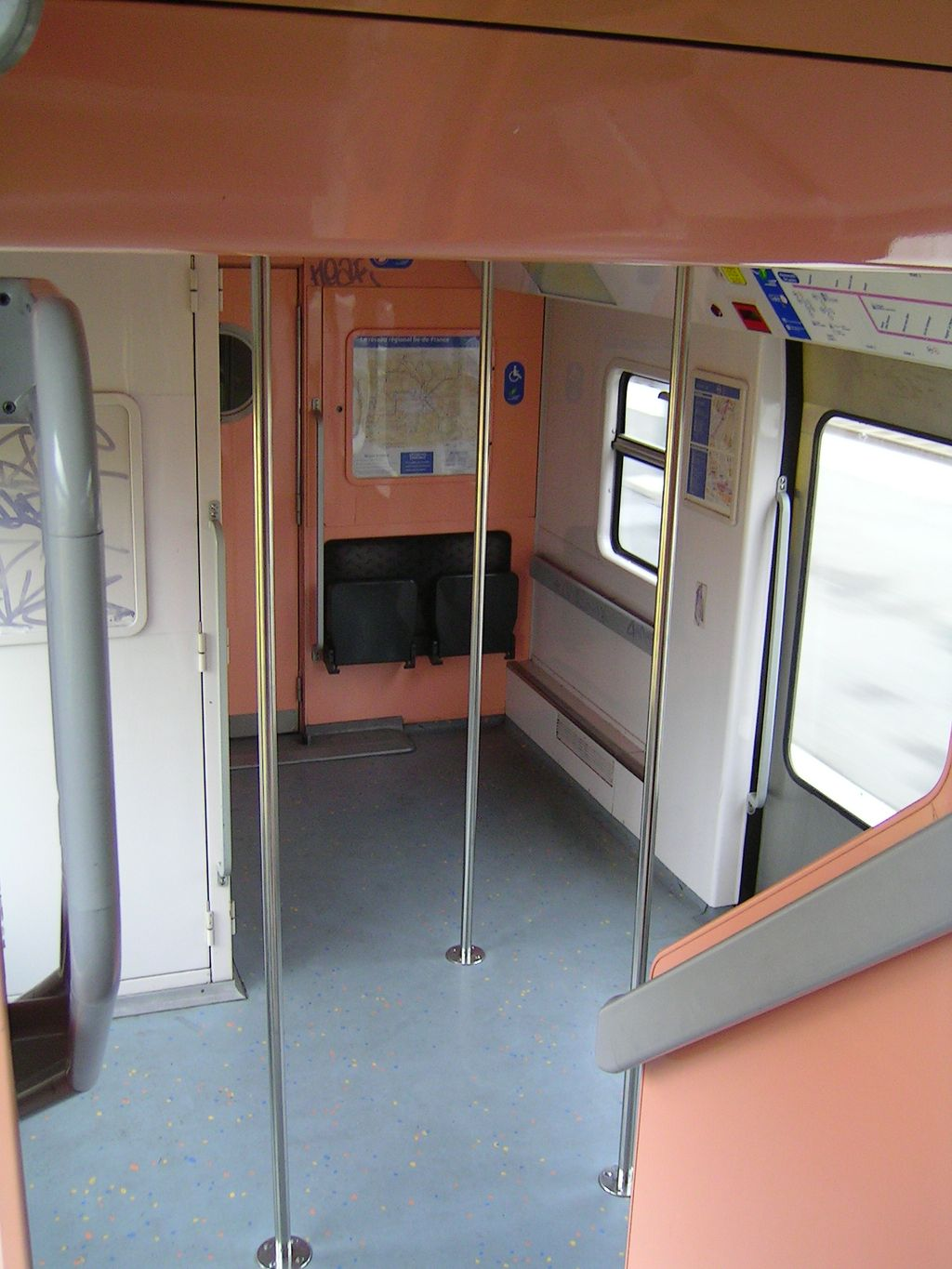
Interior, mid-deck area designated for wheelchair users adjacent to operators compartment

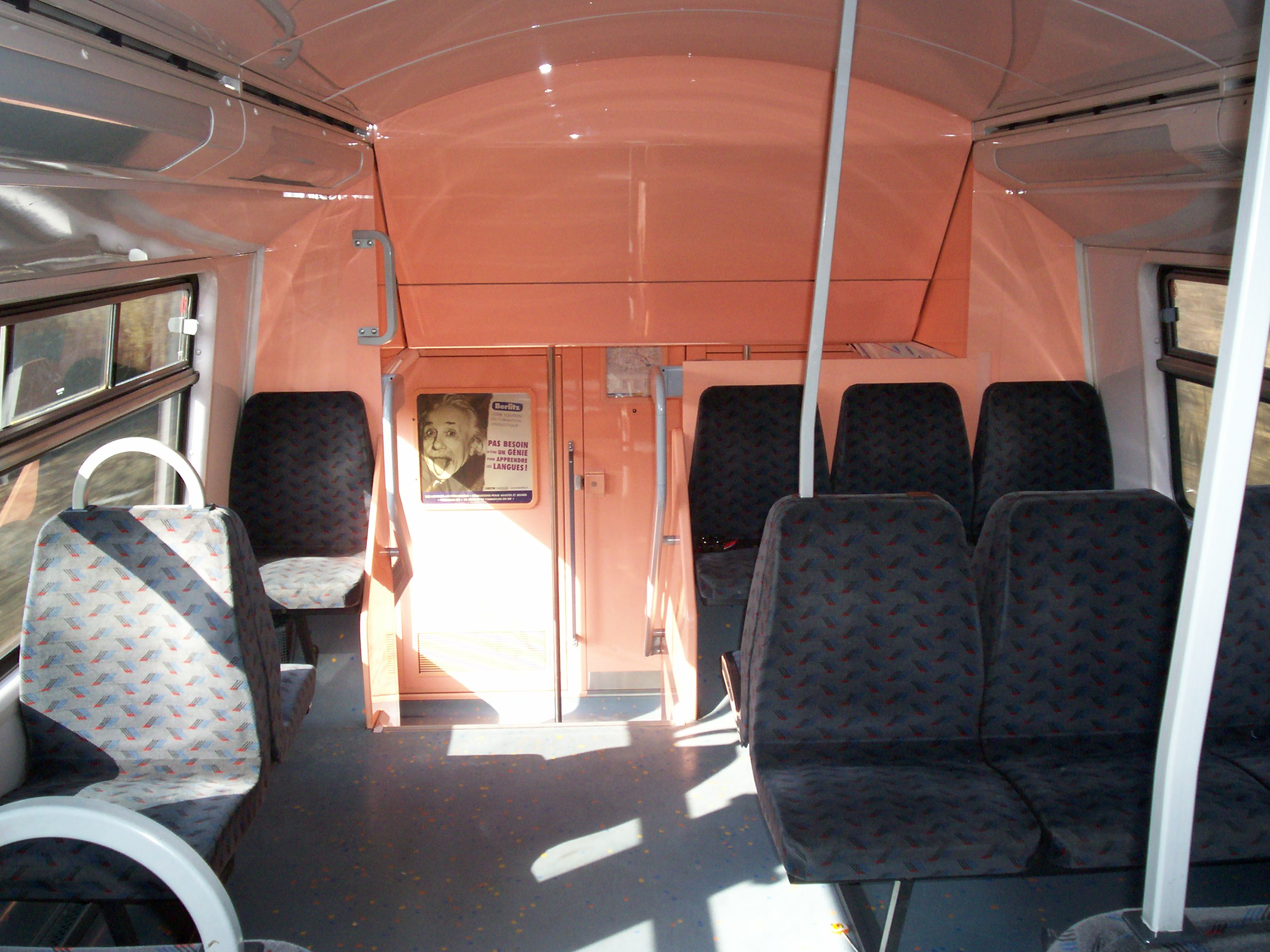
Interior, upper deck

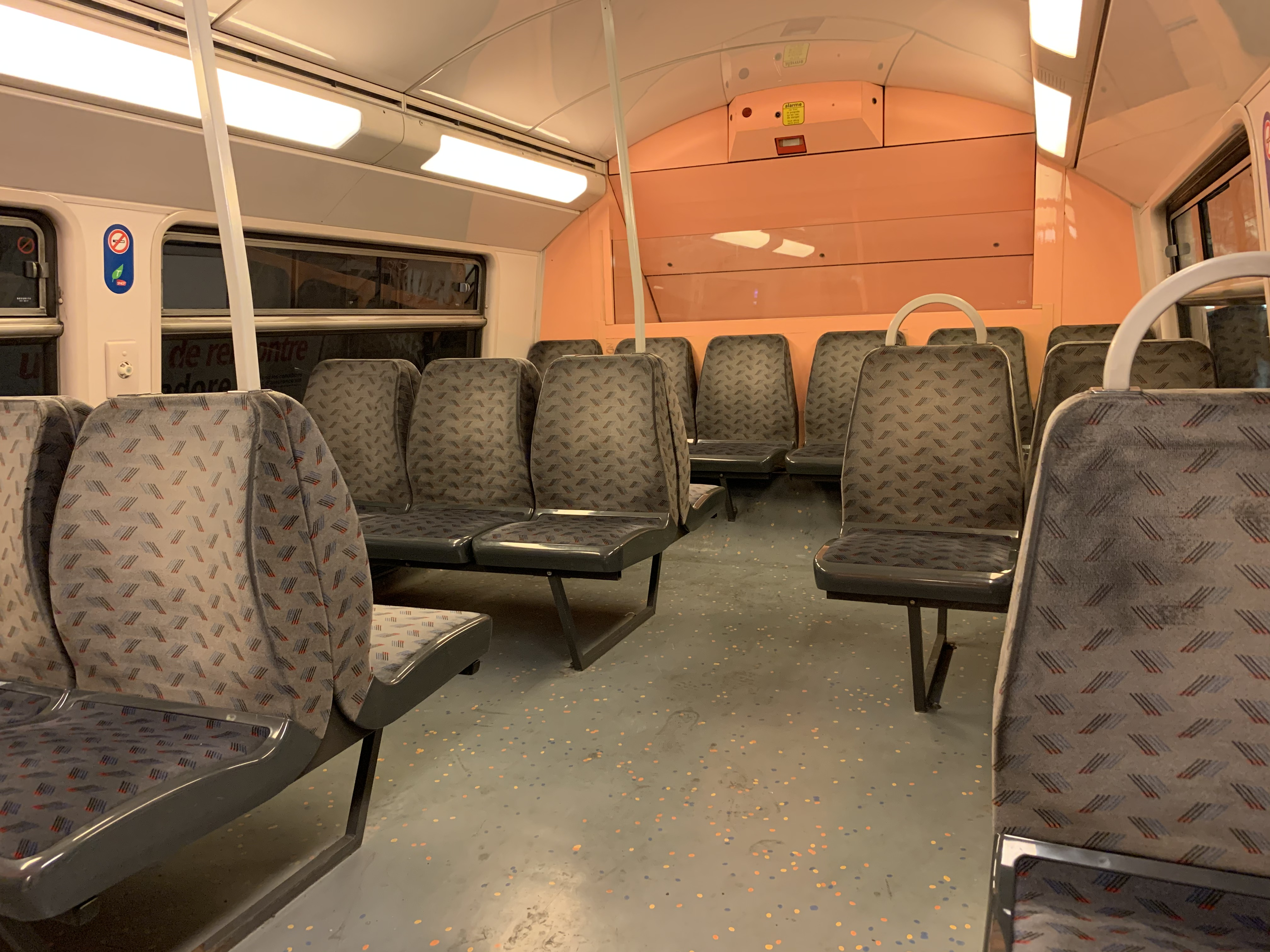
Interior, upper deck showing additional seating compared to MI 2N "Altéo" because of the eliminated stairs

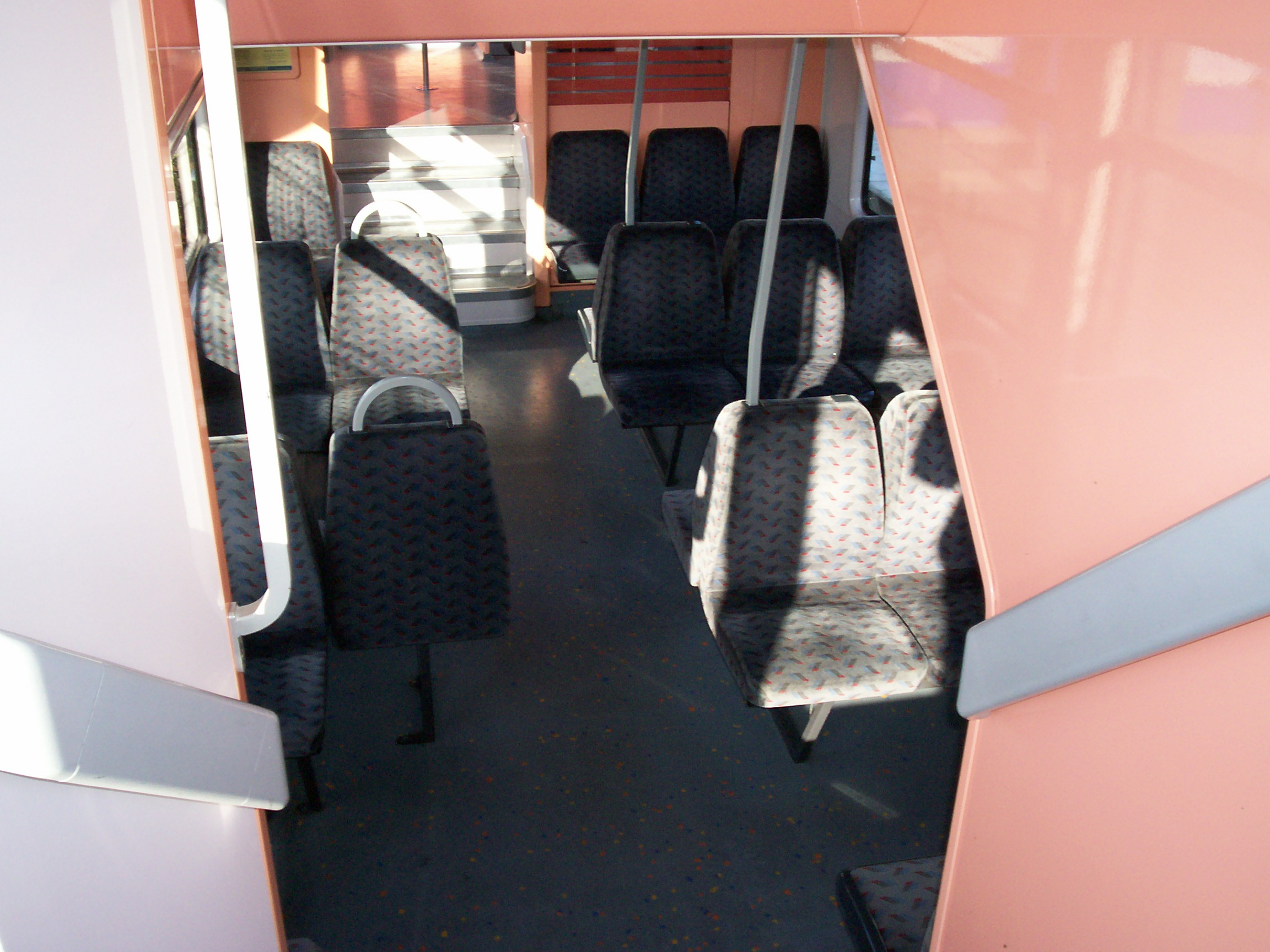
Interior, lower deck
