= X'Trapolis =

Series of multiple unit trains

The X'Trapolis (also stylized as X'TRAPOLIS) is a series of multiple unit trains designed and built by Alstom. The trains have high floors, and are available in both single- and double-deck configurations. They are typically powered by an external electrical source, but may also be powered by batteries, hydrogen or diesel-electric power units. The series is being rebranded to "Adessia" and the names are used interchangeably.

== Models ==
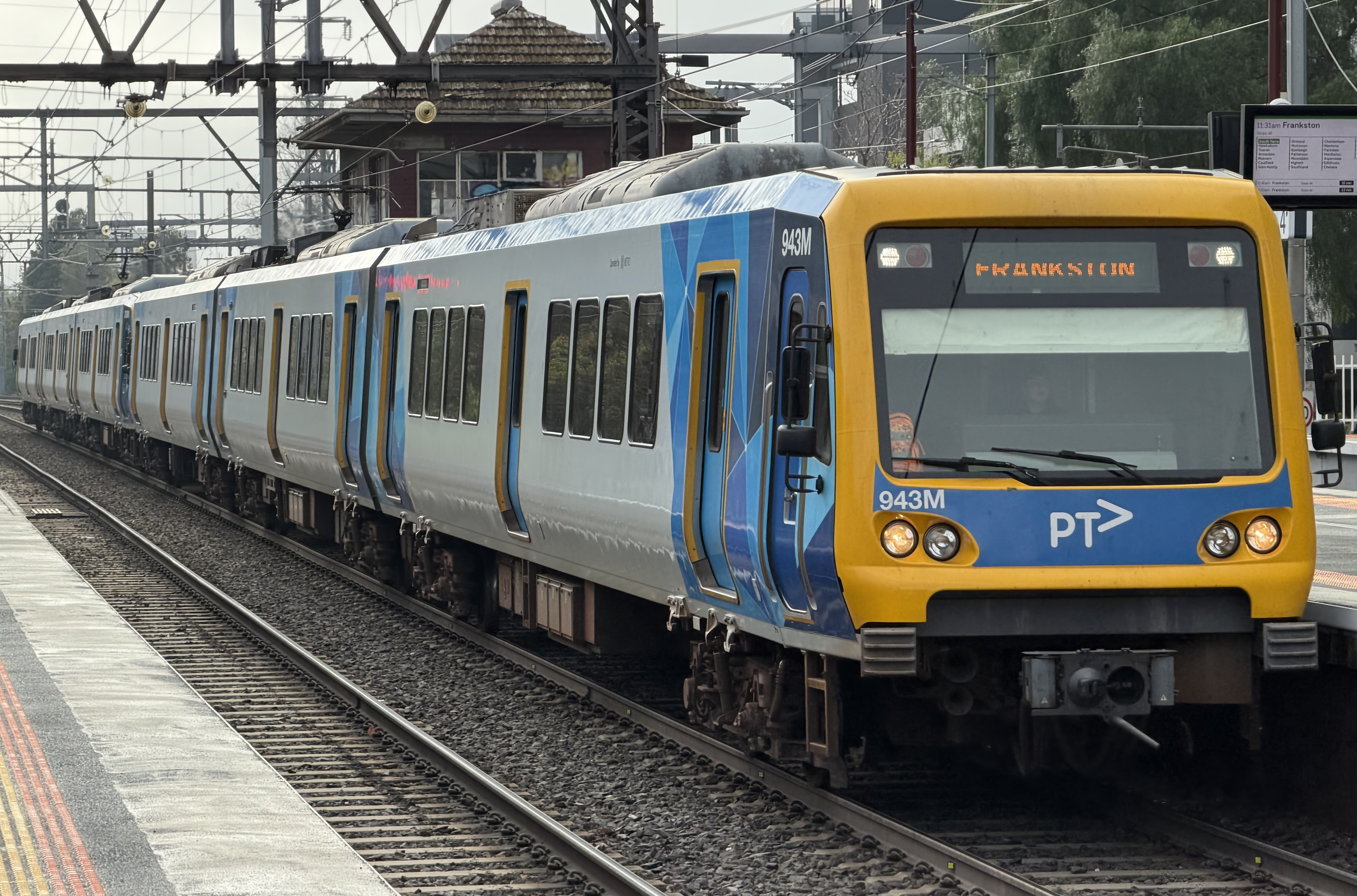
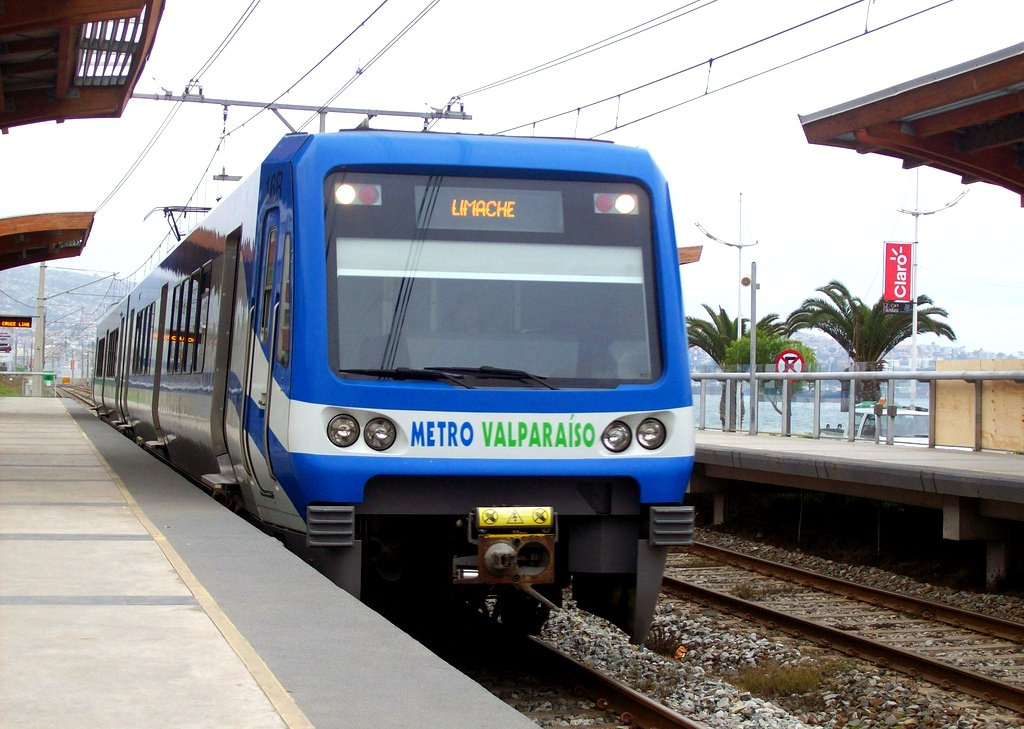
The X'Trapolis 100 as used in Melbourne, Victoria, Australia (top) and in Valparaíso, Chile (bottom).

=== Current ===
- X'Trapolis Duplex – Réseau Express Régional (Paris and Île-de-France, France)
  - Locally designated MI 2N;
    - "Altéo" for line A, introduced 1997.
    - "Éole" for line E, introduced 1998. Soon to be replaced by the X'Trapolis Cityduplex.
  - Locally designated MI 09 for line A, introduced 2011.
  - X'Trapolis Cityduplex (aka RER NG) – RER (Paris/Île-de-France), introduced 2023.
- X'Trapolis 100 – Metro Trains Melbourne (Victoria, Australia) and Valparaíso Metro (Chile). Melbourne version introduced in 2002 and Valparaíso version introduced in 2005.
- X'Trapolis Modular – Valparaíso Metro and Metrotrén (Rancagua Express and Nos Express – Santiago, Chile), introduced 2015. Similar to Civia units used on the Renfe Cercanías (Spain).
- X'Trapolis Mega – Metrorail (South Africa), introduced 2017.
- Transperth C-series – Transperth (Perth, Australia), introduced 2024.
- Transwa ADR/ADS class – Transwa (Perth, Australia), diesel-powered variant of the Transperth C-series in production, set to be introduced in 2026 to service the regional Australind railway line.
- X'Trapolis Tsíimin K'áak for Tren Maya (Mexico)
- X'Trapolis 2.0 – Metro Trains Melbourne (Victoria, Australia), introduced on 3 May 2026.
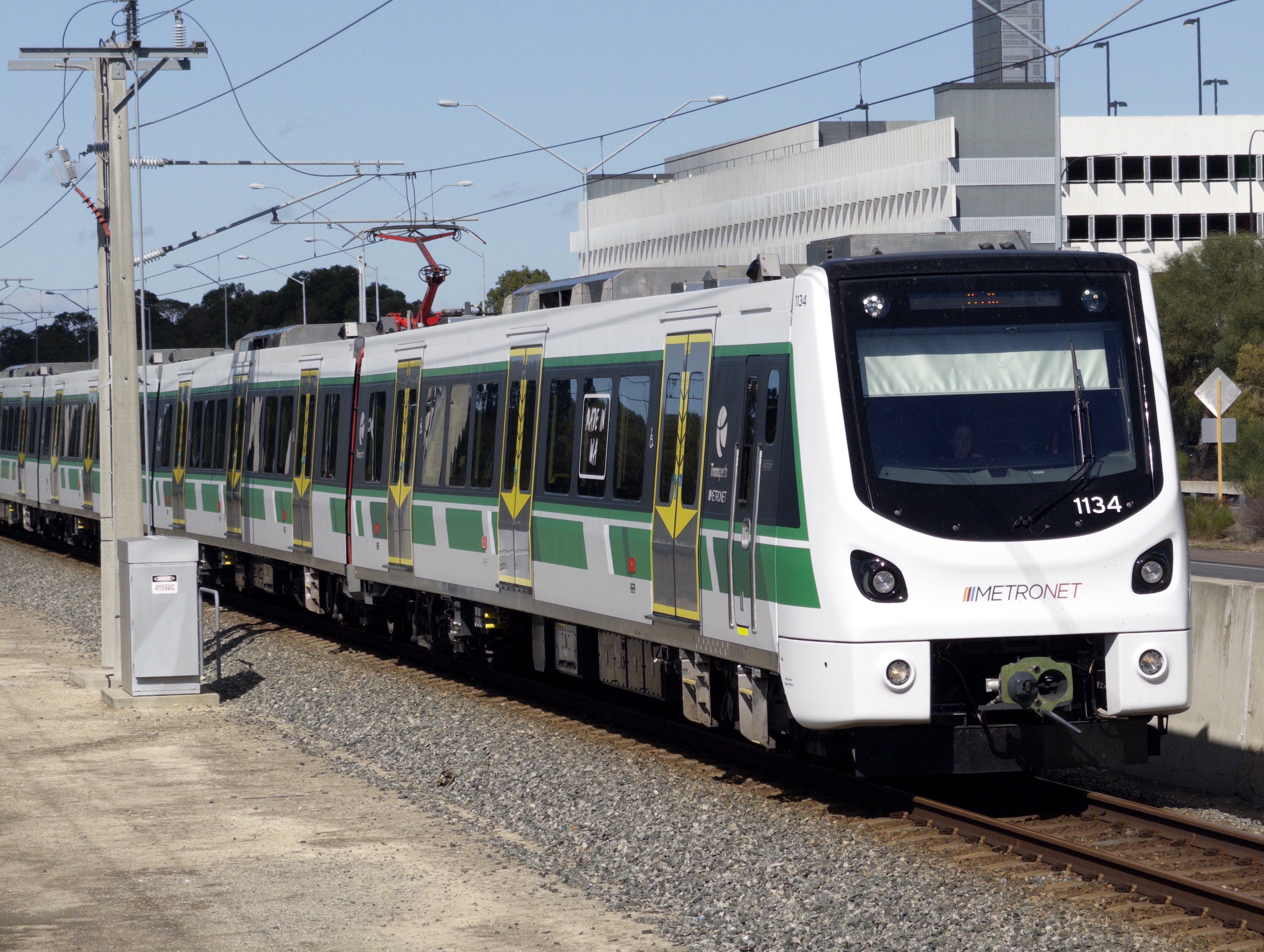
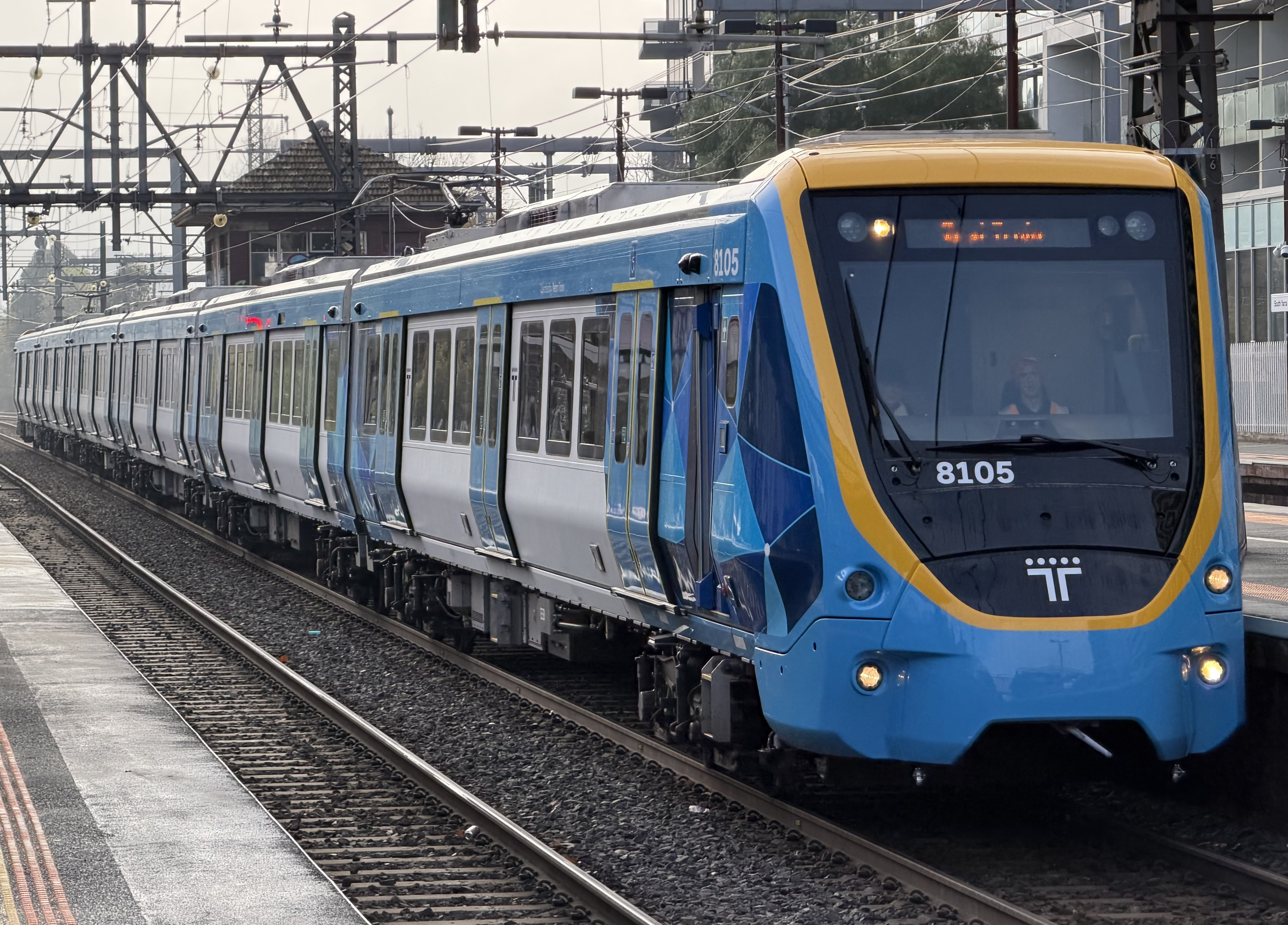
The Transperth C-series (Perth, Western Australia, Australia) (top) and X'Trapolis 2.0 (Melbourne, Victoria Australia) (bottom) have similarities in design and interior to each other.

=== Future ===
- X'Trapolis Ireland (IÉ 90000 Class and 80000 Class) – DART (Dublin, Ireland, Irish gauge) First train delivered in 2024, entering into revenue service in 2027. 31 of the 57 units to be battery-electric.
- Tuhono - Metlink (Wellington, New Zealand), ordered September 8, 2025. 18 units, to be battery-electric, for use on outer suburban lines; to enter revenue service in 2030.

=== Cancelled ===
- X'Trapolis UK – Design offered on 15 September 2009 for the Thameslink rolling stock programme. Bid subsequently withdrawn on 22 October of the same year.

== Manufacturing locations of X'Trapolis trains ==
=== Europe ===
==== Barcelona, Spain ====
Production of the X'Trapolis Modular for Chile took place in Barcelona from 2005 to 2013 and again from 2021 to 2022.

==== Česká Lípa, Czech Republic ====
The bodyshells for the RER NG are produced in Česká Lípa.

==== Katowice, Poland ====
Production for Irish Rail's 90000 Class units started in 2024. They will be used on the operator's DART+ network in the Greater Dublin area.

The first fully assembled 90000 Class unit was unveiled on November 13, 2024.

==== La Rochelle, France ====
X'Trapolis 100 assembly took place in La Rochelle. Valparaíso's units were all made in the La Rochelle factory while Melbourne's units had their final assembly in Ballarat.

==== Savigliano, Italy ====
Italian trains were assembled in Savigliano, Italy.

==== Valenciennes and Crespin, France ====
Production of the MI 2N, MI 09, and RER NG took place at the factories in Valenciennes and Crespin.

=== Americas ===
==== Ciudad Sahagún, Mexico ====
Production of all X'Trapolis units for Tren Maya happened at the Ciudad Sahagún site.

==== São Paulo, Brazil ====
The first 20 units of the X'Trapolis Mega for Metrorail were manufactured in São Paulo. The first two X'Trapolis Mega bodyshells were assembled at the São Paulo facility in May 2015 with the first São Paulo-built unit delivered in December of that year.

=== Africa ===
==== Dunnottar, Greater Johannesburg, South Africa ====
The remaining 580 of the 600 X'Trapolis Mega for PRASA units are being produced by Gibela in Dunnottar, itself part of the Greater Johannesburg area where the X'Trapolis Mega models are used.

The first Dunnottar-assembled trains were assembled in April 2019, with the 100th train assembled there being delivered in July 2022.

=== Asia/Oceania ===
==== Ballarat, Australia ====
Final assembly of Melbourne's X'Trapolis 100 units took place in Ballarat unlike in La Rochelle where full assembly of Valparaíso's units took place.

Full assembly of the X'Trapolis 2.0 takes place in the Ballarat North Workshops. The first unit was completed in November 2024.

==== Bellevue, Australia ====
Transperth's C-series trains and TransWA's ADR/ADS class railcars are partially constructed in Bellevue, Western Australia as part of a 50% local content target.

==== Savli, India ====
The X'Trapolis Tūhono trains are to operate in the lower North Island from Wellington to Masterton and Palmerston North. They are to be produced in Alstom's Savli plant later in the decade, and are to begin service in 2030.

==== Sri City, India ====
TransWA's ADR/ADS class railcars are constructed in Sri City and then shipped to and assembled in Bellevue, Western Australia
