= Altéo =

Double-deck trainsets operated on the French RER A line

MI 2N "Altéo" (Class Z 1500)
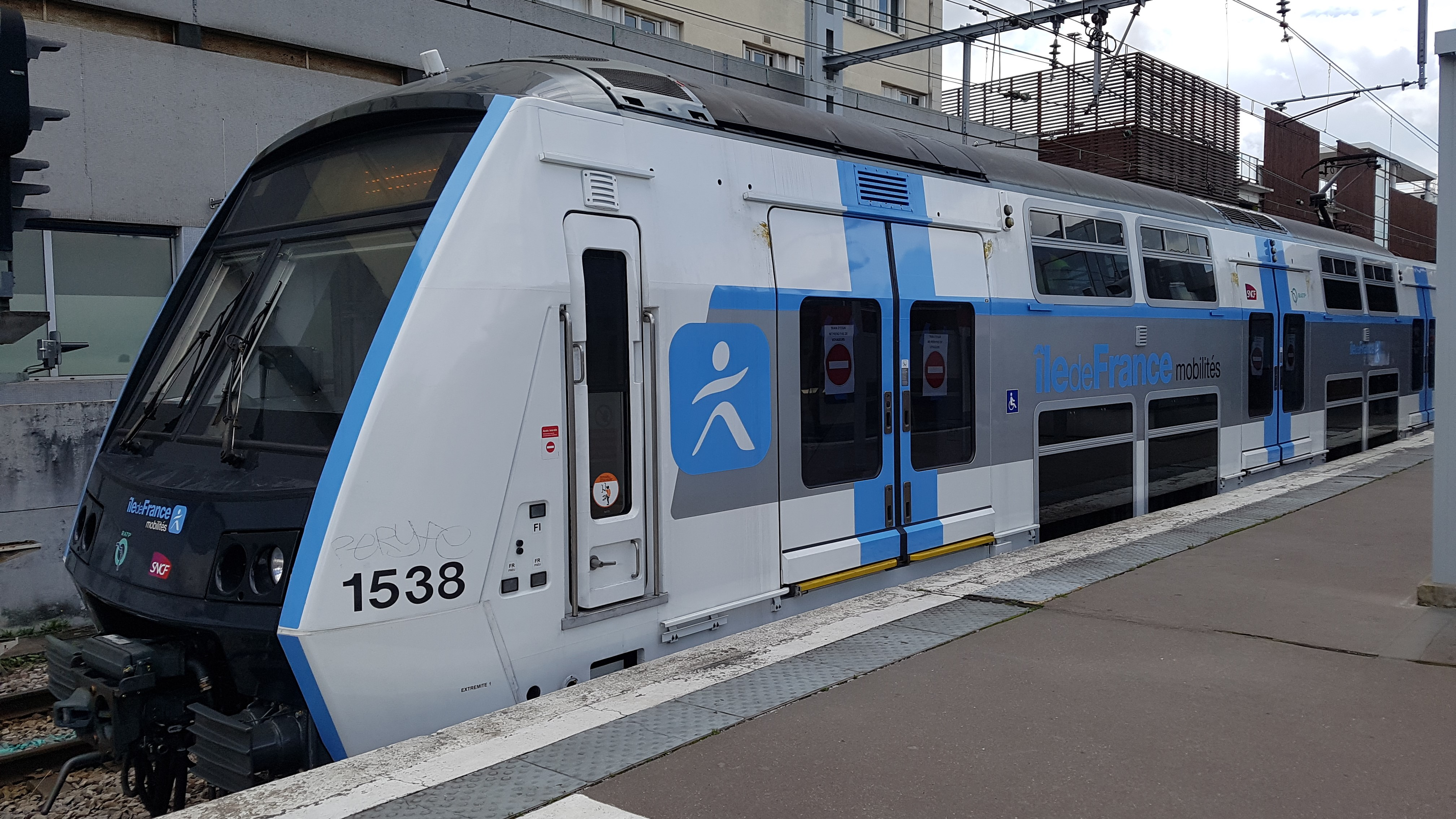
- A refurbished MI 2N "Altéo" at Boissy-Saint-Léger on the RER A line.
- In service: 6 June 1997–present
- Manufacturers: GEC Alsthom and ANF
- Family name: MI 2N, X'Trapolis
- Constructed: 1995–2005
- Entered service: 6 June 1997
- Refurbished: 2019–2021 (expected)
- Number in service: 42 trainsets (210 cars)
- Number scrapped: 1
- Formation: 5 cars per trainset (R+M+M+M+R)
- Fleet numbers: Z 1501/2 - Z 1585/6
- Operators: RATP, SNCF
- Depots: Achères; Rueil-Malmaison; Sucy-en-Brie; Torcy
- Line served: RER RER A

Specifications
- Car body construction: Stainless steel
- Train length: 112 m (367 ft 5 in)
- Car length: 22 m (72 ft 2 in)
- Width: 2.9 m (9 ft 6 in)
- Height: 4.32 m (14 ft 2 in)
- Doors: 2 × 3 per car
- Maximum speed: 120 km/h (75 mph)
- Weight: 288 t (283 long tons; 317 short tons)
- Traction system: GEC Alstom GTO CSI
- Traction motors: 12 × 325 kW (436 hp) 4 FXA 3561 asynchronous, 550 V, force ventilated
- Power output: 3,900 kW (5,230 hp)
- Tractive effort: 350 kN
- Acceleration: 1.15 m/s^{2} (3.8 ft/s^{2})
- Deceleration: 1.15 m/s^{2} (3.8 ft/s^{2}) (service); 1.25 m/s^{2} (4.1 ft/s^{2}) (emergency)
- Power supply: 380 V/50 Hz
- Electric systems: Overhead line: 25 kV 50 Hz AC; 1,500 V DC
- Current collection: Pantograph (type AX 25)
- UIC classification: 2′2′+Bo′Bo′+Bo′Bo′+Bo′Bo′+2′2′
- Braking systems: Regenerative, disc and electrodynamic Eddy current brake
- Safety system: SACEM
- Coupling system: Scharfenberg type
- Track gauge: 1,435 mm (4 ft 8 1/2 in) standard gauge

The MI 2N "Altéo" (French: Matériel d'Interconnexion à 2 Niveaux, lit. 'two-level interconnection rolling stock'), also designated Class Z 1500, is a double-deck, dual-voltage electric multiple unit (EMU) operated on RER A, part of the Réseau Express Régional (RER), a hybrid suburban commuter and rapid transit system serving Paris and the surrounding Île-de-France region.

The MI 2N "Altéo" is the version of the MI 2N series developed for the RATP Group. It closely resembles the SNCF Class Z 22500 (MI 2N "Éole") operated by SNCF, although the two variants differ in their motorization and interior layout.

A total of 43 five-car trainsets were built by a consortium of Alstom (then GEC Alsthom) and Bombardier. Final assembly took place at Alstom's facility in Valenciennes and Bombardier's plant in Crespin between 1995 and 2005. The first unit entered service in 1996.

The development of the MI 2N was driven by the need to increase capacity on RER A, one of the busiest rail lines in the world. Each trainset can accommodate up to 2,600 passengers, significantly more than the approximately 1,887 passengers carried by the single-deck trains previously in use. Due to the success of the MI 2N, RATP later ordered 140 MI 09 trainsets, an updated version of the design, from the same Alstom–Bombardier consortium.

== History ==
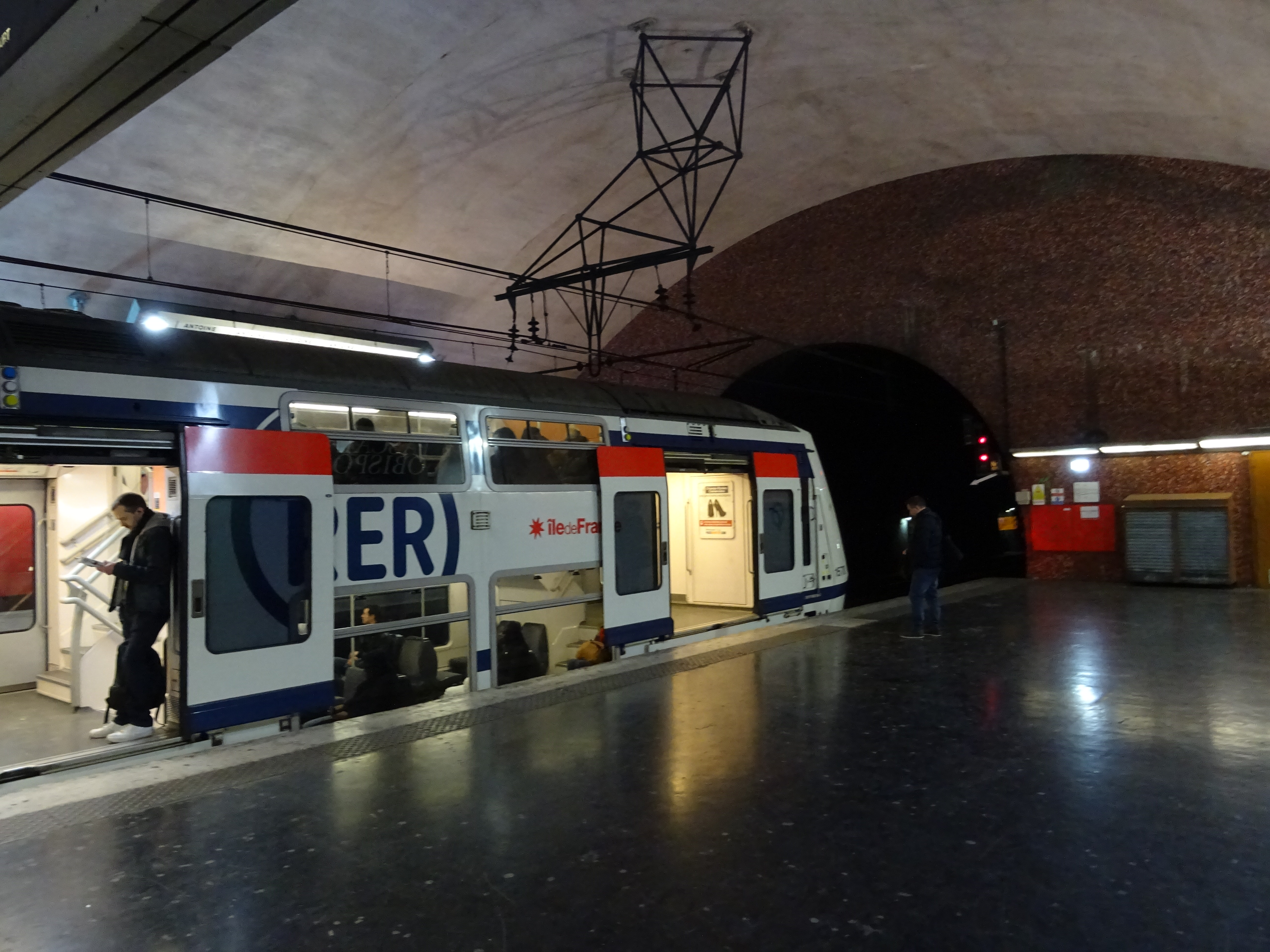
MI 2N "Altéo" train stopped at Nation station, showing the wide entry doors, level boarding and stairs to upper and lower decks

The Réseau Express Régional (RER) is a hybrid suburban commuter and rapid transit system serving Paris and its suburbs. The RER A line is, by far, the busiest in the system and is the busiest single rail line outside of East Asia, serving over 1.2 million passengers per day.

The line started experiencing rapid growth in the 1980s, with traffic increasing by 9% per year on average. In an effort to relieve overcrowding on the line, the RATP began installing the SACEM electronic train control system (which enabled extremely short spacing between trains) and started looking at purchasing double-deck trains.

Double-deck trains, like the Z 2N series (Class Z 5600 and Class Z 8800) were already in use on suburban SNCF networks and could carry up to 2,600 people per train, compared to 1,887 people on the single-deck MS 61 trains that had been used on the RER A since it opened.

At about the same time, the RATP started construction of the Paris Metro Line 14, and SNCF started construction of the RER E line. Both would parallel the RER A in central Paris.

That left the RATP and the SNCF looking for new equipment for the RER A and E lines, so in 1989 they decided to team up and issue a call for tenders. In 1992, they placed an order for 17 MI 2N trainsets from a consortium of French manufacturer Alstom (at the time known as GEC Alstom) and Canadian conglomerate Bombardier. The MI 2N would be based on the design of SNCF's Class Z 20500 trains being built by the same consortium for RER C and RER D lines, but with modifications to make them better suited to the busy RER A line, most notably three wide doors on each side of the cars (the Z 2N only had two).

The RATP trains for the RER A would be called the MI 2N "Altéo", while the SNCF trains for the RER E would be called the Class Z 22500, also known as the MI 2N "Eole" (EOLE was the name of the RER E during construction). The two trains look very similar from the outside, but the "Altéo" trains for the RER A would feature three motors per trainset for faster acceleration, while the "Eole" trains would only have two motors, and would eliminate the stairs between the upper deck and the center vestibule in favor of having 22 additional seats per train.

A pre-production train was delivered in 1996 for joint testing by both RATP and SNCF. The first order of 17 trainsets was delivered between 1997 and 1999, and the first train was put into service on 6 June 1997. RATP proceeded with a second option order of 12 trainsets, delivered between 2001 and 2002, and a third option order of 14 trainsets, delivered between 2003 and 2005.

The double-deck trains proved so successful and popular that operators of the RER A went on to purchase 140 MI 09 trainsets, an improved version of the MI 2N built by the same Alstom-Bombardier consortium.

Departure sound Mi2N Altéo from the outside at Châtelet–Les Halles

=== Renovations ===
Starting in 2019, the 43 MI 2N Altéo trains are scheduled to undergo a renovation project that will modernize the cars' interior (replacement of seats and floor coverings, improved lighting, new multi-purpose areas), the installation of a video surveillance system, the improvement of accessibility for passengers with reduced mobility (adding a call button for passengers in wheelchairs and improved loudspeaker system) and the improvement of the on-board passenger information system. The exterior of the train will also receive the new Île-de-France Mobilités livery (grey, white and light blue) that other forms of public transportation in Paris are now receiving. The €134 million renovation contract was awarded to CAF and will be paid for by RATP and Île-de-France Mobilités. The first renovated trains are expected to enter revenue service by early 2023.

== Description ==
Altéos are able to operate on two different types of electrical power: RATP's 1.5 kV DC network and SNCF's 25 kV AC network. The trains primarily operate using 1.5 kV DC, except when operating over the western A3 and A5 branches (between Houilles–Carrières-sur-Seine station and Cergy-le-Haut station or Poissy station).

Altéos made their commercial debut on 6 June 1997. 43 trainsets with a total of 215 cars were built for the RER A line.

== Fleet ==
The MI 2N Altéo fleet consists of 43 trainsets. All are in service on RER Line A and assigned to the RATP depots at Achères, Rueil-Malmaison, Sucy-en-Brie, and Torcy.

Each trainset follows a 3M2T formation (three powered cars and two non-powered trailers):

RER A	← Cergy-le-Haut/Poissy/Saint-Germain-en-Laye Boissy-Saint-Léger/Marne-la-Vallée–Chessy →				
Car No.	1 >	2	3	4	< 5
Type	Trailer	Motor	Motor	Motor	Trailer
Numbering	ZRBx 1501–1585 (odd numbers)	ZBx 2501–2585 (odd numbers)	ZB 3501–3543 (trainset number)	ZAB 2502–2586 (even numbers)	ZRBx 1502–1586 (even numbers)

Cars 1 and 5 are equipped with pantographs, denoted with < and > in the chart above denoting which is in use in each direction.

== Photo gallery ==
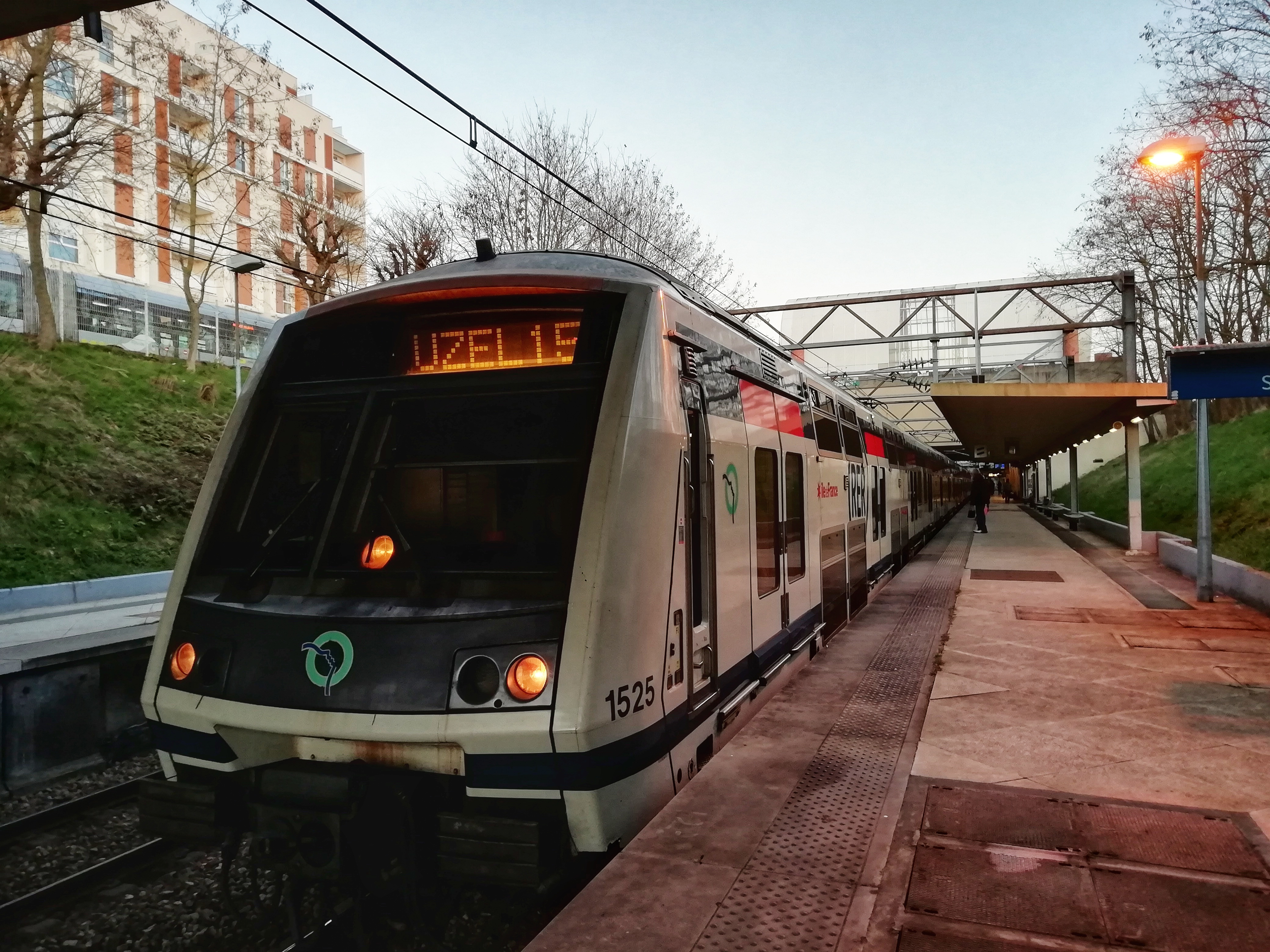
MI 2N "Altéo" boarding passengers at Cergy-Saint-Christophe station

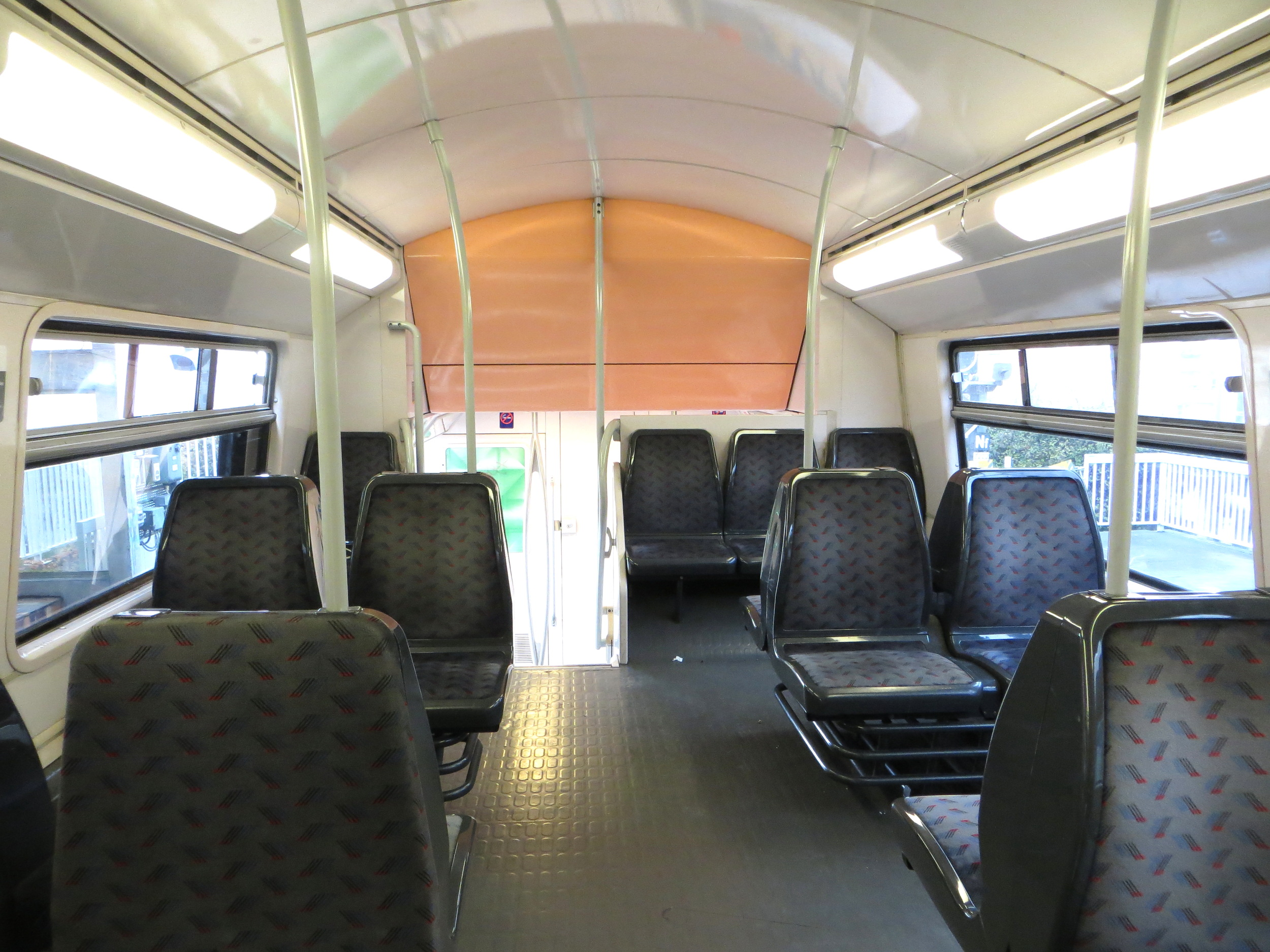
MI 2N "Altéo" interior, upper deck

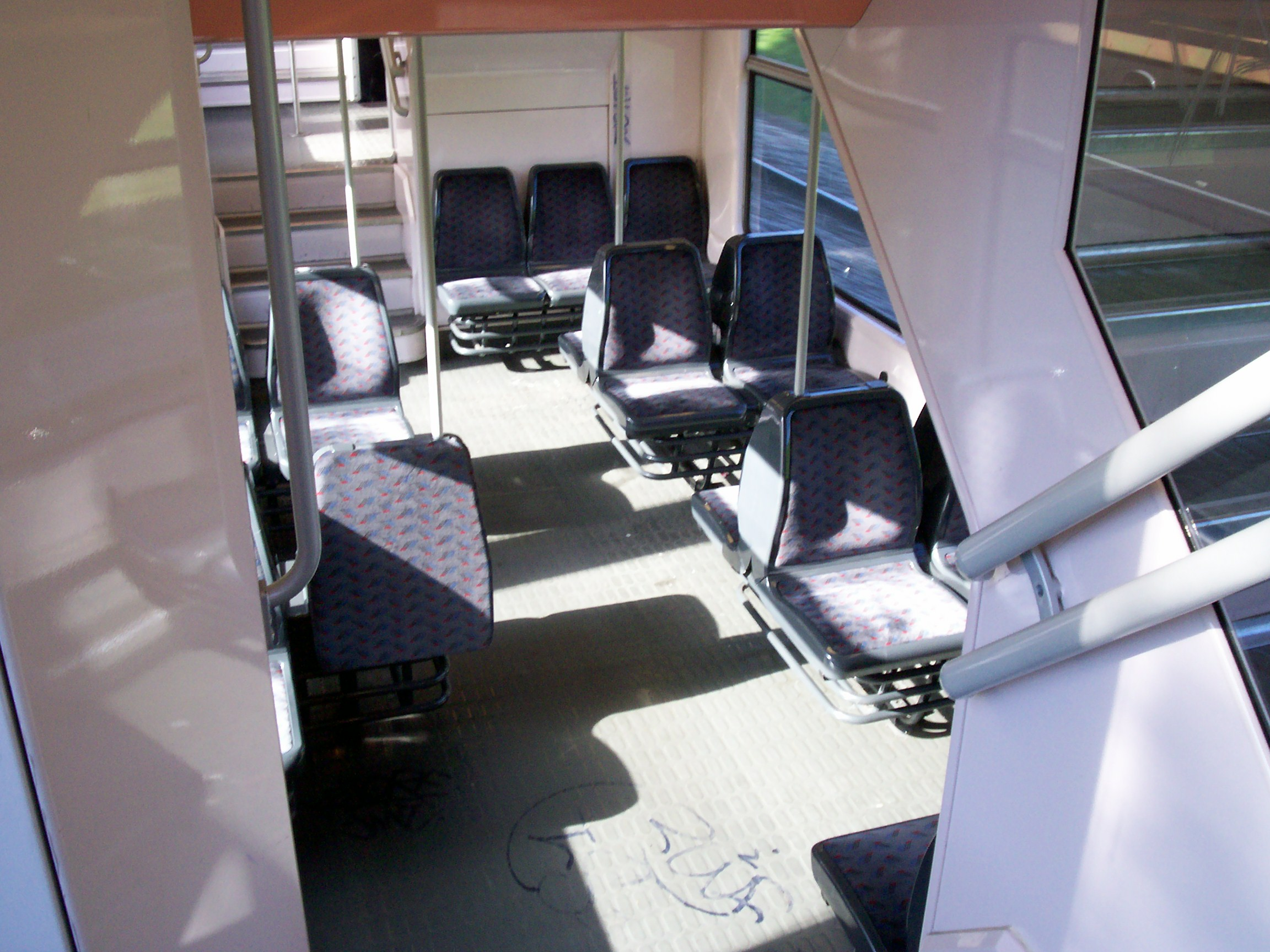
MI 2N "Altéo" interior, lower deck

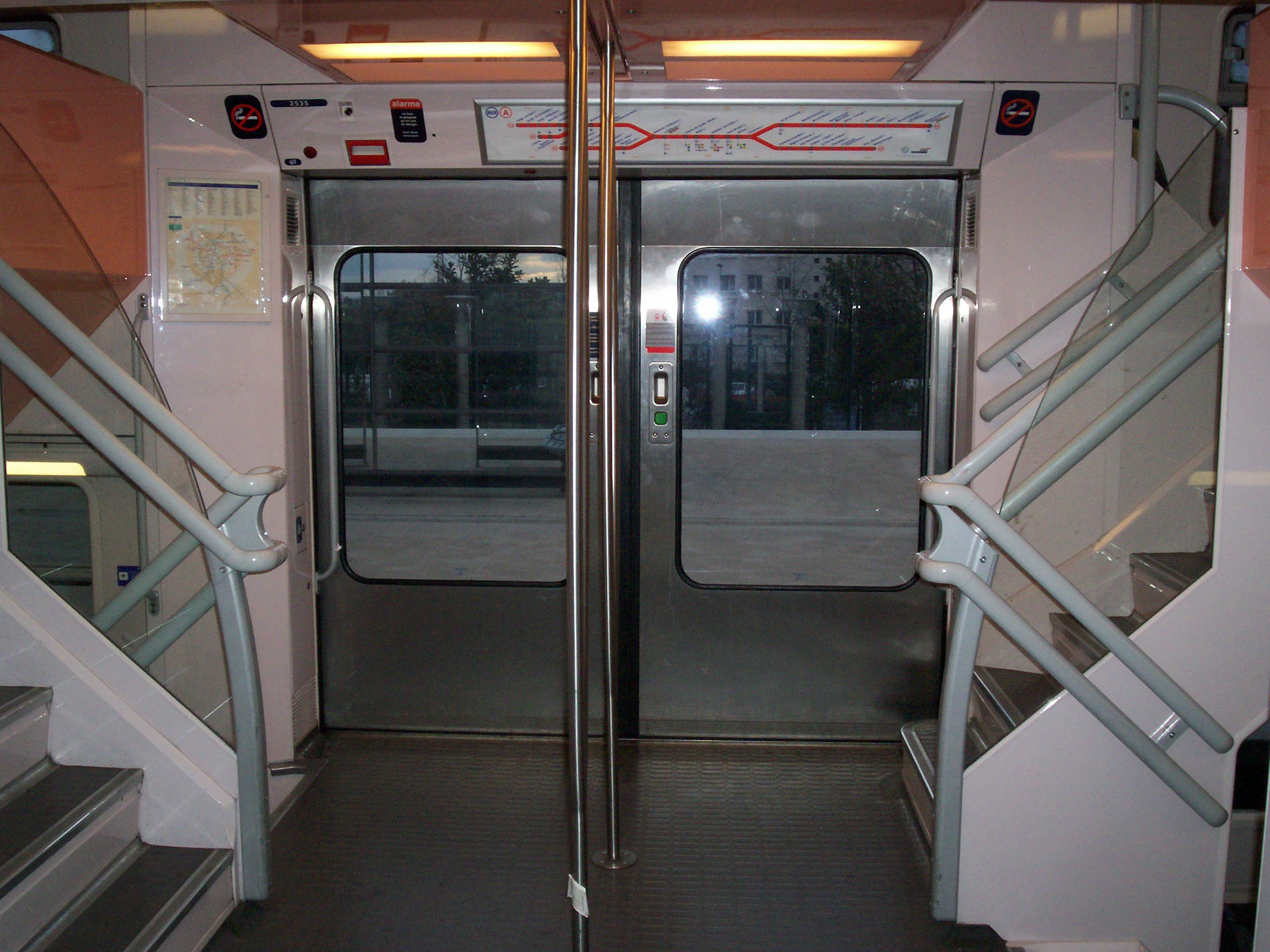
MI 2N "Altéo" interior, mid-deck showing the wide entry doors, and stairs to upper and lower decks

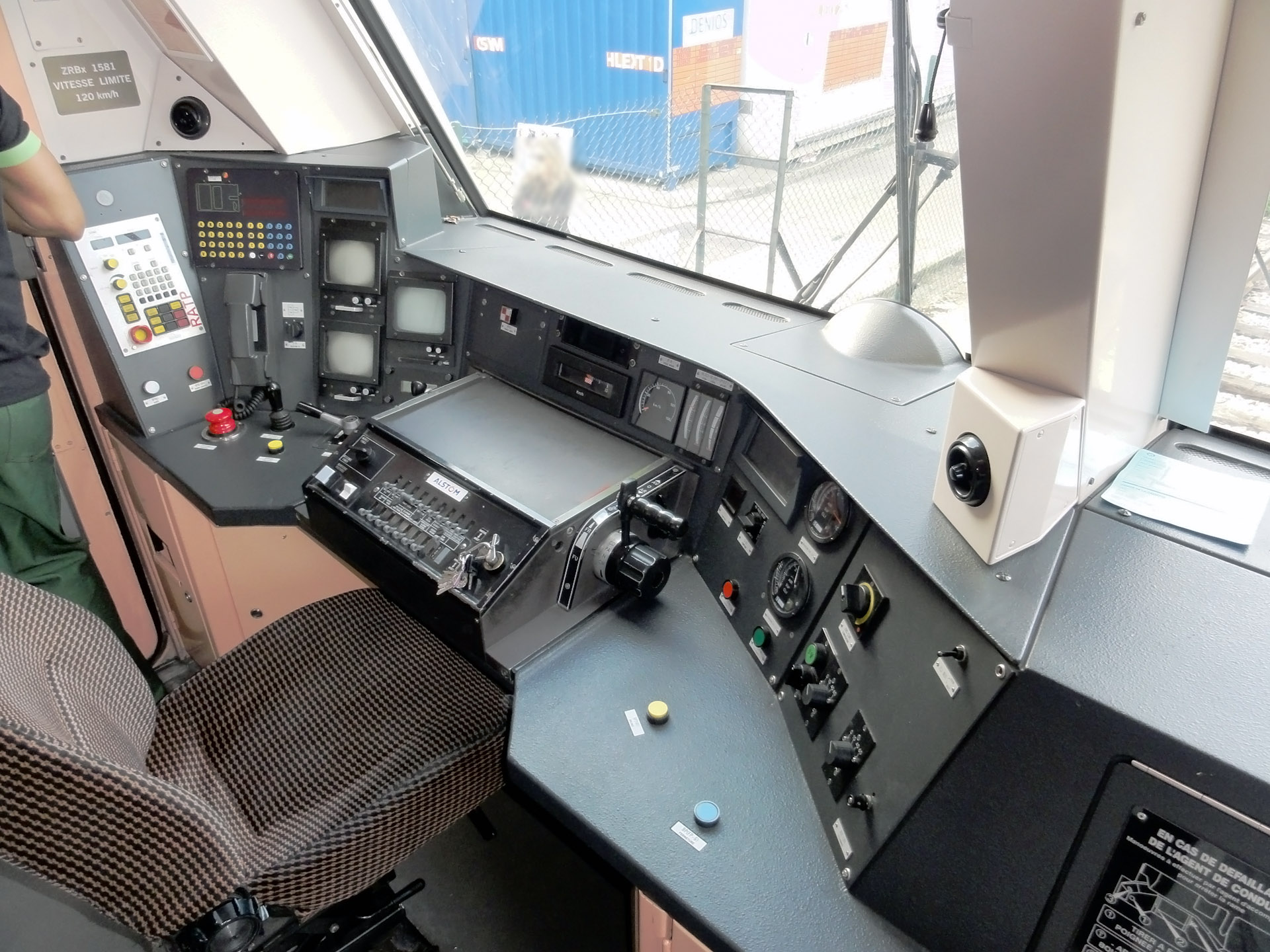
Operators compartment

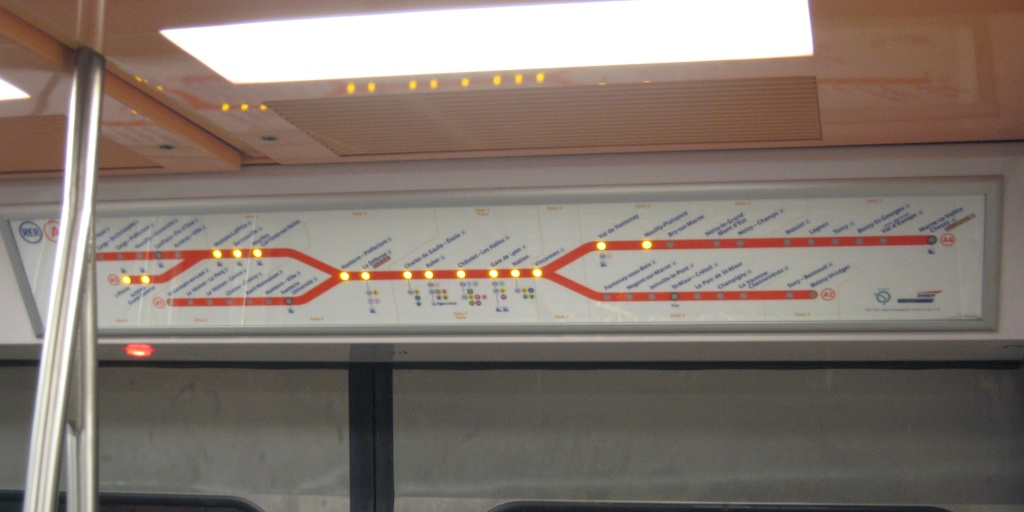
MI 2N "Altéo" interior, mid-deck showing the SISVE lighted route map

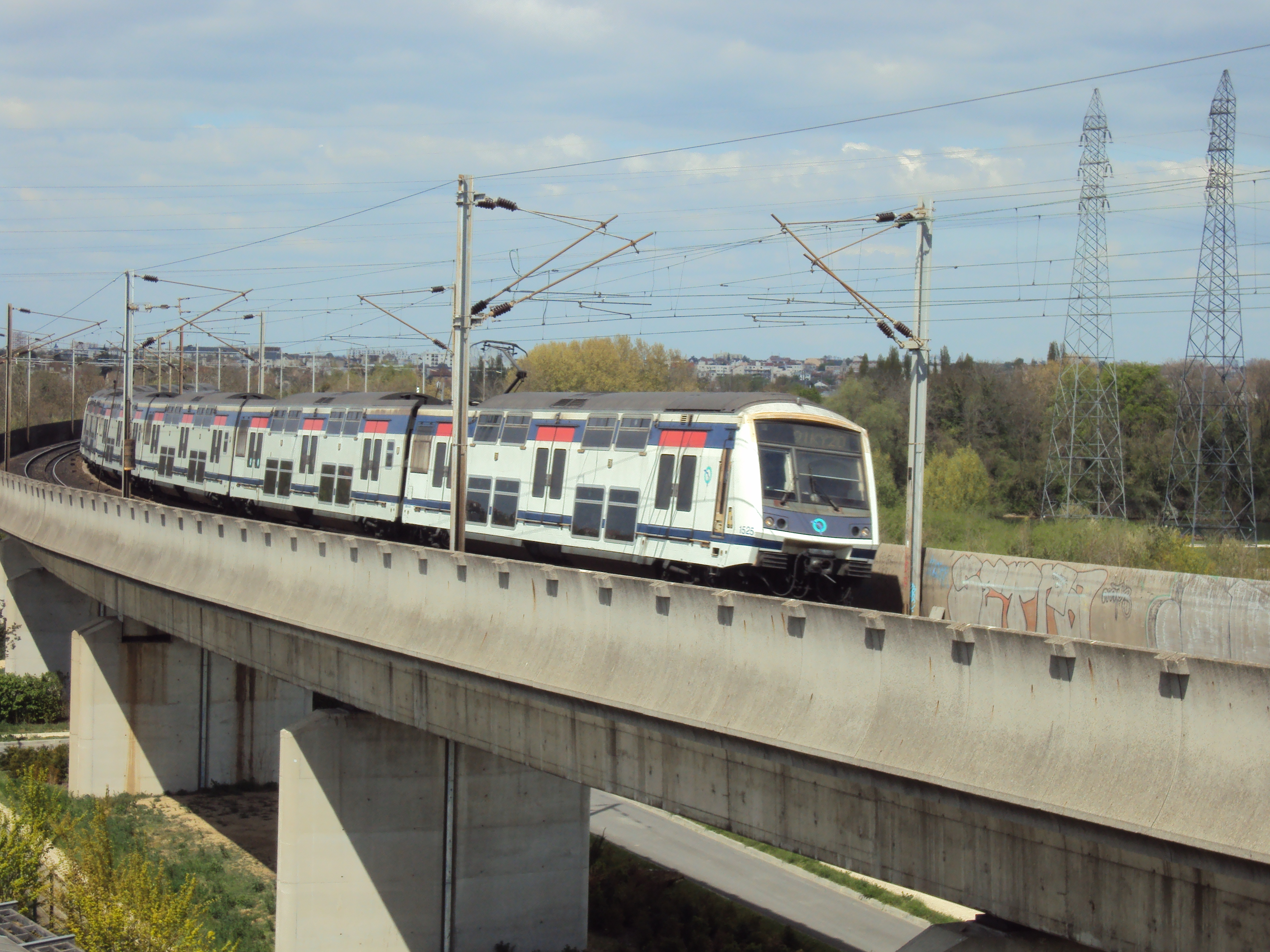
On a viaduct

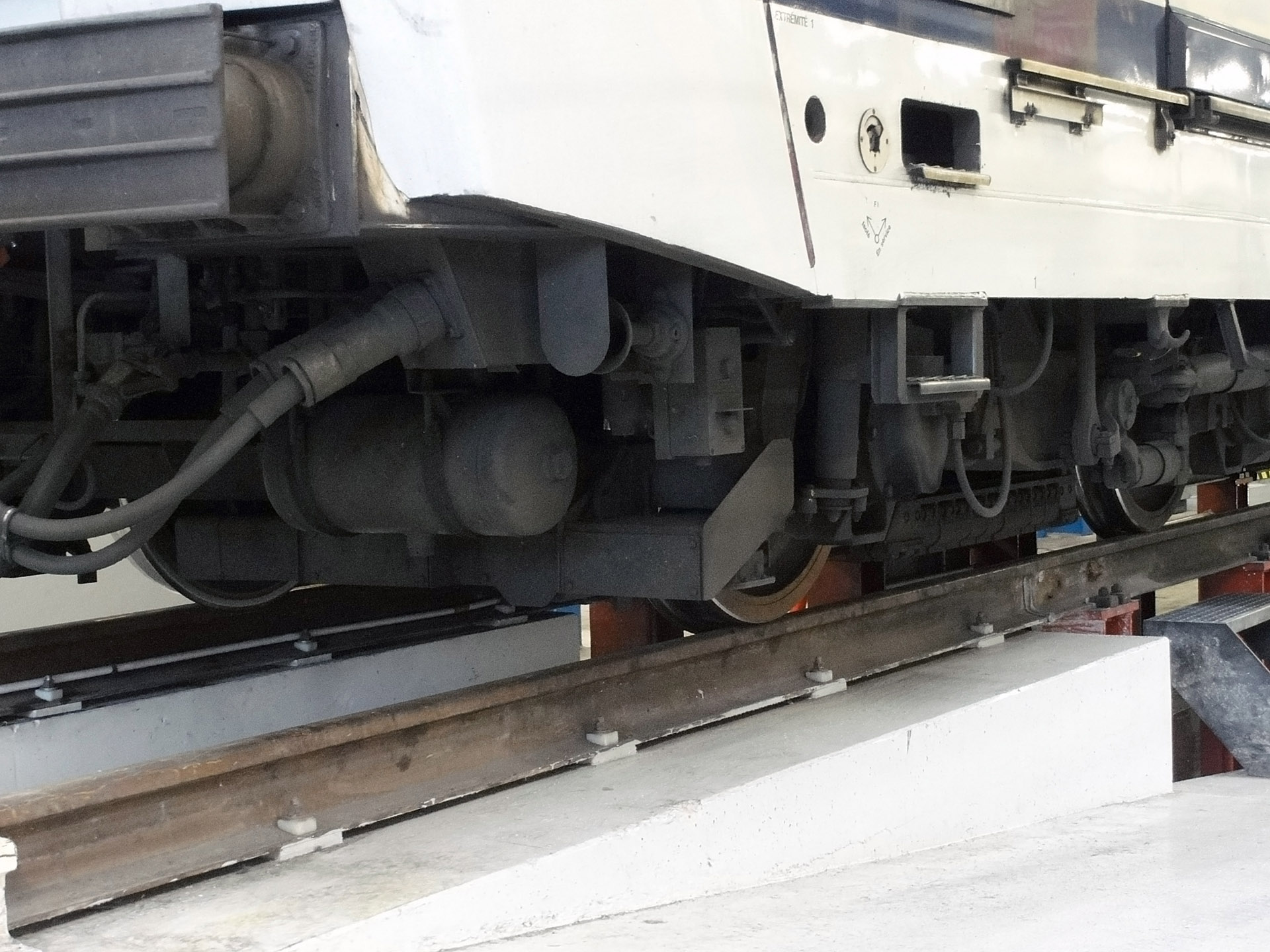
first bogie, we can see the Linear Eddy current brake
