= X'Trapolis Modular =

Single-deck trainsets operated by EFE Central and EFE Valparaíso

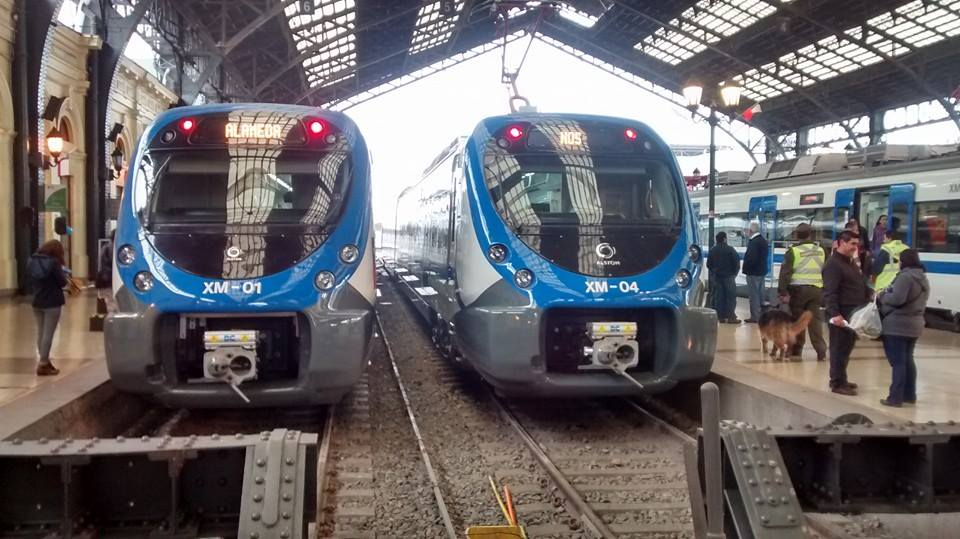
- Stock type: Electric multiple unit
- Manufacturer: Alstom
- Built at: Barcelona, Spain
- Family name: X'Trapolis
- Constructed: 2013-2015, 2021-22
- Number built: 30
- Number in service: 30
- Formation: 2 cars (Mcp-Mc)
- Fleet numbers: XM-01 – XM-30
- Capacity: 424/96 passengers (seated/standing)
- Operator: Empresa de los Ferrocarriles del Estado

Specifications
- Train length: 46 m (150 ft 11 in)
- Width: 2.94 m (9 ft 8 in)
- Height: 4.26 m (14 ft 0 in)
- Doors: 3 per side
- Maximum speed: 143 km/h (89 mph) (design); 120 km/h (75 mph) (service)
- Traction motors: 4 × Alstom 6-LCA-2560 320 kW (430 hp) asynchronous 3-phase AC
- Power output: 1,280 kW (1,720 hp)
- Gearbox: IGW AV2-410-4.85-V03
- Gear ratio: 1:4.85 (2-stage reduction)
- Electric systems: 3 kV DC (nominal) from overhead catenary
- Current collection: Pantograph
- UIC classification: Bo′(2)′Bo′
- Wheels driven: 8 out of 12
- Safety systems: ERTMS; ATP; CTC
- Coupling system: Dellner
- Track gauge: 1,676 mm (5 ft 6 in)

The X'Trapolis Modular is an electric multiple unit operated by Empresa de los Ferrocarriles del Estado (EFE) in Chile. The trains are part of Alstom's X'Trapolis family and were built at the company's Barcelona plant from 2013 to 2015 and again from 2021 to 2022.

== Overview ==
=== History ===
In 2012, a framework was announced for the Rancagura Express service operated by EFE. Alstom, CAF, and Talgo participated in the tender. In October of that year it was revealed that the tender was given to Alstom. The initial order consisted of 12 trainsets, worth $68 million, all of which went to the Rancagua Express service.

The trains were built in the Santa Perpètua de Mogoda municipality of Barcelona, Spain. They were sent to the Port of Bilbao to be shipped to San Antonio, Chile.

The first train was sent from the Port of Bilbao on September 10, 2013. At the same time an additional 12 trains were ordered, with 4 more units going to the Rancagua Express and 8 units going to the Valparaíso Metro. It marked the first time in more than 40 years that the Rancagua Express received newly built trainsets.

The first train for the Rancagua Express arrived in San Antonio on October 19, 2013. Right after the train arrived it was transported to the San Eugenio workshop. The Valparaíso Metro's first two trains arrived in May of 2015. After all the units for the Valparaiso Metro arrived and testing finished the Valparaiso Metro sets entered service in December of that year.

An additional 6 trains were built for the Rancagua Express, with the total number of trains going up to 30. It was part of an expansion of the Rancagua Express' fleet. The first 2 of the 6 trains were shipped from the Port of Bilbao in January 2022, with all 6 eventually being brought to Chile in October of that year.

== Design and features ==
Despite being part of the X'Trapolis family, it uses design elements from Civia units built by CAF and Siemens and operated by Renfe in Spain. The X'Trapolis Modular features 6 doors per car, exterior side screens, and 2 power cars. These features are shared with the X'Trapolis 100.

The X'Trapolis Modular has a standing capacity of 96 and a seated capacity of 502.

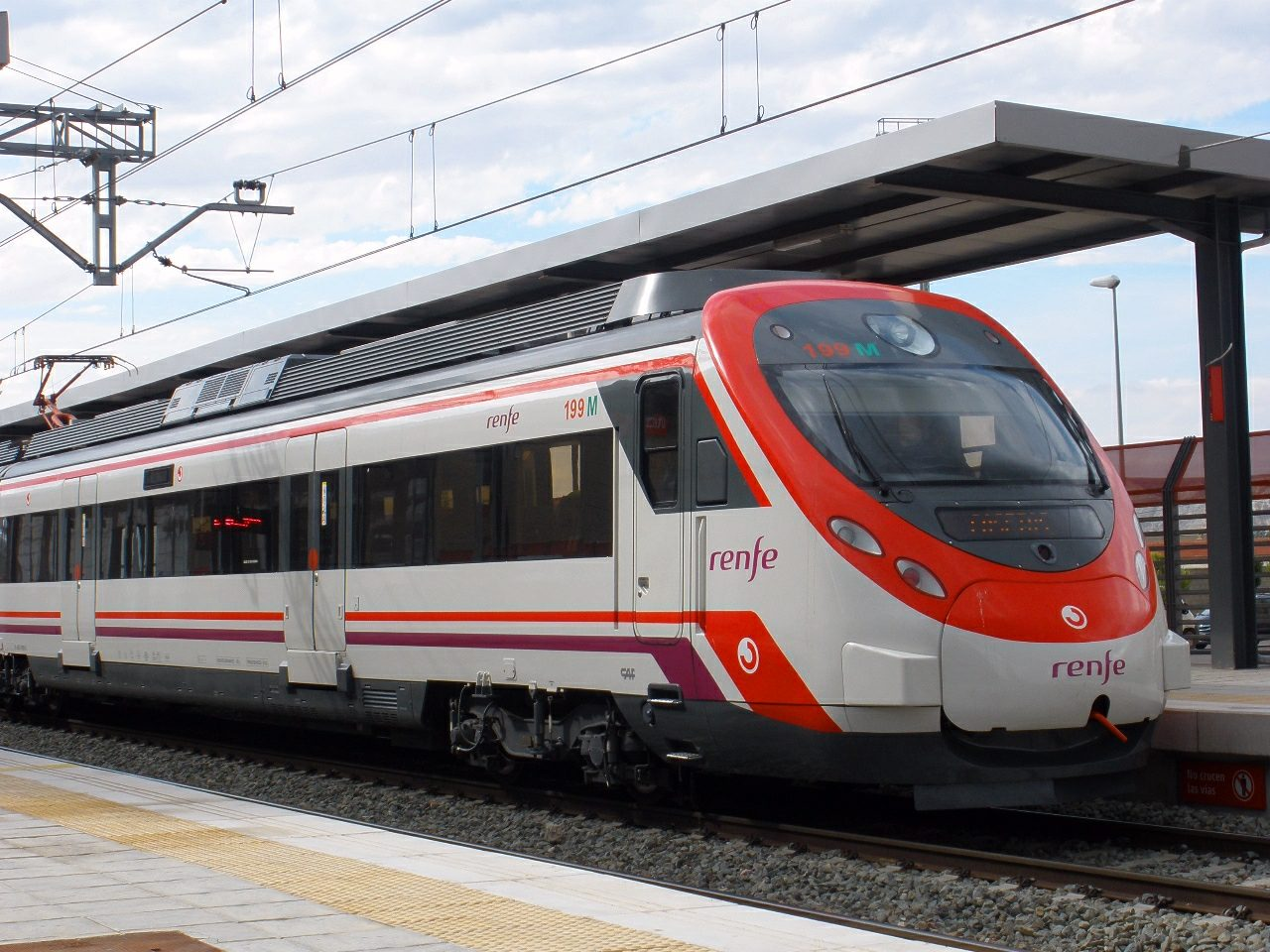
Civia 463 of Renfe

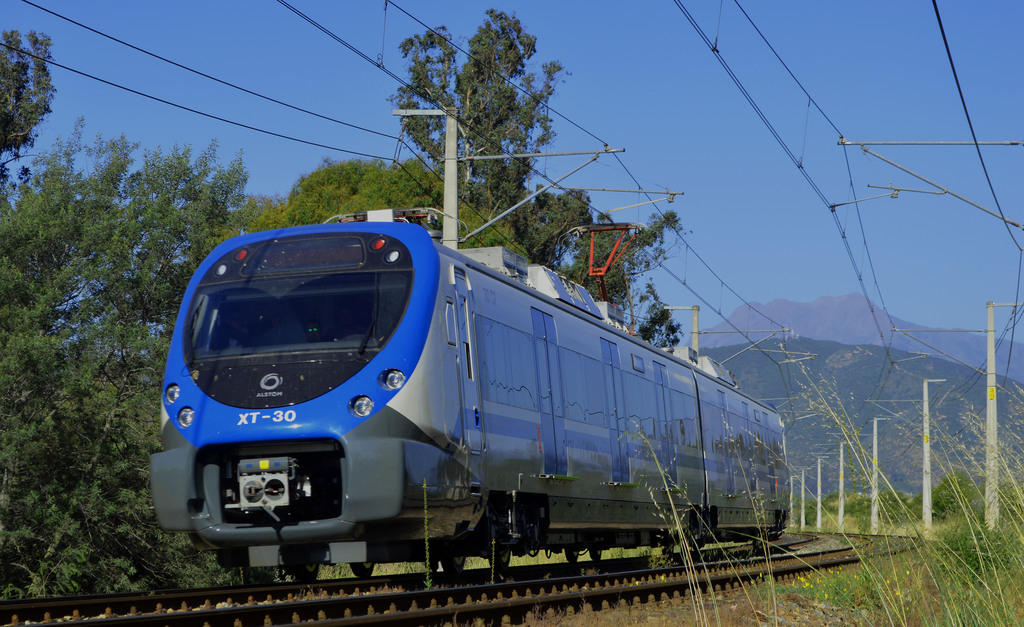
X'Trapolis Modular of EFE

The X'Trapolis Modular (right) and Civia (left) use a similar front end design.
