= SACEM (railway system) =

French train protection system

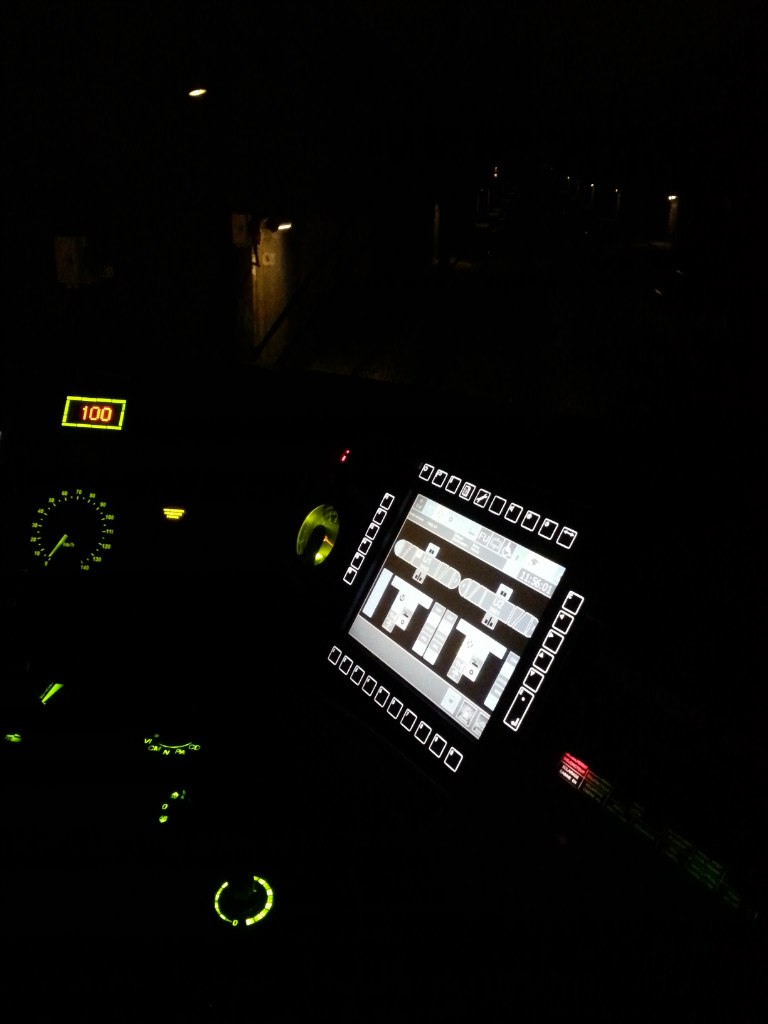
SACEM cab signalling (far left) on the MI 09, showing a speed limit of 100 km/h (62 mph)

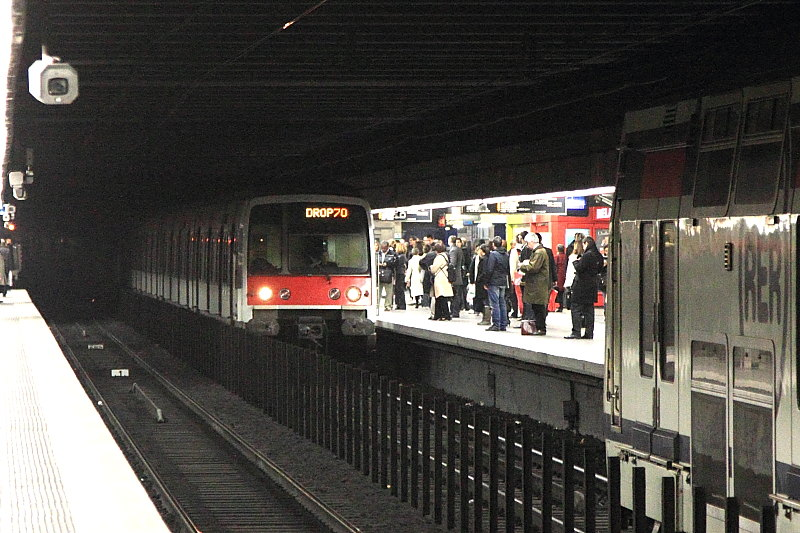
A situation authorized by SACEM, an MI 84 trainset enters Auber station while an Altéo trainset has not completely cleared the platform.

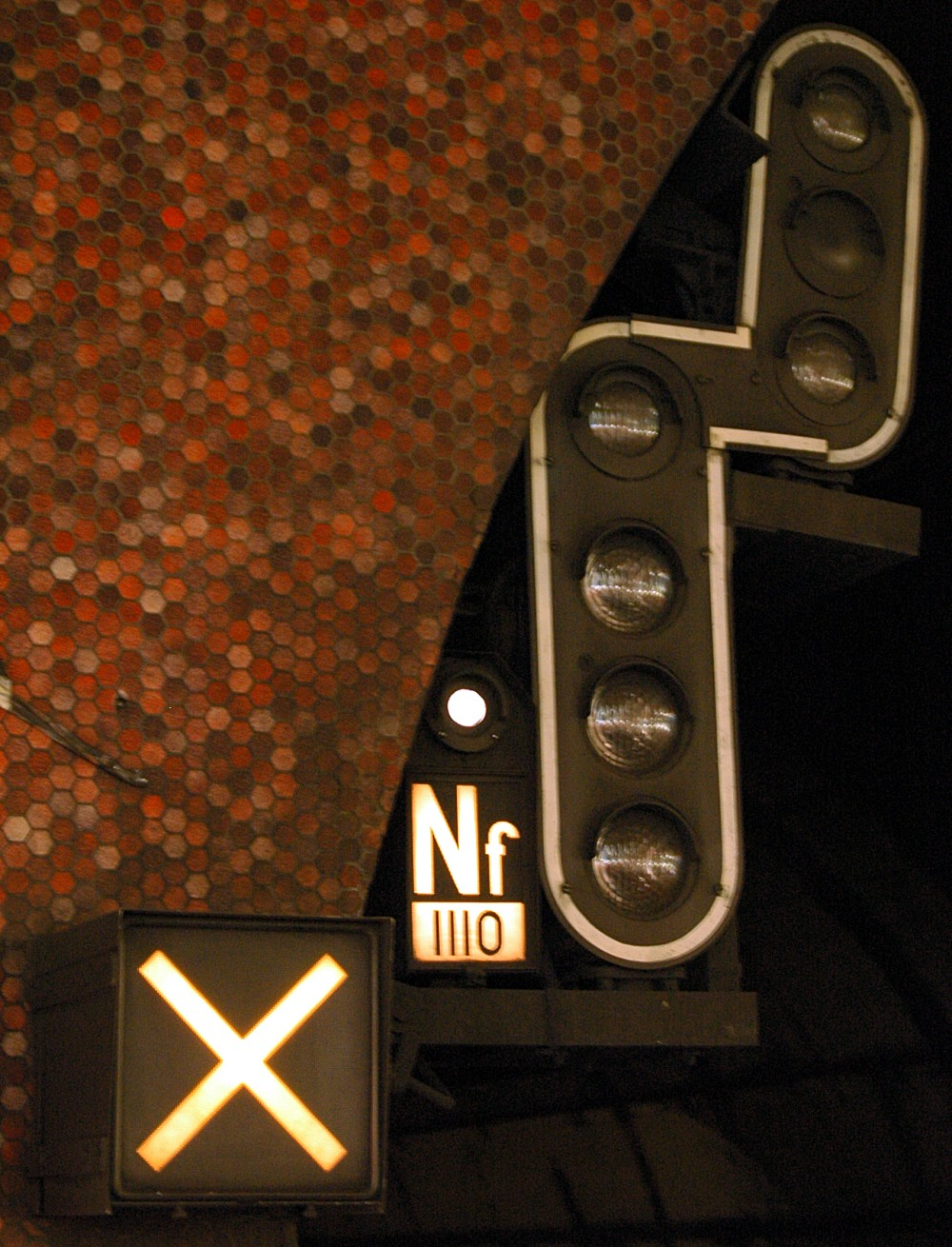
Lineside signal on RER A taken over by SACEM, as indicated by a St. Andrew's Cross (⨯)

The Système d'aide à la conduite, à l'exploitation et à la maintenance (SACEM) is an embedded, automatic speed train protection system for rapid transit railways. The name means "Driver Assistance, Operation, and Maintenance System".

It was developed in France by GEC-Alsthom, Matra (now part of Siemens Mobility) and CSEE (now part of Hitachi Rail STS) in the 1980s. It was first deployed on the RER A suburban railway in Paris in 1989.

Afterwards it was installed:

- on the Santiago Metro in Santiago, Chile;
- on some of the MTR lines in Hong Kong (Kwun Tong line, Tsuen Wan line, Island line, Tseung Kwan O line, Airport Express and Tung Chung line), all enhanced with ATO,
- on Lines A, B and 8 of the Mexico City Metro lines in Mexico City; and
- on Shanghai Metro Line 3.

In 2017 the SACEM system in Paris was enhanced with Automatic Train Operation (ATO) and was put in full operation at the end of 2018.

The SACEM system in Paris is to be enhanced to a fully fledged CBTC system named NExTEO. First to be deployed on the newly-extended line RER E in 2024, it is proposed to replace signalling and control on all RER lines.

== Operation ==
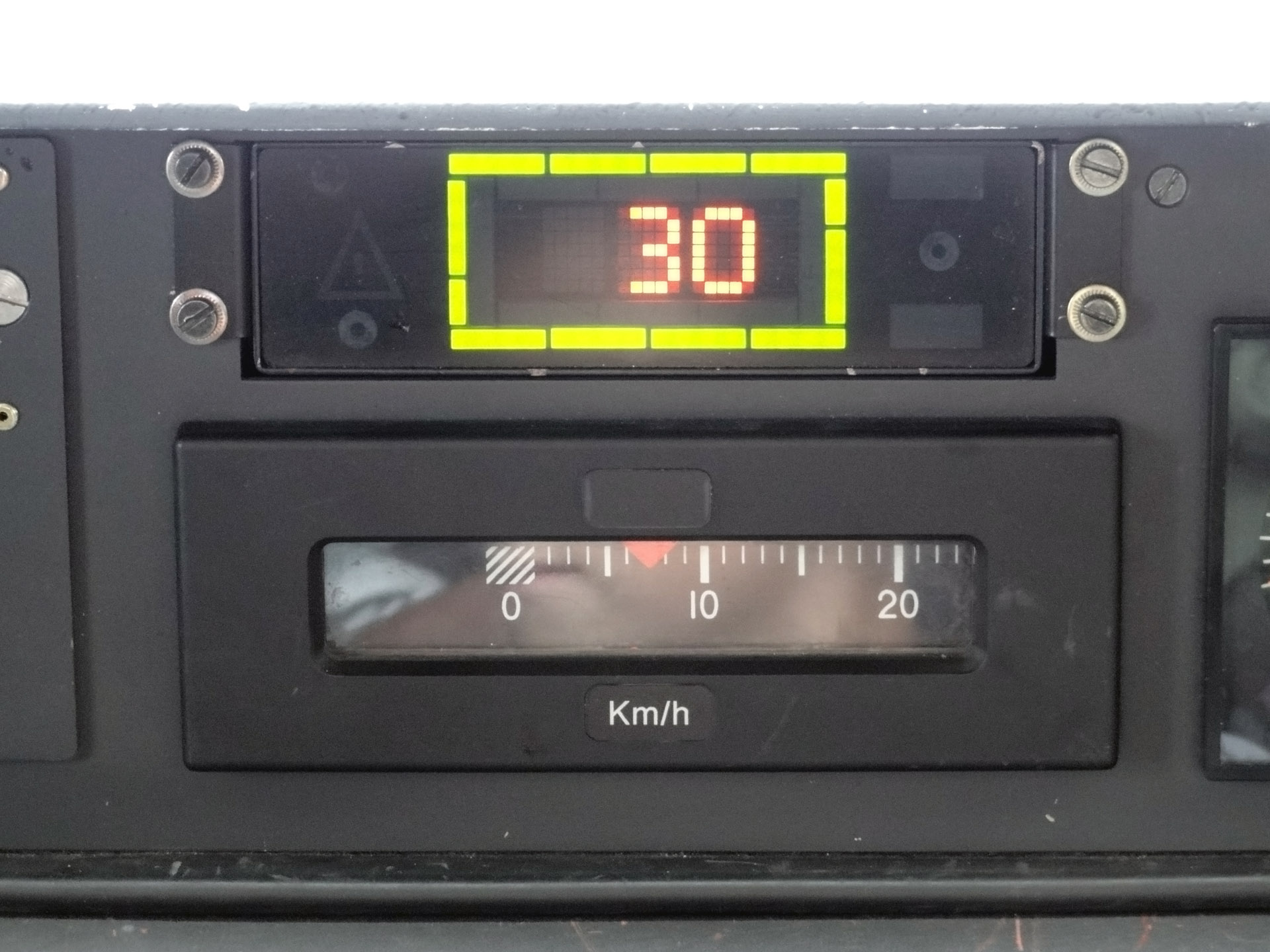
SACEM cab signalling on the MI 2N Altéo, showing a speed limit of 30 km/h (19 mph)

The SACEM system enables a train to receive signals from devices under the tracks. A receiver in the train cabin interprets the signal, and sends data to the console so the driver can see it. A light on the console indicates the speed control setting: an orange light means slow speed, or 30 km/h (19 mph); a red light means full stop. If the driver alters the speed, a warning buzzer may sound. If the system determines that the speed might be unsafe, and the driver does not change it within a few seconds, SACEM engages the emergency brake. SACEM also allows for a reduction in potential train bunching and easier recovery from delays, therefore safely increasing operating frequencies as much as possible especially during rush hour.
