= MI 2N =

Double-deck trainsets operated on the French RER network

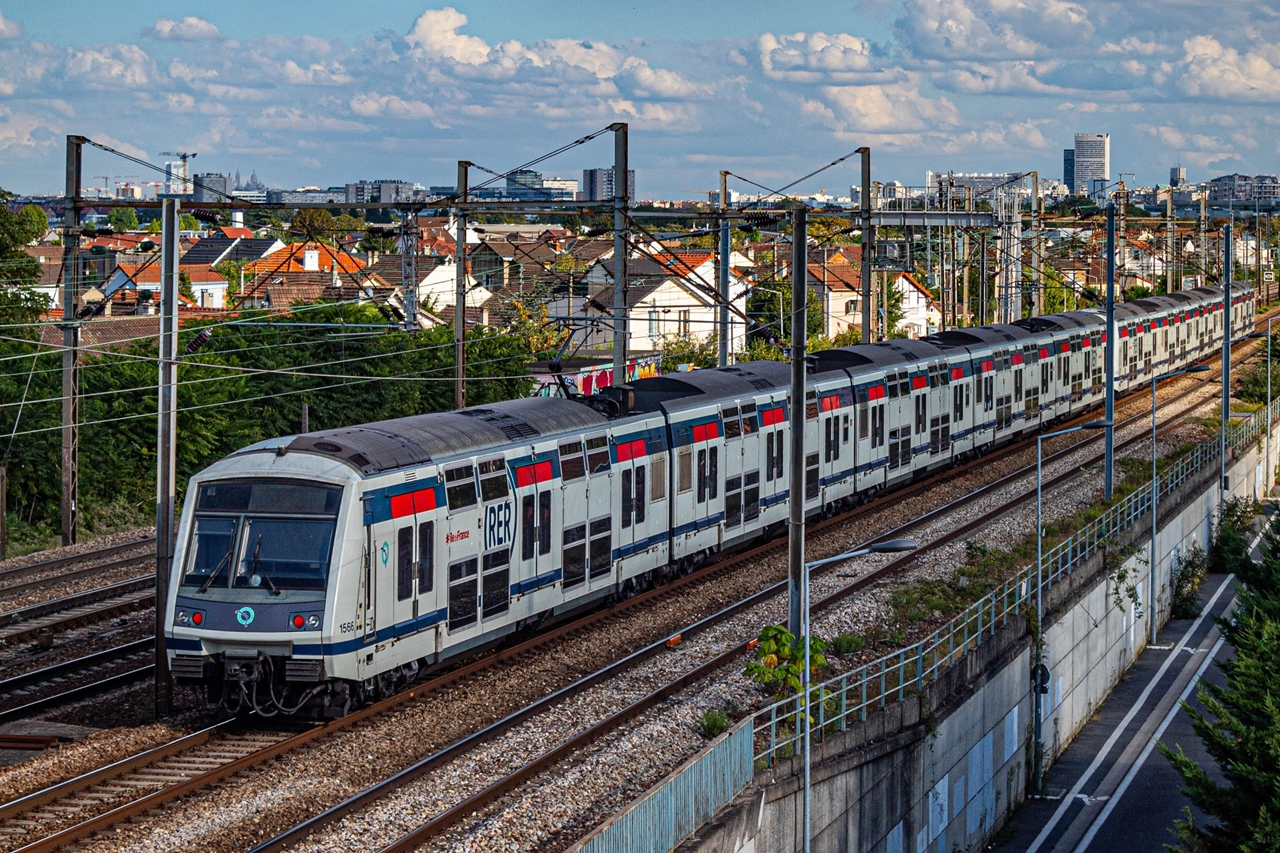
- MI 2N "Altéo" (operated by RATP) departing the Houilles–Carrières-sur-Seine station on the RER A line.

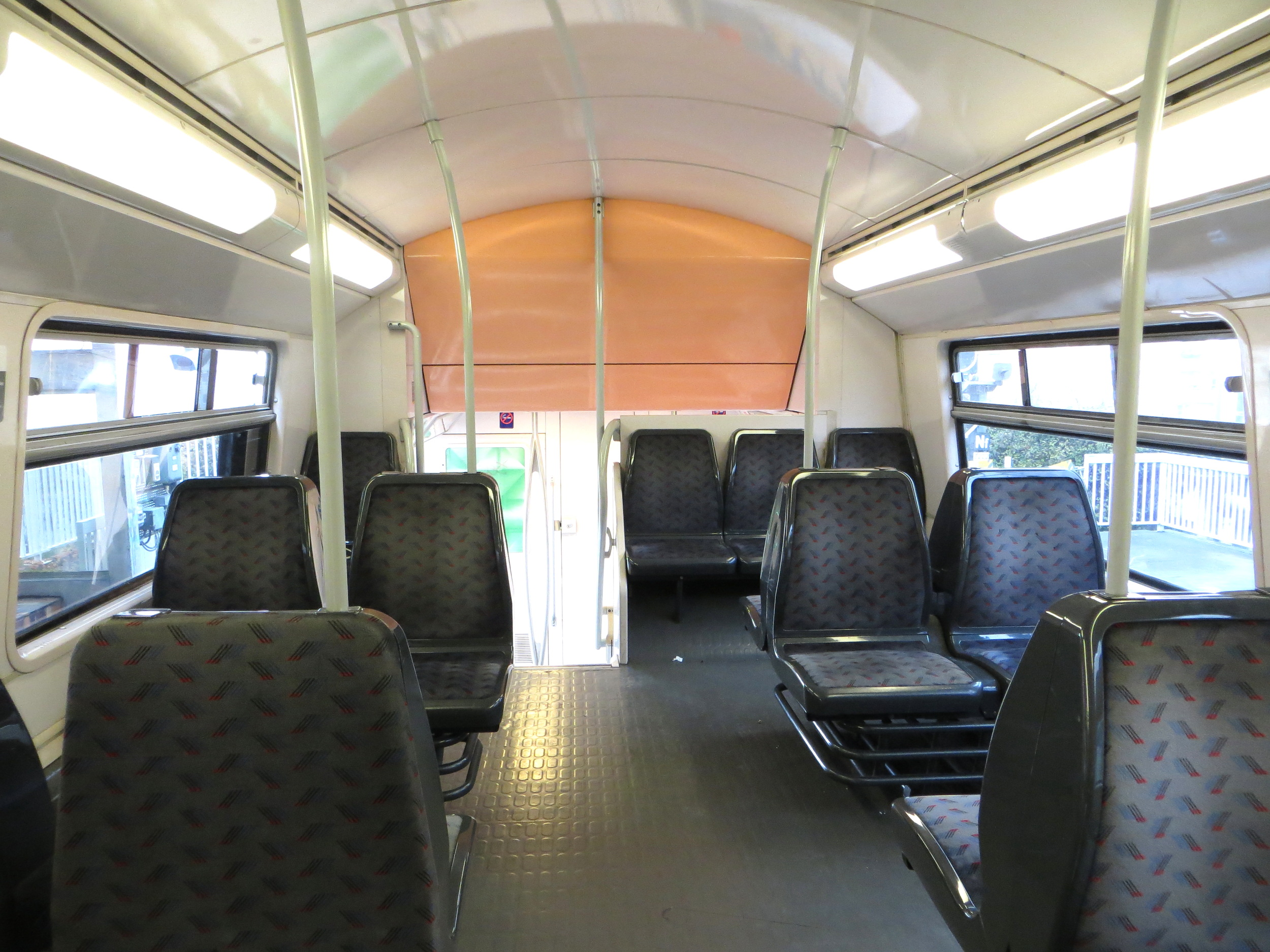
- MI 2N "Altéo" interior, upper deck
- In service: 6 June 1997–present
- Manufacturers: GEC Alsthom and ANF
- Family name: X'Trapolis
- Constructed: 1995–2005
- Entered service: 6 June 1997
- Refurbished: 2019–2021 (expected)
- Number in service: 96 trainsets (480 cars)
- Formation: 5 cars per trainset (R+M+M+M+R)
- Fleet numbers: Z 1501/2 - Z 1585/6
- Operators: RATP, SNCF
- Depots: Achères; Rueil-Malmaison; Sucy-en-Brie; Torcy
- Line served: RER RER A

Specifications
- Car length: 22 m (72 ft 2 in)
- Width: 2.9 m (9 ft 6 in)
- Height: 4.32 m (14 ft 2 in)
- Doors: 3 pairs per side

The MI 2N (French: Matériel d'Interconnexion à 2 Niveaux, English: bilevel interconnecting set) is a family of double-deck, dual-voltage electric multiple unit trainsets that are operated on the Réseau Express Régional (RER), a hybrid suburban commuter and rapid transit system serving Paris and its Île-de-France suburbs.

There are two variants of the MI 2N that look very similar but feature different motorization and interior layout:

- The MI 2N "Altéo" is operated by RATP on the RER A line. 43 trains or 215 cars were built.
- The Class Z 22500 (MI 2N "Eole") is operated by SNCF on the RER E line. 53 trains or 265 cars were built.

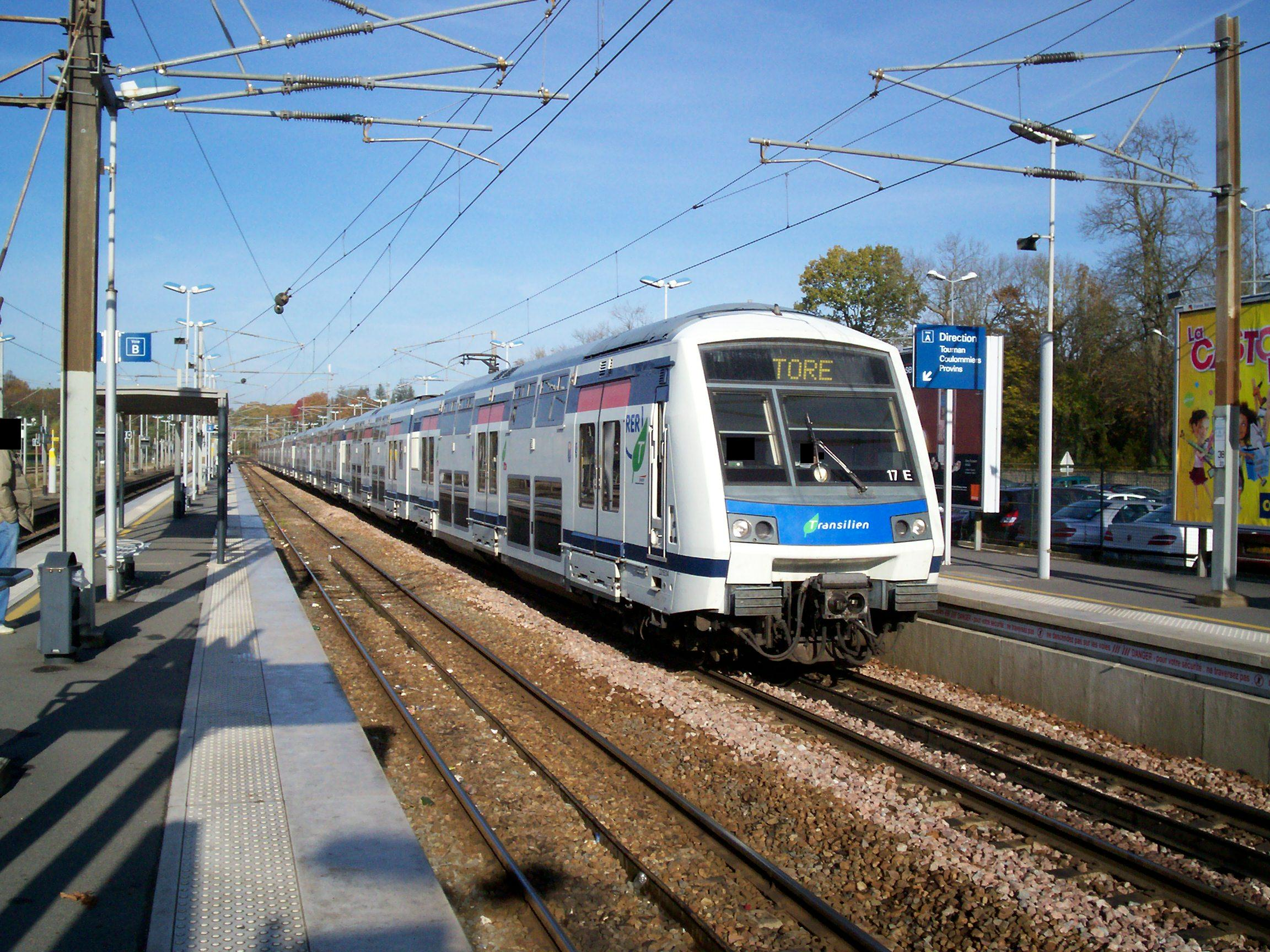
SNCF Class Z 22500 (MI 2N "Eole") at Gretz-Armainvilliers station on the RER E line. It displays the TORE mission code indicating that its destination is Tournan

The trainsets were by a consortium of French manufacturer Alstom (at the time known as GEC Alstom) and Canadian conglomerate Bombardier. The final assembly of the trains was performed at Alstom's Valenciennes factory and Bombardier's Crespin factory between 1995 and 2005.

The double-decker trains grew out of an effort to increase capacity on the RER A line, one of the world's busiest routes. These trains could carry up to 2,600 people per train, compared to 1,887 people on the single-deck trains that had been used on the RER A since it opened. These double-deck trains proved so successful and popular, operators of the RER A went on to purchase 140 MI 09 trainsets, an improved version of the MI 2N that would be built by the same Alstom-Bombardier consortium.

Having this capacity to transport more than 2600 passengers, which can be distinguished from the layout of the MI 2N trains, is the fact that they have 15 doors on each side, including 3 per car. Having a width of 2m which allows to take out and input 4 people on such door namely the unit of the flow rate of users (voy.m3). What is worth a train in single unit a flow of 60 people and train in multiple unit of 120 people.
