= Z 23000 =

Class of French electric railcars

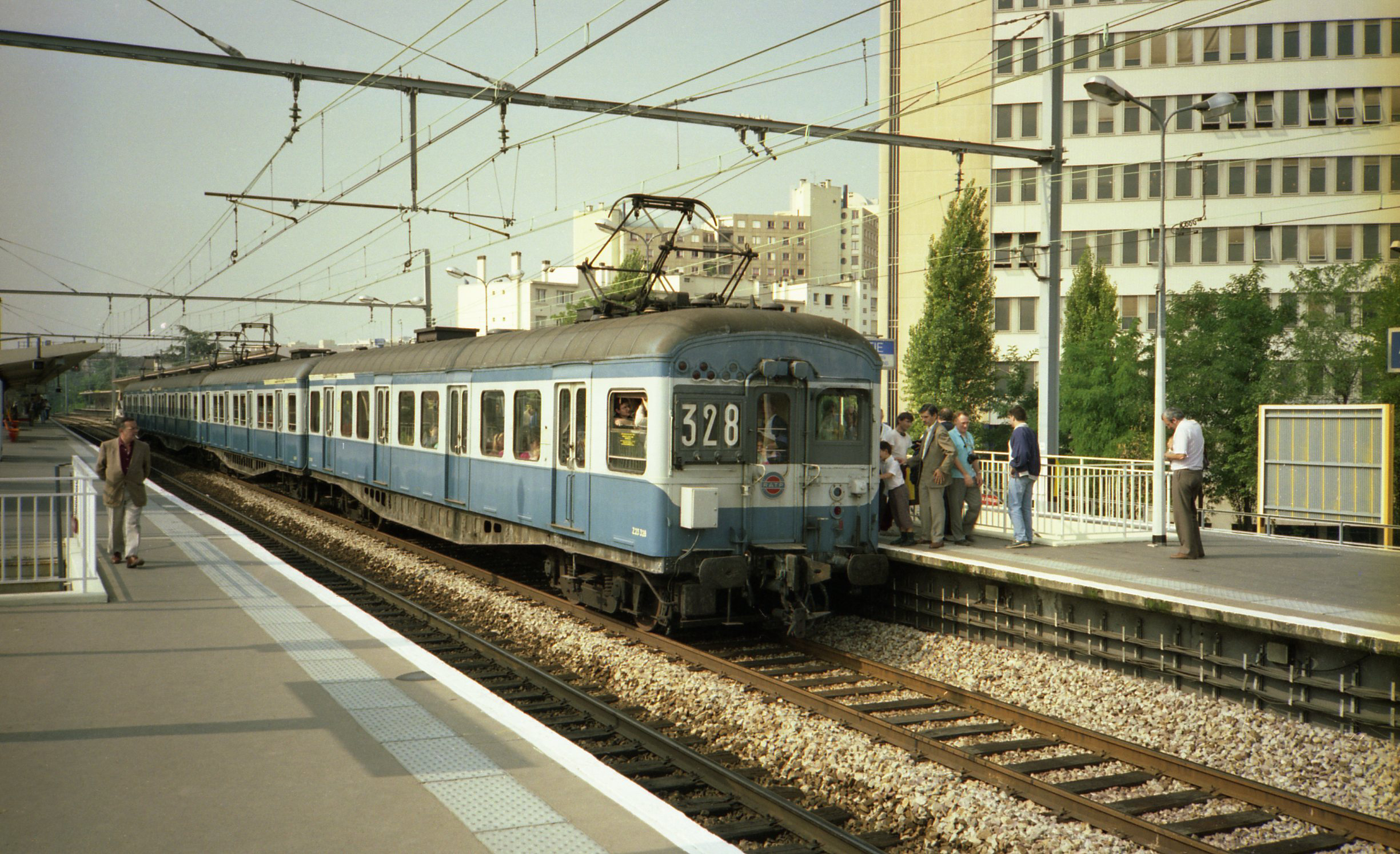
- Z 23000 train at Laplace station, c. 1980

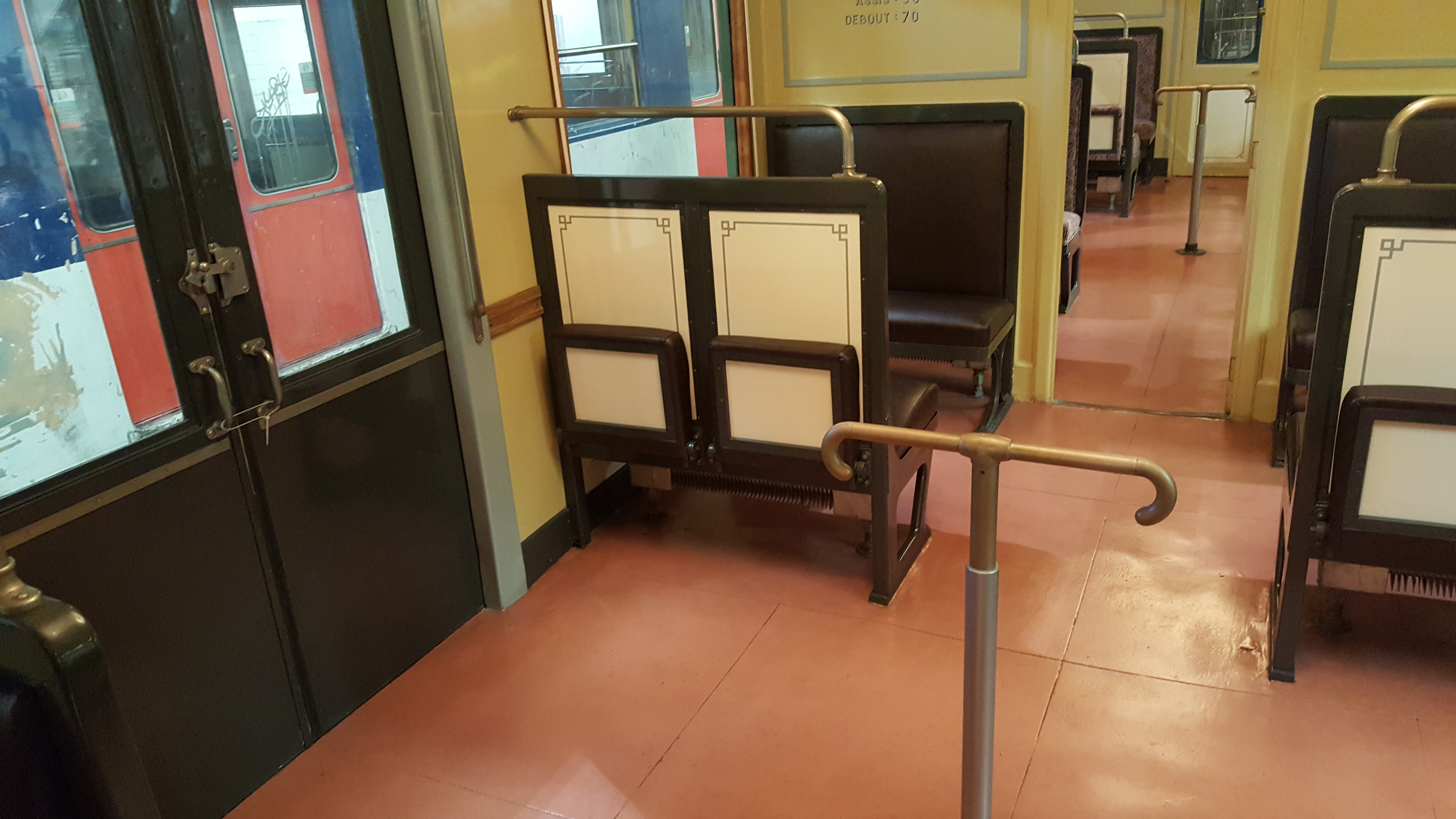
- Second-class section of preserved Z 23000 train
- In service: 1937–1987
- Manufacturers: Brissonneau et Lotz; CFMCF; CGC; CIMT; Decauville
- Constructed: 1934–1962
- Number built: 150
- Number preserved: 6
- Number scrapped: 144
- Capacity: 84 seats (56 fixed, 28 folding), 177 maximum
- Operators: CMP (before 1949); RATP (after 1949)
- Line served: Ligne de Sceaux

Specifications
- Car length: 20.7 m (67 ft 11 in)
- Width: 3.2 m (10 ft 6 in)
- Height: 4.4 m (14 ft 5 in)
- Floor height: 1.2 m (3 ft 11 in)
- Doors: 4 pairs per side, per car
- Wheel diameter: 1.1 m (3 ft 7 in)
- Maximum speed: 80 km/h (50 mph)
- Weight: 44,600 kg (98,300 lb)
- Traction motors: 2x 173.5 kW (232.7 hp) Jeumont TC127-4 self-ventilated motors
- Power output: 1,390 kW (1,860 hp) (four-car train)
- Acceleration: 1 m/s^{2} (2.2 mph/s)
- Electric systems: Overhead line, 1,500 V DC
- Current collection: Pantograph
- Track gauge: 1,435 mm (4 ft 8 1/2 in) standard gauge

The Z 23000 was a type of passenger train used by the Compagnie du Chemin de Fer Métropolitain de Paris (CMP).

Better known during its 50 years of service as the "Z railcar" ("automotrice Z"), it was introduced in 1937 to serve the Sceaux Line in the southern suburbs of Paris, which had been modernized and electrified by 1937. The Z 23000 cars were built with identical motors, and were the first generation of modern self-propelled locomotive technology engineered for a future regional metro network, which would not be created until forty years later as the Réseau Express Régional (RER).

== History ==
In 1930, the CMP ordered the Z 23000, intended to be suitable for reliable and efficient suburban service on the Sceaux Line, which was being radically modernized and electrified at the time of the order. These new railcars introduced several new features, including four pairs of doors per side (similar to equipment used on the Paris Métro), allowing for faster passenger boarding at stations, support for high boarding platforms, longer cars without significant gaps at curved platforms, light construction for faster acceleration, and simple, reliable electrical equipment. The railcars were equipped with a pantograph for capturing 1.5 kV DC power from overhead catenary lines.

The Z 23000 railcars were ordered in several phases; the first was in 1934, built by Forges et Ateliers de Construction Electriques de Jeumont (FACEJ), followed by a second order in 1937, a third in 1942, and a fourth in June 1950. Similarly, commercial implementation of the railcars was also rolled out in multiple phases between November 1937 and December 1938 (for the first two series) on the electrified Sceaux Line. Two final orders were placed in 1959 for 21 cars, and in 1961 for a further 25. A total of 148 railcars were built over a period of almost 30 years.

The Z 23000 also played a part in the integration of the Sceaux and the RER B Lines in 1977, initially extending to the Châtelet–Les Halles station. The cars received some technical improvements to accommodate steeper grades on the new RER B tracks. The line has a north–south ramp with a gradient of 40 per thousand. RATP engineers tested the railcars on the Line A ramp between Le Vésinet and Saint-Germain-en-Laye. The brakes proved inadequate, and some of the cars' spoked wheels were upgraded to monoblock designs. However, the Z 23000, designed for a continuous 1500 V current, had limited functionality on the RER B, as the line was electrified using SNCF's 25 kV AC system north of Gare du Nord (with which the Z 23000 was incompatible). Because of this, the RATP ordered MI 79, or Z 8100, trainsets for the RER B, which could use both electric systems.

=== Withdrawal ===
The RATP planned to withdraw the Z 23000 from service by 1983, but technical issues with the MS 61 (which would soon operate exclusively on the RER A) forced them to allocate 24 then-new MI 79 cars from the RER B to make up for the shortfall. Withdrawal of the Z 23000 began in 1984, but was slowed down by a cold wave in 1985 and 1986: the cold wave caused technical issues with the MI 79 rolling stock, forcing surviving Z 23000 units to make up for the shortfall. The withdrawal of the Z 23000 was necessary to free up the terminus tracks at Gare du Nord for the opening of the first section of the RER D on 27 September 1987, as well as the opening of the Saint-Michel–Notre-Dame platforms the following year. Although the Z 23000 was upgraded to climb a 4.08% gradient from Luxembourg to Châtelet, its momentum would have been lost if it stopped at Saint-Michel.

The last Z 23000 train ran from Gare du Nord to Orsay-Ville on 27 February 1987, fifty years after the railcars were introduced on the Sceaux Line. After the Z 23000's official withdrawal from service, two runs took place on the southern part of the line in 1990 and 1994.

== Order list ==
Order	Number purchased	Numbering	Original owner	Ordered	Builder	Delivered	Notes
1	21	Z 23221-241	CMP	1934	Decauville	1937	Delivered in "duck blue" livery
1	24	Z 23242-265	CMP	1934	CFMCF	1937	Delivered in "duck blue" livery
1	12	Z 23266-277	CMP	1934	CGC	1937	Delivered in "duck blue" livery
2	4	Z 23278-281	CMP	1937	CFMCF	?	Delivered in "duck blue" livery
2	14	Z 23451-464	PO	1937	CFMCF	1938	Delivered in "duck blue" livery
3	5	Z 23282-286	CMP	1942	Brissonneau and Lotz	1947	Delivered in "Celtic green" livery
3	10	Z 23287-296	CMP	1942	Brissonneau and Lotz	1949	Delivered in "Celtic green" livery
4	14	Z 23297-310	RATP	20 June 1950	CIMT	1952	Equipped with fluorescent lights instead of chandeliers
5	21	Z 23311-331	RATP	2 October 1959	CIMT	1961	
6	25	Z 23332-356	RATP	1961	CIMT	1962	

== Preserved examples ==
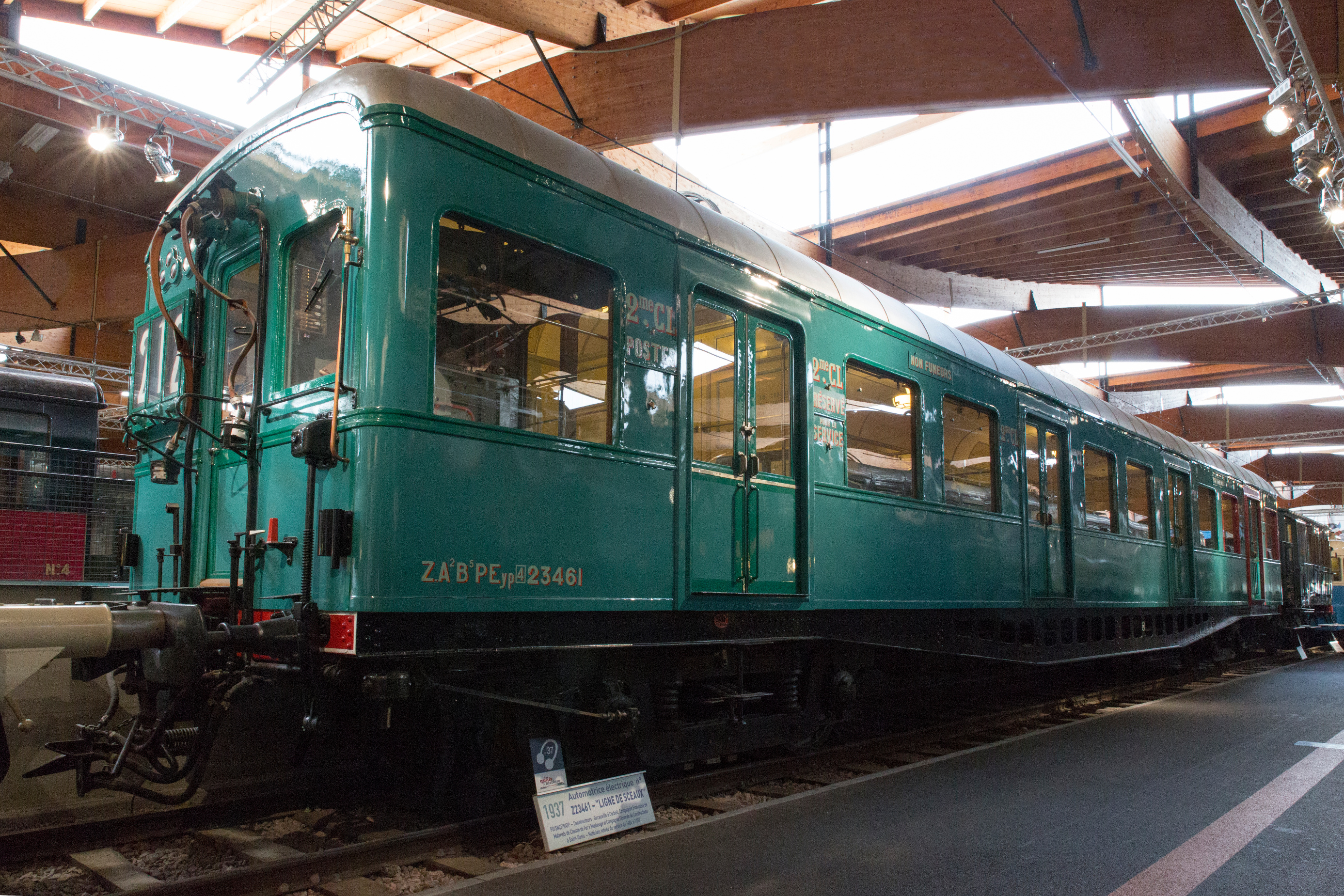
Z 23461 preserved at Cité du Train in Mulhouse in the original "duck blue" livery.

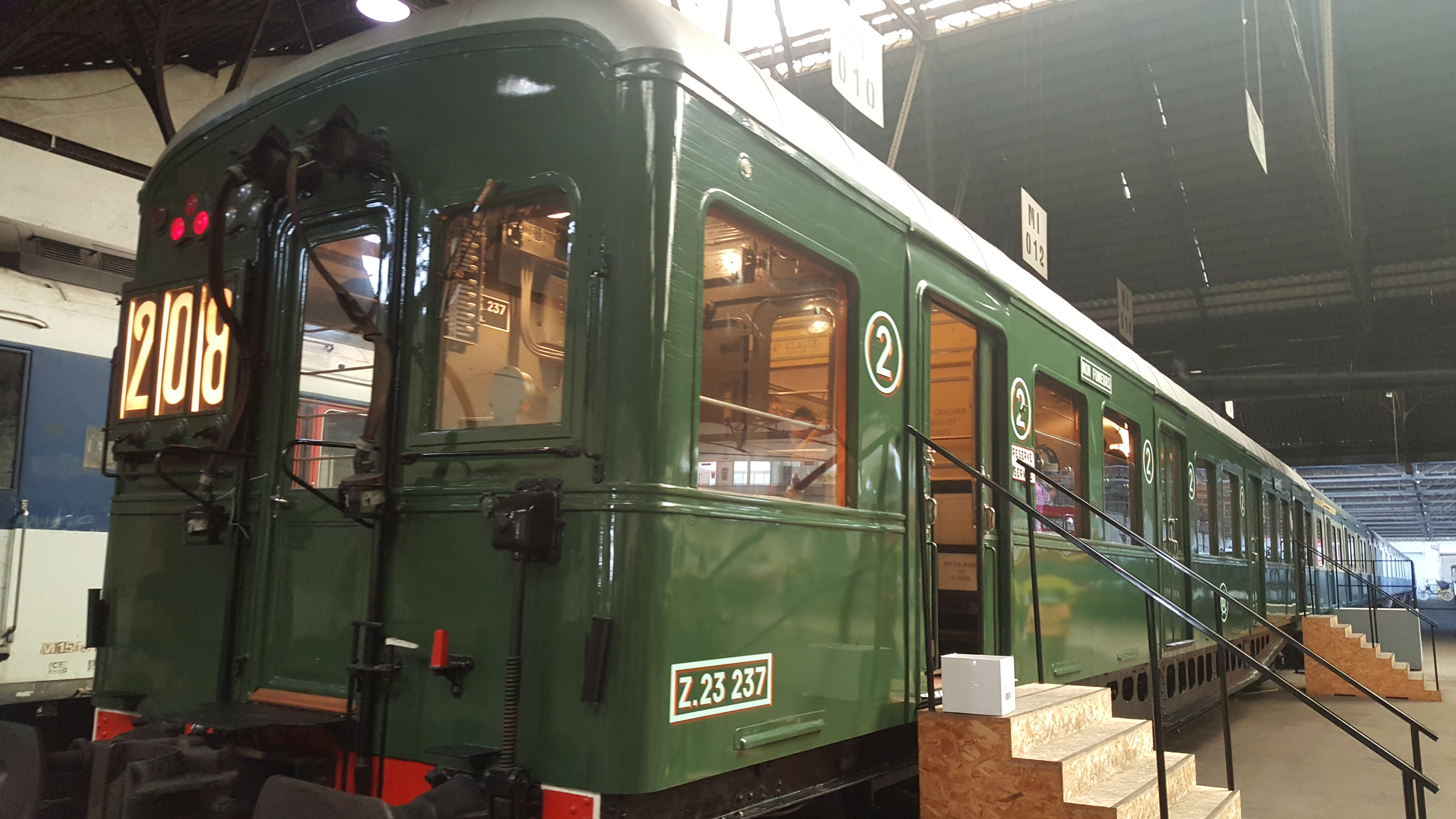
Z 23237 preserved at Villeneuve-Saint-Georges in the later "Celtic green" livery.

Z car number 23461 is preserved in its original "duck blue" livery at the Cité du Train museum in Mulhouse.

The RATP preserves five railcars in the Villeneuve-Saint-Georges reserve. Z 23237 was restored in the "Celtic green" livery, while Z 23342, Z 23312, Z 23326 and Z 23328 were preserved in the same blue and grey livery they had when they were retired.

== Gallery ==
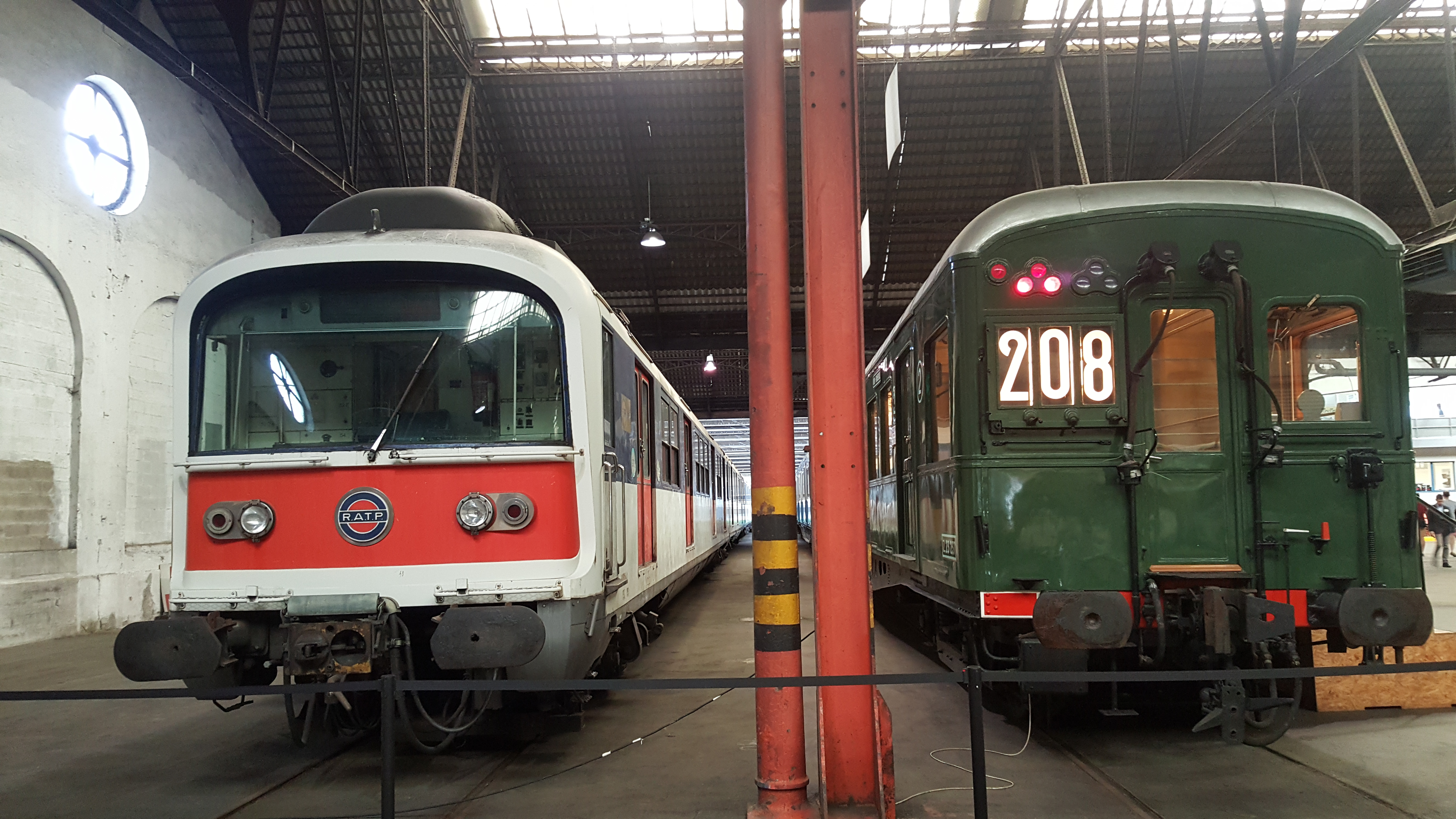
MS 61 (left) and Z 23237 (right) preserved at Villeneuve-Saint-Georges

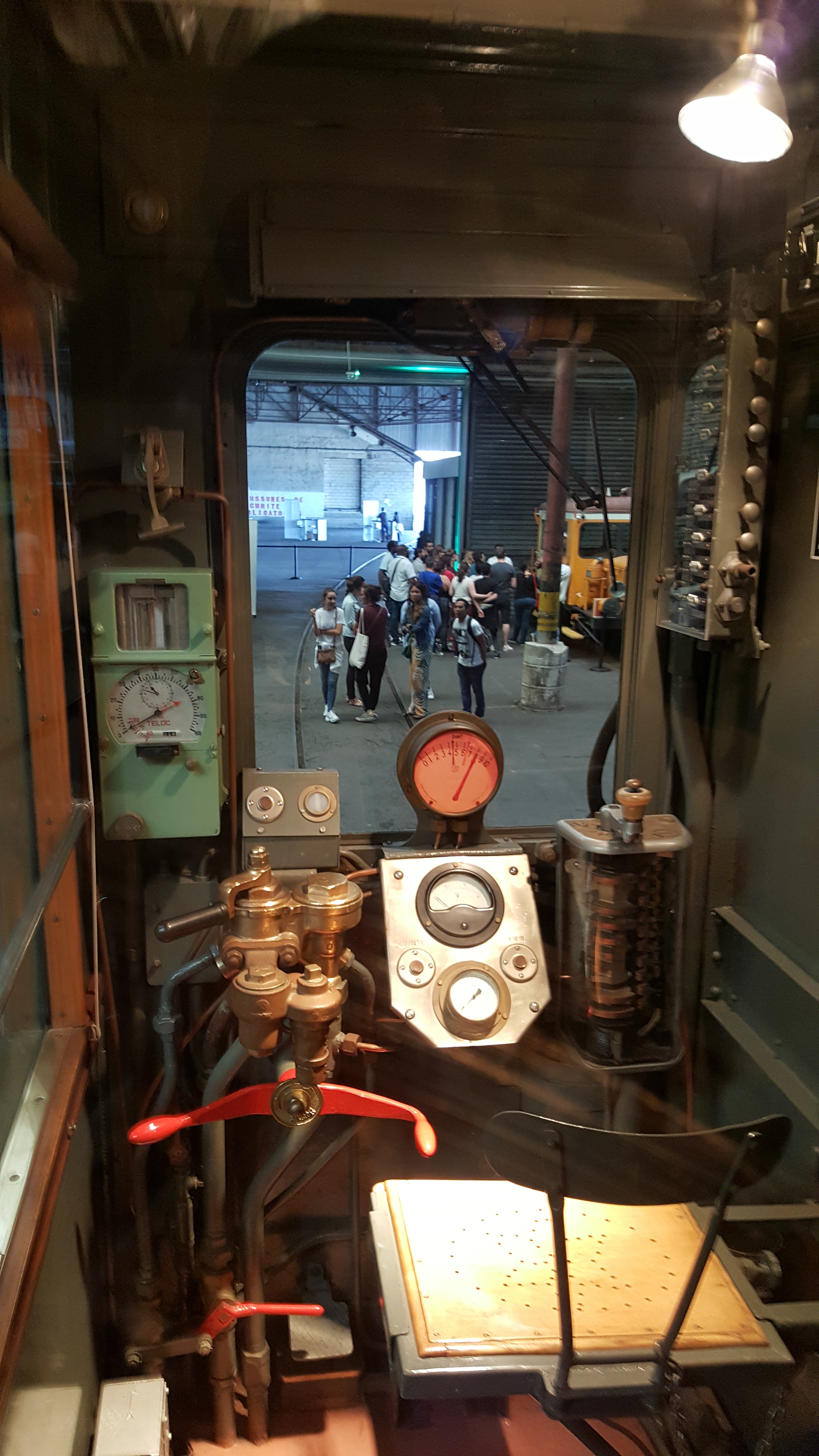
Control cab

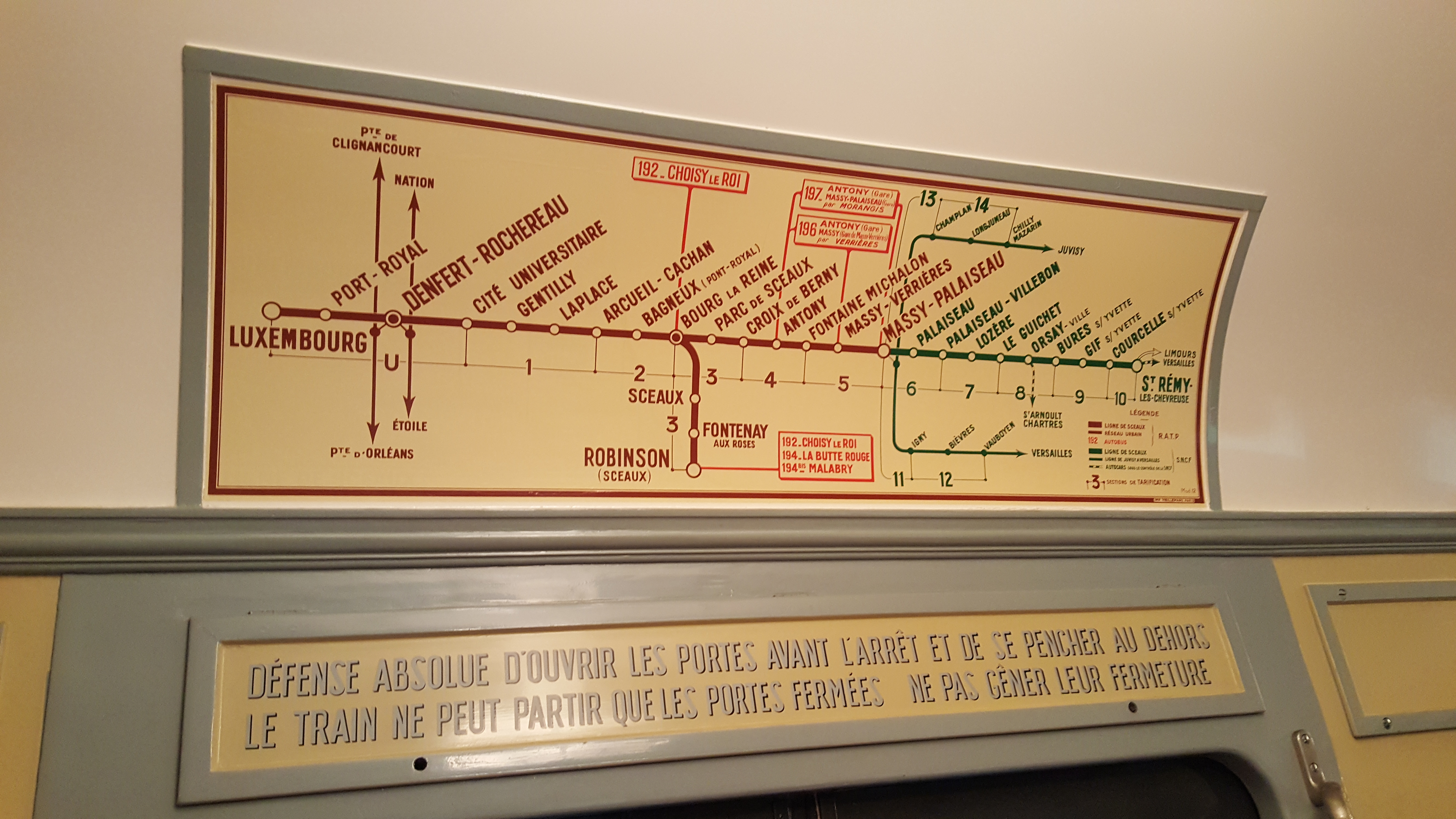
Route map

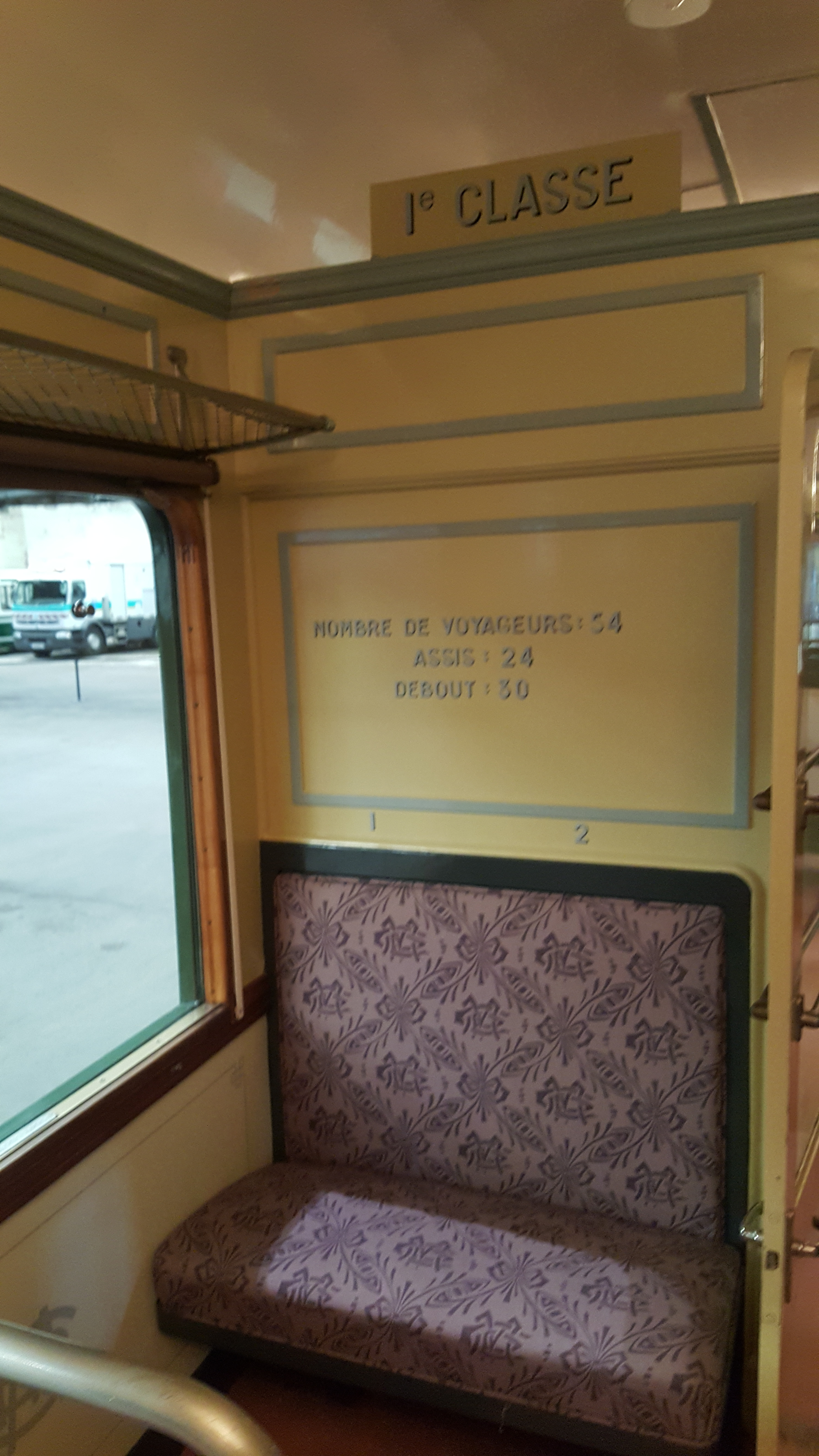
First class seat

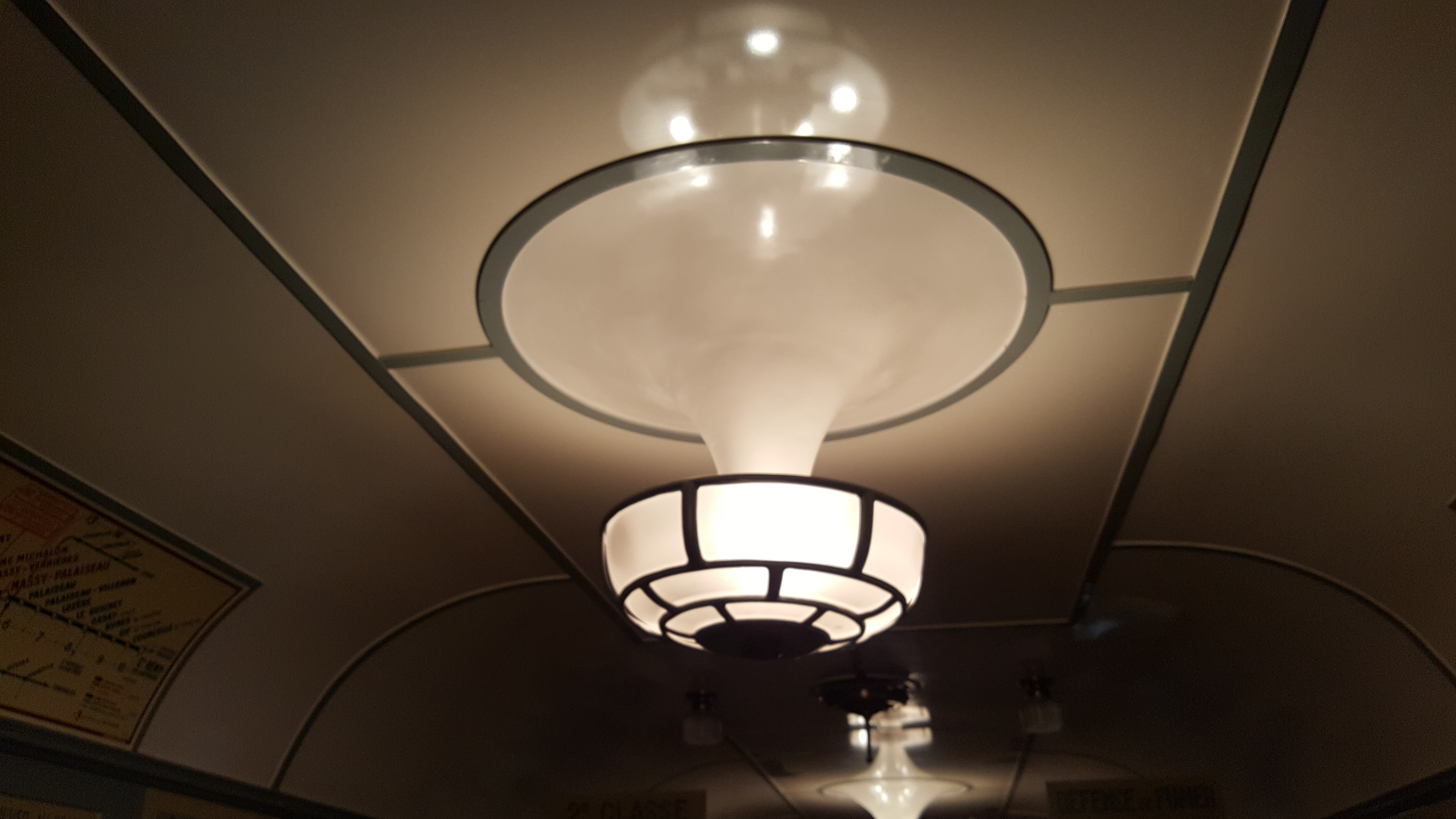
Chandelier
