= MS 61 =

French electric multiple unit trainset

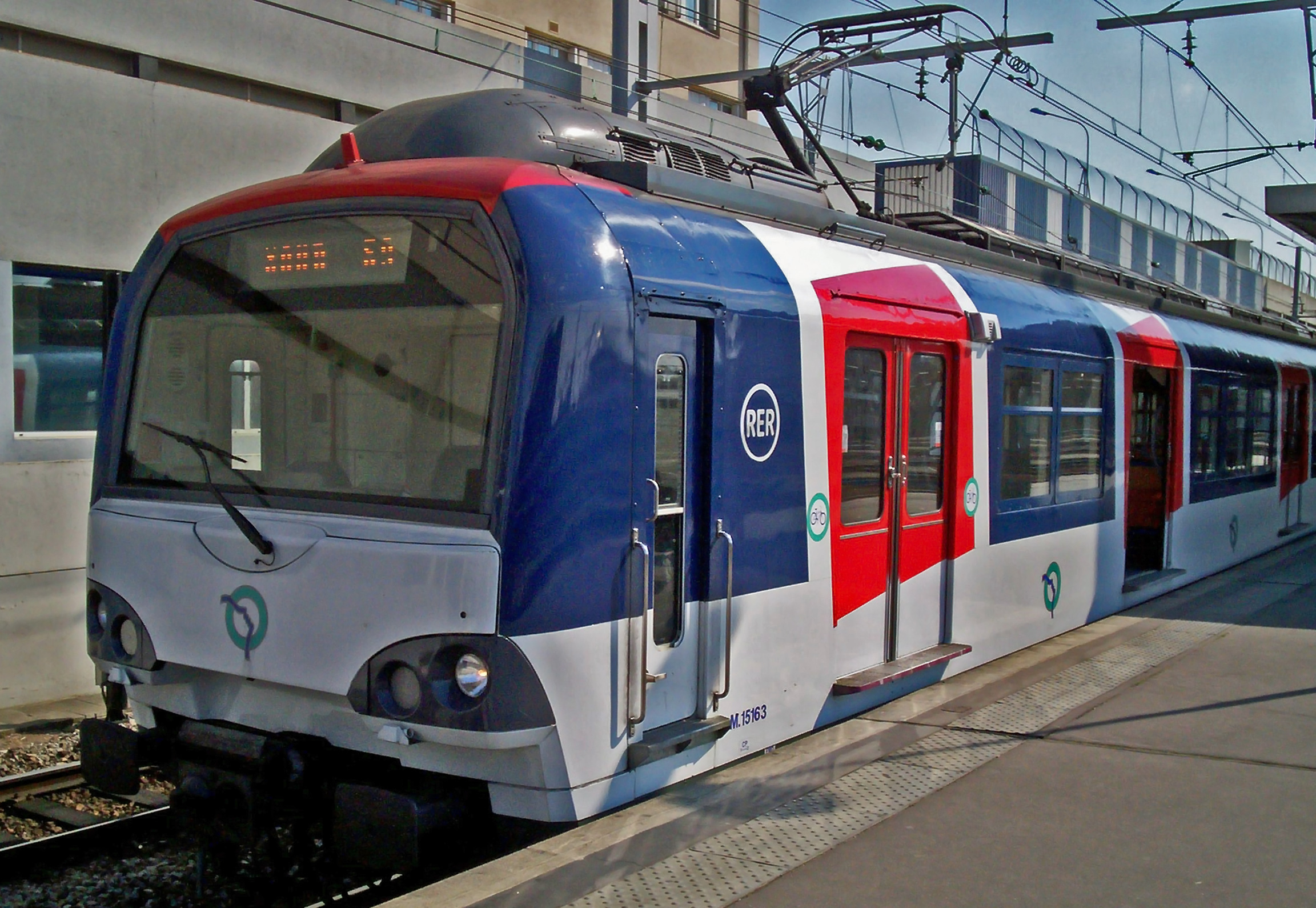
- Refurbished MS 61 train

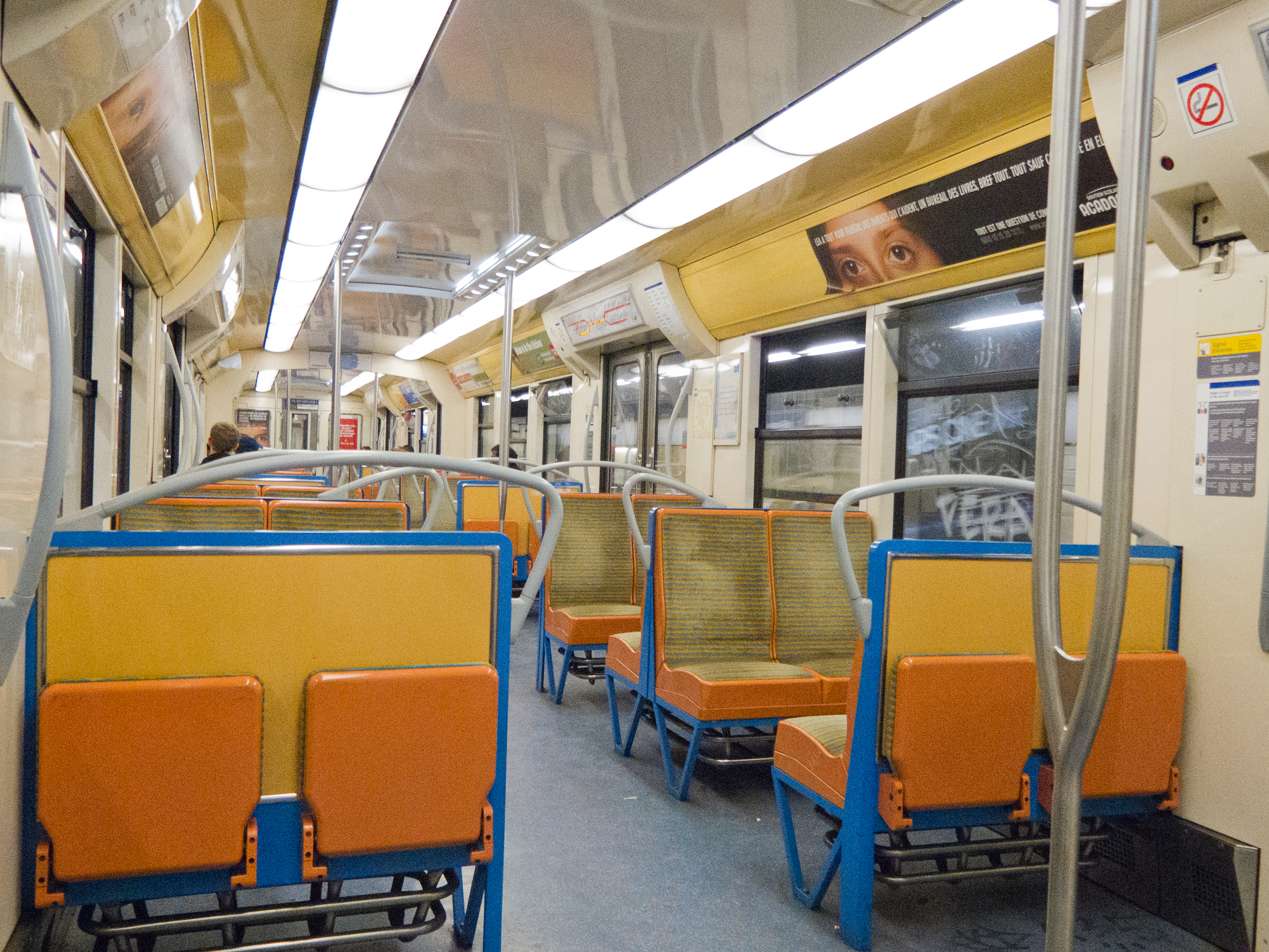
- Interior
- In service: 29 June 1967 – 16 April 2016
- Manufacturers: ANF, Brissonneau et Lotz and CIMT
- Constructed: 1966–1967 for first train
- Refurbished: 1985–1992; 2005–2008 (partial rebuild)
- Scrapped: 2016
- Number built: 127 units + 1 trailer
- Number preserved: 1 unit (2010)
- Formation: 3 cars per trainset
- Capacity: 292 seats per unit (200 fixed and 92 flip-up)
- Operator: RATP
- Depots: Sucy-en-Brie; Rueil-Malmaison; Torcy
- Lines served: (1969–2016) (1967–1983)

Specifications
- Train length: 73.22 m (240 ft 3 in)
- Car length: Motor: 24.555 m (80 ft 6.7 in); Trailer: 24.110 m (79 ft 1.2 in)
- Width: 2.91 m (9 ft 7 in)
- Height: 4.28 m (14 ft 1 in)
- Floor height: 1.24 m (4 ft 1 in)
- Doors: 4 pairs per side, per car
- Wheel diameter: 1.05 m (3 ft 5 in)
- Wheelbase: Motor: 2.6 m (8 ft 6 in); Trailer: 2.2 m (7 ft 3 in)
- Maximum speed: 100 km/h (62 mph)
- Weight: 148 tonnes
- Traction system: Cam switch JH (Jeumont Heidmann)
- Traction motors: 8x Oerlikon HMW 48 motors
- Power output: 1,600 kW (2,100 hp)
- Acceleration: 2.8 km/(h⋅s) (1.7 mph/s)
- Deceleration: 5.0 km/(h⋅s) (3.1 mph/s) (emergency brake)
- Electric systems: Overhead line, 1,500 V DC
- Current collection: Pantograph type AM 44
- Bogies: twin engine, welded frame, spring suspension
- Braking systems: Disc and dynamic(rheostatic)
- Safety system: SACEM
- Coupling system: Scharfenberg type
- Multiple working: MS61 (3 trainsets in operation)
- Headlight type: Head: Halogen; Tail: LED
- Track gauge: 1,435 mm (4 ft 8 1/2 in) standard gauge

Notes/references
- Source: RATP (1996). This infobox shows the latest status before this train was withdrawn.

The MS 61 (French: Matériel Suburbain de 1961, English: Suburban rolling stock of 1961) was an electric multiple unit trainset that was operated on line A and line B of the Réseau Express Régional (RER), a hybrid suburban commuter and rapid transit system serving Paris and its Île-de-France suburbs.

The MS 61 borrowed many elements from the Z 23000 railcars built for the Ligne de Sceaux (a predecessor of the RER B), including four pairs of doors on each side of the cars for fast boarding of passengers at stations, but the MS 61 was capable of speeds of up to 100 km/h (62 mph) compared to 80 km/h (50 mph) for the Z 23000.

Unlike later rolling stock for the RER lines, the MS 61 lacked dual-voltage capabilities and could only use the RATP's 1.5 kV DC electrical system, limiting them to only operating between Saint-Germain-en-Laye and Boissy-Saint-Léger or Marne-la-Vallée–Chessy on the RER A and between Gare du Nord and Robinson or Saint-Rémy-lès-Chevreuse on the RER B.

The MS 61 trains first started service on 29 June 1967 on the RER B and were removed from the line on 28 February 1983 after the delivery of the MI 79 and MI 84 dual-voltage trainsets. The MS 61 trains began operation on the RER A on 14 December 1969 where they remained in service until 16 April 2016 after gradually being replaced by the MI 2N and MI 09 series of dual-voltage, higher capacity (double-decker) trains.

== History ==
=== Construction ===
The MS 61 series was built before the RER came into existence on 8 December 1977: a total of 127 units and one spare trailer were built by Brissonneau et Lotz, ANF and CIMT for the RATP from 1963.

The manufacturers constructed a total of six types for the MS 61 series: A, B, C, D, E and Ex. Types A and B had a windshield with three-sections of glass, while types C, D, E and Ex had a windshield with a single curved piece of glass (similar in appearance to the MF 67 for the Paris Metro).

=== Service history ===
The first MS 61 trains (type A units) entered service on the Ligne de Sceaux (now the southern part of RER B) from 29 June 1967. On 14 December 1969, type B units replaced trains pulled by SNCF class 141TB steam locomotives on the Ligne de Vincennes (now part of RER A), following the completion of electrification work and the relocation of the western terminus from Gare de la Bastille to Nation.

Type C units entered service when the western end of the RER A between La Défense and Charles de Gaulle–Étoile opened on 19 January 1970, and reached Auber on 23 November 1971: type D units then reinforced the former when that line extended to Saint-Germain-en-Laye on 1 October 1972, displacing the SNCF Class Z 1400 trains. From 8 December 1977, the connection of RER A and B at Châtelet–Les Halles, and the extension of RER A to Noisy-le-Grand – Mont d'Est allowed all MS 61 units, including the Type E and Ex units, to move between and operate on the two lines.

MS 61 trains reached Torcy (on RER A) on 19 December 1980 and Gare du Nord (RER B) on 10 December 1981, but the next northern RER B extensions to Charles de Gaulle Airport and Mitry–Claye (completed 7 June 1983) would use SNCF's 25 kV AC electrification, instead of RATP's 1.5 kV DC system that the MS 61 could only handle. Consequently, the MI 79 and MI 84 units, both of which were designed to work with the two electrification systems, replaced the MS 61 units on RER B by 28 February 1983, but the track connections north of Châtelet–Les Halles allowed empty MS 61 trains to continue accessing the southern part of RER B.

For the remainder of their service life, MS 61 trains operated on the RATP-owned sections of the RER A, which (from 1 April 1992) was from Saint-Germain-en-Laye to Boissy-Saint-Léger and (occasionally) Marne-la-Vallée–Chessy.

MS 61 trains were never the oldest in service on the RER: the Z 23000 trains (from 1937) remained in service on the Ligne de Sceaux until 27 February 1987, while the Z 5300 trains (from 1965) joined the RER fleet on 26 September 1979. The last Z 5300 trains operated on the RER D between Juvisy and Melun until 8 December 2018, when they were replaced by 19 Regio 2N (Z 57000) trains.

=== Refurbishment ===
There were two refurbishment programmes for the MS 61 trains: the first one took place between 1985 and 1992, and the other rebuilt 105 units between 2005 and 2008. In the second refurbishment, the front ends were replaced with a new design. The first train from the second refurbishment entered service on 26 April 2006.

=== Withdrawal ===
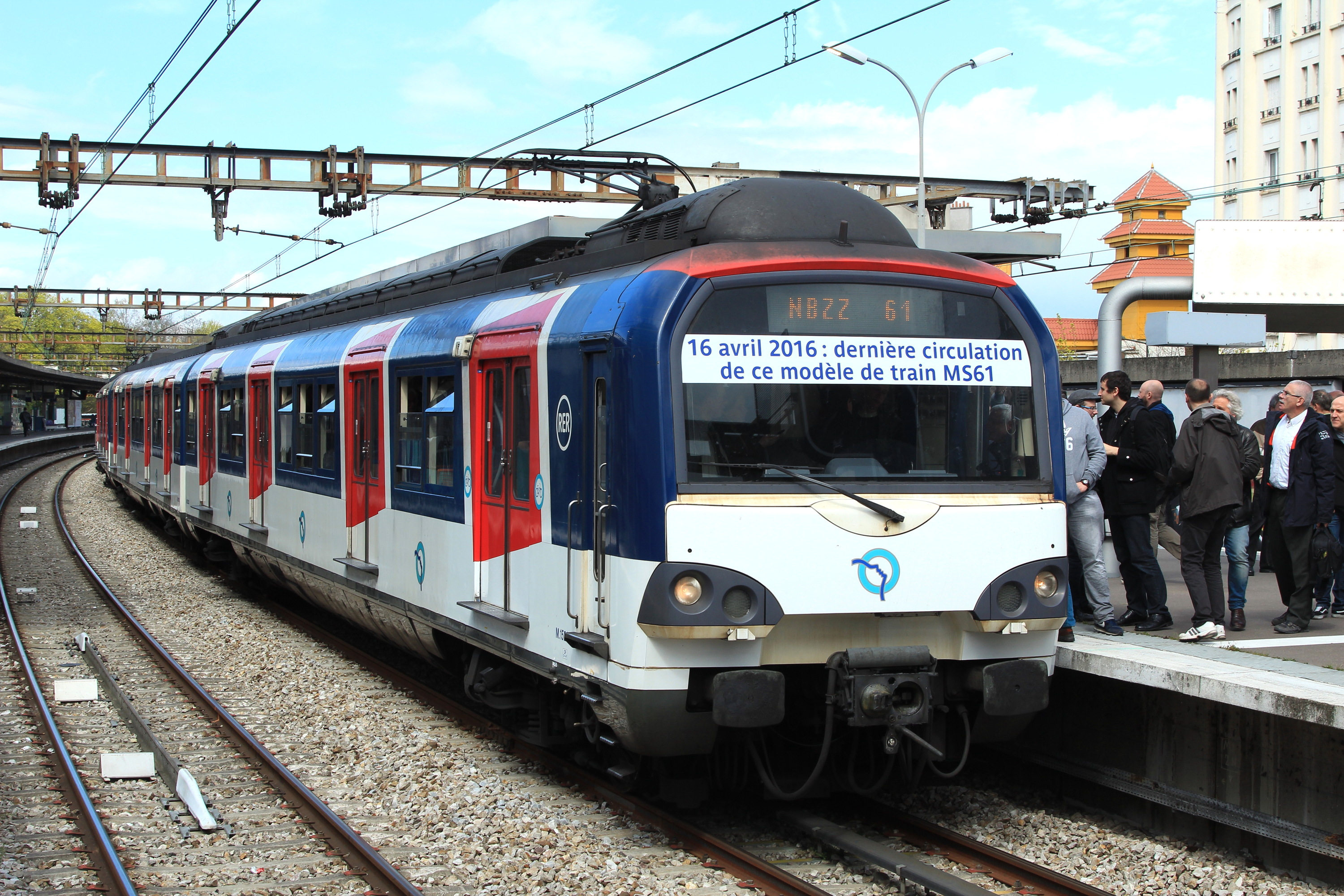
The last operational MS 61 train at Joinville le Pont, on 16 April 2016. It displays the NBZZ mission code indicating that its destination is Boissy-Saint-Léger

The MI 09 double-decker trains, which entered service on 5 December 2011, replaced all MS 61 and MI 84 trains on RER A, as part of a works programme to increase passenger capacity and replace life-expired infrastructure. Once all MS 61 and MI 84 trains were withdrawn from service, all trains on the RER A were double-decker (MI 2N "Altéo" and MI 09).

In 2014, the RATP appointed Veolia Environment to dismantle and recycle the MS 61 units that were part of the second refurbishment programme, plus two additional cars. Veolia dismantled these trains at a specialised facility at Torvilliers, because the trains contained hazardous materials such as asbestos.

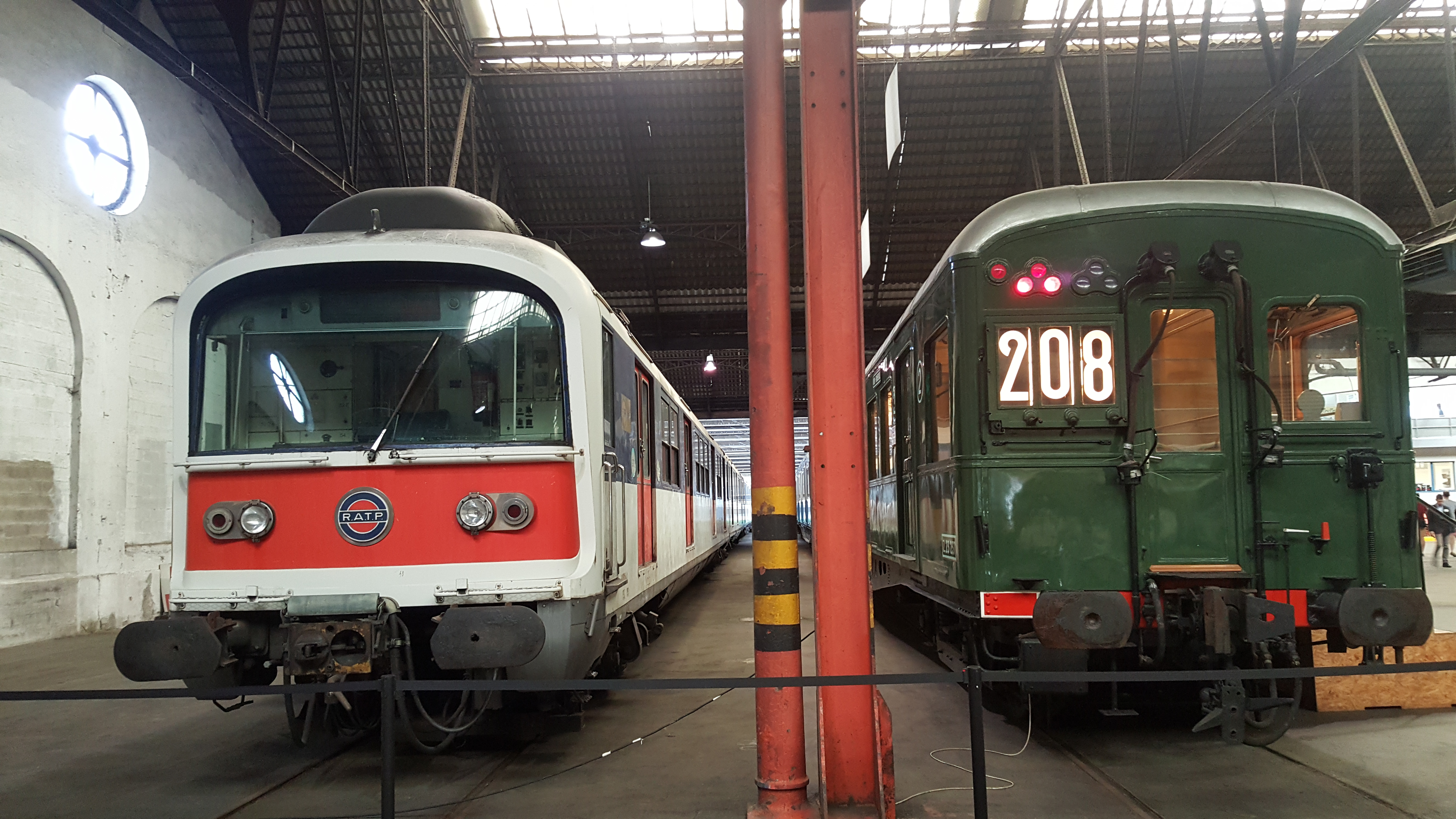
MS 61 trainset 24 (left) and a Z 23000 (right) preserved at Villeneuve-Saint-Georges

In 2010, the RATP selected trainset 24 (cars M.15050, AB.18024 and M.15151) for preservation at as part of the historic rail vehicle collection at the Villeneuve-Saint-Georges yard. The selected unit was not part of the second refurbishment programme, and retains the original front ends and the "Île-de-France" livery.

== Design and features ==
=== Seating and accessibility ===
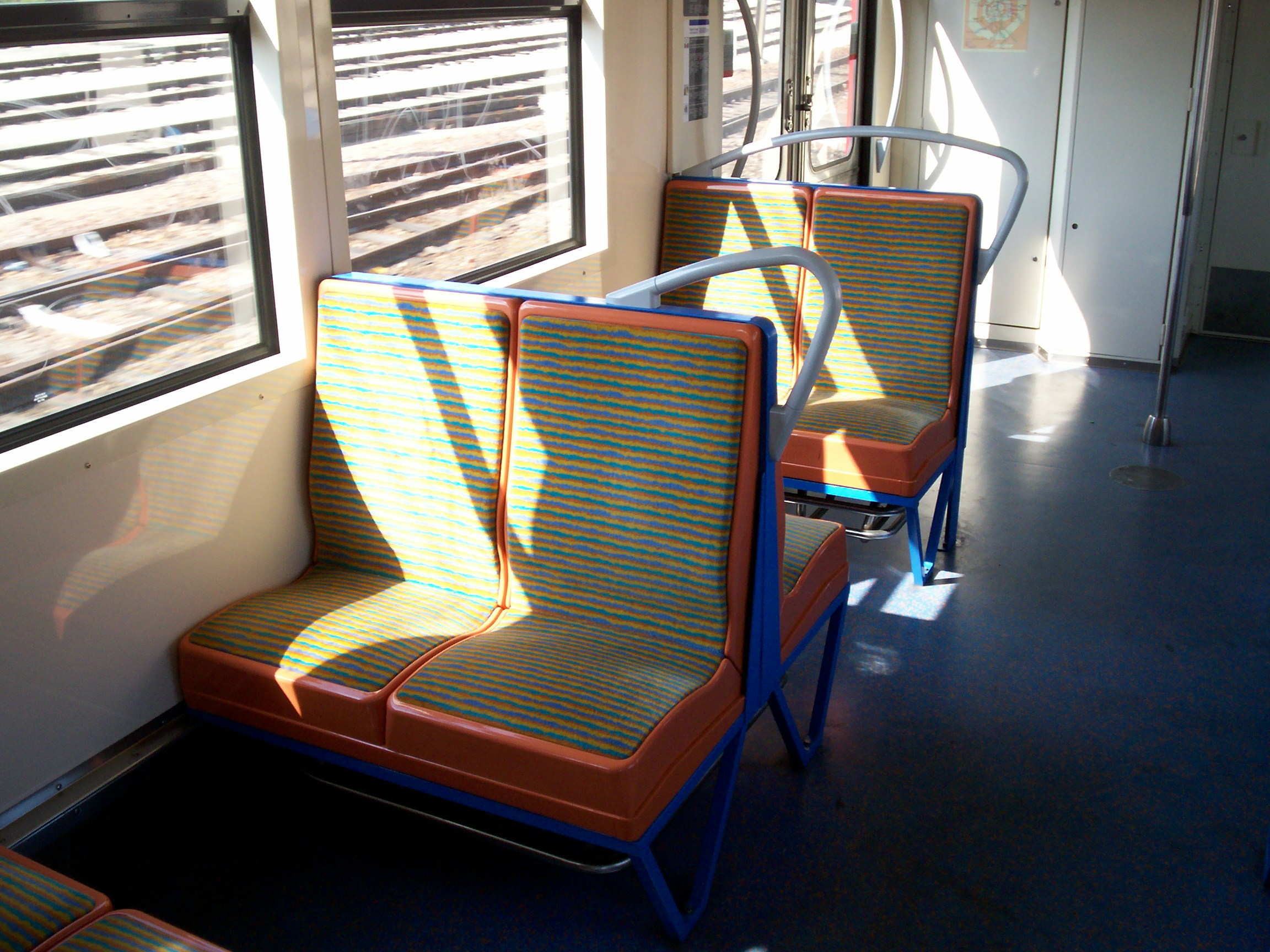
Passenger seats, after the second refurbishment

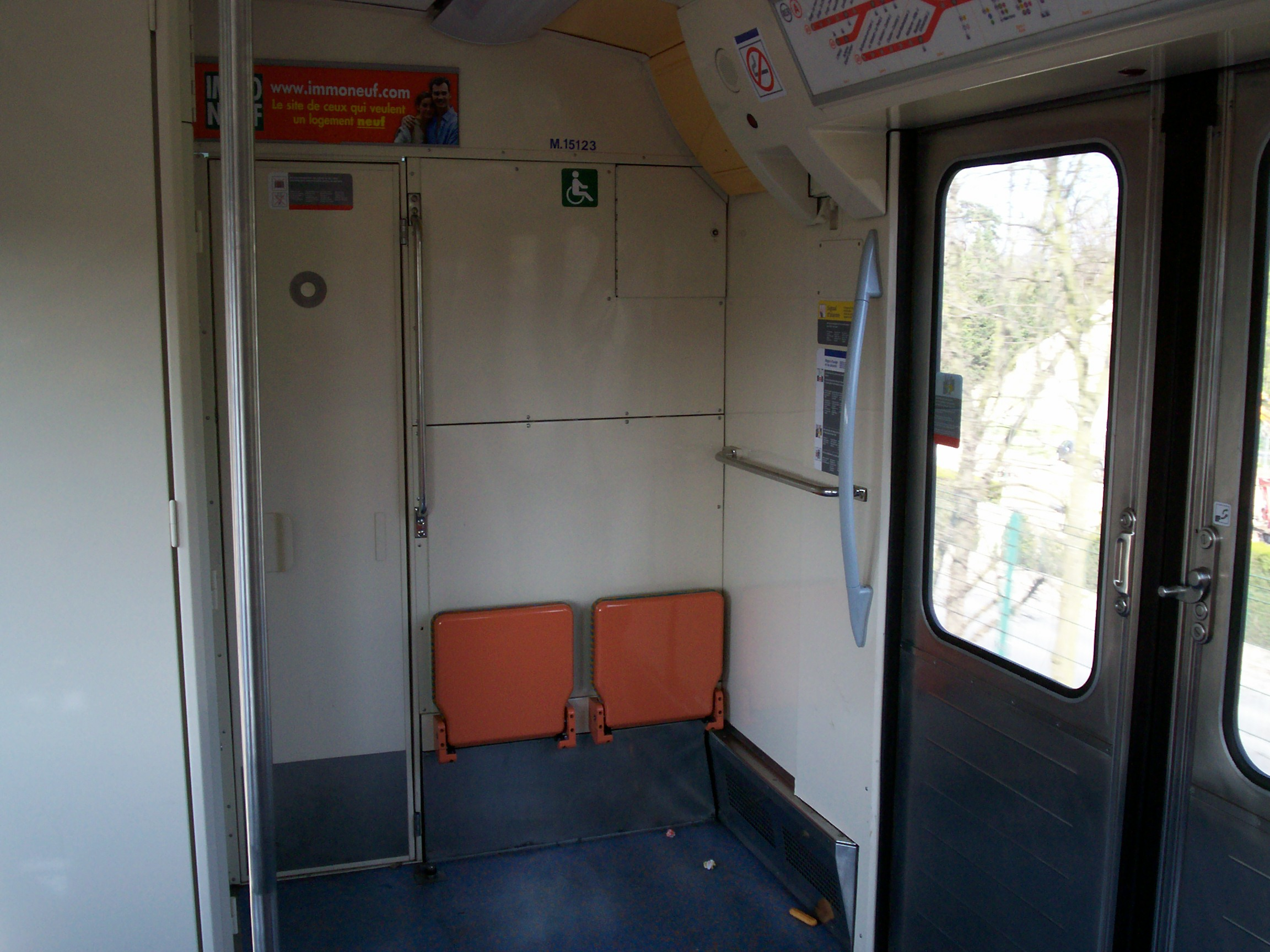
Area designated for wheelchair users

According to the RATP, one MS 61 unit was capable of carrying up to 721 passengers (292 seated and 429 standing): the trains also provided luggage racks in both first and second classes, but they were removed in the first refurbishment programme from 1985 to 1992. The trailer cars also had a first class section: the Syndicat des Transports Parisiens (STP, now Île-de-France Mobilités) abolished first class travel on 1 September 1999, and the second refurbishment programme removed the bulkheads that divided the first and second class sections, along with those that separated the leading set of doors of the driving motor.

The seats originally used leatherette covering, and were coloured green in first class, and red in second class. During the first refurbishment programme, they were replaced by a fire and vandal-resistant design that used a navy blue plastic frame and purple fabric covering. In the second refurbishment programme, the seats were replaced again, with a similar design that used an orange plastic frame and a moquette of multicoloured stripes.

The MS 61 trains were built at a time when wheelchair accessibility was not a priority. Following the second refurbishment, the leading end of motor cars were designated for users with wheelchairs, as well as passengers with bicycles. In practice however, wheelchair users would travel on the leading car because there was no level access between the platform and the train, and a staff-operated boarding ramp (located on the platforms) had to be used to allow wheelchair users to board or alight an MS 61 train.

=== Passenger information ===
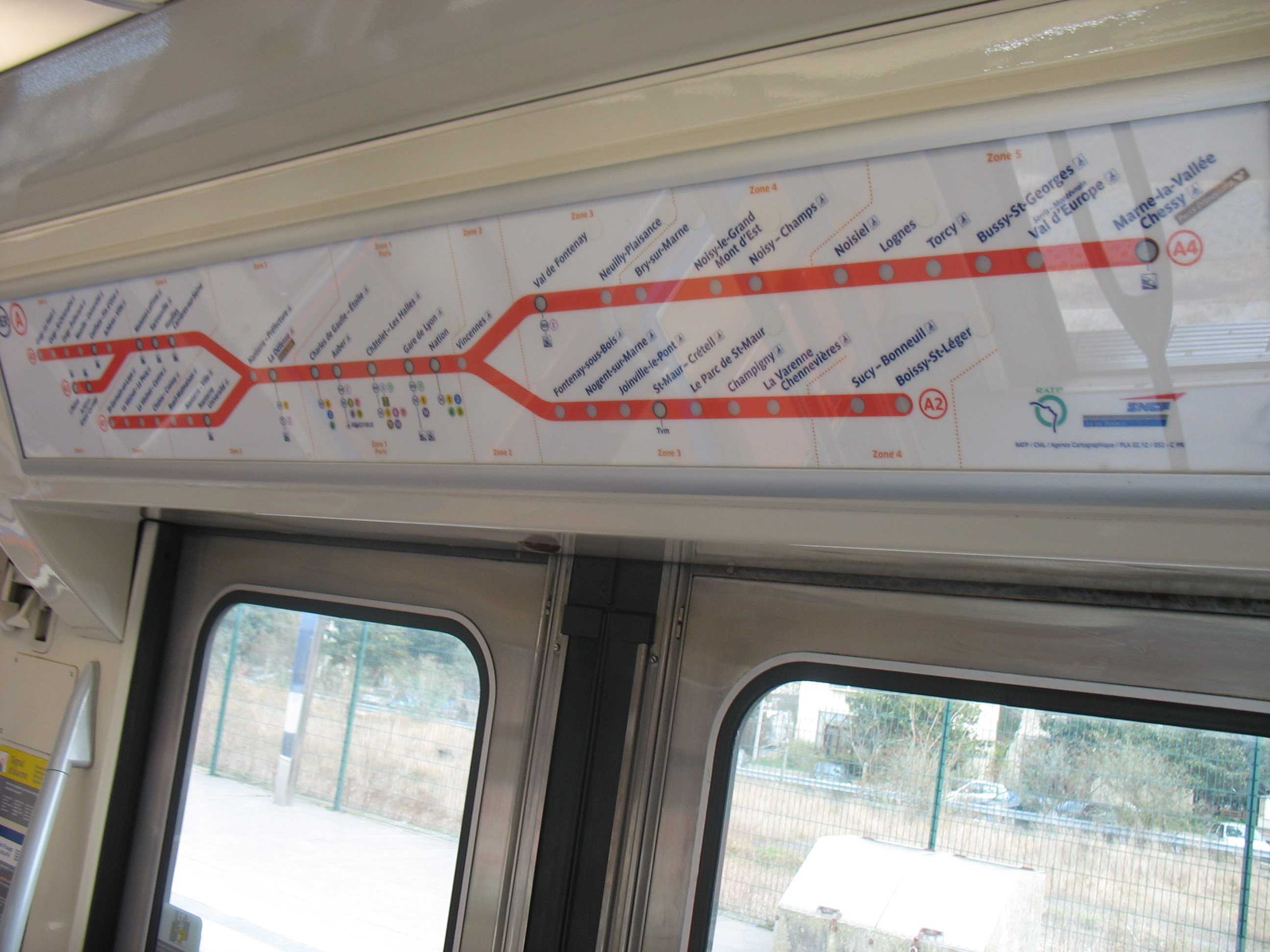
An electronic line diagram, which is part of the SISVE passenger information system

The second refurbishment programme introduced the on-board audio and visual information system (SISVE) to the MS 61: SISVE is a passenger information system that consists of automated passenger information announcements and electronic line diagrams.

=== Operation and signalling ===
Initial batches of MS 61 trains were operated by a two-person crew of a motorman and a conductor, as it had been the case for the trains that they replaced: however, they were later converted for one-person operation. The operation of passenger doors on the MS 61 was the same as the Paris Metro trains, until the introduction of the MF 77 in September 1978: passengers manually opened the doors by using a handle-based latch, the conductor or motorman closed them prior to departure, and a departure bell signalled that all the doors were locked.

MS 61 trains originally operated on block signalling: in 1989, they were converted for the SACEM signalling system (Système d'aide à la conduite, à l'exploitation et à la maintenance), which currently operates on the core section of RER A.

=== Power ===
The MS 61 trains were single-voltage units that only operated on RATP's 1,500 kV DC network: they could not serve the Cergy-le-Haut (A3) and Poissy (A5) branches, because those branches used SNCF's 25 kV / 50 Hz AC electrification.

=== Numbering and formation ===
- Type A: M.15001 to M.15031 + AB.18001 to 18015
- Type B: M.15032 to M.15124 + AB.18016 to 18062
- Type C: M.15125 to M.15148 + AB.18063 to 18074
- Type D: M.15149 to M.15216 + AB.18075 to 18108
- Type E: M.15217 to M.15236 + AB.18109 to 18118
- Type Ex: M.15237 to M.15254 + AB.18119 to 18128 (with AB.18128 being the reserve trailer).

In passenger service, the MS 61 series usually ran in two or three pairs (6 or 9 cars), depending on the timetable. They could also run as a single pair, although they rarely did in passenger service.

=== Front design ===
The MS 61 series used three types of dot-matrix displays for the destination panel. When delivered, the MS 61 used four 5×7 panels surrounded by two lights, and was capable to displaying a four-digit service number (e.g. 2026) in amber.

Following the first refurbishment of the 1980s, the destination panel changed to six 5×7 panels, which was capable of displaying the mission code in amber, and the service number in red, without spaces (e.g. NELY01, ZEUS02, etc.).

Following the second refurbishment of the 2000s, the destination panel changed to a single grid of 100×16 pixels, which was capable of alternating between the destination and the mission code and service number. This type of destination panel is also in use on the MI 79 and MI 09 trains, as well as the MI 84 trains that operate on the RER B.

Front designs of the MS61 trains

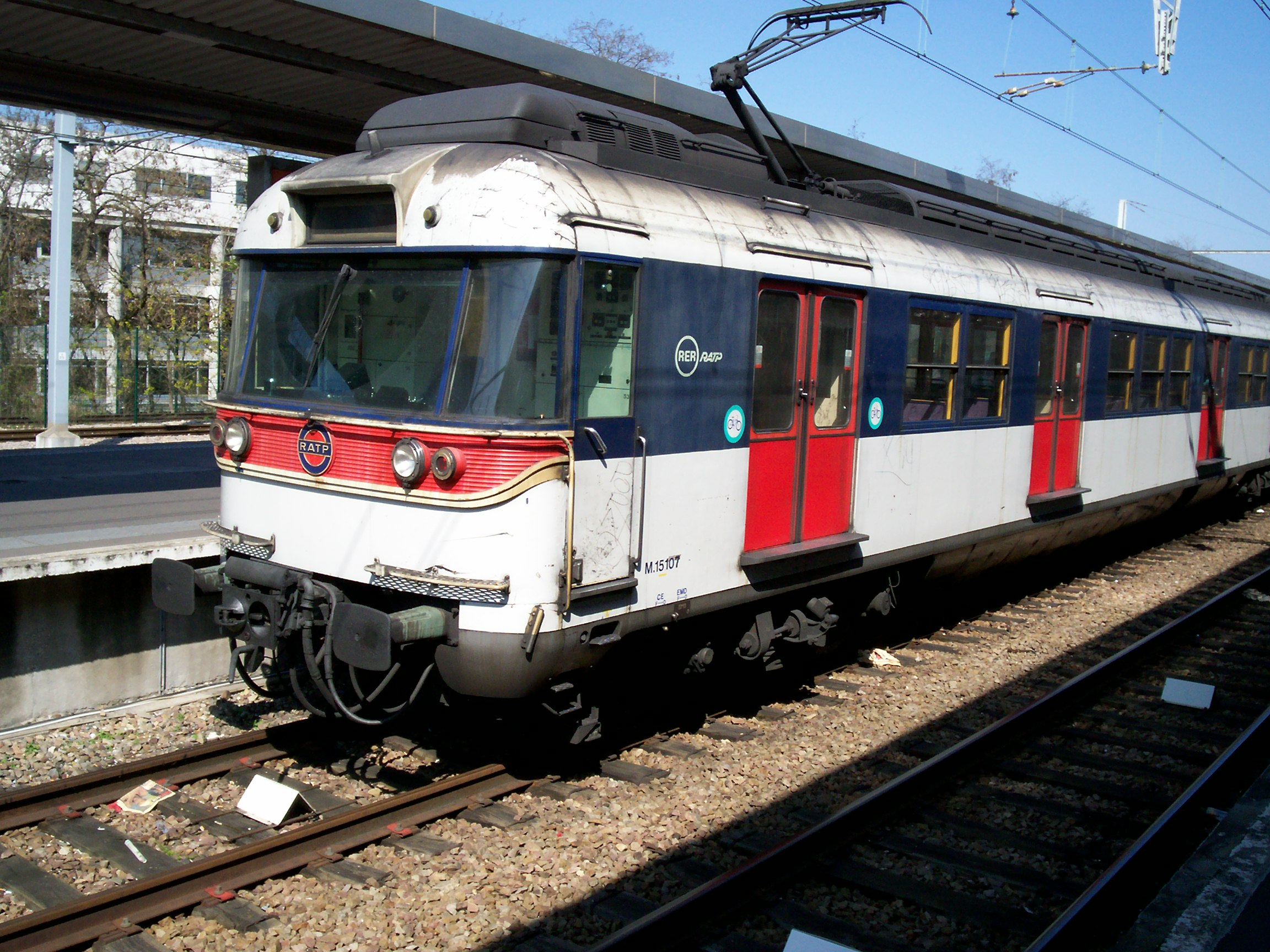
Front design for types A and B

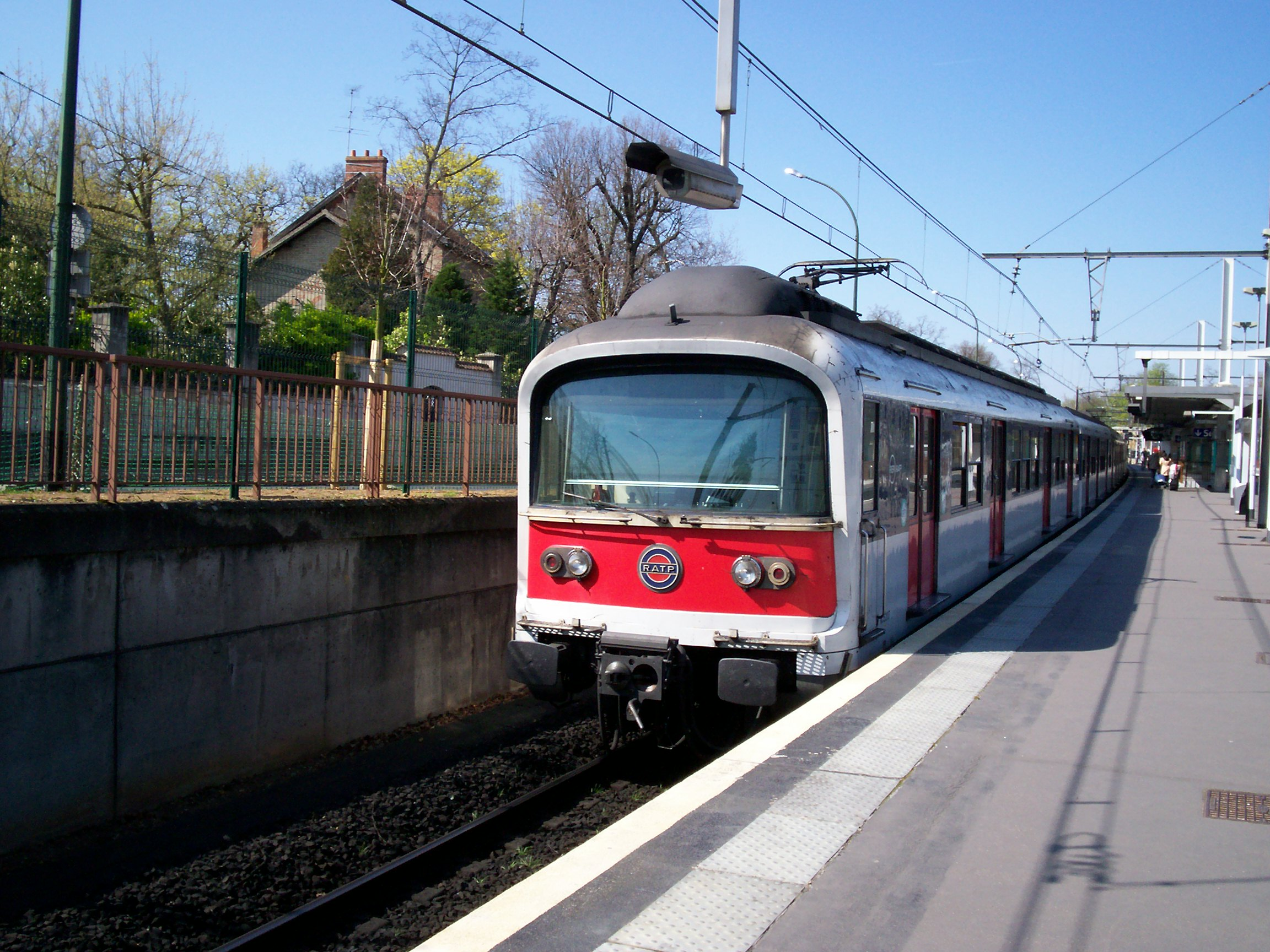
Front design for types C and D

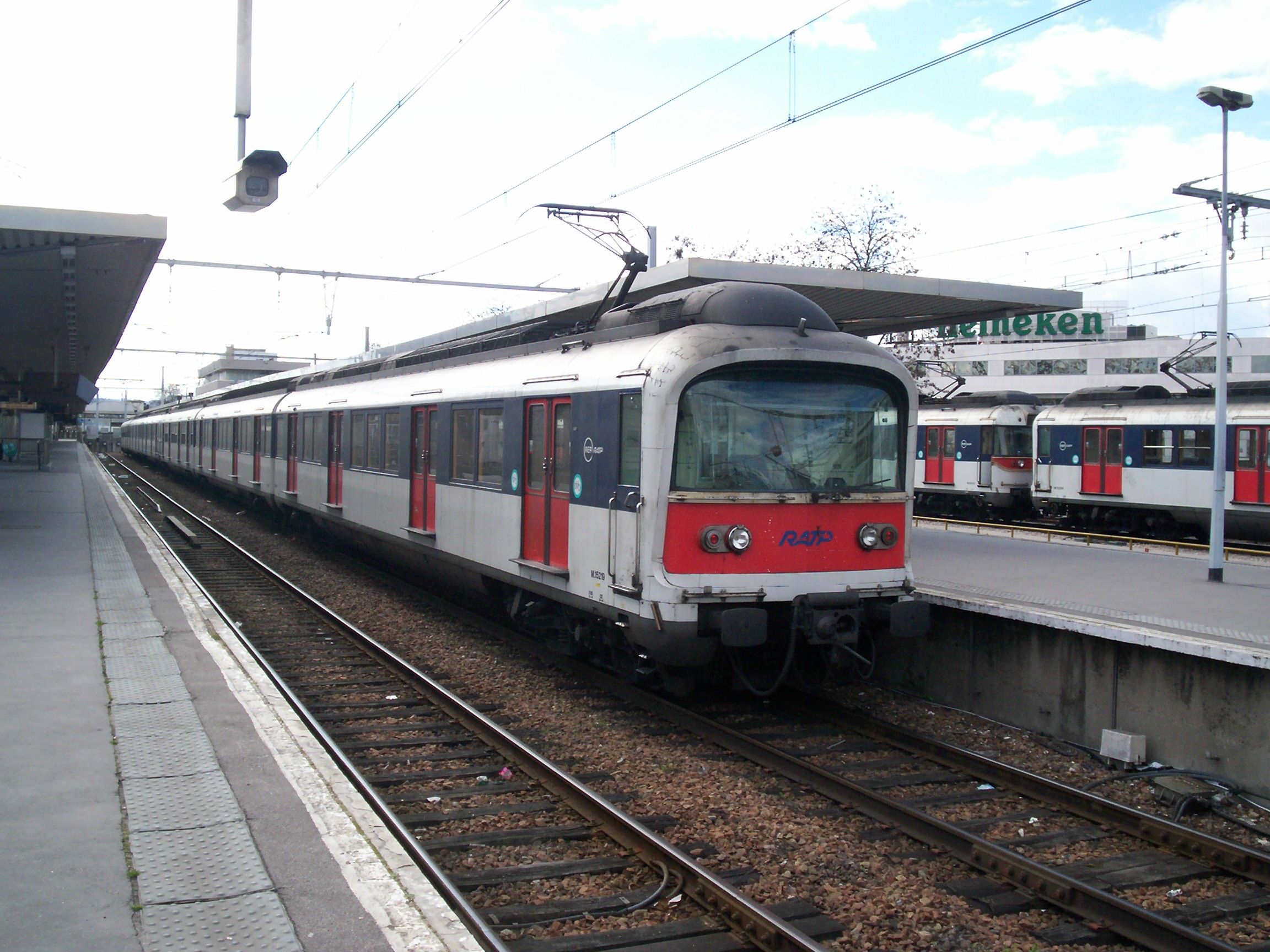
Front design for types E and Ex

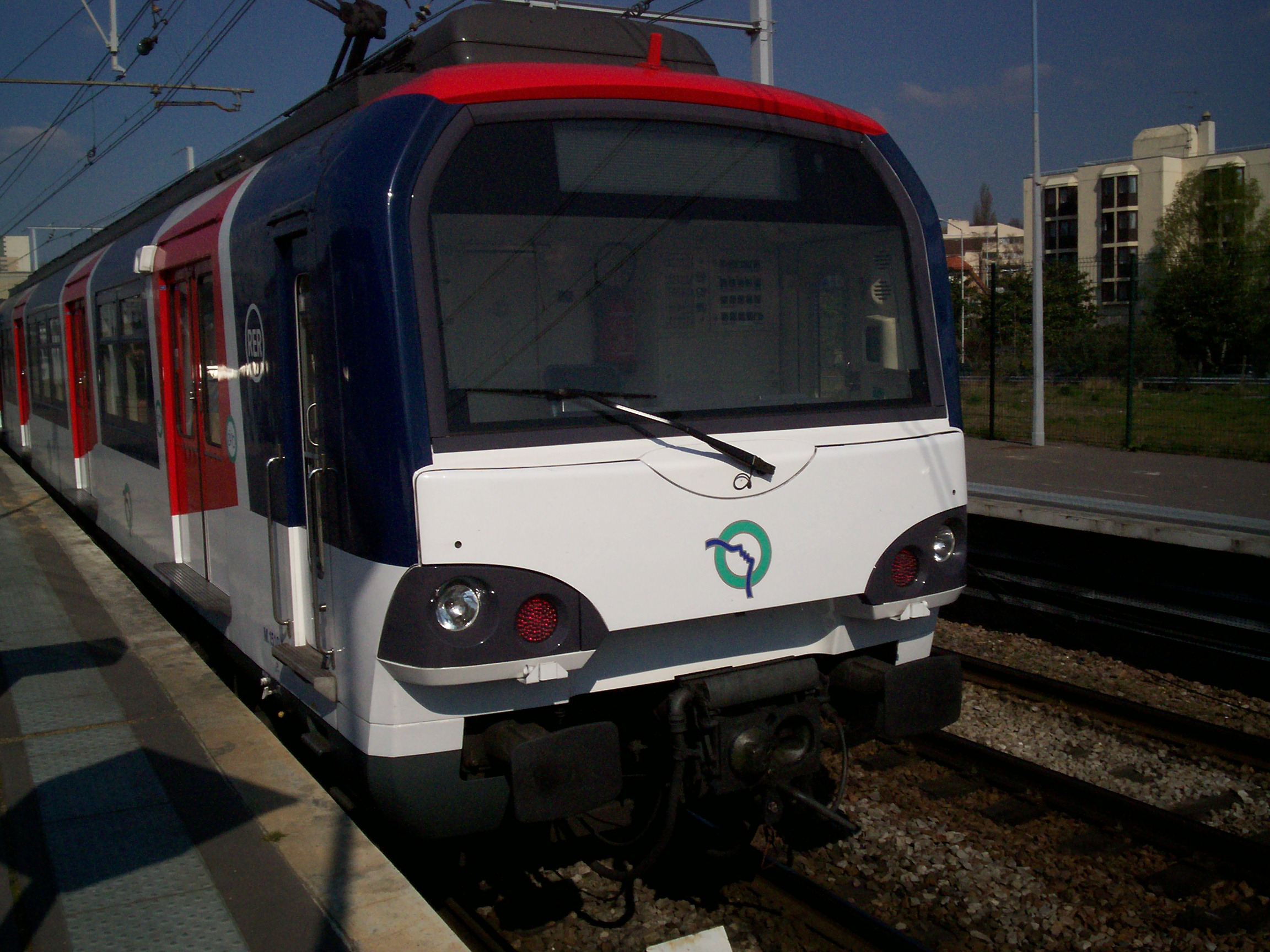
Front design for trains that were refurbished in the late-2000s

=== Liveries ===
RATP has used three liveries for the MS 61 series:

- The first livery was blue and (light) grey, similar to the Paris Metro trains at the time, but without yellow borders. The first class section was denoted by a yellow stripe instead of being painted entirely in cream yellow.
- The second livery, known as the "Île-de-France" livery, was navy and white, with red doors and front panel. Three trains (M.15002-AB.18001-M.15007, M.15053-AB.18046-M.15054 and M.15067-AB.18048-M.15066) carried a variant of the livery to deter graffiti artists.
- The third livery was also navy and white, but the front end had a red roof and white panel with the RATP logo, and large tilted red squares bordered with white to mark the location of the passenger doors.

=== Cooling and ventilation ===
The MS 61 trains were manufactured at a time when cooling on the central section of the RER A was not a major issue: this meant that the trains did not have (and never had) air conditioning fitted, with ventilation originally being provided by single top sash windows on one side of any given car. The sash pane could be lowered enough for anyone to look out ahead.

In the early stages of the second refurbishment in the 2000s, the sash and fixed windows were replaced by hopper windows on both sides to reduce external noise, but passenger complaints regarding poor ventilation during the peak hours resulted in the adoption of an alternating arrangement of hopper and (reinstated) sash windows.

== Accidents and incidents ==
On 19 January 1981, a MS 61 train crashed into the rear of another at Auber, killing one person and injuring 71 others. According to French railway magazine Historail in 2016, the crash was caused by human error relating to a newly installed signal that came into operation two days prior.
