= MI 09 =

Double-deck trainsets operated on the French RER A line

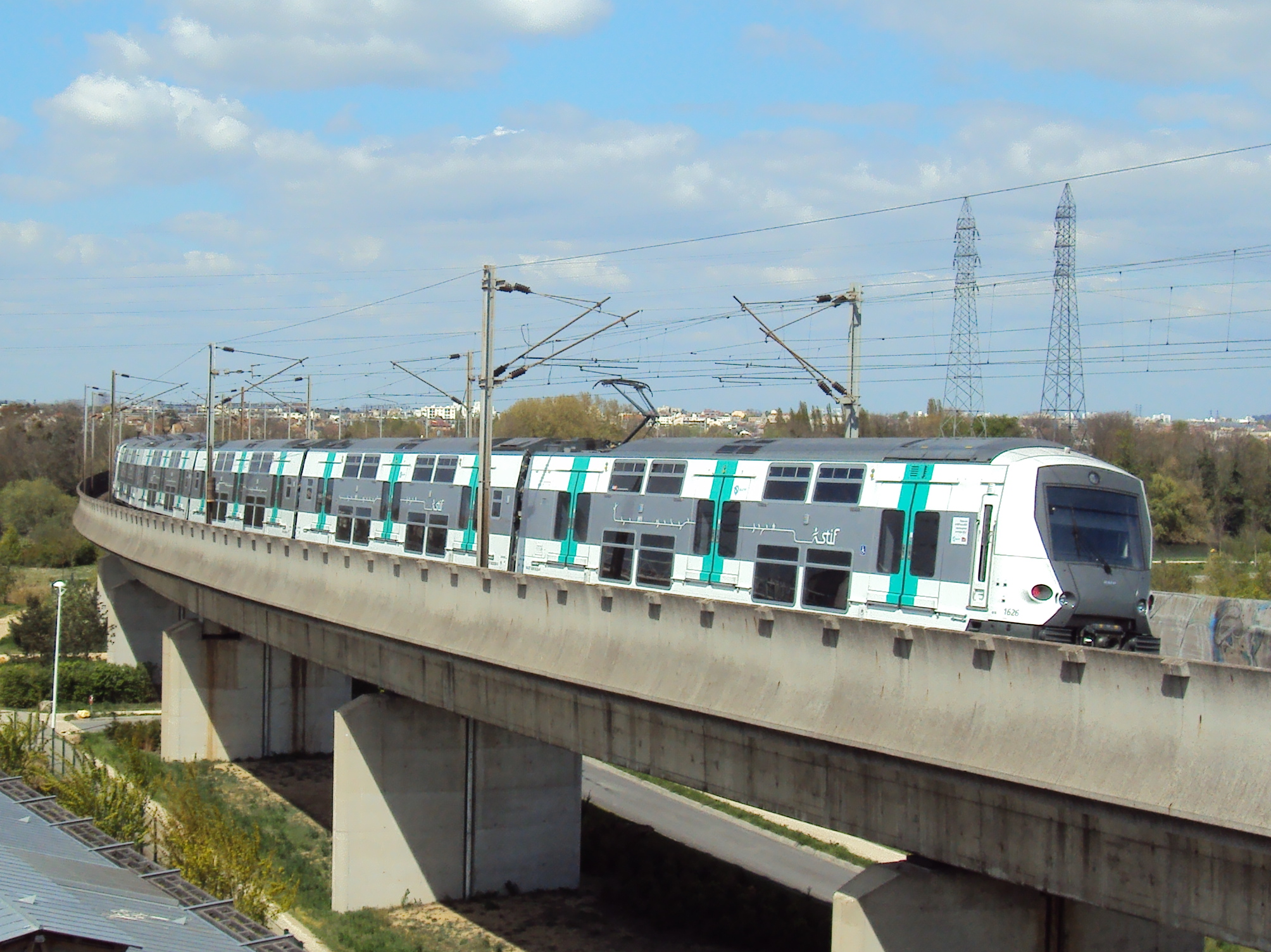
- MI 09 trainset on the Nanterre viaduct
- In service: 5 December 2011–present
- Manufacturers: Alstom and Bombardier
- Family name: X'Trapolis
- Replaced: MS 61
- Constructed: 2010–2017
- Entered service: 5 December 2011
- Number in service: 140 trainsets (700 cars)
- Formation: 5 cars per trainset
- Operators: RATP, SNCF
- Depots: Achères; Rueil-Malmaison; Sucy-en-Brie; Torcy
- Line served: RER RER A

Specifications
- Car body construction: Stainless steel
- Car length: 22 m (72 ft 2 in)
- Width: 2.9 m (9 ft 6 in)
- Height: 4.32 m (14 ft 2 in)
- Doors: 2 × 3 per car
- Maximum speed: 120 km/h (75 mph)
- Weight: 288,000 kg (634,931 lb)
- Traction system: Alstom OniX CADIX IGBT–VVVF (liquid cooled)
- Traction motors: 12 × 325 kW (436 hp) 4 ECA 2846 3-phase AC induction motor (550 V natural ventilation)
- Power output: 3,900 kW (5,200 hp)
- Acceleration: 1.1 m/s^{2} (3.6 ft/s^{2})
- Deceleration: 1.15 m/s^{2} (3.8 ft/s^{2}) (service); 1.25 m/s^{2} (4.1 ft/s^{2}) (emergency)
- HVAC: Refrigerated HVAC and in-train heater
- Electric systems: Overhead line: 25 kV 50 Hz AC; 1,500 V DC
- Current collection: Pantograph (type AX 25)
- UIC classification: 2′2′+Bo′Bo′+Bo′Bo′+Bo′Bo′+2′2′
- Braking systems: Disc, dynamic and regenerative Eddy current brake
- Safety system: SACEM
- Coupling system: Scharfenberg type
- Track gauge: 1,435 mm (4 ft 8 1/2 in) standard gauge

The MI 09 (French: Matériel d'Interconnexion de 2009, lit. 'interconnection rolling stock of 2009') is a double-deck, dual-voltage electric multiple unit trainset operated on line A of the Réseau Express Régional (RER), a hybrid suburban commuter and rapid transit system serving Paris and its surrounding Île-de-France region.

A total of 140 five-car trainsets were built by a consortium of Alstom and Bombardier. Based on the earlier MI 2N series and part of Alstom's X'Trapolis Duplex platform, the MI 09 units were assembled at Alstom's factory in Valenciennes factory and Bombardier's facility in Crespin between 2010 and 2017. The first train entered service on 5 December 2011.

The MI 09 fleet replaced the older MS 61 rolling stock, which was retired in April 2016, and allowed the redeployment of MI 84 units to the RER B by early 2017.

== History ==
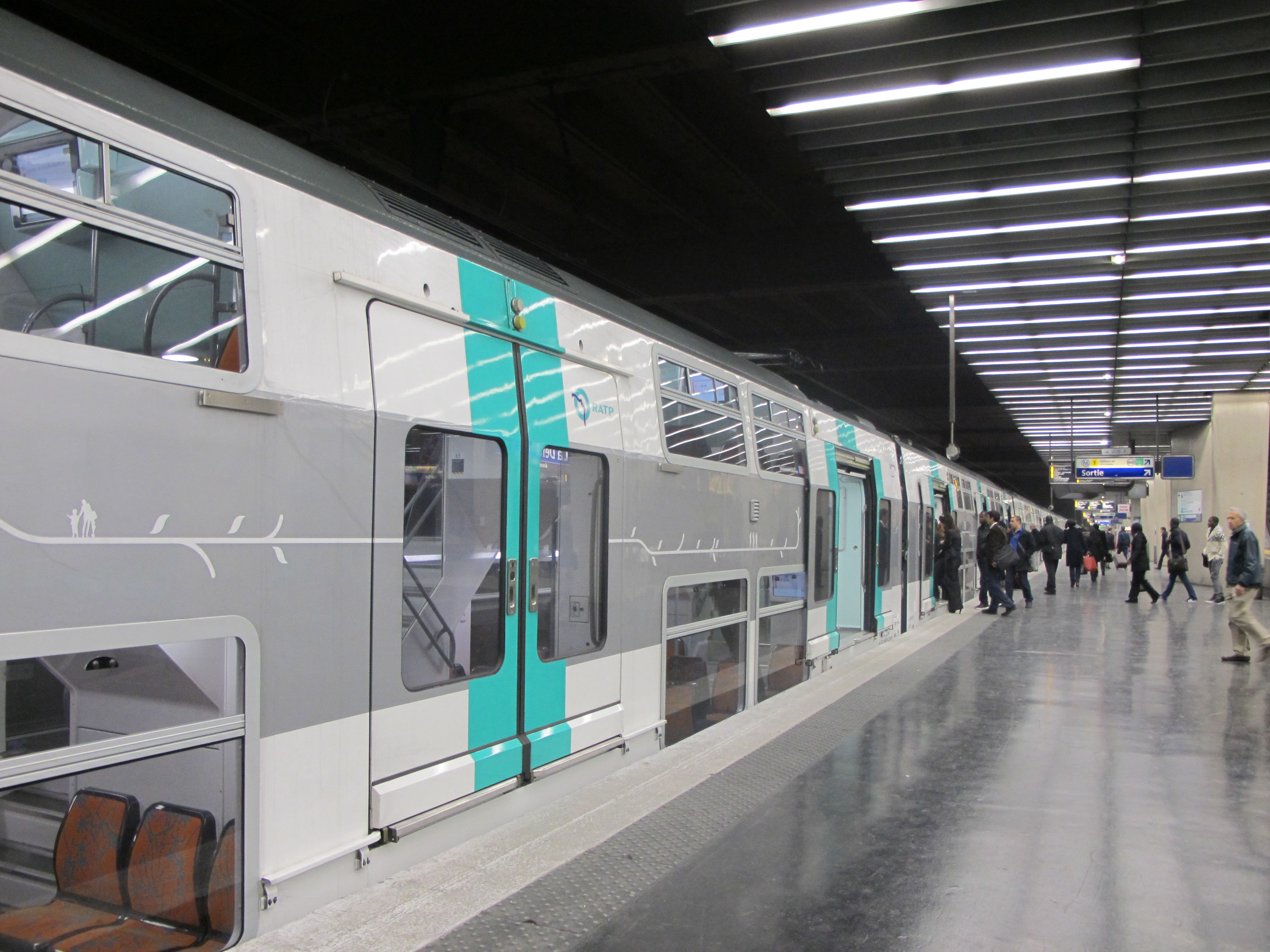
MI 09 train boarding passengers at La Défense station

The RER A line is the busiest in the RER network and among the busiest rail lines in the world, carrying over 1.2 million passengers per day. To alleviate overcrowding, 43 MI 2N double-deck trainsets were introduced in 1998, built by a consortium of Alstom and Bombardier. These trains increased capacity per train to approximately 2,600 passengers, compared to 1,887 for the single-deck MS 61 units that had been used on the RER A since it opened.

The MI 2N series double-deck trains proved so successful that in April 2009, Île-de-France Mobilités (then known as the Transport Syndicate of the Ile de France) and the RATP Group ordered 60 MI 09 trainsets, an improved version of the MI 2N that would be built by the same Alstom-Bombardier consortium. The initial contract was worth €917 million with RATP contributing €617 million and STIF providing the remaining €300 million.

For each five-car trainset, Alstom manufactured the two cab-equipped end cars at its Valenciennes Petite-Forêt factory, while Bombardier manufactured the three intermediate cars at its Crespin plant. In addition, six other Alstom factories supplied parts to the program: the Ornans factory produced the traction motors, the Le Creusot factory supplied the bogies, the Tarbes factory produced traction chain equipment, the Petit Quevilly factory manufactured the main transformer, and both the Saint-Ouen and Villeurbanne factory were involved in supplying the onboard passenger information and electronic control systems. Barat Group performed various elements of the MI 09's assembly, such as the installation of secondary doors, lightings and miscellaneous electronics, a fireproof and soundproof cabin partitions, and other interior fittings.

The first units were unveiled on 8 February 2011, and testing began with three trainsets. The first entered passenger service in December 2011.

A second order for 70 additional trainsets was placed in June 2012, valued at €1 billion, followed by a third order in February 2015 for 10 more sets, worth €150 million. All 140 units were delivered by 2017 at a total cost of €2.067 billion.

The introduction of the MI 09 allowed for the RER's fleet of single-deck MS 61 trains, which dated back to the RER network's opening, to be retired on 16 April 2016. The delivery of the MI 09 also allowed RATP to shift the single-deck MI 84 trains to the RER B by 24 February 2017.

== Design ==
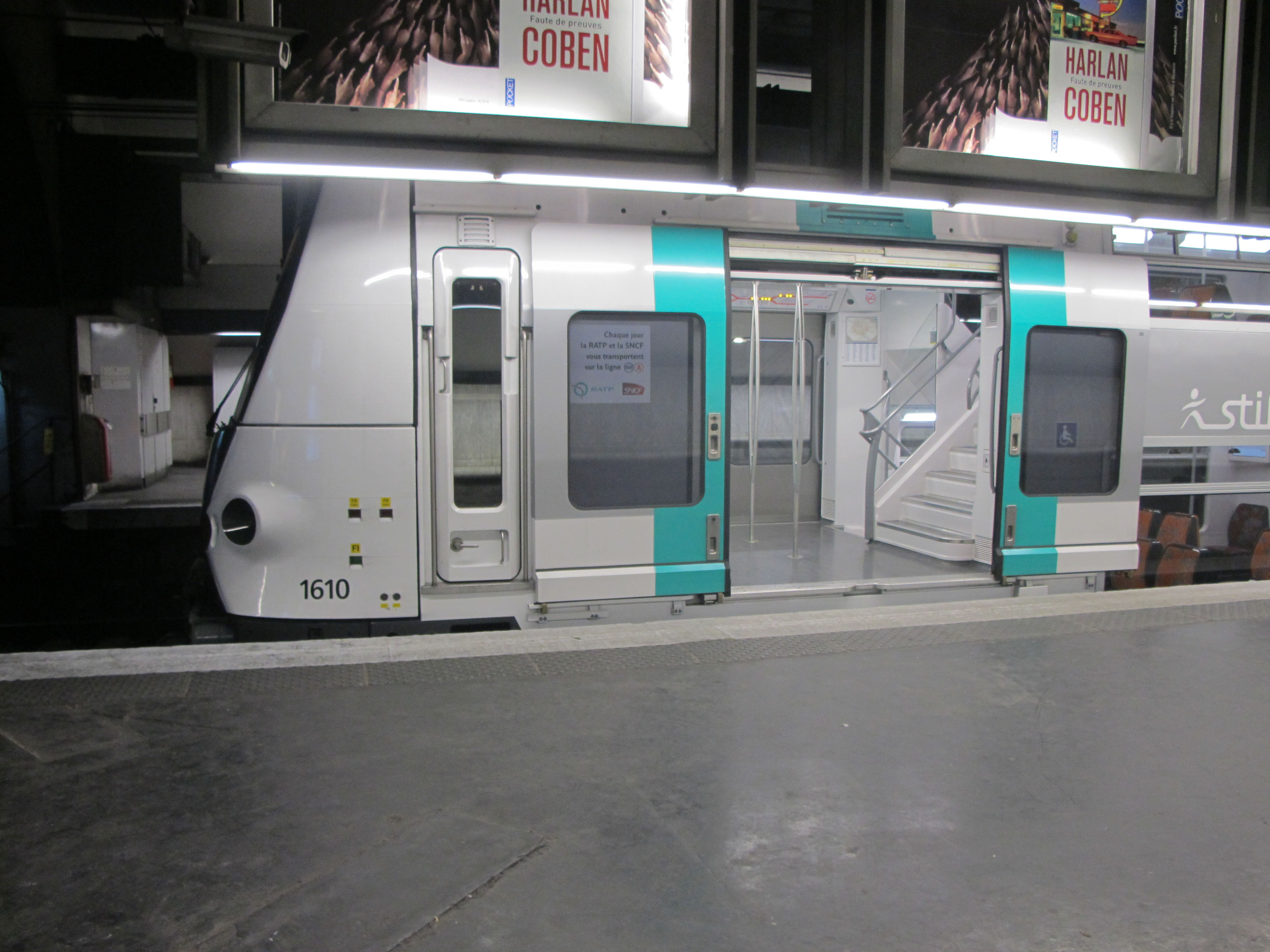
MI 09 train stopped at Charles de Gaulle–Étoile station, showing the wide entry doors, level boarding and stairs to upper and lower decks

Each MI 09 trainset comprises five cars with a total length of 112 metres (367 ft 5 in) and a width of 2.9 metres (9 ft 6 in) 2.9 m (9 ft 6 in). Each train can accommodate approximately 1,300 passengers, both seated and standing. Two trainsets can operate in tandem to form a ten-car train for a maximum capacity of approximately 2.600 To support rapid boarding and alighting, each car has three wide, platform-level doors per side.

Accessibility features include 34 designated seats for passengers with reduced mobility and two spaces for wheelchairs. Additional support bars are installed near priority seating.

The train's maximum design speed is 120 km/h (75 mph).

Energy efficiency features include regenerative braking, a high-performance traction chain, and a refrigerated ventilation system that consumes less energy than a traditional air-conditioning system. A train-to-ground Wi-Fi data link allows real-time monitoring of the train's performance for predictive maintenance.

Electric (regenerative and electrodynamic) braking systems reduce the emission of particulate pollutants from mechanical disc brakes, a significant concern in underground RER stations.

The train’s interior was developed in collaboration with MBD Design. Some of the style choices include boarding areas that provide a full view of both the upper and lower decks, an internal lighting system that uses porthole-shaped fixtures which designers say provide a more pleasant light, and seat fabric with a floral and plant theme.

Each car also features an audio and visual information system, which provides information on the next stop through video monitor graphics and voice announcements. For security and safety purposes, a CCTV surveillance system has been integrated that covers all interior areas.

== Fleet ==
The MI 09 fleet consists of 140 trainsets. All are in service on RER Line A and assigned to the RATP depots at Achères, Rueil-Malmaison, Sucy-en-Brie, and Torcy.

Each trainset follows a 3M2T formation (three powered cars and two non-powered trailers):

RER A	← Cergy-le-Haut/Poissy/Saint-Germain-en-Laye Boissy-Saint-Léger/Marne-la-Vallée–Chessy →				
Car No.	1 >	2	3	4	< 5
Type	Trailer	Motor	Motor	Motor	Trailer
Numbering	ZRBx 1601–1879 (odd numbers)	ZBx 2601–2879 (odd numbers)	ZB 3601–3740 (trainset number)	ZAB 2602–2820 (even numbers)	ZRBx 1602–1820 (even numbers)

Cars 1 and 5 are equipped with pantographs, denoted with < and > in the chart above denoting which is in use in each direction.

== Photo gallery ==
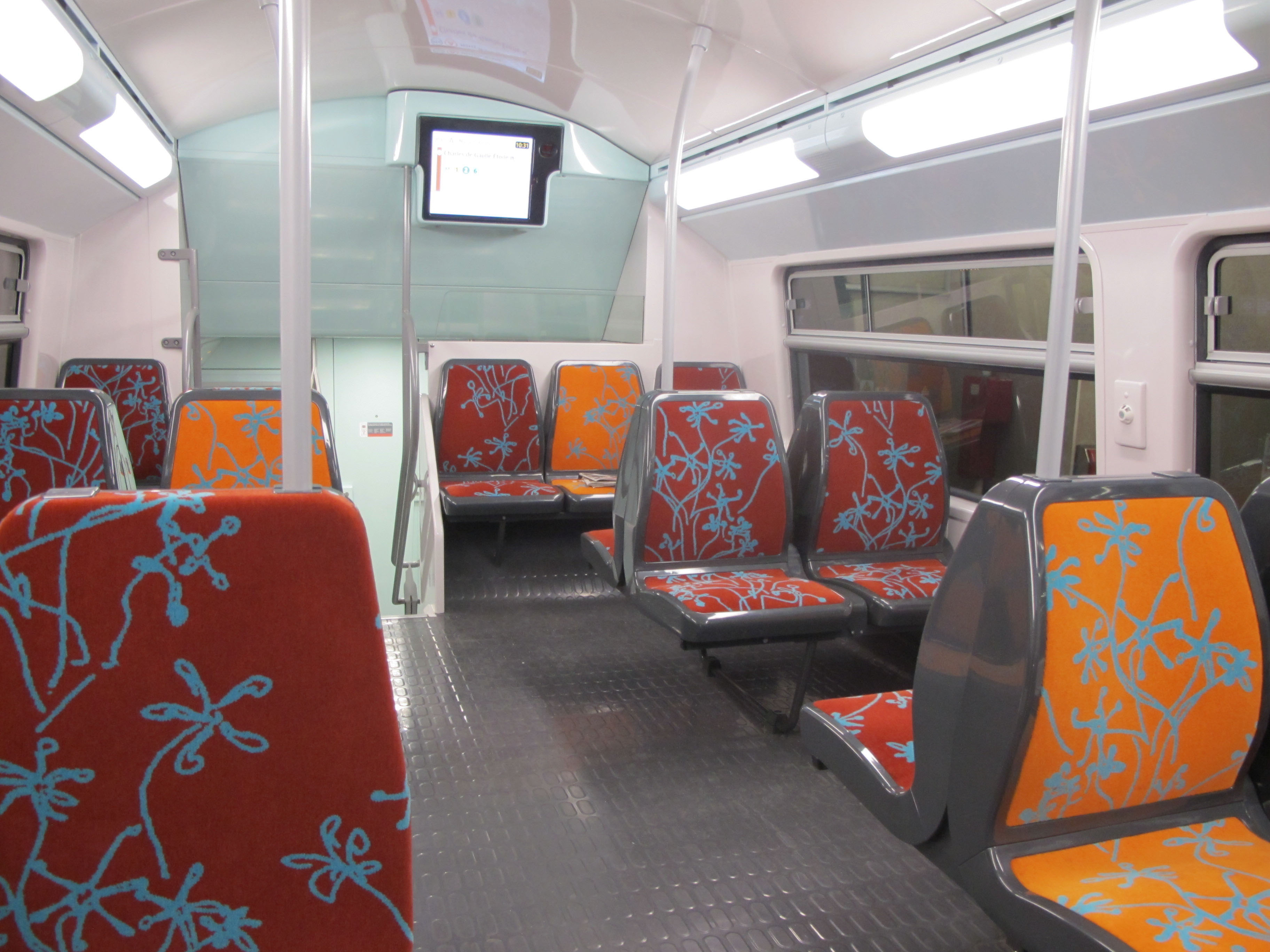
MI 09 interior, upper deck

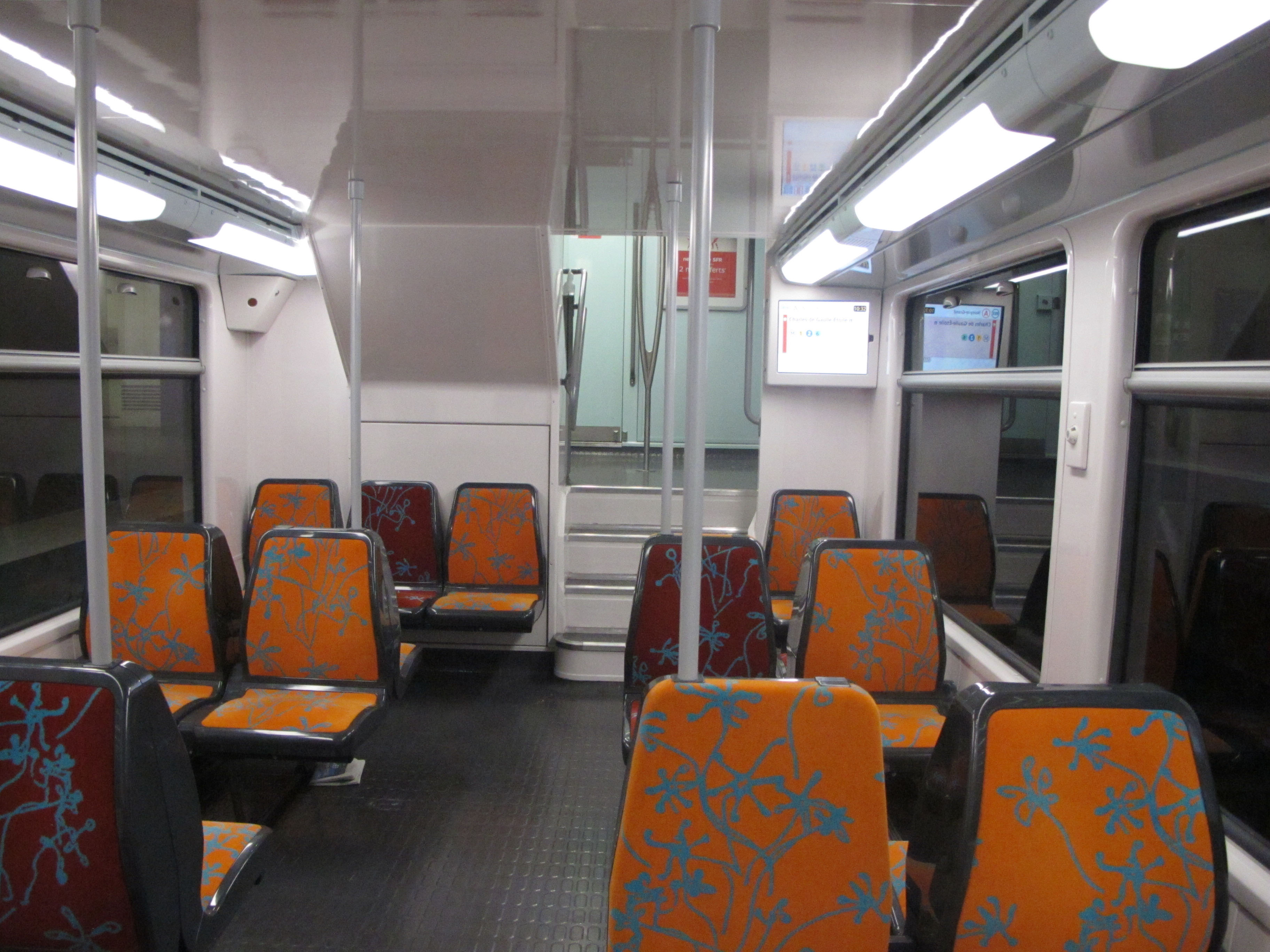
MI 09 interior, lower deck

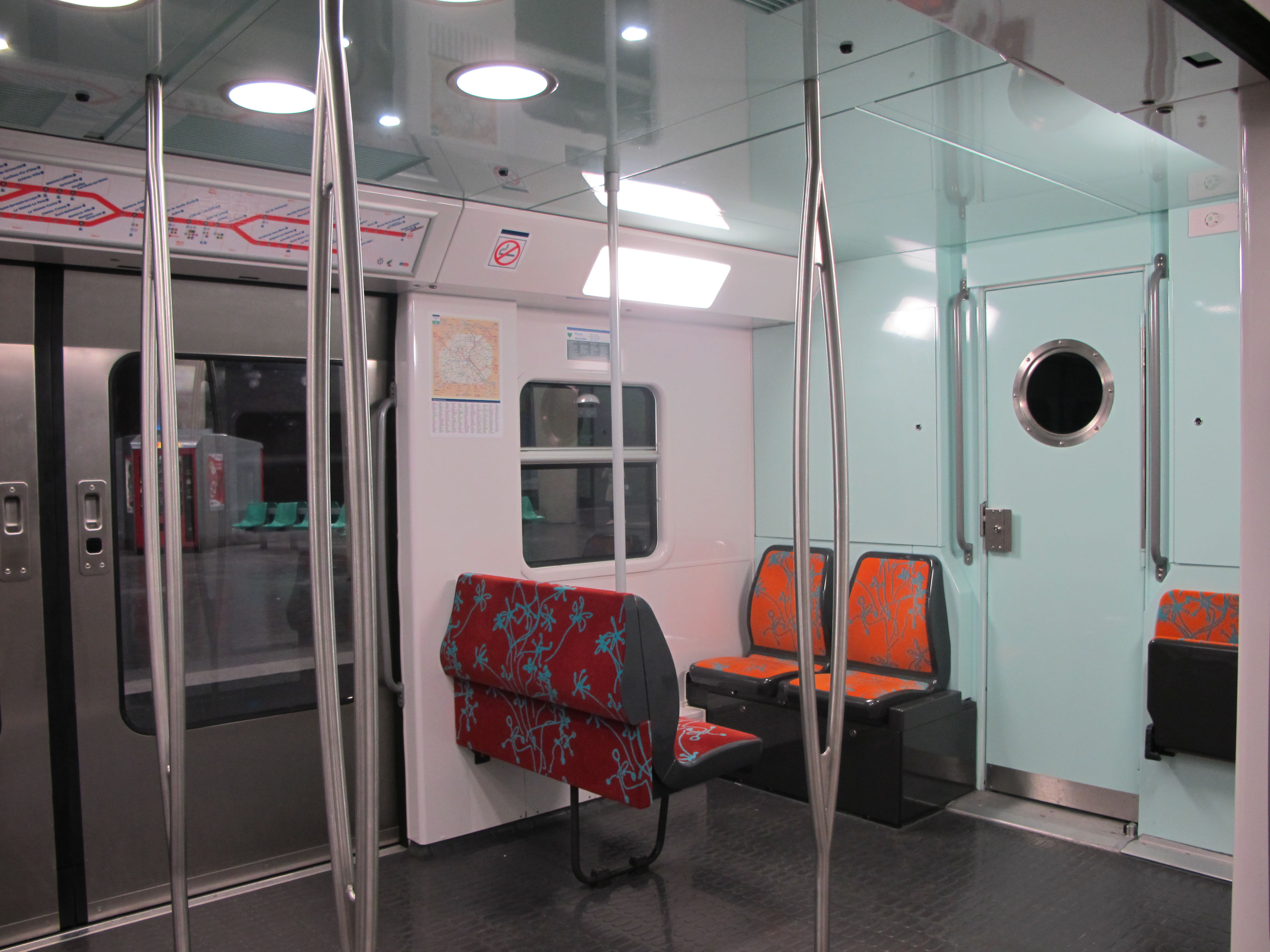
MI 09 interior, boarding area (mid-deck) with space for wheelchairs and seats for passengers who can not use stairs

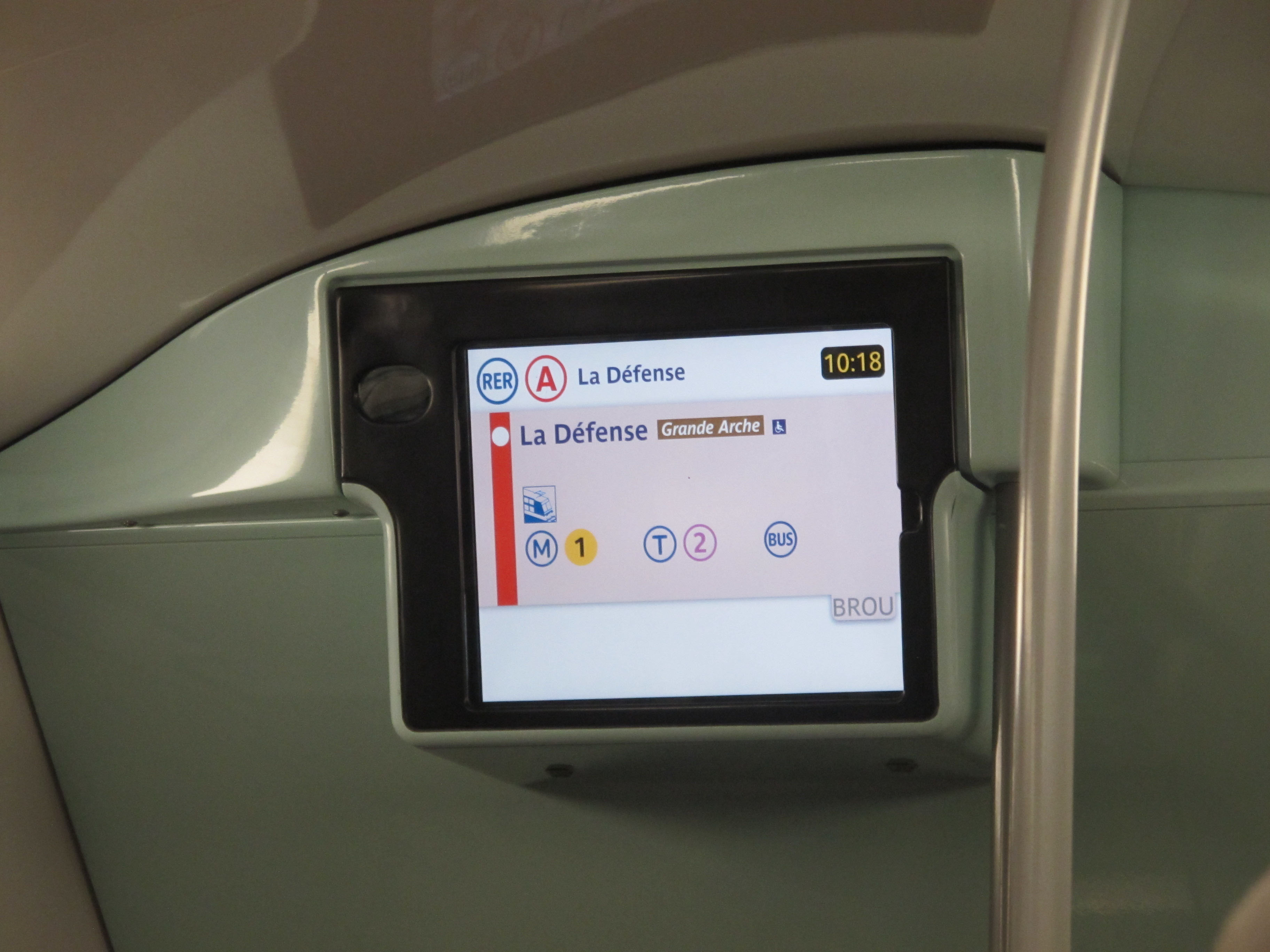
Passenger information screen

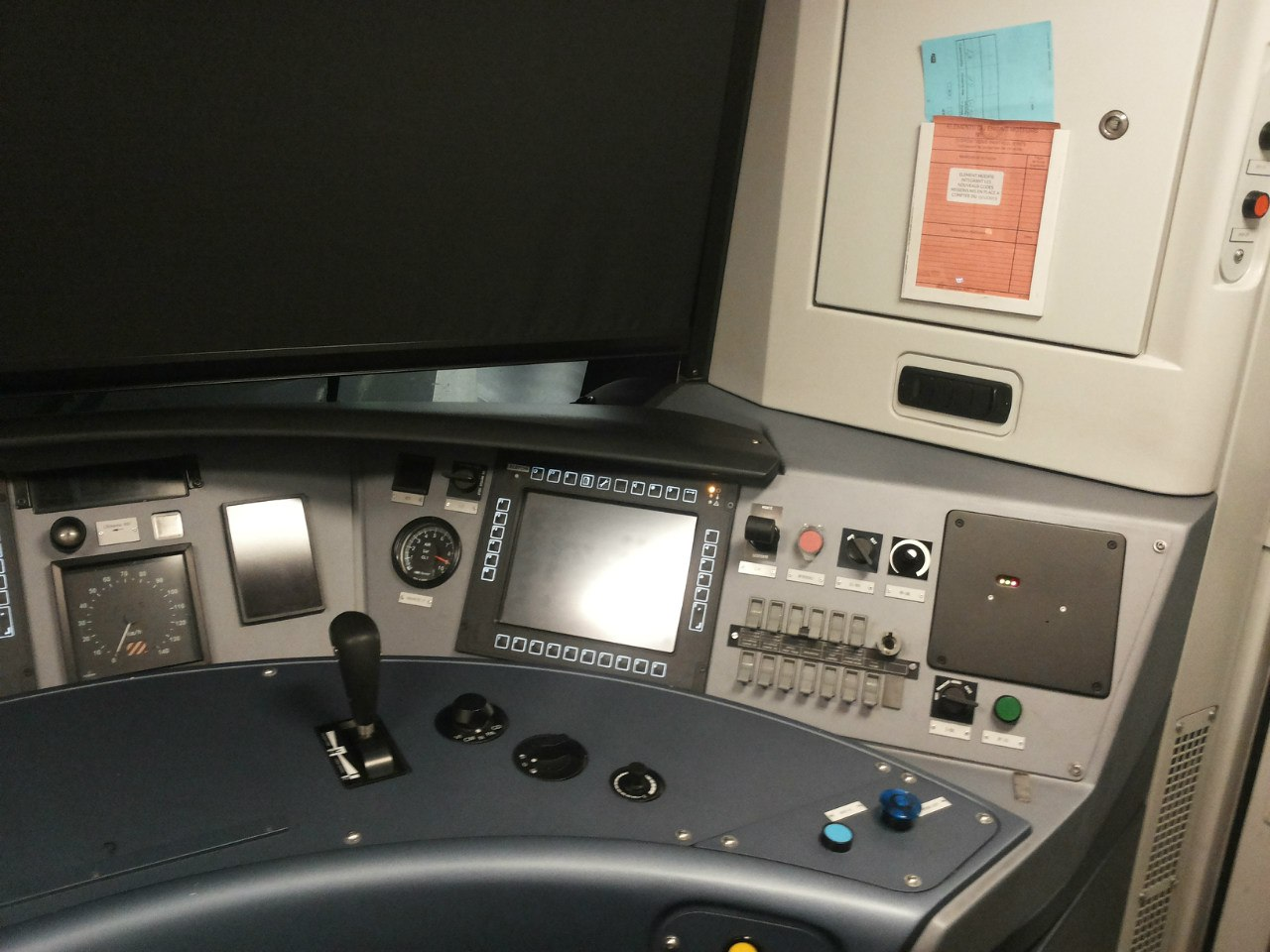
Operators compartment
