= Compagnie française de matériel de chemin de fer =

French rail equipment manufacturer

- Industry: Rail transport engineering and construction
- Founded: 6 November 1872
- Headquarters: Ivry-sur-Seine, France
- Products: Carriages, wagons, bridges

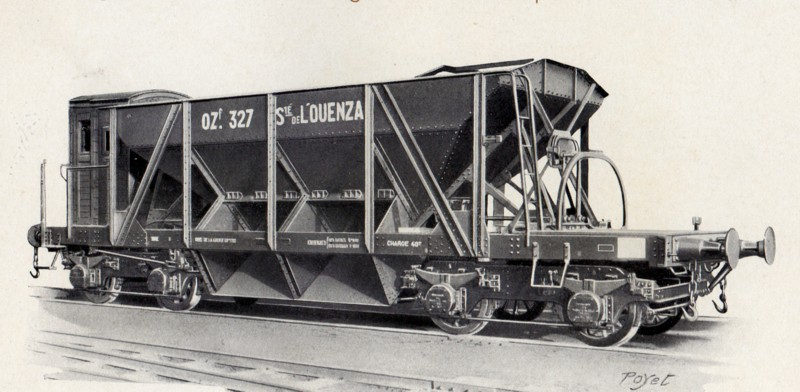

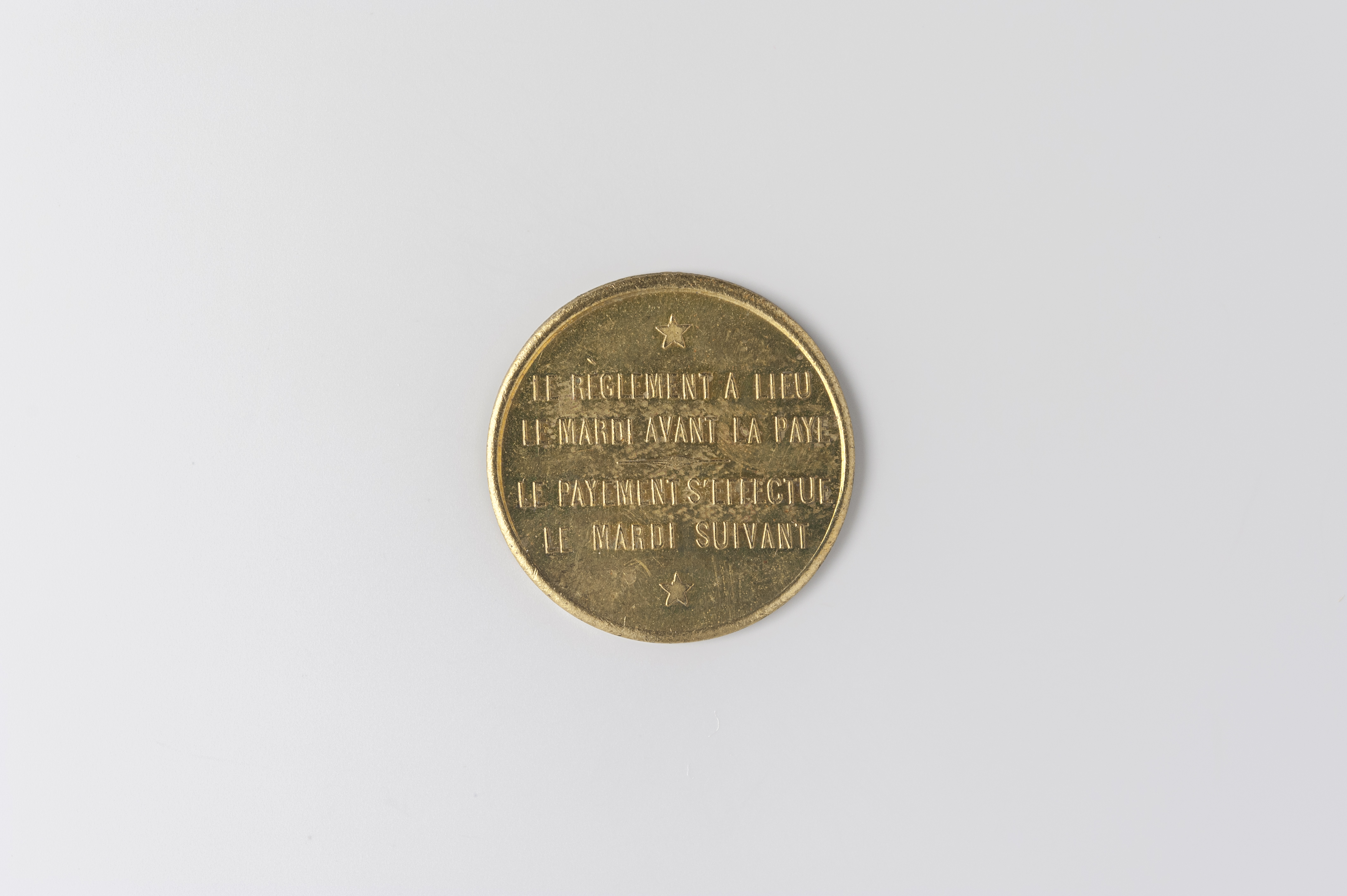

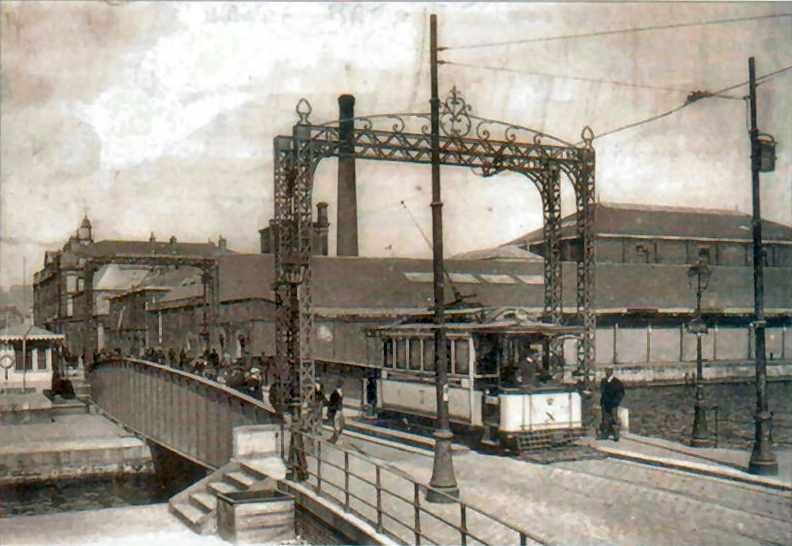

The Compagnie française de matériel de chemin de fer (CFMCF) was a French manufacturer of rail equipment, headquartered in Ivry-sur-Seine, with a factory in Maubeuge.

The company built rolling stock for the French railways and French colonies.

== History ==
The company was founded in 1872, with a capital of 2,500,000 francs to utilise the works of the Société Charles Bonnefond et Cie. in Ivry-sur-Seine.

In 1911 the company acquired the Tilleul works ("le Bois du Tilleul" founded 1844.) in Maubeuge. (Note: Part of the factory is now a historic monument, and has been converted to house the educational establishment lycée Notre-Dame du Tilleu.) The factory closed in 1970.

In 1919 CFMCF along with five others: the Forges et aciéries de la Marine et Homécourt, the Chemins de fer de Paris à Lyon et à la Méditerranée (PLM), Compagnie du chemin de fer de Paris à Orléans (PO), établissements Schneider, and the Société des forges de Châtillon-Commentry-Neuves-Maison founded a new company: the Compagnie générale de construction et d'entretien du matériel de chemin de fer (CGCEM) with a capital of 15 million francs; the new company's business was the repair and maintenance of railway vehicles, and had works in Nevers and Villefranche-sur-Saône serving the PLM, and at Saint-Pierre-des-Corps serving the PO.
