= Retention =

Retention may refer to:

== General ==
- Recall (memory), in learning, the ability to recall facts and figures in memory
- Memory and retention in learning
- Selective retention
- Cultural retention
- Customer retention
- University student retention
- Employee retention, the ability to keep employees within an organization
- Forced retention
- Grade retention, in schools, keeping a student in the same grade for another year (that is, not promoting the student to the next higher grade with their classmates)
- Retention or retainage of an agreed portion of a contract price until project completion
- Retention basin
- Retention election, in the United States court system, a process whereby a judge is periodically subject to a vote in order to remain in the position of judge
- Retention rate
- Retention ratio, in company earnings
- Retention of vision, in magic
- Water retention (medicine), abnormal accumulation of fluid in the body
- Urinary retention, the lack or inability to urinate
- Variable retention, in land management and forestry conservation

== Information and records ==
- Retention (news server), in Usenet, the time a news server holds a newsgroup posting before deleting it as no longer relevant
- Data retention, in law and computing
  - Data retention (telecommunication)
- Retention period, of a document, in records management
- Retention of title clause, in law

== Chemistry ==
- Retention agent, a process chemical
- Carbon dioxide retention
- Retention of configuration, in chemical reactions
- ER retention, proteins retained in the endoplasmic reticulum after folding
- Retention factor

== Maths ==
- Retention distance
- Retention uniformity

== See also ==
- Water retention (disambiguation)
- Retainer (disambiguation)
