= CRF =

CRF or crf may refer to:

== Science and technology ==
- Corticotropin-releasing factor family, a family of related neuropeptides in vertebrates
  - Corticotropin-releasing hormone, or corticotropin-releasing factor, a polypeptide hormone
- Chromatographic response function, a coefficient which characterizes the quality of the separation in the result of a chromatography
- Coefficient of rolling friction, a coefficient that measures the rolling resistance
- Cloud radiative forcing, the difference between the radiation budget components for average cloud conditions and cloud-free conditions
- Chemotactic range fitting, a phenomenon in which organisms direct their movements according to certain chemicals
- Controlled-release fertiliser, a solid form fertilizer
- Coupled rangefinder camera, a camera fitted with a rangefinder
- Case report form, a document in clinical trial research

=== Computing ===
- Conditional random field, in machine learning, a type of graphical model
- Constant Rate Factor, in video encoders (x265, and VP9, and AV1), a bitrate control method

=== Medicine ===
- Cardiorespiratory fitness, a medical term
- Case report form, in a clinical trial, the document showing all the evaluated patient data
- Cancer-related fatigue, fatigue experienced with cancer patients
- Chronic renal failure, also known as chronic kidney disease (CKD)

== Economics and finance ==
- Capital recovery factor, a financial concept
- Consolidated Revenue Fund, the main government bank account in many Commonwealth Nations

== Organisations ==
- Coalition for Religious Freedom, a group affiliated with the Unification Church also aka International Coalition for Religious Freedom
- Catholic Reaction Force, a name used by paramilitaries to issue death threats against Protestants in Northern Ireland during "The Troubles"
- Cave Research Foundation, an American private, non-profit group dedicated to the exploration, research, and conservation of caves
- Central Readiness Force, a military defense unit in Japan
- Centro Ricerche Fiat, the central research organization for Fiat; see Blue&Me
- Air Central (Japan), a defunct regional airline of Japan (1988–2010)

== Sports ==
- Circle rules football, a variation on football with only one goal
- Cyprus Rugby Federation, the governing body for rugby union in Cyprus
- Clube de Regatas do Flamengo, a Brazilian football club based in Rio de Janeiro

== Other uses ==
- Honda CRF series, a series of motorcycles
- Carolina Renaissance Festival, a festival held annually in North Carolina, United States
- Charter of Rights and Freedoms, a bill of rights entrenched in the Constitution of Canada
- Caramanta language, an ISO 639-3 code
