= Railway electrification =

Conversion of railways to use electricity for propulsion

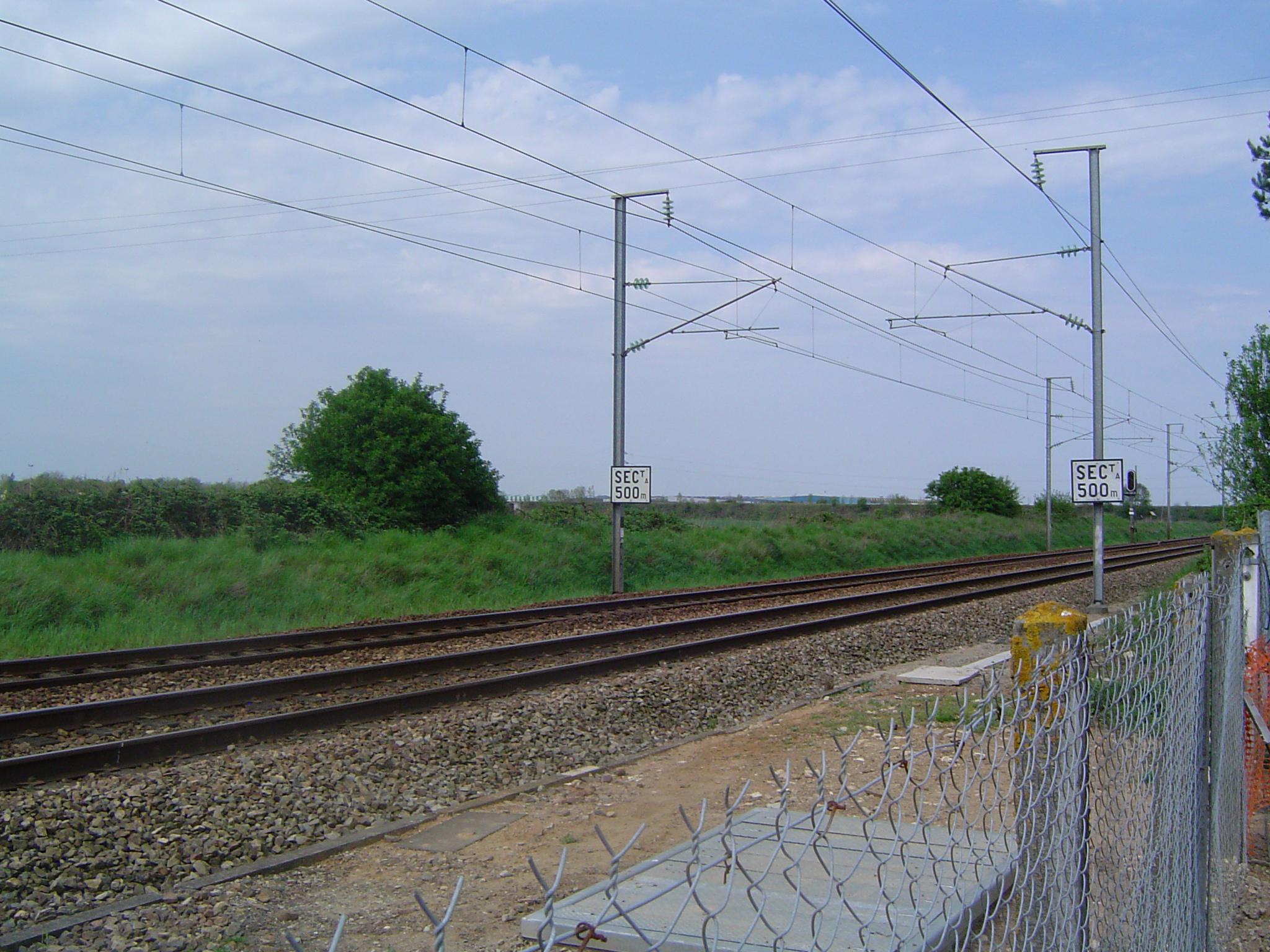
The Mantes-la-Jolie–Cherbourg railway in France connects Grand Paris and Normandy, and is electrified using overhead lines at 25 kV AC 50 Hz.

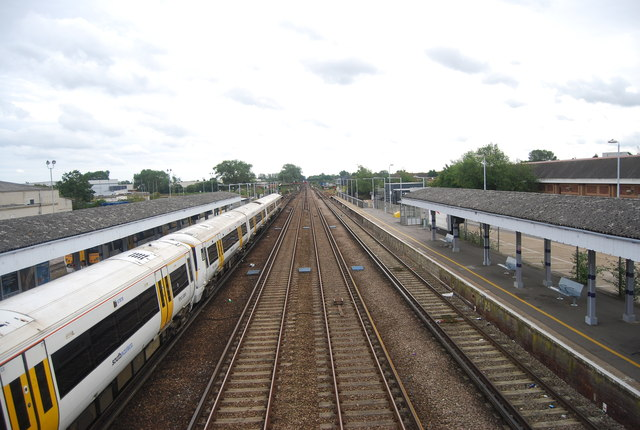
The South Eastern Main Line in England connects the London metropolitan area with the Strait of Dover, and is electrified using a third rail at 750 V DC.

Railway electrification is the use of electric power for the propulsion of rail transport. Electric railways use either electric locomotives (hauling passenger or freight in separate cars), electric multiple units (passenger or freight cars with their own motors) or both. Electricity is typically generated in large and relatively efficient generating stations, transmitted to the railway network and distributed to the trains. Some electric railways have their own dedicated generating stations and transmission lines, but most purchase power from an electric utility. The railway usually provides its own distribution lines, switches, and transformers.

Power is supplied to moving trains with a (nearly) continuous conductor running along the track that usually takes one of two forms: an overhead line, suspended from poles or towers along the track or from structure or tunnel ceilings and contacted by a pantograph, or a third rail mounted at track level and contacted by a sliding "pickup shoe". Both overhead wire and third-rail systems usually use the running rails as the return conductor, but some systems use a separate fourth rail for this purpose.

In comparison to the principal alternative, the diesel engine, electric railways offer substantially better energy efficiency, lower emissions, and lower operating costs. Electric locomotives are also usually quieter, more powerful, and more responsive and reliable than diesel locomotives. They have no local emissions, an important advantage in tunnels and urban areas. Some electric traction systems provide regenerative braking that turns the train's kinetic energy back into electricity and returns it to the supply system to be used by other trains or the general utility grid. While diesel locomotives burn petroleum products, electricity can be generated from diverse sources, including renewable energy. Historically, concerns of resource independence have played a role in the decision to electrify railway lines. Landlocked Switzerland which almost completely lacks oil or coal deposits but has plentiful hydropower electrified its network in part in reaction to supply issues during both World Wars.

Disadvantages of electric traction include high capital costs that may be uneconomic on lightly trafficked routes and a vulnerability to power interruptions. The cost of electrification can significantly affect the cost-effectiveness of spur lines, yards, and low frequency or underutilized routes. Electro-diesel locomotives and electro-diesel multiple units mitigate these problems somewhat as they are capable of running on diesel power during an outage or on non-electrified spurs.

The cost of electrification is a much smaller problem in projects with many structures. The labor and material required for bridges, viaducts, tunneling and trenching are generally much more expensive than for electrification. This is why projects that built in urban areas, which usually require elevation or tunneling are the ideal candidates for electrification.

One other complication with electrification comes from the differing historic electrification standards of many systems. Different regions may use different supply voltages and frequencies, complicating through service and requiring greater complexity of locomotive power. There used to be a historical concern for double-stack rail transport regarding clearances with overhead lines but it is no longer universally true as of 2022, with both Indian Railways and China Railway regularly operating electric double-stack cargo trains under overhead lines.

Railway electrification has constantly increased in the past decades, and as of 2022, electrified tracks account for nearly one-third of the total tracks globally.

== History ==
Railway electrification is the development of powering trains and locomotives using electricity instead of diesel or steam power. The history of railway electrification dates back to the late 19th century when the first electric tramways were introduced in cities like Berlin, London, and New York City.

In 1881, the first permanent railway electrification in the world was the Gross-Lichterfelde Tramway in Berlin, Germany. Overhead line electrification was first applied successfully by Frank Sprague in Richmond, Virginia in 1887-1888, and led to the electrification of hundreds of additional street railway systems by the early 1890s. The first electrification of a mainline railway was the Baltimore and Ohio Railroad's Baltimore Belt Line in the United States in 1895–96.

The early electrification of railways used direct current (DC) power systems, which were limited in terms of the distance they could transmit power. However, in the early 20th century, alternating current (AC) power systems were developed, which allowed for more efficient power transmission over longer distances.

In the 1920s and 1930s, many countries worldwide began to electrify their railways. In Europe, Switzerland, Sweden, France, Germany, and Italy were among the early adopters of railway electrification. In the United States, the New York, New Haven and Hartford Railroad was one of the first major railways to be electrified.

Railway electrification continued to expand throughout the 20th century, with technological improvements and the development of high-speed trains and commuters. Today, many countries have extensive electrified railway networks with 375000 km of standard lines in the world, including China, India, Japan, France, Germany, and the United Kingdom. Electrification is seen as a more sustainable and environmentally friendly alternative to diesel or steam power and is an important part of many countries' transportation infrastructure.

== Classification ==
Electrification systems in Europe: Non-electrified 750 V DC 1.5 kV DC 3 kV DC 15 kV AC 25 kV AC High speed lines in France, Spain, Italy, United Kingdom, the Netherlands, Belgium and Turkey operate under 25 kV, as do high power lines in the former Soviet Union as well.

Electrification systems are classified by three main parameters:

- Voltage
- Current
  - Direct current (DC)
  - Alternating current (AC)
    - Frequency
- Contact system
  - Overhead lines (catenary)
  - Third rail
  - Fourth rail
  - Ground-level power supply

The selection of an electrification system is based on the economics of energy supply, maintenance, and capital cost compared to the revenue obtained for freight and passenger traffic. Different systems are used for urban and intercity areas; some electric locomotives can switch to different supply voltages to allow flexibility in operation.

=== Standardised voltages ===
Six of the most commonly used voltages have been selected for European and international standardisation. Some of these are independent of the contact system used, so that, for example, 750 V DC may be used with either third rail or overhead lines.

There are many other voltage systems used for railway electrification systems around the world, and the list of railway electrification systems covers both standard voltage and non-standard voltage systems.

The permissible range of voltages allowed for the standardised voltages is as stated in standards BS EN 50163 and IEC 60850. These take into account the number of trains drawing current and their distance from the substation.

Electrification system	Voltage				
Electrification system	Minimum temporary	Minimum permanent	Nominal	Maximum permanent	Maximum temporary
600 V DC	400 V		600 V	720 V	800 V
750 V DC	500 V		750 V	900 V	1,000 V
1,500 V DC	1,000 V		1,500 V	1,800 V	1,950 V
3 kV DC	2 kV		3 kV	3.6 kV	3.9 kV
15 kV AC, 16.7 Hz	11 kV	12 kV	15 kV	17.25 kV	18 kV
25 kV AC, 50 Hz (EN 50163) and 60 Hz (IEC 60850)	17.5 kV	19 kV	25 kV	27.5 kV	29 kV

== Direct current ==
=== Overhead lines ===
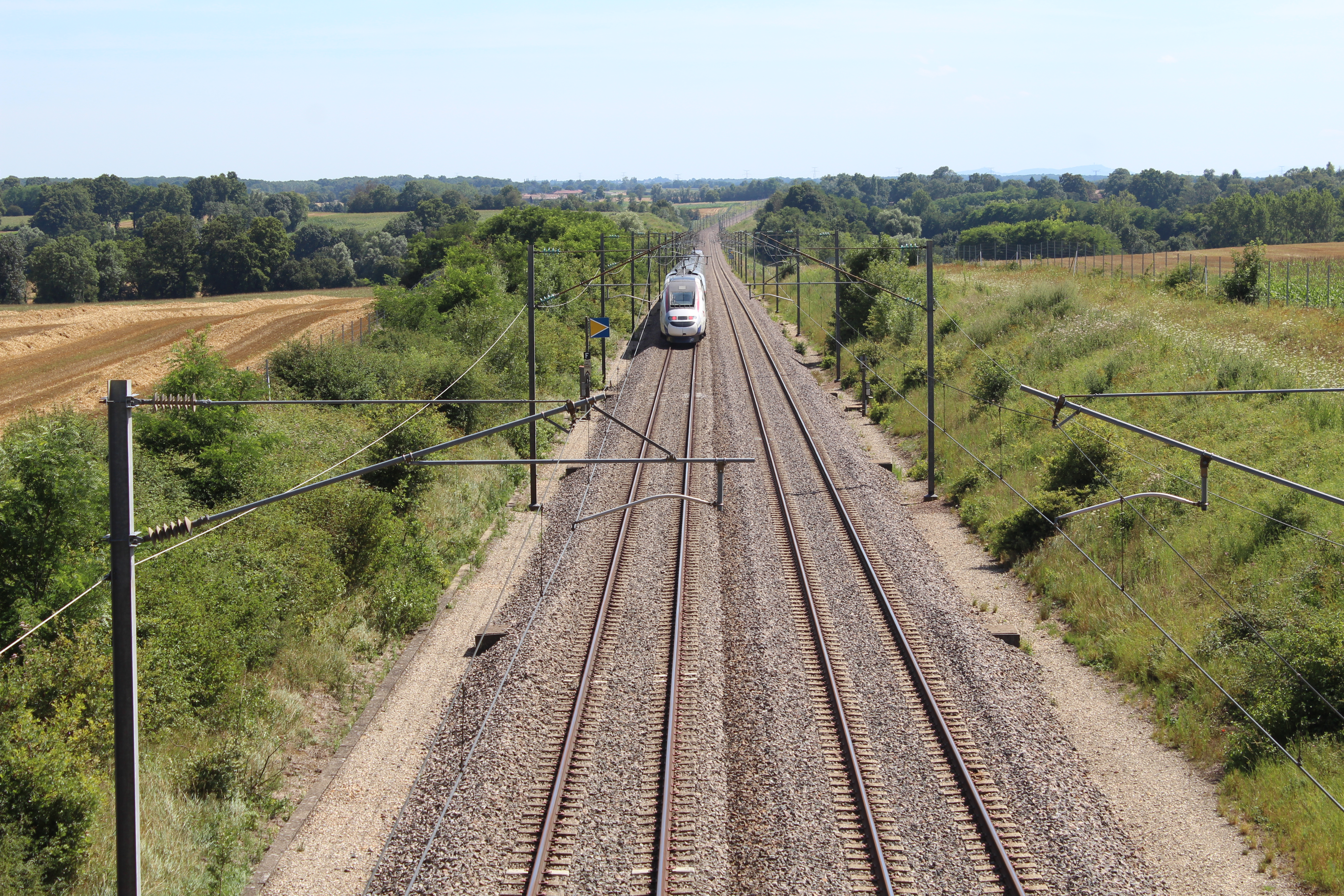
The LGV Sud-Est in France is electrified using 25 kV 50 Hz overhead lines.

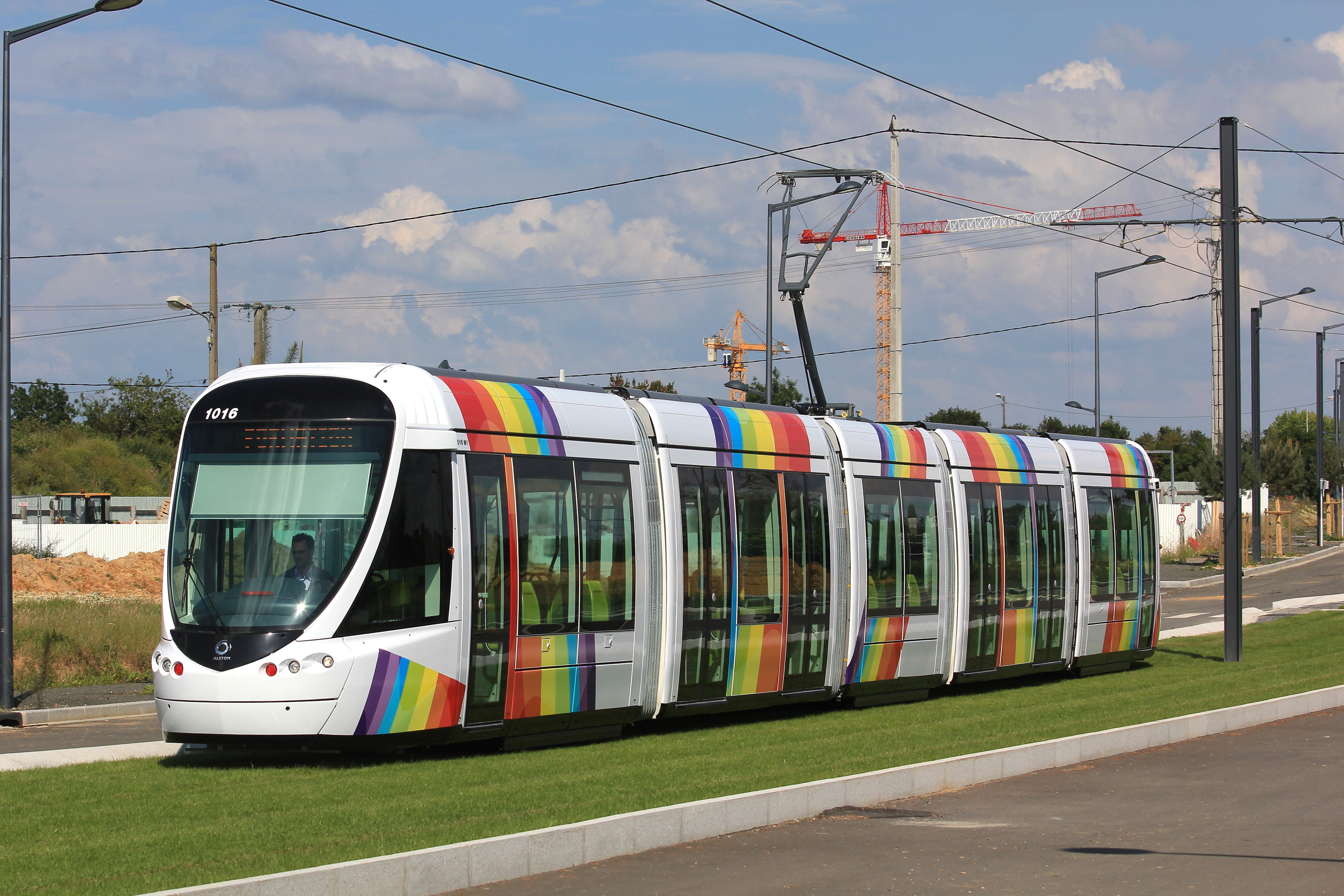
The Angers tramway in Angers, France uses 750 V DC overhead lines, in common with many other modern tram systems.

1,500 V DC is used in Japan, Indonesia, Hong Kong (parts), Ireland, Australia (parts), France (also using 25 kV 50 Hz AC), the Netherlands, New Zealand (Wellington), Singapore (on the North East MRT line), the United States (Chicago area on the Metra Electric District and South Shore Line interurban line, and Link light rail in Seattle, Washington). In Slovakia, there are two narrow-gauge lines in the High Tatras (one a cog railway). In the Netherlands it is used on the main system, alongside 25 kV on the HSL-Zuid and Betuwelijn, and 3,000 V south of Maastricht. In Portugal, it is used in the Cascais Line and in Denmark on the suburban S-train system (1650 V DC).

In the United Kingdom, 1,500 V DC was used in 1954 for the Woodhead trans-Pennine route (now closed); the system used regenerative braking, allowing for transfer of energy between climbing and descending trains on the steep approaches to the tunnel. The system was also used for suburban electrification in East London and Manchester, now converted to 25 kV AC. It is now only used for the Tyne and Wear Metro. In India, 1,500 V DC was the first electrification system launched in 1925 in Mumbai area. Between 2012 and 2016, the electrification was converted to 25 kV 50 Hz, which is the countrywide system.

3 kV DC is used in Belgium, Italy, Spain, Poland, Slovakia, Slovenia, South Africa, Chile, northern Czechia (being phased out), the former republics of the Soviet Union, and in the Netherlands on a few kilometres between Maastricht and Belgium. It was formerly used by the Milwaukee Road from Harlowton, Montana, to Seattle, across the Continental Divide and including extensive branch and loop lines in Montana, and by the Delaware, Lackawanna and Western Railroad (now New Jersey Transit, converted to 25 kV AC) in the United States, and the Kolkata suburban railway (Bardhaman Main Line) in India, before it was converted to 25 kV 50 Hz.

DC voltages between 600 V and 750 V are used by most tramways and trolleybus networks, as well as some metro systems as the traction motors accept this voltage without the weight of an on-board transformer.

==== Medium-voltage DC ====
Increasing availability of high-voltage semiconductors may allow the use of higher and more efficient DC voltages that heretofore have only been practical with AC. The use of medium-voltage DC electrification (MVDC) would solve some of the issues associated with standard-frequency AC electrification systems, especially possible supply grid load imbalance and the phase separation between the electrified sections powered from different phases, whereas high voltage would make the transmission more efficient.

In the 1960s the Soviets experimented with boosting the overhead voltage from 3 to 6 kV. DC rolling stock was equipped with ignitron-based converters to lower the supply voltage to 3 kV. The converters turned out to be unreliable and the experiment was curtailed. In 1970 the Ural Electromechanical Institute of Railway Engineers carried out calculations for railway electrification at 12 kV DC, showing that the equivalent loss levels for a 25 kV AC system could be achieved with DC voltage between 11 and 16 kV. In the 1980s and 1990s 12 kV DC was being tested on the October Railway near Leningrad (now Petersburg). The experiments ended in 1995 due to the end of funding.

In the 21st century, UIC conducted a case study for the conversion of the Bordeaux-Hendaye railway line (France), currently electrified at 1.5 kV DC, to 9 kV DC and found that the conversion would allow the use of less bulky overhead wires (saving €20 million per 100 route-km) and lower the losses (saving 2 GW·h per year per 100 route-km; equaling about €150,000 per year). The line chosen is one of the lines, totaling 6000 km, that are in need of renewal. More recently, the University of Birmingham considered the use of 25 kV (i.e. a voltage already used by most AC railways) to make the most use of existing equipment and supply chains.

=== Third rail ===
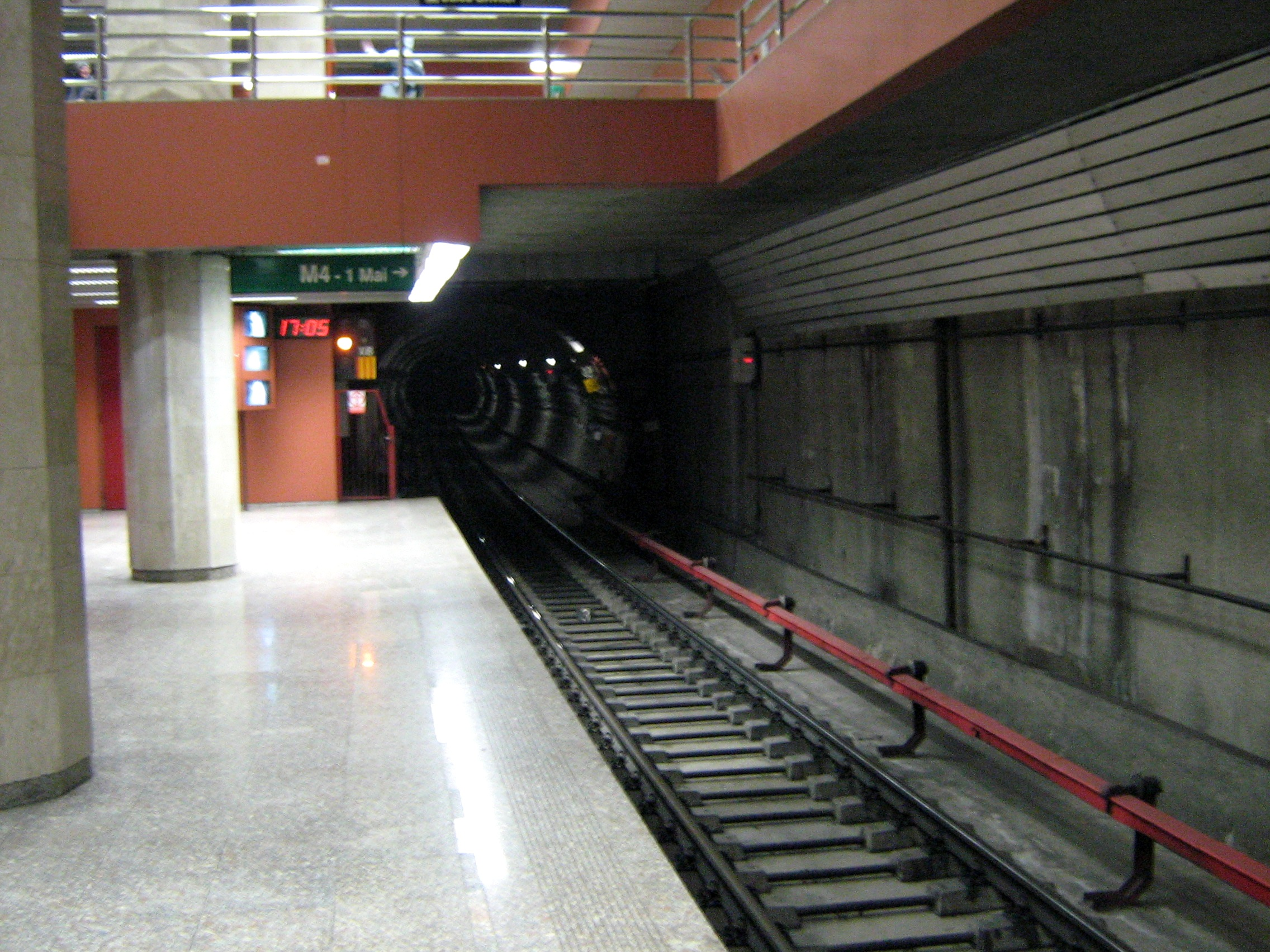
A bottom-contact third rail electrification system on the Bucharest Metro, Romania

Most electrification systems use overhead wires, but third rail is an option up to 1,500 V. Third rail systems almost exclusively use DC distribution. The use of AC is usually not feasible due to the dimensions of a third rail being physically very large compared with the skin depth that AC penetrates to 0.3 millimetres or 0.012 inches in a steel rail. This effect makes the resistance per unit length unacceptably high compared with the use of DC.

=== Fourth rail ===
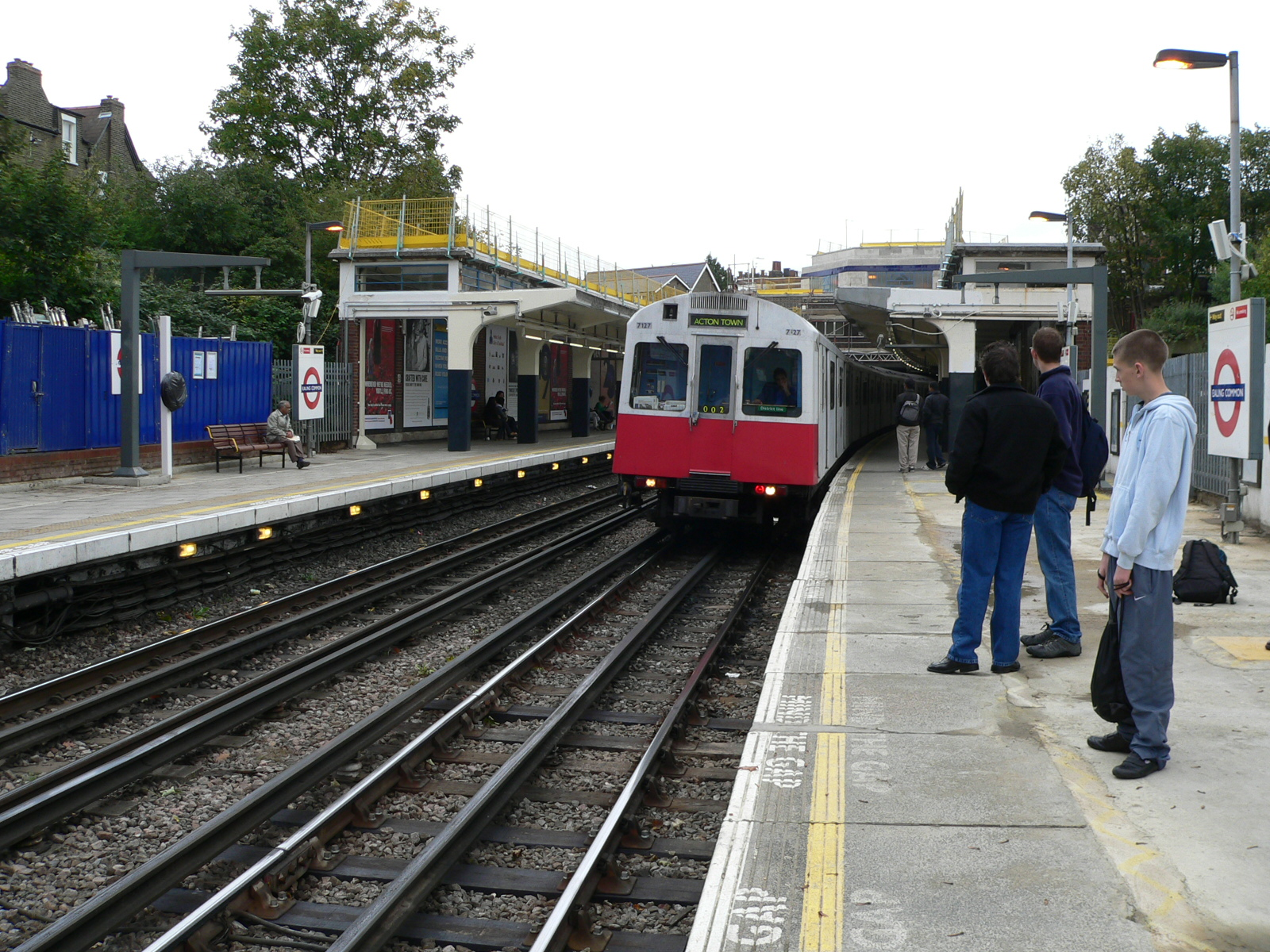
The London Underground uses third and fourth rails beside and between the running rails for electrification.

In four-rail systems, the additional rail carries the electrical return that, on third-rail and overhead networks, is provided by the running rails. On the London Underground, a top-contact third rail is beside the track, energized at +420 V DC, and a top-contact fourth rail is located centrally between the running rails at −210 V DC, which combine to provide a traction voltage of 630 V DC. The same system was used for Milan's earliest underground line, Milan Metro's line 1, whose more recent lines use an overhead catenary or a third rail.

The key advantage of the four-rail system is that neither running rail carries any current. This scheme was introduced because of the problems of return currents, intended to be carried by the earthed (grounded) running rail, flowing through the iron tunnel linings instead. This can cause electrolytic damage and even arcing if the tunnel segments are not electrically bonded together. The problem was exacerbated because the return current also had a tendency to flow through nearby iron pipes forming the water and gas mains. Some of these, particularly Victorian mains that predated London's underground railways, were not constructed to carry currents and had no adequate electrical bonding between pipe segments. The four-rail system solves the problem. Although the supply has an artificially created earth point, this connection is derived by using resistors which ensures that stray earth currents are kept to manageable levels. Power-only rails can be mounted on strongly insulating ceramic chairs to minimise current leak, but this is not possible for running rails, which have to be seated on stronger metal chairs to carry the weight of trains. However, elastomeric rubber pads placed between the rails and chairs can now solve part of the problem by insulating the running rails from the current return should there be a leakage through the running rails.

The Expo and Millennium Line of the Vancouver SkyTrain use side-contact fourth-rail systems for their 650 V DC supply. Both are located to the side of the train, as the space between the running rails is occupied by an aluminum plate, as part of stator of the linear induction propulsion system used on the Innovia ART system. While part of the SkyTrain network, the Canada Line does not use this system and instead uses more traditional motors attached to the wheels and third-rail electrification.

==== Rubber-tyred systems ====
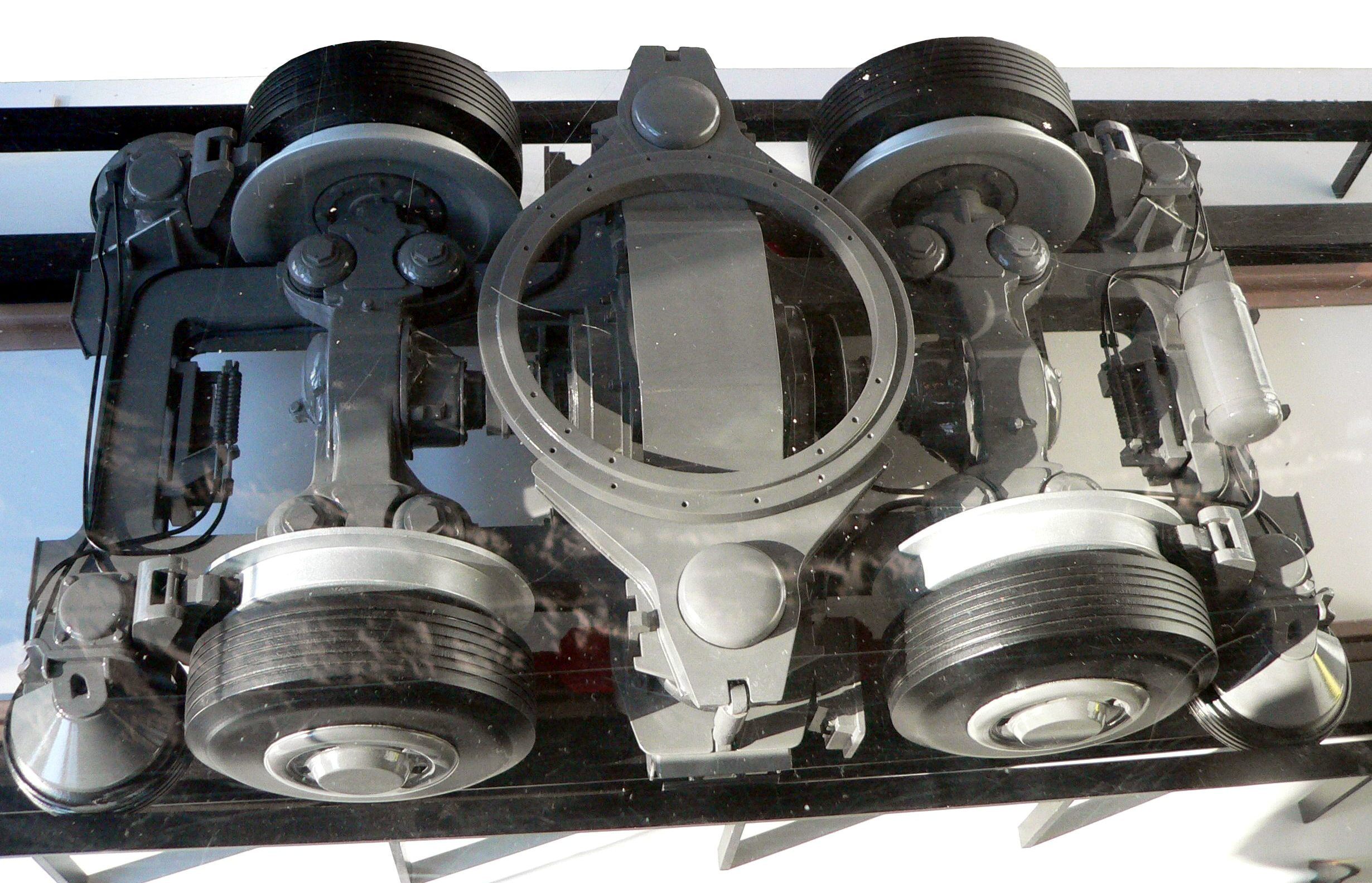
Bogie from an MP 89 Paris Métro vehicle. The lateral contact shoe is located between the rubber tyres.

A few lines of the Paris Métro in France operate on a four-rail power system. The trains move on rubber tyres which roll on a pair of narrow roll ways made of steel and, in some places, of concrete. Since the tyres do not conduct the return current, the two guide bars provided outside the running 'roll ways' become, in a sense, a third and fourth rail which each provide 750 V DC, so at least electrically it is a four-rail system. Each wheel set of a powered bogie carries one traction motor. A side sliding (side running) contact shoe picks up the current from the vertical face of each guide bar. The return of each traction motor, as well as each wagon, is affected by one contact shoe each that slide on top of each one of the running rails. This and all other rubber-tyred metros that have a 1,435 mm (4 ft 8 1/2 in) standard gauge track between the roll ways operate in the same manner.

== Alternating current ==
Railways and electrical utilities use AC as opposed to DC for the same reason: to use transformers, which require AC, to produce higher voltages. The higher the voltage, the lower the current for the same power (because power is current multiplied by voltage), and power loss is proportional to the current squared. The lower current reduces line loss, thus allowing higher power to be delivered.

As alternating current is used with high voltages, inside the locomotive, a transformer steps the voltage down for use by the traction motors and auxiliary loads.

An early advantage of AC is that the power-wasting resistors used in DC locomotives for speed control were not needed in an AC locomotive: multiple taps on the transformer can supply a range of voltages. Separate low-voltage transformer windings supply lighting and the motors driving auxiliary machinery. More recently, the development of very high-power semiconductors has caused the classic DC motor to be largely replaced with the three-phase induction motor fed by a variable frequency drive, a special inverter that varies both frequency and voltage to control motor speed. These drives can run equally well on DC or AC of any frequency, and many modern electric locomotives are designed to handle different supply voltages and frequencies to simplify cross-border operation.

=== Low-frequency alternating current ===
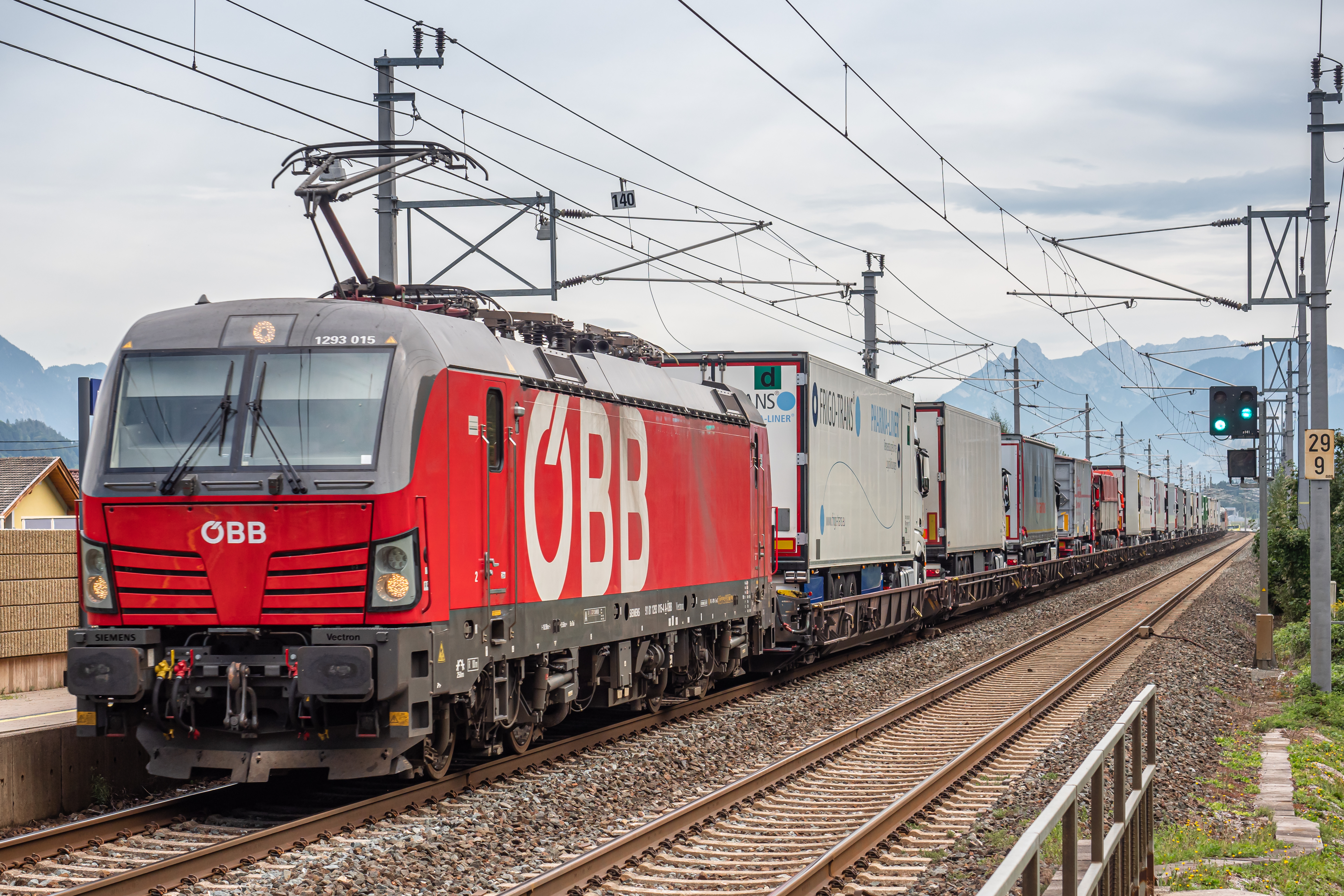
An ÖBB train using 15 kV 16.7 Hz AC overhead lines in Austria

Five European countries – Germany, Austria, Switzerland, Norway, and Sweden – have standardized on 15 kV 16 2/3 Hz (the 50 Hz mains frequency divided by three) single-phase AC. On 16 October 1995, Germany, Austria, and Switzerland changed from 16 2/3 Hz to 16.7 Hz which is no longer exactly one-third of the grid frequency. This solved overheating problems with the rotary converters used to generate some of this power from the grid supply.

In the US, the New York, New Haven, and Hartford Railroad, the Pennsylvania Railroad and the Philadelphia and Reading Railway adopted 11 kV 25 Hz single-phase AC. Parts of the original electrified network still operate at 25 Hz, with voltage boosted to 12 kV, while others were converted to 12.5 or 25 kV 60 Hz.

In the UK, the London, Brighton and South Coast Railway pioneered overhead electrification of its suburban lines in London, London Bridge to Victoria being opened to traffic on 1 December 1909. Victoria to Crystal Palace via Balham and West Norwood opened in May 1911. Peckham Rye to West Norwood opened in June 1912. Further extensions were not made owing to the First World War. Two lines opened in 1925 under the Southern Railway serving Coulsdon North and Sutton railway station. The lines were electrified at 6.7 kV 25 Hz. It was announced in 1926 that all lines were to be converted to DC third rail and the last overhead-powered electric service ran in September 1929.

=== Standard frequency alternating current ===
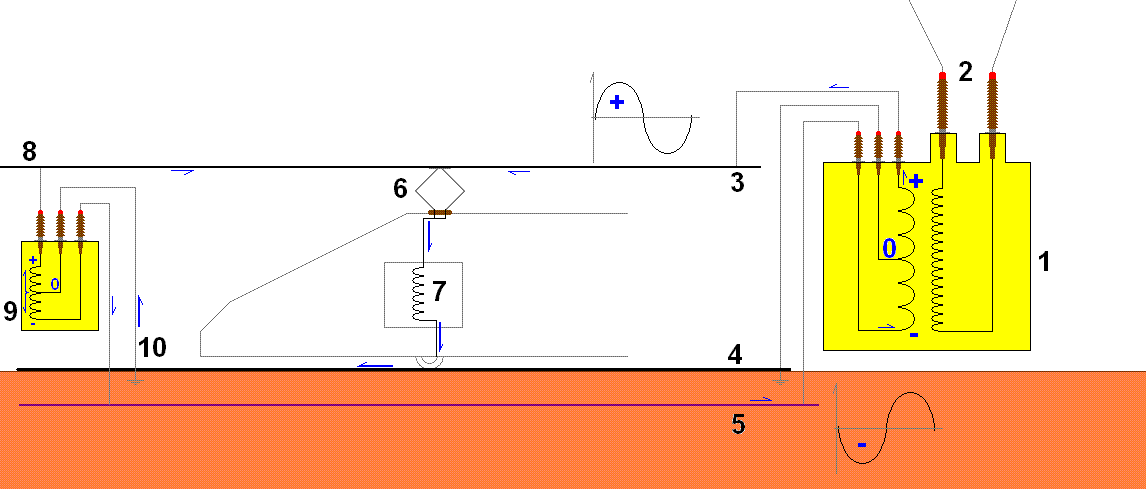
Schema of 2×25 kV power supply: 1. Supply transformer (center-tapped output); 2. Power supply; 3. Overhead line; 4. Running rail; 5. Feeder line; 6. Pantograph; 7. Locomotive transformer; 8. Overhead line; 9. Autotransformer; 10. Running rail

AC power is used at 60 Hz in North America (excluding the aforementioned 25 Hz network), Saudi Arabia, western Japan, South Korea, and Taiwan; and at 50 Hz in a number of European countries, India, eastern Japan, Russia and Eastern Europe, on high-speed lines in much of Western and Central Europe (including countries that still run conventional railways under DC but not in countries using 16.7 Hz, see above). Most systems like this operate at 25 kV, although 12.5 kV sections exist in the United States, and 20 kV is used on some lines in Japan. On "French system" HSLs, the overhead line and a "sleeper" feeder line each carry 25 kV in relation to the rails, but in opposite phase so they are at 50 kV from each other; autotransformers equalize the tension at regular intervals.

=== Three-phase alternating current ===
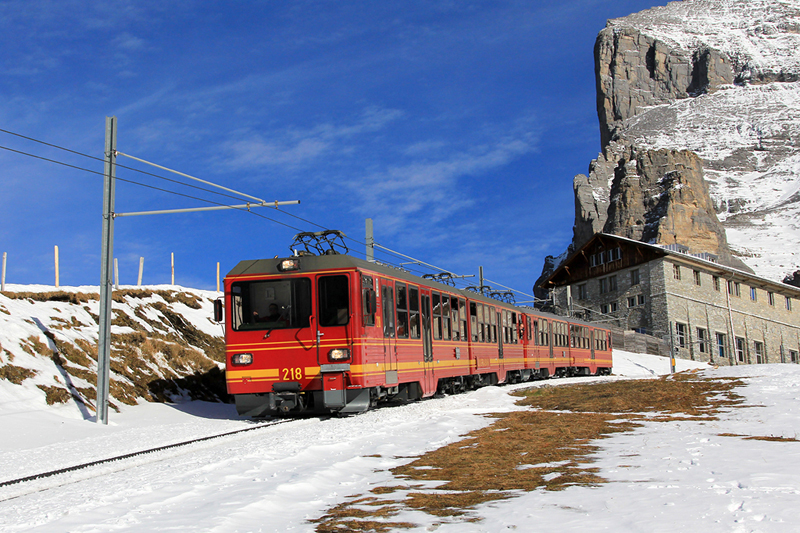
The Jungfrau Railway, the highest in Europe, uses three-phase electric power between two overhead lines and the rails.

Various railway electrification systems in the late nineteenth and twentieth centuries utilised three-phase, rather than single-phase electric power delivery due to ease of design of both power supply and locomotives. These systems could either use standard network frequency and three power cables, or reduced frequency, which allowed for the return-phase line to be the third rail, rather than an additional overhead wire.

== Comparisons ==
=== AC versus DC for mainlines ===
The majority of modern electrification systems take AC energy from a power grid that is delivered to a locomotive, and within the locomotive, transformed and rectified to a lower DC voltage in preparation for use by traction motors. These motors may either be DC motors which directly use the DC or they may be three-phase AC motors which require further conversion of the DC to variable frequency three-phase AC (using power electronics). Thus, both systems are faced with the same task: converting and transporting high-voltage AC from the power grid to low-voltage DC in the locomotive. The difference between AC and DC electrification systems lies in where the AC is converted to DC: at the substation or on the train. Energy efficiency and infrastructure costs determine which of these is used on a network, although this is often fixed due to pre-existing electrification systems.

Both the transmission and conversion of electric energy involve losses: ohmic losses in wires and power electronics, magnetic field losses in transformers and smoothing reactors (inductors). Power conversion for a DC system takes place mainly in a railway substation where large, heavy, and more efficient hardware can be used as compared to an AC system where conversion takes place aboard the locomotive where space is limited and losses are significantly higher. However, the higher voltages used in many AC electrification systems reduce transmission losses over longer distances, allowing for fewer substations or more powerful locomotives to be used. Also, the energy used to blow air to cool transformers, power electronics (including rectifiers), and other conversion hardware must be accounted for.

Standard AC electrification systems use much higher voltages than standard DC systems. One of the advantages of raising the voltage is that, to transmit certain level of power, lower current is necessary (P = V × I). Lowering the current reduces the ohmic losses and allows for less bulky, lighter overhead line equipment and more spacing between traction substations, while maintaining power capacity of the system. On the other hand, the higher voltage requires larger isolation gaps, requiring some elements of infrastructure to be larger. The standard-frequency AC system may introduce imbalance to the supply grid, requiring careful planning and design (as at each substation power is drawn from two out of three phases). The low-frequency AC system may be powered by separate generation and distribution network or a network of converter substations, adding the expense, also low-frequency transformers, used both at the substations and on the rolling stock, are particularly bulky and heavy. The DC system, apart from being limited as to the maximum power that can be transmitted, also can be responsible for electrochemical corrosion due to stray DC currents.

=== Electric versus diesel ===
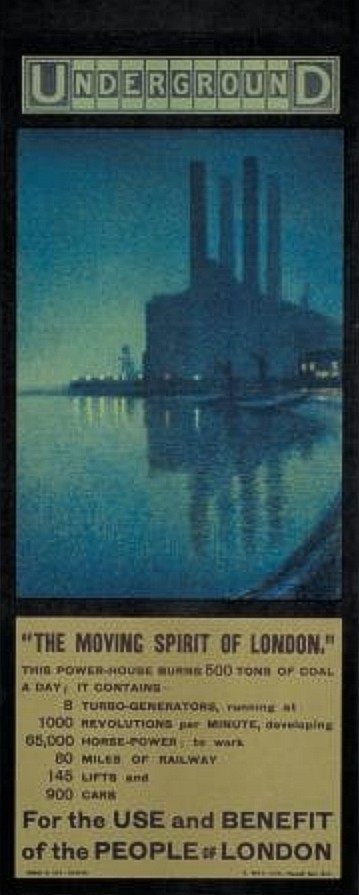
Lots Road Power Station in a poster from 1910. This private power station, used by London Underground, gave London trains and trams a power supply independent from the main power network.

==== Energy efficiency ====
Electric trains need not carry the weight of prime movers, transmission and fuel. This is partly offset by the weight of electrical equipment. Regenerative braking returns power to the electrification system so that it may be used elsewhere, by other trains on the same system or returned to the general power grid. This is especially useful in mountainous areas where heavily loaded trains must descend long grades.

Central station electricity can often be generated with higher efficiency than a mobile engine/generator. While the efficiency of power plant generation and diesel locomotive generation are roughly the same in the nominal regime, diesel motors decrease in efficiency in non-nominal regimes at low power while if an electric power plant needs to generate less power it will shut down its least efficient generators, thereby increasing efficiency. The electric train can save energy (as compared to diesel) by regenerative braking and by not needing to consume energy by idling as diesel locomotives do when stopped or coasting. However, electric rolling stock may run cooling blowers when stopped or coasting, thus consuming energy.

Large fossil fuel power stations operate at high efficiency, and can be used for district heating or to produce district cooling, leading to a higher total efficiency. Electricity for electric rail systems can also come from renewable energy, nuclear power, or other low-carbon sources, which do not emit pollution or emissions.

==== Power output ====
Electric locomotives may easily be constructed with greater power output than most diesel locomotives. For passenger operation it is possible to provide enough power with diesel engines (see e.g. 'ICE TD') but, at higher speeds, this proves costly and impractical. Therefore, almost all high speed trains are electric. The high power of electric locomotives also gives them the ability to pull freight at higher speed over gradients; in mixed traffic conditions this increases capacity when the time between trains can be decreased. The higher power of electric locomotives and an electrification can also be a cheaper alternative to a new and less steep railway if train weights are to be increased on a system.

On the other hand, electrification may not be suitable for lines with low frequency of traffic, because lower running cost of trains may be outweighed by the high cost of the electrification infrastructure. Therefore, most long-distance lines in developing or sparsely populated countries are not electrified due to relatively low frequency of trains.

==== Network effect ====
Network effects are a large factor with electrification. When converting lines to electric, the connections with other lines must be considered. Some electrifications have subsequently been removed because of the through traffic to non-electrified lines. If through traffic is to have any benefit, time-consuming engine switches must occur to make such connections or expensive dual mode engines must be used. This is mostly an issue for long-distance trips, but many lines come to be dominated by through traffic from long-haul freight trains (usually running coal, ore, or containers to or from ports). In theory, these trains could enjoy dramatic savings through electrification, but it can be too costly to extend electrification to isolated areas, and unless an entire network is electrified, companies often find that they need to continue use of diesel trains even if sections are electrified. The increasing demand for container traffic, which is more efficient when utilizing the double-stack car, also has network effect issues with existing electrifications due to insufficient clearance of overhead electrical lines for these trains, but electrification can be built or modified to have sufficient clearance, at additional cost.

A problem specifically related to electrified lines are gaps in the electrification. Electric vehicles, especially locomotives, lose power when traversing gaps in the supply, such as phase change gaps in overhead systems, and gaps over points in third rail systems. These become a nuisance if the locomotive stops with its collector on a dead gap, in which case there is no power to restart. This is less of a problem in trains consisting of two or more multiple units coupled together, since in that case, if the train stops with one collector in a dead gap, another multiple unit can push or pull the disconnected unit until it can again draw power. The same applies to the kind of push-pull trains which have a locomotive at each end. Power gaps can be overcome in single-collector trains by on-board batteries or motor-flywheel-generator systems. In 2014, progress is being made in the use of large capacitors to power electric vehicles between stations, and so avoid the need for overhead wires between those stations.

==== Maintenance costs ====
Maintenance costs of the lines may be increased by electrification, but many systems claim lower costs due to reduced wear-and-tear on the track from lighter rolling stock. There are some additional maintenance costs associated with the electrical equipment around the track, such as power sub-stations and the catenary wire itself, but, if there is sufficient traffic, the reduced track and especially the lower engine maintenance and running costs exceed the costs of this maintenance significantly.

==== Sparks effect ====
Newly electrified lines often show a "sparks effect", whereby electrification in passenger rail systems leads to significant jumps in patronage / revenue. The reasons may include electric trains being seen as more modern and attractive to ride, faster, quieter and smoother service, and the fact that electrification often goes hand in hand with a general infrastructure and rolling stock overhaul / replacement, which leads to better service quality (in a way that theoretically could also be achieved by doing similar upgrades yet without electrification). Whatever the causes of the sparks effect, it is well established for numerous routes that have been electrified over decades. This also applies when bus routes with diesel buses are replaced by trolleybuses. The overhead wires make the service "visible" even if no bus is running and the existence of the infrastructure gives some long-term expectations of the line being in operation.

==== Double-stack rail transport ====
Due to the height restriction imposed by the overhead wires, double-stacked container trains have been traditionally difficult and rare to operate under electrified lines. However, this limitation is being overcome by railways in India, China, and African countries by laying new tracks with increased catenary height.

Such installations are in the Western Dedicated Freight Corridor in India where the wire height is at 7.45 m (24 ft 5 in) to accommodate double-stack container trains without the need of well-wagons.

==== Advantages ====
There are a number of advantages including the fact there is no exposure of passengers to exhaust from the locomotive and lower cost of building, running and maintaining locomotives and multiple units. Electric trains have a higher power-to-weight ratio (no onboard fuel tanks), resulting in fewer locomotives, faster acceleration, higher practical limit of power, higher limit of speed, less noise pollution (quieter operation). The faster acceleration clears lines more quickly to run more trains on the track in urban rail uses.

- Reduced power loss at higher altitudes (for power loss see Diesel engine)
- Independence of running costs from fluctuating fuel prices
- Service to underground stations where diesel trains cannot operate for safety reasons
- Reduced environmental pollution, especially in highly populated urban areas, even if electricity is produced by fossil fuels
- Easily accommodates kinetic energy brake reclaim using supercapacitors
- More comfortable ride on multiple units as trains have no underfloor diesel engines
- Somewhat higher energy efficiency in part due to regenerative braking and less power lost when "idling"
- More flexible primary energy source: can use coal, natural gas, nuclear or renewable energy (hydro, solar, wind) as the primary energy source instead of diesel fuel
- If the entire network is electrified, diesel infrastructure such as fueling stations, maintenance yards and indeed the diesel locomotive fleet can be retired or put to other uses – this is often the business case in favor of electrifying the last few lines in a network where otherwise costs would be too high. Having only one type of motive power also allows greater fleet homogeneity which can also reduce costs.

==== Disadvantages ====
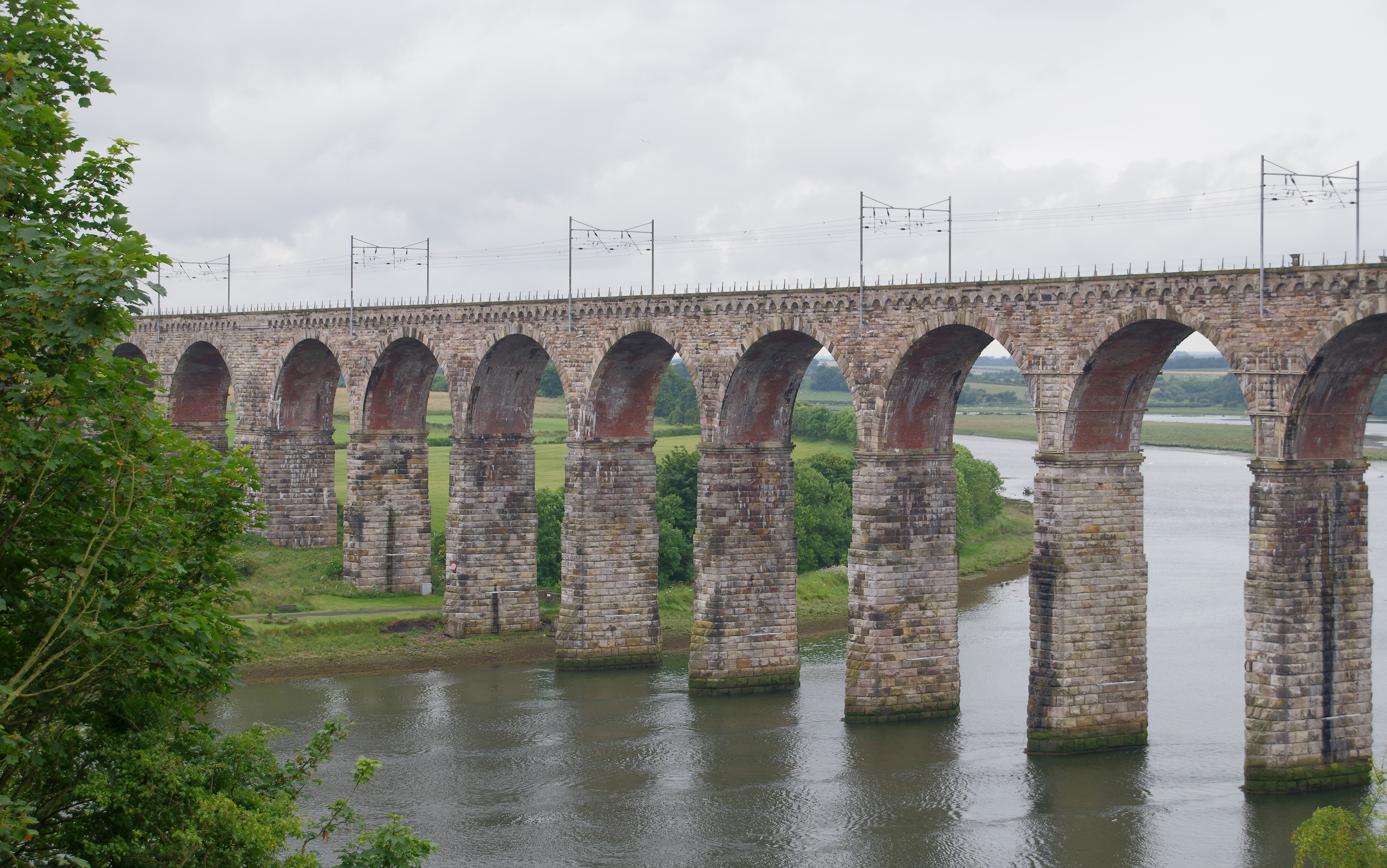
The Royal Border Bridge in England, a protected monument. Adding electric catenary to older structures may be an expensive cost of electrification projects.

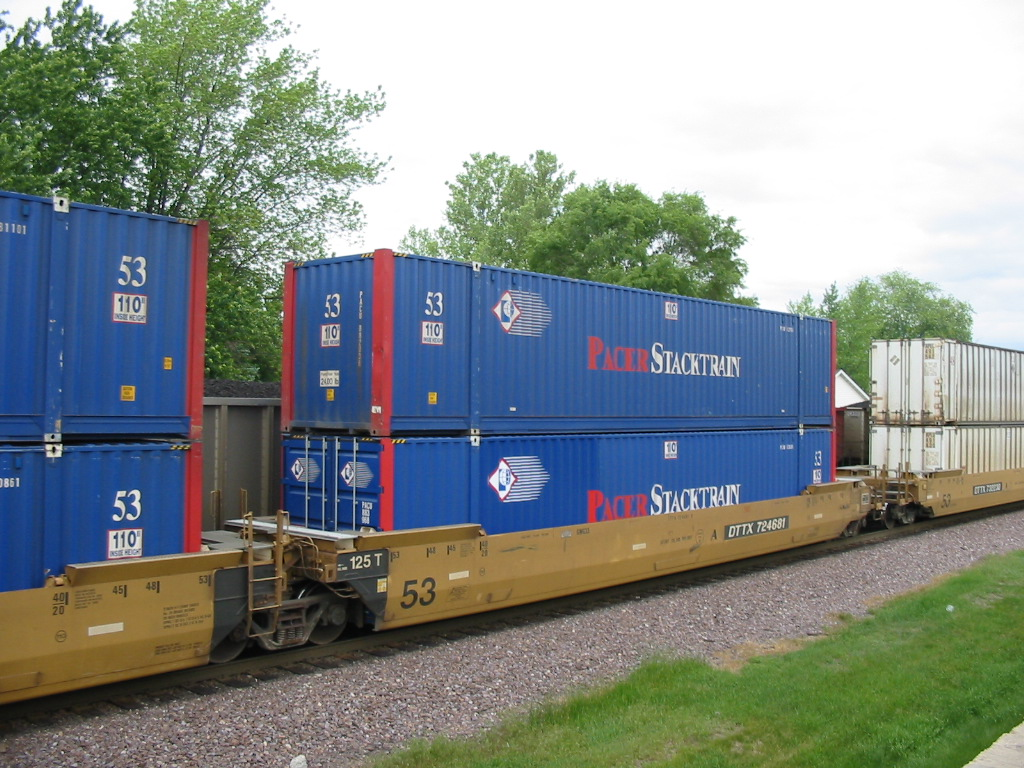
Many electrification systems using overhead lines do not allow sufficient clearance for a double-stack car. Each container may be 9 ft 6 1/2 in (2.908 m) tall and the bottom of the well is 1 ft 2 in (0.36 m) above rail, making the overall height 20 ft 3 in (6.17 m) including the well car.

- Electrification cost: electrification requires an entire new infrastructure to be built around the existing tracks at a significant cost. Costs are especially high when tunnels, bridges and other obstructions have to be altered for clearance. Another aspect that can raise the cost of electrification are the alterations or upgrades to railway signalling needed for new traffic characteristics, and to protect signalling circuitry and track circuits from interference by traction current. Electrification typically requires line closures while new equipment is being installed.
- Appearance: the overhead line structures and cabling can have a significant landscape impact compared with a non-electrified or third rail electrified line that has only occasional signalling equipment above ground level.
- Fragility and vulnerability: overhead electrification systems can suffer severe disruption due to minor mechanical faults or the effects of high winds causing the pantograph of a moving train to become entangled with the catenary, ripping the wires from their supports. The damage is often not limited to the supply to one track, but extends to those for adjacent tracks as well, causing the entire route to be blocked for a considerable time. Third-rail systems can suffer disruption in cold weather due to ice forming on the conductor rail.
- Theft: the high scrap value of copper and the unguarded, remote installations make overhead cables an attractive target for scrap metal thieves. Attempts at theft of live 25 kV cables may end in the thief's death from electrocution. In the UK, cable theft is claimed to be one of the biggest sources of delay and disruption to train services – though this normally relates to signalling cable, which is equally problematic for diesel lines.
- Incompatibility: Diesel trains can run on any track without electricity or with any kind of electricity (third rail or overhead line, DC or AC, and at any voltage or frequency). Not so for electric trains, which can never run on non-electrified lines, and which even on electrified lines can run only on the single, or the few, electrical system(s) for which they are equipped. Even on fully electrified networks, it is usually a good idea to keep a few diesel locomotives for maintenance and repair trains, for instance to repair broken or stolen overhead lines, or to lay new tracks. However, due to ventilation issues, diesel trains may have to be banned from certain tunnels and underground train stations mitigating the advantage of diesel trains somewhat.
- Birds may perch on parts with different charges, and animals may also touch the electrification system. Dead animals attract foxes or other scavengers, bringing risk of collision with trains.
- In most of the world's railway networks, the height clearance of overhead electrical lines is not sufficient for a double-stack container car or other unusually tall loads. To upgrade electrified lines to the correct clearances (21 ft 8 in or 6.60 m) to take double-stacked container trains, besides renewing bridges over it, would normally mean need for special pantographs violating standardisation and requiring custom made vehicles.

== Railway electrification around the world ==
As of 2012, electrified tracks accounted for nearly one third of total tracks globally. As of 2018, there were 72,110 km (44,810 mi) of railways electrified at 25 kV, either 50 or 60 Hz; 68,890 km (42,810 mi) electrified at 3 kV DC; 32,940 km (20,470 mi) electrified at 15 kV 16.7 or 16 2/3 Hz and 20,440 km (12,700 mi) electrified at 1.5 kV DC.

As of 2023, the Swiss rail network is the largest fully electrified network in the world and one of only eleven countries or territories to achieve this, as listed in List of countries by rail transport network size. The percentage then continues falling in order with Laos, Montenegro, Belgium, Georgia, South Korea, Netherlands, and Japan, with all others being less than 75% electrified.

Overall, China takes first place, with around 100,000 km (62,000 mi) of electrified railway, followed by India with over 62,253 km (38,682 mi) of electrified railway, and continuing with Russia, with over 54,000 km (34,000 mi) of electrified railway. A number of countries have zero electrified railways, instead relying on diesel multiple units, locomotive hauled services or other forms of locomotion. The European Union contains the longest amount of electrified railways, with over 114,000 km (71,000 mi) of electrified railway; however this only makes up around 55% of the total railway length.

Several countries have announced plans to electrify all or most of their railway network, including Indian Railways and Israel Railways. The Trans-Siberian Railway, mainly in Russia, is completely electrified, making it one of the longest stretches of electrified railways in the world.

Countries or regions with 100% or near-total railway electrification
Country / Territory	Length total	Length electrified	% electrified	Data year
Switzerland	5,443 km (3,382 mi)	5,443 km (3,382 mi)	100%	2020
Armenia	725.6 km (450.9 mi)	725.6 km (450.9 mi)	100%	2022
Hong Kong	271 km (168 mi)	271 km (168 mi)	100%	2023
Qatar	92.5 km (57.5 mi)	92.5 km (57.5 mi)	100%	2025 (Note: Doha Metro (76km) + Lusail Tram (16.5km))
Mauritius	30 km (19 mi)	30 km (19 mi)	100%	2024
Puerto Rico	17 km (11 mi)	17 km (11 mi)	100%	2006
Macau	16.3 km (10.1 mi)	16.3 km (10.1 mi)	100%	2024 (Note: Macau Light Rapid Transit)
Liechtenstein	9.5 km (5.9 mi)	9.5 km (5.9 mi)	100%	2024
Monaco	1.7 km (1.1 mi)	1.7 km (1.1 mi)	100%	2024
India	70,428 km (43,762 mi)	70,292 km (43,677 mi)	99.81%	2026
Singapore	281 km (175 mi)	280 km (174 mi)	99.6%	2024 (Note: MRT (242.5 km), LRT (28.8 km), Changi Airport Skytrain (6.4 km), and Sentosa Express (2.1 km) are electrified; the portion of the KTM West Coast Line in Singapore (approximately 1 km?) is not.)
Laos	424 km (263 mi)	414 km (257 mi)	97.6%	2024
Luxembourg	271 km (168 mi)	262 km (163 mi)	96.7%	2021
Montenegro	250 km (155 mi)	225 km (140 mi)	90%	2017

== See also ==
- Battery electric multiple unit
- Battery locomotive
- Conduit current collection
- Current collector
- Dual electrification
- Electromote
- Fifth rail system
- Ground-level power supply
- History of the electric locomotive
- Initial Electrification Experiments NY NH HR
- List of railway electrification systems
- List of tram systems by gauge and electrification
- Multi-system (rail)
- Overhead conductor rails
- Railroad electrification in the United States
- Stud contact system
- Traction current pylon
- Traction powerstation
- Traction substation

== Sources ==
=== English ===
- Moody, G T (1960). "Part One". Southern Electric (3rd ed.). London: Ian Allan Ltd.
- Gomez-Exposito A., Mauricio J.M., Maza-Ortega J.M. "VSC-based MVDC Railway Electrification System" IEEE transactions on power delivery, v. 29, no. 1, Feb. 2014 pp. 422–431. (suggests 24 kV DC)
- (Jane's) Urban Transit Systems
- Hammond, John Winthrop (2011) [1941]. Men and volts; the story of General Electric. Philadelphia, Pennsylvania; London: General Electric Company; J. B. Lippincott & Co.; Literary Licensing, LLC. ISBN 978-1-258-03284-5 – via Internet Archive. "He was to produce the first motor that operated without gears of any sort, having its armature direct-connected to the car axle."
- Martin, T. Commerford (1924). Kaempffert, Waldemar Bernhard (ed.). A Popular History of American Invention. Vol. 1. London; New York: Charles Scribner's Sons – via Internet Archive.
- Malone, Dumas (1928). Sidney Howe Short. Vol. 17. London; New York: Charles Scribner's Sons.

=== Russian ===
- Винокуров В.А., Попов Д.А. "Электрические машины железно-дорожного транспорта" (Electrical machinery of railroad transportation), Москва, Транспорт, 1986. ISBN 5-88998-425-X, 520 pp.
- Дмитриев, В.А., "Народнохозяйственная эффективность электрификации железных дорог и применения тепловозной тяги" (National economic effectiveness of railway electrification and application of diesel traction), Москва, Транспорт 1976.
- Дробинский В.А., Егунов П.М. "Как устроен и работает тепловоз" (How the diesel locomotive works) 3rd ed. Moscow, Транспорт, 1980.
- Иванова В.Н. (ed.) "Конструкция и динамика тепловозов" (Construction and dynamics of the diesel locomotive). Москва, Транспорт, 1968 (textbook).
- Калинин, В.К. "Электровозы и электропоезда" (Electric locomotives and electric train sets) Москва, Транспорт, 1991 ISBN 978-5-277-01046-4
- Мирошниченко, Р.И., "Режимы работы электрифицированных участков" (Regimes of operation of electrified sections [of railways]), Москва, Транспорт, 1982.
- Перцовский, Л. М.; "Энергетическая эффективность электрической тяги" (Energy efficiency of electric traction), Железнодорожный транспорт (magazine), #12, 1974 p. 39+
- Плакс, А.В. & Пупынин, В. Н., "Электрические железные дороги" (Electric Railways), Москва "Транспорт" 1993.
- Сидоров Н.И., Сидорожа Н.Н. "Как устроен и работает электровоз" (How the electric locomotive works) Москва, Транспорт, 1988 (5th ed.). 233 pp, ISBN 978-5-277-00191-2. 1980 (4th ed.).
- Хомич А.З. Тупицын О.И., Симсон А.Э. "Экономия топлива и теплотехническая модернизация тепловозов" (Fuel economy and the thermodynamic modernization of diesel locomotives). Москва: Транспорт, 1975. 264 pp.
