= Hathidah Junction railway station =

Railway station in Patna, Bihar, India

HATHIDAH JUNCTION

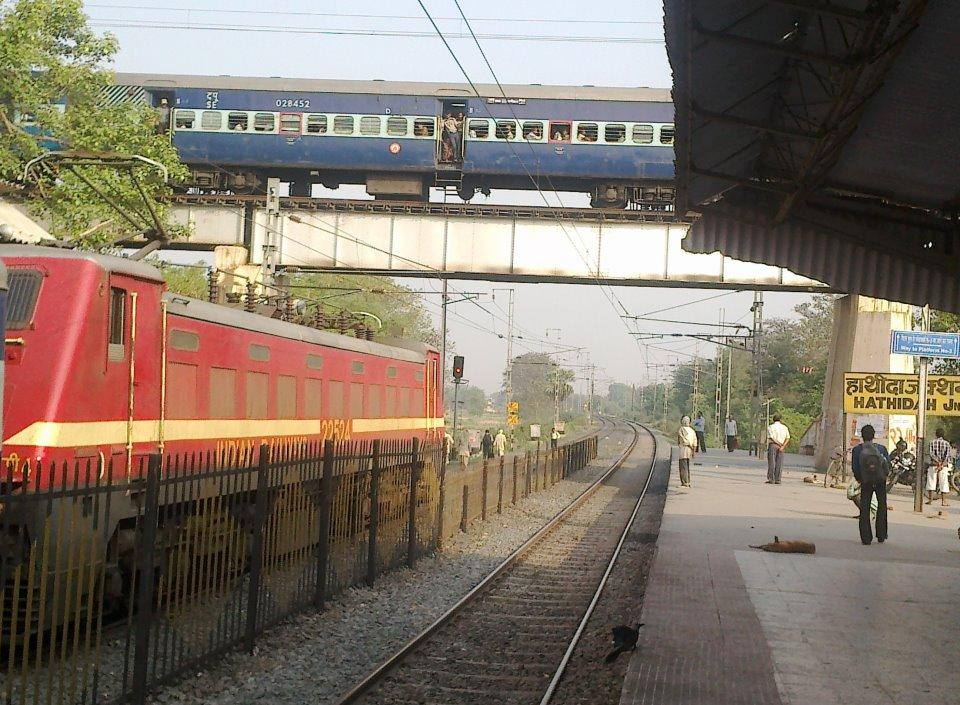
- Hathidah Junction Railway Station

General information
- Other names: Hathida Junction, Hatida Junction
- Location: Barauni Road, Mokama, Patna district, Bihar; India
- Coordinates: 25°21′57″N 85°59′15″E
- Elevation: 50 metres (160 ft)
- System: Double Electric-Line | Indian Railways station
- Lines: Howrah–New Delhi main line, Barauni - Mokama Section, Luckeesarai—Barauni Section
- Platforms: 3
- Connections: Barauni

Construction
- Structure type: Standard (on-ground station)

Other information
- Status: Functioning
- Station code: HTZ
- Zone(s): East Central Railway
- Division(s): Danapur

History
- Electrified: 1994
- Former names: Great Indian Peninsula Railway
Route map
- Source: Indian Railways Time Table, Eastern Zone
Location
- Location within Bihar Location within India
- Interactive map

Hathidah Junction railway station (station code: HTZ), is a railway station located within the East Central Railway Zone in Mokama, Patna district, of the indian state of Bihar. The station track type is a Double Electric-Line. The station located on Howrah–New Delhi main line. The trains stop who is coming from Delhi, Howrah and Barauni route. The station have link with Barauni route line by Rajendra Setu.

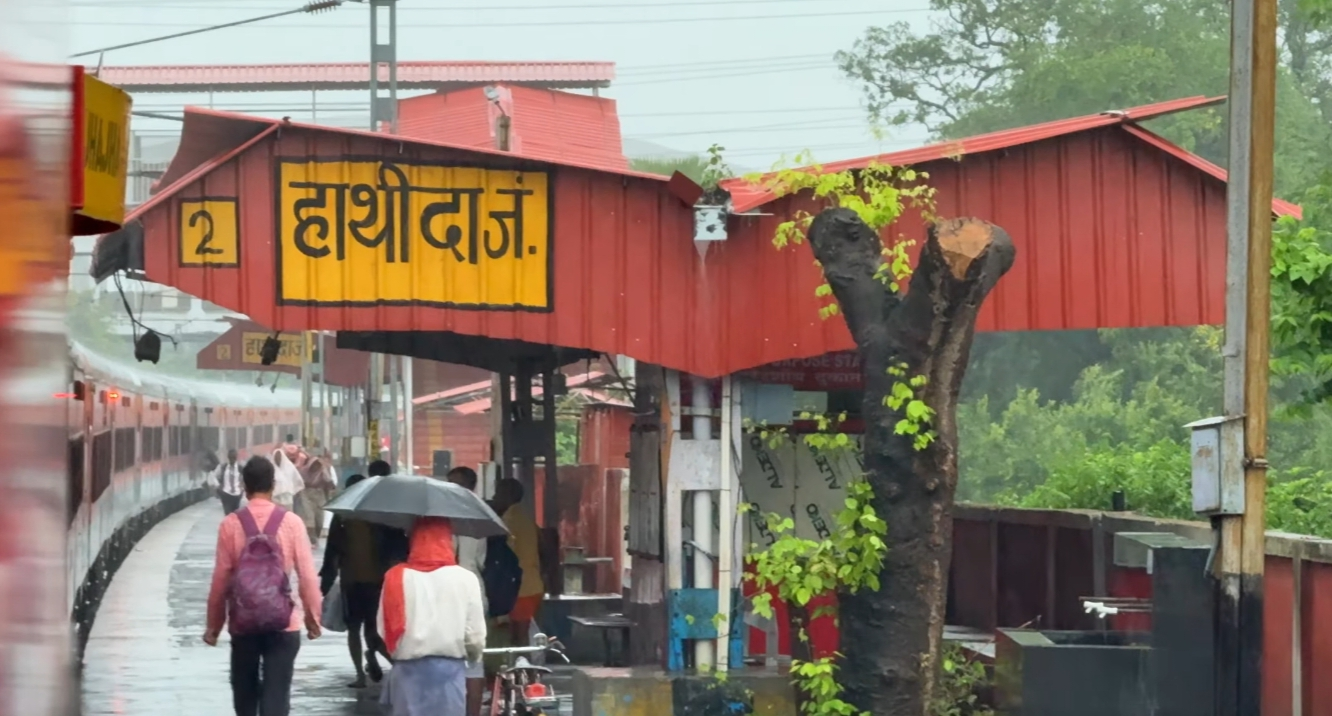
Hathidah Junction

== History ==
- In October 2022, the construction of station buildings, platforms, and foot bridges at Hathidah (HTZ) & Tal (TAL) stations in connection with the "New Mokama Bridge Project" was announced.
- On 11 May 2017, a man along with his son and daughter died after falling off a running train next to the Hathidah Junction Railway Station.
- Sometime in 1994 the rail-line was electrified.
