= Rf factor =

Rf factor may refer to:

== Chemistry ==
- Retardation factor, a variable measured in chromatography

== Biology ==
- Rheumatoid factor, an autoantibody commonly associated with rheumatoid arthritis
