= Fundamental resolution equation =

Equation used in chromatography

The fundamental resolution equation or Purnell equation is used in chromatography to help relate adjustable chromatographic parameters to resolution.

== Equation ==
$R_s = \left(\frac{\sqrt{N}}{4}\right)\left(\frac{\alpha-1}{\alpha}\right)\left(\frac{k'_2}{1+k'_2}\right)$

where,

$N$ = Number of theoretical plates

$\alpha$ = Selectivity Term = $\frac{k'_2}{k'_1}$

The $\frac{\sqrt{N}}{4}$ term is the column factor, the $\frac{\alpha-1}{\alpha}$ term is the thermodynamic factor, and the $\frac{k'_2}{1+k'_2}$ term is the retention factor. The 3 factors are not completely independent, but can be treated as such.

== Intervention ==
To increase resolution of two peaks on a chromatogram, one of the three terms of the equation need to be modified.

- N can be increased by lengthening the column (least effective, as doubling the column will get a $\sqrt{2}$ or 1.44x increase in resolution).
- Increasing $k'$ also helps. This can be done by lowering the column temperature in G.C., or by choosing a weaker mobile phase in L.C. (moderately effective)
- Changing α is the most effective way of increasing resolution. This can be done by choosing a stationary phase that has a greater difference between $k'_1$ and $k'_2$. It can also be done in L.C. by using pH to invoke secondary equilibria (if applicable).

== Resolution ==
The fundamental resolution equation is derived as follows:

For two closely spaced peaks, $\omega_1 = \omega_2$ , and $\sigma_1 = \sigma_2$,

so,

$R_s = \frac{t_{r2}-t_{r1}}{\omega_2} = \frac{t_{r2}-t_{r1}}{4\sigma_2}$

Where $t_{r1}$ and $t_{r2}$ are the retention times of two separate peaks.

Since $N = \left(\frac{t_{r2}}{\sigma_2}\right)^2$ , then $\sigma = \frac{t_{r2}}{\sqrt{N}}$

Using substitution, $R_S = \sqrt{N} \left(\frac{t_{r2}-t_{r1}}{4t_{r2}}\right) = \left(\frac{\sqrt{N}}{4}\right)\left(1-\frac{t_{r1}}{t_{r2}}\right)$.

Now using the following equations and solving for $t_{r1}$ and $t_{r2}$

$k'_1 = \frac{t_{r1}-t_0}{t_0}; \quad t_{r1} = t_0(k'_1+1)$

$k'_2 = \frac{t_{r2}-t_0}{t_0}; \quad t_{r2} = t_0(k'_2+1)$

Substituting again and you get:

$R_s = \left( \frac{\sqrt{N}}{4} \right) \left(1-\frac{k'_1+1}{k'_2+1} \right) = \left(\frac{\sqrt{N}}{4}\right)\left(\frac{k'_2-k'_1}{1+k'_2}\right)$

And finally substituting once more $\alpha = k'_2/k'_1$ and you get the Fundamental Resolution Equation:

$R_s = \left(\frac{\sqrt{N}}{4}\right)\left(\frac{\alpha-1}{\alpha}\right)\left(\frac{k'_2}{1+k'_2}\right)$
