= Retainer =

Retainer may refer to:

- Retainer (orthodontics), devices for teeth
- RFA Retainer (A329), a ship
- Retainers in early China, a social group in early China

== Employment ==
- Retainer agreement, a contract in which an employer pays in advance for work, to be secured or specified later, when required
- Domestic worker or servant, especially one who has been with one family for a long time (chiefly British English)
- Affinity (medieval), also Retinue, a person or group gathered around in the service of a lord

== See also ==
- RETAIN, a mainframe-based database system
- Retainer sacrifice, the sacrifice of a human servant
- Retainer medicine, a relationship between a patient and a primary care physician in which the patient pays an annual fee or retainer
- Retention (disambiguation)
