= Capital cost =

Fixed, one-time expenses in economics

Capital costs are fixed, one-time expenses incurred on the purchase of land, buildings, construction, and equipment used in the production of goods or in the rendering of services. In other words, it is the total cost needed to bring a project to a commercially operable status. Whether a particular cost is capital or not depend on many factors such as accounting, tax laws, and materiality.

== Categories ==
Capital costs include expenses for tangible goods such as the purchase of plants and machinery, as well as expenses for intangibles assets such as trademarks and software development.

Capital costs are not limited to the initial construction of a factory or other business. Namely, the purchase of a new machine to increase production and last for years is a capital cost. Capital costs do not include labor costs (they do include construction labor). Unlike operating costs, capital costs are one-time expenses but payment may be spread out over many years in financial reports and tax returns. Capital costs are fixed and are therefore independent of the level of output.

== Example ==
For example, a fossil fuel power plant's capital costs include the following:

- Purchase of the land upon which the plant is built
- Permits and legal costs
- Equipment needed to run the plant
- Costs involving the construction of the plant
- Financing and commissioning the plant (prior to commercial operation)

They do not include the cost of the natural gas, fuel oil or coal used once the plant enters commercial operation or any taxes on the electricity that is produced. They also do not include the labor used to run the plant or the labor and supplies needed for maintenance.

== Funding ==
Government generally provides subsidies through investments and partnerships in the initial capital costs of research and manufacturing infrastructure that cannot be matched by investor-owned companies.

== See also ==
- Capital expenditure (capex)
- Capital recovery factor
- Capital Cost Allowance (CCA)
- Cost of capital
- Cost overrun
