= Retention uniformity =

Thin-plate chromatographic response function

In thin layer chromatography, retention uniformity (denoted R_{U}) is a quantitative measurement of equal-spreading of the spots on the chromatographic plate and is one of the chromatographic response functions.

== Formula ==
Retention uniformity is calculated from the following formula:

$$R_\mathrm{U}  = 1 - \sqrt{\frac{6(n+1)}{n(2n+1)}\sum_{i=1}^{n}{\left(R_{\mathrm{F}i}-\frac{i}{n+1}\right)^2}}$$

where n is the number of compounds separated and R_{Fi} are the retention factors of each compound i, sorted in non-descending order.

== Theoretical considerations ==
The coefficient lies always in range [0,1] and 0 indicates worst case of separation (all R_{F} values equal to 0 or 1), value 1 indicates ideal equal-spreading of the spots, for example (0.25,0.5,0.75) for three solutes, or (0.2,0.4,0.6,0.8) for four solutes.

This coefficient was proposed as an alternative to earlier approaches, such as D (separation response), I_{p} (performance index) or S_{m} (informational entropy). Besides its stable range, the advantage is a stable distribution as a random variable, regardless of compounds investigated.

In contrast to the similar concept called retention distance, R_{U} is insensitive to R_{F} values close to 0 or 1, or close to themselves. If two values are not separated, it still indicates some uniformity of chromatographic system. For example, the R_{F} values (0,0.2,0.2,0.3) (two compounds not separated at 0.2 and one at the start ) result in R_{U} equal to 0.3609.

== See also ==
- Chromatographic response function
