= Retention distance =

Concept in chromatography

Retention distance (denoted R_{D}) is a concept in thin layer chromatography, designed for quantitative measurement of equal-spreading of the spots on the chromatographic plate and one of the chromatographic response functions. It is calculated from the following formula:

$$R_\mathrm{D} = \Bigg[(n+1)^{(n+1)} \prod^n_{i=0}{(R_{F(i+1)}-R_{Fi})\Bigg]^{\frac{1}{n}}}$$

where n is the number of compounds separated, R_{Fi} are the retardation factors of each compound i sorted in non-descending order, R_{F0} = 0 and R_{F(n + 1)} = 1.

== Theoretical considerations ==
The coefficient lies always in range [0,1] and 0 indicates worst case of separation (all R_{F} values equal to 0 or 1), value 1 indicates ideal equal-spreading of the spots, for example (0.25,0.5,0.75) for three solutes, or (0.2,0.4,0.6,0.8) for four solutes.

This coefficient was proposed as an alternative to earlier approaches, such as delta-Rf, delta-Rf product or MRF (Multispot Response Function). Besides its stable range, the advantage is a stable distribution as a random variable, regardless of compounds investigated.

In contrast to the similar concept called retention uniformity, R_{D} is sensitive to R_{F} values close to 0 or 1, or close to themselves. If two values are not separated, it is equal to 0. For example, the R_{F} values (0,0.2,0.2,0.3) (two compounds not separated at 0.2 and one at the start ) result in R_{D} equal to 0, but R_{U} equal to 0.3609. When some distance from 0 and spots occurs, the value is larger, for example R_{F} values (0.1,0.2,0.25,0.3) give R_{D} = 0.4835, R_{U} = 0.4066.

== See also ==
- Chromatographic response function
