= Chromatographic response function =

Measure of separation quality in a chromatographic system

In chromatography, a chromatographic response function (CRF) is a coefficient which measures the quality of the separation in a chromatographic system.

Chromatographic response functions were created during the development of separation optimization, to compare the quality of many simulated or real chromatographic separations. Many CRFs have been proposed and discussed.

In high performance liquid chromatography, the CRF is calculated from various parameters of the peaks of solutes (like width, retention time, symmetry etc.) are considered into the calculation. In thin layer chromatography, the CRFs are based on the placement of the spots, measured as retardation factor (R_{F}) values.

== Examples in thin layer chromatography ==
The chromatographic response functions in thin layer chromatography characterize the equal-spreading of the spots. The ideal case, when the retardation factor (R_{F}) of the spots are uniformly distributed in [0,1] range (for example 0.25, 0.5 and 0.75 for three solutes) should be characterized as the best situation possible.

The simplest criteria are ΔR_{F} and ΔR_{F} product. They are the smallest difference between sorted retardation factor values, or the product of such differences.

Another function is the multispot response function (MRF) as developed by De Spiegeleer et al. It is based also of differences product. This function always lies between 0 and 1. When two R_{F} values are equal, it is equal to 0, when all R_{F} values are equal-spread, it is equal to 1. The L and U values – upper and lower limit of R_{F} – give possibility to avoid the band region.

$$\mathrm{MRF} = \frac{ (U - hR_{\mathrm{F}n})(hR_\mathrm{F1} - L) \displaystyle \prod^{n-1}_{i=1} (hR_{\mathrm{F}(i+1)} - hR_{\mathrm{F}i})}  {\left(\frac{U - L}{n+1} \right)^{n+1}}$$

The last example of coefficient sensitive to minimal distance between spots is retention distance

$$R_\mathrm{D} = \Bigg[ (n+1)^{n+1} \prod^n_{i=0} {(R_{\mathrm{F}(i+1)} - R_{\mathrm{F}i}) \Bigg]^{\frac{1}{n}}}$$

The second group are criteria insensitive for minimal difference between R_{F} values (if two compounds are not separated, such CRF functions will not indicate it). They are equal to zero in equal-spread state increase when situation is getting worse.

There are:

- Separation response
  $$D = \sqrt{\sum^n_{i=1}\left(R_{\mathrm{F}i} - \frac{i-1}{n-1}\right)}$$
- Performance index
  $$I_\mathrm{p} = \sqrt{\frac{\sum(\Delta hR_{\mathrm{F}i} - \Delta hR_{\mathrm{F}t})^2}{n(n+1)}}$$
- Informational entropy
  $$S_\mathrm{m} = \sqrt{\frac{\sum(\Delta hR_{\mathrm{F}i} - \Delta hR_{\mathrm{F}t})^2}{n+1}}$$
- Retention uniformity
  $$R_\mathrm{U}  = 1 - \sqrt{\frac{6(n+1)}{n(2n+1)}\sum_{i=1}^{n}{\left(R_{\mathrm{F}i} - \frac{i}{n+1} \right)^2}}$$

In all above formulas, n is the number of compounds separated, R_{Fi} is the retention factor of each compound i sorted in non-descending order, R_{F0} = 0 and R_{F(n + 1)} = 1.

== See also ==
- Chromatography
