= Water retention =

Water retention can refer to:

- Water retention (medicine), an abnormal accumulation of fluid in the circulatory system or within the tissues or cavities of the body
  - Edema, an abnormal accumulation of fluid beneath the skin, or in one or more cavities of the body
  - Premenstrual water retention, a common phenomenon associated with the menstrual cycle
- Water retention curve, relationship between soil water content and water pressure head
- Water retention on mathematical surfaces, topographic surfaces with basins
- Soil water (retention), the capacity of soil to hold water not removed by runoff, drainage or evaporation
- Retention basin
