= Circle rules football =

Team sport invented in 2006

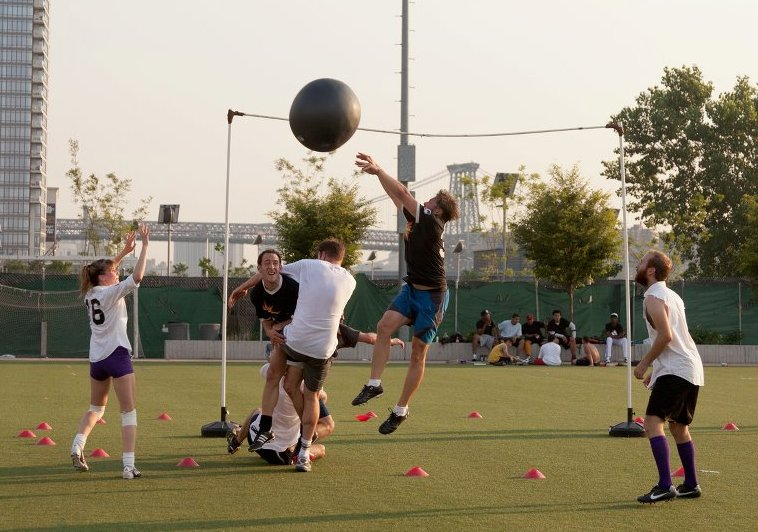
- A game of circle rules football
- Highest governing body: Circle Rules Federation
- Nicknames: Circle rules or Zulouball, CRF
- First played: 2006; 20 years ago in New York City

Characteristics
- Contact: Contact
- Team members: 6
- Mixed-sex: Coed
- Type: Team sport, ball sport

Circle rules football, commonly referred to as circle rules, is a team sport played between two teams of six with a large spherical ball similar to a stability ball. Invented in New York City in 2006, the sport is currently played in cities across the United States, as well as in several international locations.

The game is played on a circular field with a central goal. The goal has no net, as the two teams score through the goal from opposing directions. Around the goal is a circular area called the "key", which only the teams' goalies may enter. Players outside the key may touch the ball with any part of their bodies, allowing them to dribble, kick, roll, carry, and throw the ball, but they may not hold the ball in any way that restricts its movement. The team that scores the most goals by the end of the match wins.

== Gameplay ==
Each team consists of six players (excluding substitutes), one of whom is the goalkeeper. Teams may be mixed-gender, though they are not required to be. Two referees are on the field at all times; one watches over the key to call key violations and ensure the safety of the goalies, while the other moves freely around the field.

An official game consists of four fifteen-minute periods. Prior to the start of the game, a representative from each team participates in a "down-up". The two players stand opposite each other; on the referee's signal, they race to touch both shoulder blades to the ground and return to a stationary standing position. As in a coin toss, the winner of the down-up gets to choose which direction his team will score and whether his team will kick off or receive the ball at the start of the match.

The team that is kicking off gathers inside the key, while the other team takes up their positions outside. After the kick off, the kicking team must wait inside the key until a member of the other team has touched the ball; at this point the kicking team is released from the key, and no players except the goalies may reenter it until a goal has been scored. After each goal, the scoring team gathers inside the key and repeats this procedure.

Goals are scored by putting the ball through the goalposts in a team's designated direction. Each goal is worth one point. Outside the key, players may touch the ball with any part of their body, but they cannot hold the ball with two hands or hold it against their body in a way that restricts the ball's movement. Players are free to dribble, kick, roll, carry, throw, and strike the ball, and they may move it in any direction around the field.

Physical contact between players on the field is limited. Incidental contact, as well as contact that is the result of a movement that causes contact with the ball before contact with another player, is generally not penalized. The referees' discretion plays a large role in determining the type and intensity of contact that is allowed on the field.

Inside the key, the goalies attempt to defend their own side of the goal, while allowing their team to score through from the opposite direction. Goalies have full contact with each other, allowing them to grapple; dangerous moves such as striking and contact above the neck however are forbidden. Goalies may leave the key to pursue the ball, but they may not have contact with each other outside the key. Goalies may not score for their own teams.

The team with the most goals at the end of the match wins. In the event of a tie, two five-minute halves of overtime are played.

=== Field and equipment ===
The game is generally played on a circular field of grass or artificial turf, though it can also be played on other surfaces, including pavement and sand. The field is 50 meters in diameter. The goal (four meters wide and three meters high) sits in the center of the field, surrounded by a circular area called the key (8 meters in diameter).

The goalposts are typically constructed of 3/4 inch PVC piping, a common material found in most hardware stores.

The spherical ball (55 cm in diameter), made of a soft elastic, closely resembles a stability ball.

=== Penalties ===
The most common penalties are known as "key violations". Any non-goalkeeper who sets foot inside the key (at any time other than kickoff) receives a 30-second suspension from the game without a replacement. If a non-goalkeeper touches the ball while inside the key, the suspension is extended to 60 seconds. Any player who receives three key violations in one game will be suspended from the game for five minutes without a replacement.

Contact violations on the field are similar to soccer or basketball. Inadvertent violations result in a direct kick for the opposing team. Flagrant contact violations result in a 60-second ejection of the offending player and a direct kick. Malicious contact violations result in ejection from the game without replacement. Three violations within a game result in the player being ejected for the remainder of the game, but they may be replaced after any ejection penalties if the final violation was not malicious.

A penalty may also be called on a player for holding the ball. The penalty for holding is an indirect free kick for the opposing team from the spot of the violation.

== History ==
Circle rules football was created by Gregory Manley in 2006 as a senior thesis project for the Experimental Theater Wing, a division of New York University's Tisch School of the Arts. The project aimed to highlight the similarities between drama and athletics, demonstrating that "everything inherent in theater is inherent in sports".

The game has been played regularly in Brooklyn's Prospect Park since its inception. In the spring of 2009, Circle Rules Federation began running an official competitive league in Brooklyn. The first championship title was won by The Flying Mordecais.

Also in 2009, circle rules football was featured in the Come Out & Play Festival, where it won the "Most Original Sport" and "Best in Festival" awards; it was also featured at igfest 2009, where it was named "Best in Festival" and "Most Likely to be Played Again".

Official league play resumed in Brooklyn in 2010, and The Flying Mordecais successfully defended their title. In both the 2011 and 2012 seasons, upstart team The Rebel Rousers went undefeated and claimed the championship.

== Variations ==
In casual matches, a slightly pared-down version of the game, known as "small rules", is often played. Small rules is played without goalies, and the width of the goal and the key are reduced to two and six meters, respectively. In this version of the game, players may enter the key, but they still may not touch the ball inside the area—unless their last point of contact with the ground was outside the key (as in the case of a jump or dive). Small rules is typically played with four members per team on the field at a time.

Since fall 2007, an event called the Harvest Tournament has been held annually. For this tournament, a unique 3-on-3 version of small rules is played. The sixth Harvest Tournament took place in Prospect Park in October 2012.

In March 2010, an indoor variation of circle rules football was introduced in London.
