= Dual electrification =

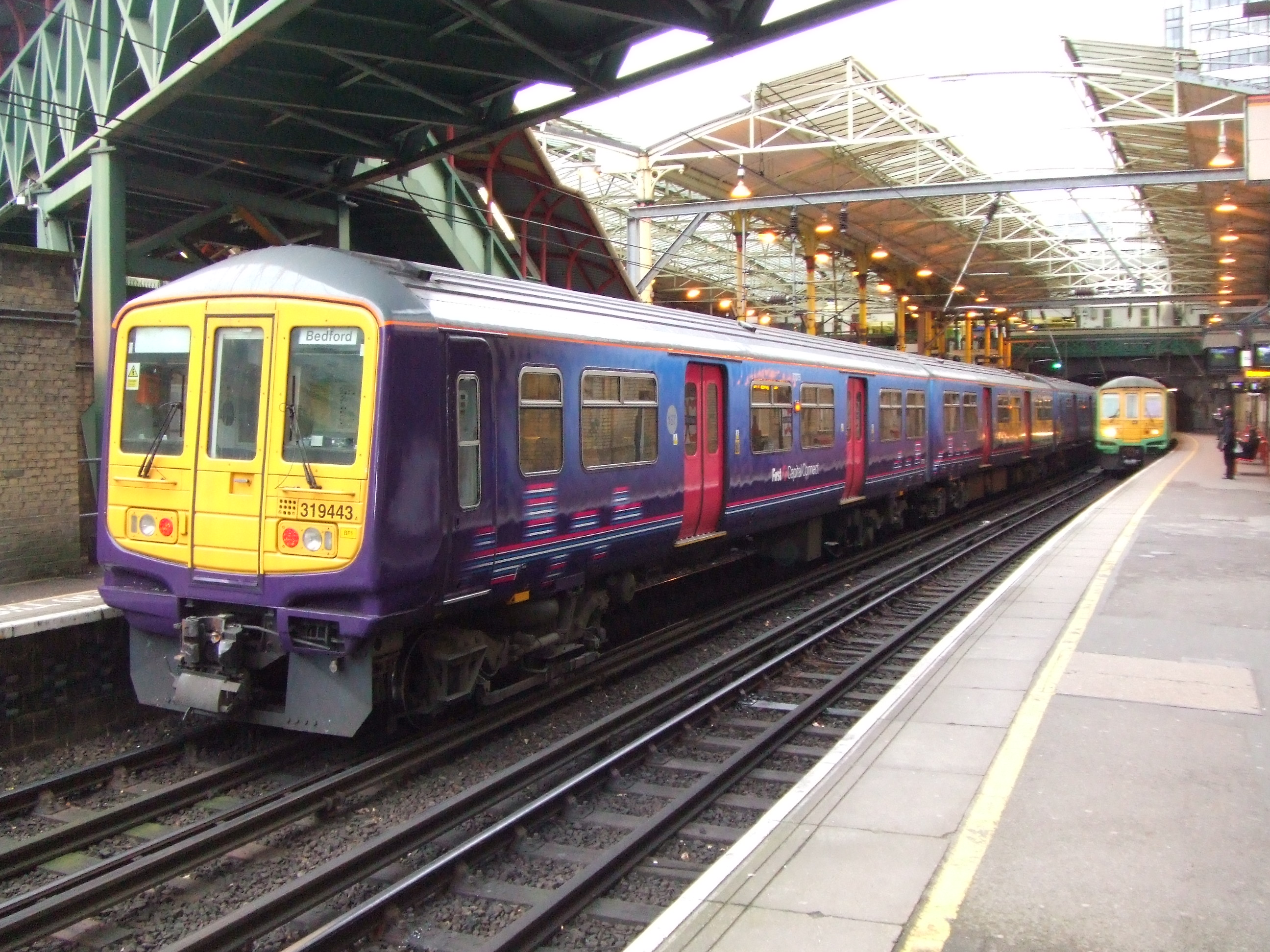
This photo shows an overhead catenary power line above the foreground train, and a third rail on the ground beside it.

Dual electrification is a system whereby a railway line is supplied power both via overhead catenary and a third rail. This is done to enable trains that use either system of power to share the same railway line, for example in the case of mainline and suburban trains (as used at Hamburg S-Bahn between 1940 and 1955).

== Examples ==
=== Germany ===
- Line S3 of the Hamburg S-Bahn changeover at Neugraben.
- Birkenwerder station to be used by Berlin S-Bahn lines S1 and S8 (third rail) and regional train RB20 (overhead lines)

=== Greece ===
- Line 3 of Athens Metro uses third rail for the underground sections and an overhead power supply on the surface for access to and from the Airport.

=== Norway ===
- between Jar station and Bekkestua station, where metro line 3 and tram line 13 share tracks

=== United Kingdom ===
- North London Line changeover at Acton Central, London.
- Northern City Line changeover at Drayton Park, London.
- Thameslink route changeover at City Thameslink (northbound) and Farringdon (southbound), London.
- West London line changeover between Willesden Junction and Shepherd's Bush, London.
- High Speed 1 changeover at platforms 5 and 6 of Ebbsfleet International, Kent.

=== United States ===
- South of Pelham station (New York), where New Haven Line's M8's change from 3rd rail to catenary (northbound) and vice versa (southbound).
- Pennsylvania Station (New York City)
- East River Tunnels between Queens and Manhattan in New York City, NY
- North River Tunnels between Weehawken, NJ and New York City, NY
- Like Athens, the MBTA Blue Line (Boston) uses third rail for the underground part, and switches to overhead catenary power at Airport station.

=== Mainland China ===
- Line 4, 5, 6, 14, and 21 of Guangzhou Metro use third rails in operation but catenaries in depots.

== Variations ==
=== Both systems live ===
The system is usually used only in exceptional cases as it can lead to problems caused by the interaction of the electric circuits; for example, where one system is powered with direct current and another by alternating current (AC), premagnetisation of the substation transformers of the AC system can occur.

=== One system live ===
A similar arrangement to dual electrification is one in which both means of powering a train are present, but not live simultaneously. Such arrangements can be found in frontier stations and in sections of railway used for running tests.

== See also ==
- Multi-system (rail)
