= Capital recovery factor =

Financial concept

A capital recovery factor is the ratio of a constant annuity to the present value of receiving that annuity for a given length of time. Using an interest rate i, the capital recovery factor is:

$CRF = \frac {i(1+i)^n}{(1+i)^n-1}$

where $n$ is the number of annuities received.

This is related to the annuity formula, which gives the present value in terms of the annuity, the interest rate, and the number of annuities.

If $n = 1$, the $CRF$ reduces to $1+i$. Also, as $n \to \infty$, the $CRF \to i$.

In the limit of zero interest rate, $\lim_{i\rightarrow 0} CRF = 1/n$ (L'Hôpital's rule).

== Example ==
With an interest rate of i = 10%, and n = 10 years, the CRF = 0.163. This means that a loan of $1,000 at 10% interest will be paid back with 10 annual payments of $163.

Another reading that can be obtained is that the net present value of 10 annual payments of $163 at 10% discount rate is $1,000.
