= Retardation factor =

Fraction of mobile-phase analyte in a chromatographic system

In chromatography, the retardation factor (R) is the fraction of an analyte in the mobile phase of a chromatographic system. In planar chromatography in particular, the retardation factor R_{F} is defined as the ratio of the distance traveled by the center of a spot to the distance traveled by the solvent front. Ideally, the values for R_{F} are equivalent to the R values used in column chromatography.

Although the term retention factor is sometimes used synonymously with retardation factor in regard to planar chromatography, the term is not defined in this context. However, in column chromatography, the retention factor or capacity factor (k) is defined as the ratio of time an analyte is retained in the stationary phase to the time it is retained in the mobile phase, which is inversely proportional to the retardation factor.

== General definition ==
In chromatography, the retardation factor, R, is the fraction of the sample in the mobile phase at equilibrium, defined as:

$$R = \frac{\text{quantity of substance in the mobile phase}}{\text{total quantity of substance in the system}}$$

== Planar chromatography ==
The retardation factor, R_{F}, is commonly used in paper chromatography and thin layer chromatography (TLC) for analyzing and comparing different substances. It can be mathematically described by the following ratio:

$$R_\mathrm{F} = \frac{\text{migration distance of substance}}{\text{migration distance of solvent front}}$$

An R_{F} value will always be in the range 0 to 1; if the substance moves, it can only move in the direction of the solvent flow, and cannot move faster than the solvent. For example, if particular substance in an unknown mixture travels 2.5 cm and the solvent front travels 5.0 cm, the retardation factor would be 0.50. One can choose a mobile phase with different characteristics (particularly polarity) in order to control how far the substance being investigated migrates.

An R_{F} value is characteristic for any given compound (provided that the same stationary and mobile phases are used). It can provide corroborative evidence as to the identity of a compound. If the identity of a compound is suspected but not yet proven, an authentic sample of the compound, or standard, is spotted and run on a TLC plate side by side (or on top of each other) with the compound in question. Note that this identity check must be performed on a single plate, because it is difficult to duplicate all the factors which influence R_{F} exactly from experiment to experiment.

== Relationship with retention factor ==
In terms of retention factor (k), retardation factor (R) is defined as follows:

$$R = \frac{1}{1+k}$$

based on the definition of k:

$$k = \frac{1-R}{R}$$
