= Canton of Thorigny-sur-Marne =

Coordinates: 48°52′29″N 2°45′24″E

Thorigny-sur-Marne
- Former canton
- Interactive map of Thorigny-sur-Marne
- Country: France
- Region: Île-de-France
- Department: Seine-et-Marne
- No. of communes: {{{nbcomm}}}
- Disbanded: 2015
- Area: 81.14 km^{2} (31.33 sq mi)
- Population (2012): 60,251
  - Density: 742.6/km^{2} (1,923/sq mi)

The canton of Thorigny-sur-Marne (pronounced [tɔʁiɲi syʁ maʁn]) is a French former administrative division, located in the arrondissement of Torcy, in the Seine-et-Marne département (Île-de-France région). It was disbanded following the French canton reorganisation which came into effect in March 2015.

== Demographics ==
Historical population
Year	Pop.	±%
1999	34,833	—
2006	48,279	+38.6%
2012	60,251	+24.8%

== Composition ==
The canton of Thorigny-sur-Marne was composed of 16 communes:

- Bailly-Romainvilliers
- Carnetin
- Chalifert
- Chanteloup-en-Brie
- Chessy
- Conches-sur-Gondoire
- Coupvray
- Dampmart
- Guermantes
- Jablines
- Jossigny
- Lesches
- Magny-le-Hongre
- Montévrain
- Serris
- Thorigny-sur-Marne

== See also ==
- Cantons of the Seine-et-Marne department
- Communes of the Seine-et-Marne department
