= Marne-la-Vallée =

New town in Île-de-France, France

Coordinates: 48°51′33″N 2°35′55″E

Sections of Marne-la-Vallée The different communes making up Marne-la-Vallée: (Note: Nos communes, nos collectivités. Retrieved on 31 December 2013.) (Note: Carte des communes de la ville nouvelle. Retrieved on 31 December 2013.) Sector I (Porte de Paris): 3 communes. Sector II (Val Maubuée): 6 communes. Sector III (Val de Bussy): 12 communes. Sector IV (Val d'Europe): 10 communes, and, in light green, Villeneuve-le-Comte.

Marne-la-Vallée (French: [maʁn la vale]; English: Marne Valley) is a new town east of Paris, France. It spans across three departments: Seine-et-Marne, Seine-Saint-Denis and Val-de-Marne.

Disneyland Paris (including Disneyland Park and Disney Adventure World), Val d'Europe, the Université Paris-Est Marne-la-Vallée (existed 1991-2020), ESIEE Paris, as well as the École des Ponts ParisTech are located in Marne-la-Vallée.

== Status ==
Marne-la-Vallée has been gradually built up since the first plans in 1965 and now covers an area of over 15,000 hectares (37,000 acres) and includes 31 communes, in the départements of Seine-et-Marne, Seine-Saint-Denis and Val-de-Marne. Total population (2007) is 282,150.

For administrative purposes, the area has been divided into four sectors:

Department	Seine-Saint-Denis; Val-de-Marne	Seine-et-Marne			
Sector	Porte de Paris	Val Maubuée	Val de Bussy		Val d'Europe
List of communes	1. Noisy-le-Grand; 2. Bry-sur-Marne; 3. Villiers-sur-Marne	1. Champs-sur-Marne; 2. Croissy-Beaubourg; 3. Émerainville; 4. Lognes; 5. Noisiel; 6. Torcy	1. Bussy-Saint-Georges; 2. Bussy-Saint-Martin; 3. Chanteloup-en-Brie; 4. Collégien; 5. Conches-sur-Gondoire; 6. Ferrières-en-Brie	7. Gouvernes; 8. Guermantes; 9. Jossigny; 10. Lagny-sur-Marne; 11. Montévrain; 12. Saint-Thibault-des-Vignes	1. Bailly-Romainvilliers; 2. Chessy; 3. Coupvray; 4. Magny-le-Hongre; 5. Serris; 6. Villeneuve-le-Comte; 7. Villeneuve-Saint-Denis; 8. Esbly; 9. Montry; 10. Saint-Germain-sur-Morin

== Demographics ==
As of 1990 fewer than 10,000 persons of East/Southeast Asian origin resided in six communes of Marne-la-Vallée. 26% of the population of Lognes was Asian, and other percentages were 8% in Noisiel, 5-6% in Noisy-le-Grand, and 5-6% in Torcy. In 1982 there were 6,000 Asians in Marne-la-Vallée, making up 3-4% of the area's population. In 1987 the number increased to 9,000.

== Economy ==
Marne-la-Vallée in relation to Paris

== Education ==
- École des ponts ParisTech

== In popular culture ==
Louise, the main character in Éric Rohmer's 1984 film Full Moon in Paris, shares an apartment with her partner Rémi in Marne-la-Vallée.
