= Bussy-Saint-Georges =

- Commune
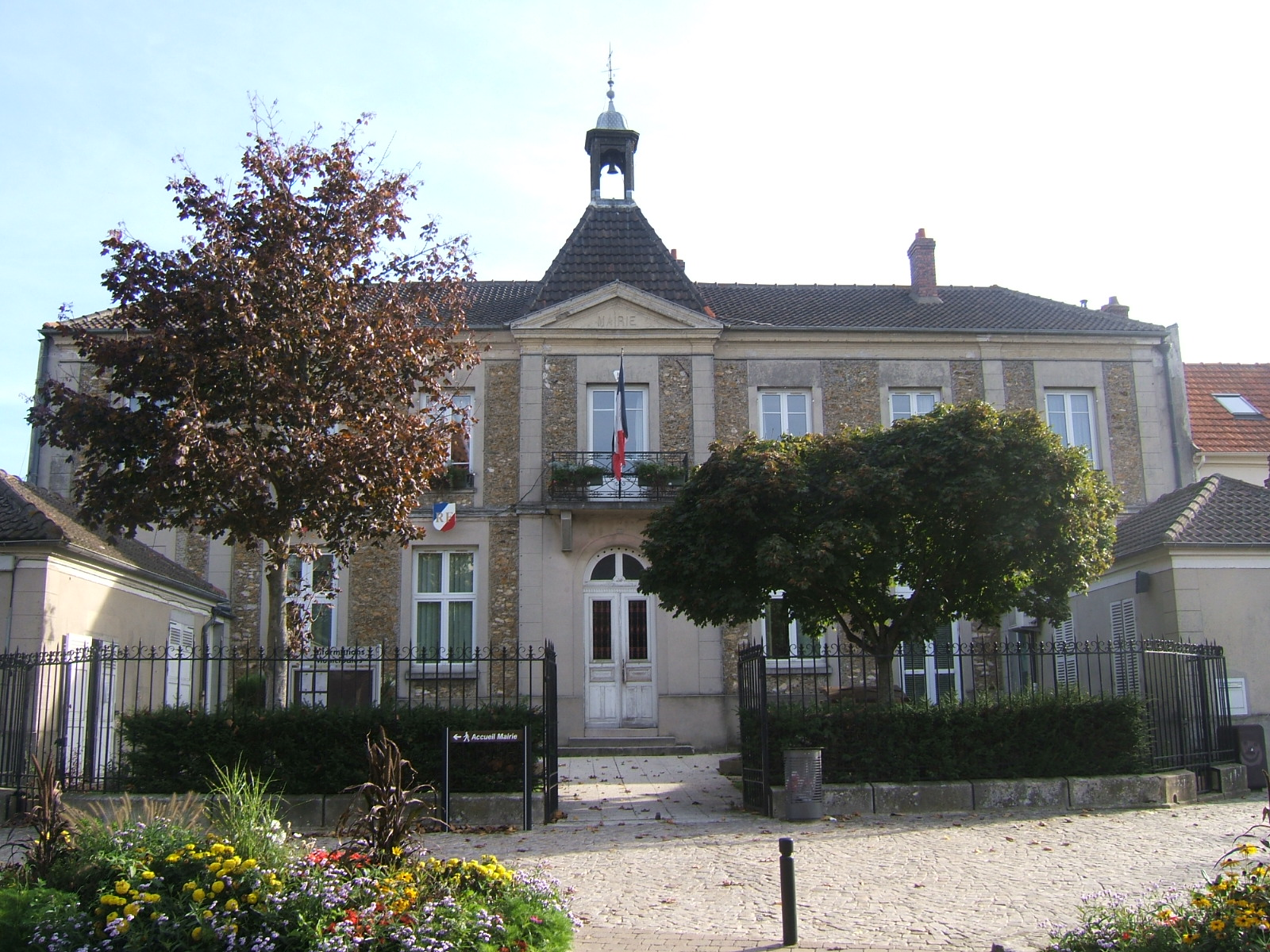
- The Hôtel de Ville

- Coat of arms

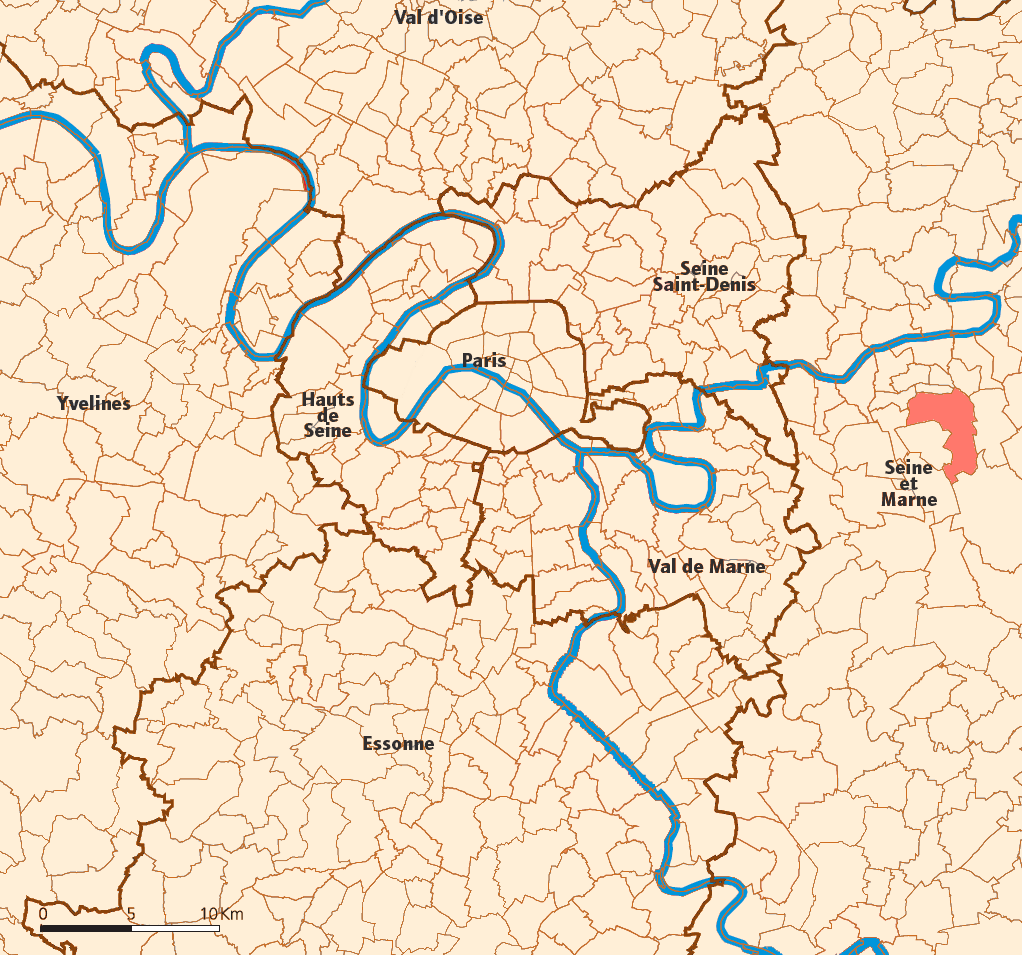
- Location (in red) within Paris inner and outer suburbs
- Location of Bussy-Saint-Georges
- Location within France Location within Île-de-France (region)
- Coordinates: 48°50′32″N 2°41′54″E
- Country: France
- Region: Île-de-France
- Department: Seine-et-Marne
- Arrondissement: Torcy
- Canton: Torcy
- Intercommunality: CA Marne et Gondoire

Government
  - Mayor (2020–2026): Yann Dubosc
- Area^{1}: 13.39 km^{2} (5.17 sq mi)
- Highest elevation: 130 m (430 ft)
- Lowest elevation: 63 m (207 ft)
- Population (2023): 27,498
  - Density: 2,054/km^{2} (5,319/sq mi)
- Time zone: UTC+01:00 (CET)
  - Summer (DST): UTC+02:00 (CEST)
- INSEE/Postal code: 77058 /77600
- ^{1} French Land Register data, which excludes lakes, ponds, glaciers > 1 km^{2} (0.386 sq mi or 247 acres) and river estuaries.

Bussy-Saint-Georges (pronounced [bysi sɛ̃ ʒɔʁʒ]) is a commune in the eastern suburbs of Paris, France. It is located 25.5 km (15.8 miles) from the center of Paris, in the Seine-et-Marne department in the Île-de-France region in north-central France.

== Geography ==
In the East, at the distance 30 kilometres (19 miles) from Paris and in the heart of Marne-la-Vallée, Bussy-Saint-Georges has a privileged position thanks to a high-density motorway network. From Bussy, the direct access to the A4 motorway and the nearby A104 offer easy access to the whole country.

The city centre is only 7 km (4.3 mi) away from Disneyland Paris.

With easy access to the RER line, close to the TGV railway station of Chessy – Marne-la-Vallée and two international airports Roissy-Charles-de-Gaulle and Orly, the city has a central position in the transport network.

Bussy-Saint-Georges is located in the perimeter of the new city of Marne-la-Vallée as defined by the national government in 1966. But Marne-la-Vallée is just a geographical entity, precisely divided in 4 sectors. The city is in sector 3 of Marne-la-Vallée, also called Val-de-Bussy.

In Val-de-Bussy of Marne-la-Vallée, Bussy-Saint-Georges is from 1985 the leading and main support of the built-up area, as a real and independent new town (French: Ville nouvelle) with a unique status of local and new town. The others towns decided to be organized around a common agglomeration system of new towns.

=== Surrounding towns ===
- Bussy-Saint-Martin
- Chanteloup-en-Brie
- Collégien
- Favières
- Ferrières-en-Brie
- Guermantes
- Jossigny
- Pontcarré

Bussy-Saint-Georges has built its identity on a green model environment with parks and gardens. They represent 155 hectares of integrated green spaces, 9 kilometres (6 miles) of soft connecting links, ten squares and parks in the city centre, eight pools and more than 8,200 trees today.

== Population ==
The city has benefited from one of the largest growth rates in France. The population has multiplied by 56 in 30 years, between 1982 and 2012.

Historical population

Year	Pop.	±% p.a.
1793	475	—
1800	497	+0.65%
1806	542	+1.46%
1821	535	−0.09%
1831	538	+0.06%
1836	518	−0.75%
1841	487	−1.23%
1846	516	+1.16%
1851	521	+0.19%
1856	566	+1.67%
1861	553	−0.46%
1866	537	−0.59%
1872	540	+0.09%
1876	518	−1.03%
1881	534	+0.61%
1886	558	+0.88%
1891	552	−0.22%
1896	608	+1.95%
1901	639	+1.00%

Year	Pop.	±% p.a.
1906	629	−0.31%
1911	608	−0.68%
1921	537	−1.23%
1926	560	+0.84%
1931	654	+3.15%
1936	570	−2.71%
1946	442	−2.51%
1954	510	+1.80%
1962	453	−1.47%
1968	462	+0.33%
1975	441	−0.66%
1982	456	+0.48%
1990	1,545	+16.48%
1999	9,194	+21.92%
2007	20,013	+10.21%
2012	25,615	+5.06%
2017	27,379	+1.34%
2023	27,498	+0.07%

Source: EHESS and INSEE (1968-2023)

Bussy-Saint-Georges has a strong power of attraction on young families. 50% of the Buxangeorgiens are less than 30 years old.

== History ==
In the origins, the village of Bussy appeared in 841 under the Roman name of Villa Buxido. In 855 the territory formed a large parish under the protection of Saint-Georges. Nevertheless, the full name of Bussy-Saint-Georges only appeared in the 13th century. The name of Bussy comes from Buscus because of the city's native environment initially composed of woods and many groves. In the Middle Ages, Bussy-Saint-Martin et Bussy-Saint-Georges was unified under a unique landlord authority, the lords of Bussy. Here is the list of the successive lords of Bussy:

- de Buci family from 1196 to 1490;
- de la Rosque from 1490 to the end of the 16th century;
- Louis Guibert and his heirs from the end of the 16th century to the beginning of the 18th century;
- at the beginning of the 18th century until the French Revolution, the family of Pondre, lord of Guermantes.

In 1789, Bussy-Saint-Georges was under the authority of the Généralité of Paris.

During the 19th century, the town was in the county of Lagny, with a population from 500 to 550 inhabitants. Two ordinances, 6 June 1826 and 15 August 1827 reduced the territory of Bussy in favour of the territories of Ferrières and Jossigny.

Since 1985, Bussy-Saint-Georges has been integrated into the perimeter of the new town plan of Marne-la-Vallée and received a total of 180.50 hectares as additional territories coming from the nearest towns (Bussy-Saint-Martin, Collégien, Ferrières).

In July 2017, M. Hugues Rondeau, who has been the mayor from 1998 until 2014, was considered as guilty by French justice for illegal taking of interest and condemned to six months of suspended prison, payment of 60.000 euros for damage and interest, and ineligibility for five years. In May 2019, he was banned from public service for life by the Court.

== Administration ==
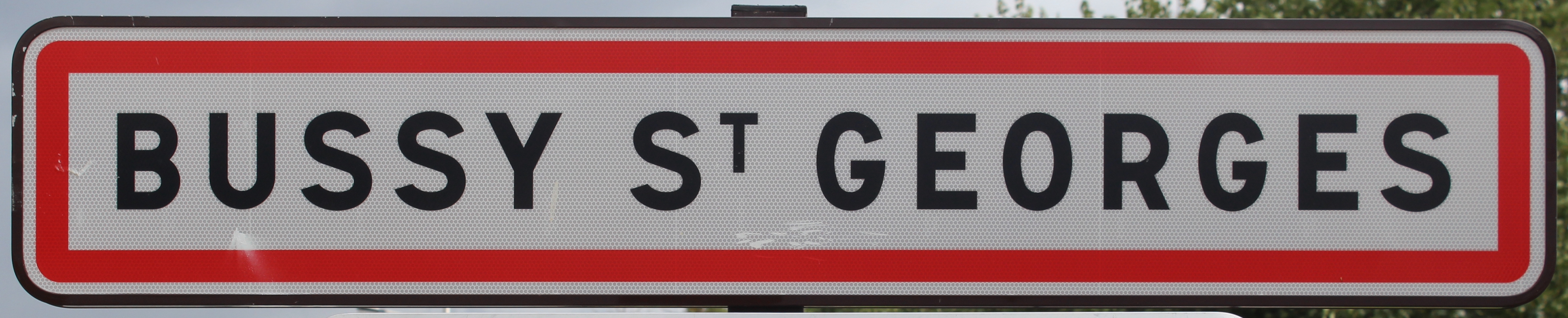
Entrance sign.

Bussy-Saint-Georges is in the Canton of Torcy, in the administrative département of Seine-et-Marne; its prefecture is Melun. The canton brings together six towns and 38,236 inhabitants. Before its creation in 1975, the city of Bussy was in the Canton of Lagny-sur-Marne, finally divided in smaller new subdivisions considering the growth of population.

The canton of Torcy is now part of the arrondissement of Torcy created in 1993. The subprefecture was opened on 1 January 2006.

This arrondissement is the least geographically extended but the most populated of the department, with 10 cantons, 43 towns representing 343,583 inhabitants.

The Hôtel de Ville (town hall), built in 1850, stands in the old village, on the Place de la Mairie (Town hall square).

== Main sights ==
- The tower, the only vestige of the lord’s castle of de Buci, a fortress offering a strategic refuge dominating the valleys de la Brosse and de la Gondoire, dated from 12th century. The current place de Verdun is on the previous location of the castle, which was surrounded by the ditches filled with water by the same source of a fountain which still exists in the place du marché. The graveyard, in the north of the tower, beyond the fortifications, was discovered during a private house building in 1960. The tower is 21 meters high and 9 meters large.
- The Farm of Roquemont. It takes its name from la Rosque’s fief, Bussy-Saint-Georges lords from 1490 to 1594; it was also the main source of the lords for the benefit of Bussy fief. Later, the farm was called the great farm of Bussy-Saint-Georges.
- The Russon mill, a water mill is located in the street of de la Brosse. The former owner has restored it. The mill was a component of the outbuildings of the Farm of Roquemont. It was used as a mill only for a few months and was otherwise used as accommodation for the farm hands.
- The Wash-house, built in the mid-19th century. Bussy already used a very old wash-house close to spring in Ferrières: the wash-house of Cessoy. But it was too far from the center of the village and difficult to reach for the washerwomen who used barrows for the laundry. The city council bargained with the family de Guermantesfor to acquire land attached to another spring, in the upper side of the street du Moulin, for building the second wash-house. Currently, the wash-house of Cessoy is private, in contrast to the public one in the street du Moulin.
- The Farm of Génitoy. The name, genesterium in Latin or genestay in Old French, later génitoire or génitoy, originates from the abundant Genista flowers. The farm was also an important fief with a castle. In 1672, Madame de Montespan had a baby in the castle of Génitoy, one of the Louis XIV's son: Louis-César de Bourbon, count of Vexin.
- La Jonchère. At the beginning of the 19th century, this was a great farm. The owner was M. Martin de Longchamps, who also owned Fontenelles. It was a féculerie in 1836, which dominated all the intensive potato production in the region. Unfortunately from 1845 potato blight affected the activity and then completely stopped it. The farmers decided to replace it with sugar beet. The domaine de la Jonchère was used for establishing the installations of the new product.
- The current village church was constructed on the location of a medieval church. François de la Rosque, parish priest, member of the lord of Bussy’s family, celebrated the consecration of the church in 1580. The construction was finished in 1595 and the baptism of the three bells followed on August 22, 1600: Louise, in reference to the foundation of the St-Louis chapel, Isabelle, a first name of the wife of Louis Guibert, and Georges, patron saint of the parish. The church was restored in the 19th century and, at the request of the inhabitants who were disappointed for not hearing the Angélus, the bell tower was raised in 1866 to the current height of 32 meters. The church became public property in 1905. Under the porch of the monument, there is an 18th-century gravestone. It covered the body of abbot Duchesne buried in the chancel of the church. Inside, the body and the transept have a refined ogival style. The beams hold a painted vault in the arch. On the right side, there is a Saint-Georges sculpture. On the left is a chapel, probably for the translation of relics in 1431, given to the parish of Bussy-Saint-Georges by the abott Duchesne, restored in 1904 thanks to a group of the Visitation of the Virgin. The baptistery has a renaissance underbody and the washbowl of a ceremony is decorated with four angel’s heads. We can also notice an embedded stone font on the left of the entrance.
- The modern church of Notre-Dame du Val, built in 1997 by the architectural office Gonot-Marcenat. Fully made with modern components, the dome is in natural copper. The location is at 33, boulevard Thibaud-de-Champagne.
- Rêve de la Mère: a statue erected in 2010 dedicated to the Boat people and refugees from the Vietnam War. Bussy-Saint-Georges is home to a significant Vietnamese population, and the statue is a symbol for Vietnamese refugees seeing France as a free nation and is a reminder for French-born Vietnamese of their ancestral roots and culture.

== Culture and leisure ==
- City Library: The Médiathèque de l’Europe was inaugurated in October 2006. In it can be found CDs, books (novels, comics, documentaries, magazines etc.), DVDs, music scores…

The library also welcomes a large range of activities put in place by the cultural department of the city. Currently, the hours of opening concern the following days: Tuesday from 2pm to 7pm, Wednesday 10am – 12:30am and 2pm to 6pm, Thursday 2pm – 6pm, and Sunday 10am – 12:30am and 2pm – 6pm.

- Conservatoire: The Jean-Sébastien-Bach Conservatoire of Bussy-Saint-Georges opened its doors in 1995. Widened in 2004, the expanse for the reception of people was doubled. In 2006 more than 700 pupils and 45 employees were involved, 28 individual instrumental disciplines (some of these instruments are "rare" such as harpsichord, viola de gamba or traditional Chinese ones: pipa, guzheng) and 10 steel band disciplines.

== Education ==
Bussy-Saint-Georges is home to:

- 9 preschools, 9 primary schools
- 3 public junior high schools (Jacques-Yves-Cousteau, Anne-Frank, Claude-Monet) and a private junior high school, Maurice-Rondeau
- 2 senior high schools/sixth-form colleges
  - Lycée Martin-Luther-King
  - Lycée Maurice-Rondeau
- capacity of 200 young children in day-care centers
- an artistic conservatoire
- a city library

University of Marne-la-Vallée is the area university, and the vicinity has other post-secondary institutions.

== Sport ==
- Michel Jazy Sport Complex, including a dance room, gymnastic structures, tennis courts, martial art areas, volleyball area.
- Maurice Herzog Sport Complex, including athletics training tracks, football space, archery practicing area, gymnastic room, climbing wall, a table tennis room.
- Laura Flessel Sport Complex.
- 5 tennis courts on the path of deux Châteaux, 2 outdoor courts on the golfers’ promenade, 2 outdoor courts at the Graveyard street.
- An international golf area covering 750,000 square metres.

== Economy ==
Within its territory, the city has an industrial region (Gustave Eiffel Park) located in the south of the city. Among the listed companies, there are Tech Data, SME Distribution (Sony), IBM, Air liquide, Asialand, BT France companies,... There are also a Senior Teaching Technical Book Center (Centre technique du livre de l'enseignement supérieur) and the Technical Center of the French National Library (Centre technique de la Bibliothèque nationale de France). The city economic growth continues with the creation of new city planning areas or Zone d’Aménagement Concerté, such as the ZAC Léonardo-de-Vinci (30 hectares) or the Rucherie (80 hectares). But the debts of the town may be considered as huge.

== Transport ==
In the center of the city, there is the Bussy-Saint-Georges station of the RER line. There is also a bus network ("Pep’s").

== Festivals ==
All through the year, the city of Bussy-Saint-Georges offers to its inhabitants a large list of celebrations:

- Wishes of the Buxangeorgiens: January
- Festival of Asia (Tết): February
- Carnival days: March
- Saint George's day: April
- Journée nationale du souvenir de la déportation et ravivage de la flamme du souvenir: April
- Commemoration of the end of World War II: 8 May
- antique roadshow days: June
- Commemoration for dead soldiers in French Indochina: 8 June
- Commemoration of the Général de Gaulle's call: 18 June
- Nation day (pyrotechnics): 13 July
- Golf Open of the city: September
- Forum of the associations: September
- Les virades de l’Espoir (important march for the custic fibrosis cure research): September
- Secondhand trade days: September
- Commemoration of the Armistice in 1918: 11 November
- Night of the Beaujolais: November
- Commemoration for dead soldiers during the north-African wars: 5 December
- Christmas Time (marché de noël, animations, patinoire): December and January.

== People ==
- Maurice Boitel, painter

== International relations ==
Bussy-Saint-Georges is twinned with:

- Radcliffe-on-Trent, United Kingdom, since 1999
- Kiryat Ekron, Israel, since 1998
- San Giuliano Milanese, Italy, since 2002
- Meiningen, Germany, since 2006

== List of mayors ==
- Jacques Macquin (1953-1971)
- Guy Sadaune (1971-1973)
- Maurice Koehl (1973-1983)
- Daniel Doussot (1983-1989)
- Dominique Blondel (1989-1994)
- Bernard Ménager (1994-1998)
- Hugues Rondeau (1998-2014)
- Chantal Brunel (2014-2016)
- Yann Dubosc (2016–Present)

== See also ==
- Communes of the Seine-et-Marne department
