= Chalifert Tunnel =

Canal tunnel in France

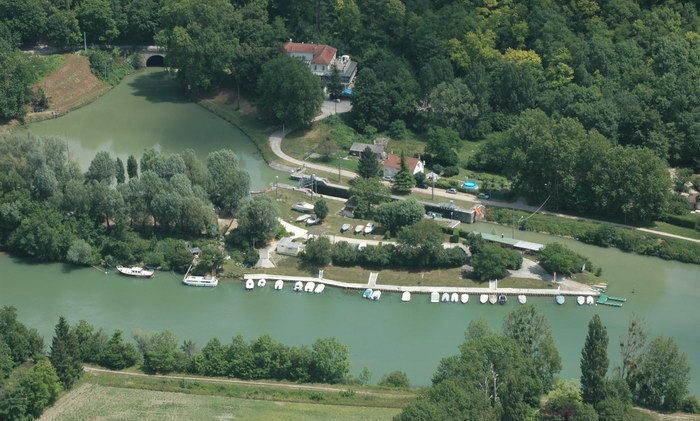
- The entrance of the tunnel with its sluice
- Interactive map of Chalifert Tunnel

Overview
- Location: Chalifert
- Coordinates: 48.883333°N 2.766667°E
- Waterway: Canal de Meaux à Chalifert

Operation
- Work began: 1837
- Opened: 1846

Technical
- Length: 300 m

Chalifert Tunnel is a canal tunnel located in the Canal de Meaux à Chalifert in the Marne river in the French region of Île-de-France (Department of Seine-et-Marne, Arrondissement of Torcy)

The canal tunnel is located between sluice 14 to Chalifert and sluice 13 to Coupray and has a length of 300 meters. The tunnel is well illuminated and is operated from the Marne.
