= Canton of Noisiel =

Coordinates: 48°50′45″N 2°37′46″E

Noisiel
- Former canton
- Interactive map of Noisiel
- Country: France
- Region: Île-de-France
- Department: Seine-et-Marne
- No. of communes: {{{nbcomm}}}
- Disbanded: 2015
- Area: 8.82 km^{2} (3.41 sq mi)
- Population (2012): 30,200
  - Density: 3,420/km^{2} (8,870/sq mi)

The canton of Noisiel is a French former administrative division, located in the arrondissement of Torcy, in the Seine-et-Marne département (Île-de-France région). It was disbanded following the French canton reorganisation which came into effect in March 2015. It consisted of 2 communes, which joined the canton of Champs-sur-Marne in 2015.

== Demographics ==
Historical population
Year	Pop.	±%
1999	29,717	—
2006	29,993	+0.9%
2012	30,200	+0.7%

== Composition ==
The canton of Noisiel was composed of 2 communes:

- Lognes
- Noisiel

== See also ==
- Cantons of the Seine-et-Marne department
- Communes of the Seine-et-Marne department
