= Communauté d'agglomération de Marne et Gondoire =

Coordinates: 48.85°N 2.69°E

Marne et Gondoire
- Communauté d'agglomération
- Country: France
- Region: Île-de-France
- Department: Seine-et-Marne
- No. of communes: {{{nbcomm}}}
- Established: 2001

Government
  - President: Michel Chartier
- Area: 105.03 km^{2} (40.55 sq mi)
- Population (2018): 106,750
  - Density: 1,016.4/km^{2} (2,632.4/sq mi)
- Website: www.marneetgondoire.fr

The Communauté d'agglomération de Marne et Gondoire is a communauté d'agglomération, an intercommunal structure, part of the Marne-la-Vallée new town, in the eastern suburbs of Paris. It is located in the Seine-et-Marne department, in the Île-de-France region, northern France. It was created in November 2001. In July 2017, it was expanded with the communes Ferrières-en-Brie and Pontcarré. Its seat is in Bussy-Saint-Martin. Its area is 105.0 km^{2}. Its population was 106,750 in 2018.

== Composition ==
The communauté d'agglomération consists of the following 20 communes:

1. Bussy-Saint-Georges
2. Bussy-Saint-Martin
3. Carnetin
4. Chalifert
5. Chanteloup-en-Brie
6. Collégien
7. Conches-sur-Gondoire
8. Dampmart
9. Ferrières-en-Brie
10. Gouvernes
11. Guermantes
12. Jablines
13. Jossigny
14. Lagny-sur-Marne
15. Lesches
16. Montévrain
17. Pomponne
18. Pontcarré
19. Saint-Thibault-des-Vignes
20. Thorigny-sur-Marne

== See also ==
- Communes of the Seine-et-Marne department
