= Guermantes =

- Commune
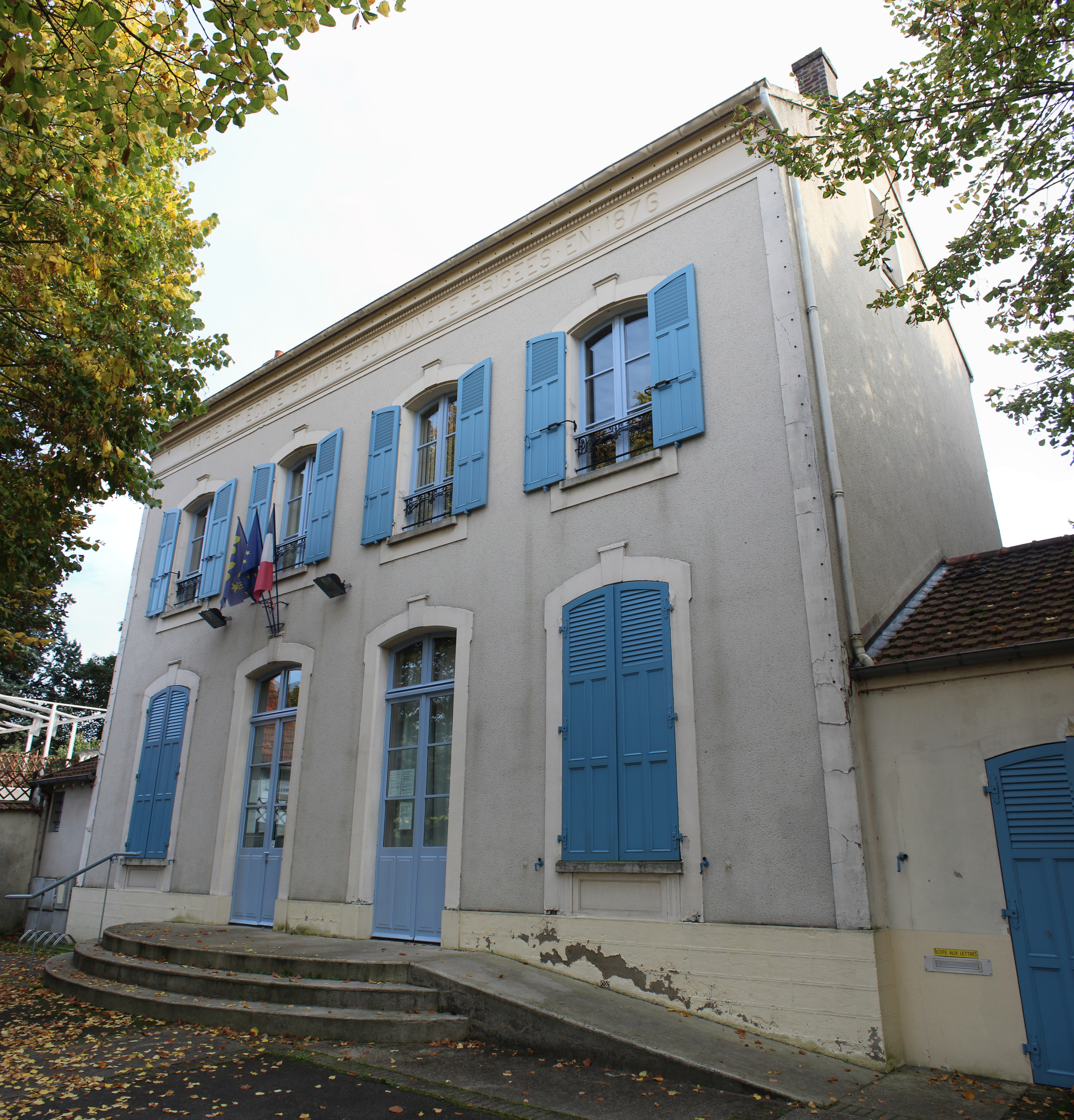
- The town hall in Guermantes
- Location of Guermantes
- Location within France Location within Île-de-France (region)
- Coordinates: 48°51′19″N 2°42′24″E
- Country: France
- Region: Île-de-France
- Department: Seine-et-Marne
- Arrondissement: Torcy
- Canton: Lagny-sur-Marne
- Intercommunality: Marne et Gondoire

Government
  - Mayor (2025–2026): Annie Viard
- Area^{1}: 1.26 km^{2} (0.49 sq mi)
- Highest elevation: 121 m (397 ft)
- Lowest elevation: 97 m (318 ft)
- Population (2023): 1,153
  - Density: 915/km^{2} (2,370/sq mi)
- Time zone: UTC+01:00 (CET)
  - Summer (DST): UTC+02:00 (CEST)
- INSEE/Postal code: 77221 /77600
- ^{1} French Land Register data, which excludes lakes, ponds, glaciers > 1 km^{2} (0.386 sq mi or 247 acres) and river estuaries.

Guermantes (French pronunciation: [ɡɛʁmɑ̃t]) is a commune in the Seine-et-Marne department in the Île-de-France region in north-central France. It is located in the Val de Bussy sector of Marne-la-Vallée. As of 2022, its population was 1,151.

Writer Marcel Proust adopted its name for the origin of the Guermantes family in À la recherche du temps perdu. Proust Scholar Joshua Landy points out that the only reason Proust "used it in his novel is that no living members of the family remained.”

== Demographics ==
Inhabitants are called Guermantais.

== Schools ==
The town has a preschool and an elementary school in a single school group. Junior high school students attend Collège Léonard de Vinci in Saint Thibault des Vignes.

Area senior high schools/sixth-form colleges:

- Lycée Martin Luther King in Bussy-Saint-Georges
- Lycée Emily Brontë in Lognes
- Lycée Jean Moulin in Torcy

== See also ==
- Communes of the Seine-et-Marne department
