= Canton of Roissy-en-Brie =

Coordinates: 48°47′24″N 2°40′45″E

Roissy-en-Brie
- Former canton
- Interactive map of Roissy-en-Brie
- Country: France
- Region: Île-de-France
- Department: Seine-et-Marne
- No. of communes: {{{nbcomm}}}
- Disbanded: 2015
- Area: 39.03 km^{2} (15.07 sq mi)
- Population (2012): 44,626
  - Density: 1,143/km^{2} (2,961/sq mi)

The canton of Roissy-en-Brie is a French former administrative division, located in the arrondissement of Torcy, in the Seine-et-Marne département (Île-de-France région). It was disbanded following the French canton reorganisation which came into effect in March 2015.

== Demographics ==
Historical population
Year	Pop.	±%
1999	42,216	—
2006	43,400	+2.8%
2012	44,626	+2.8%

== Composition ==
The canton of Roissy-en-Brie was composed of 3 communes:

- Ozoir-la-Ferrière
- Pontcarré
- Roissy-en-Brie

== See also ==
- Cantons of the Seine-et-Marne department
- Communes of the Seine-et-Marne department
