= Lagny-Pomponne rail accident =

1933 railway incident in France

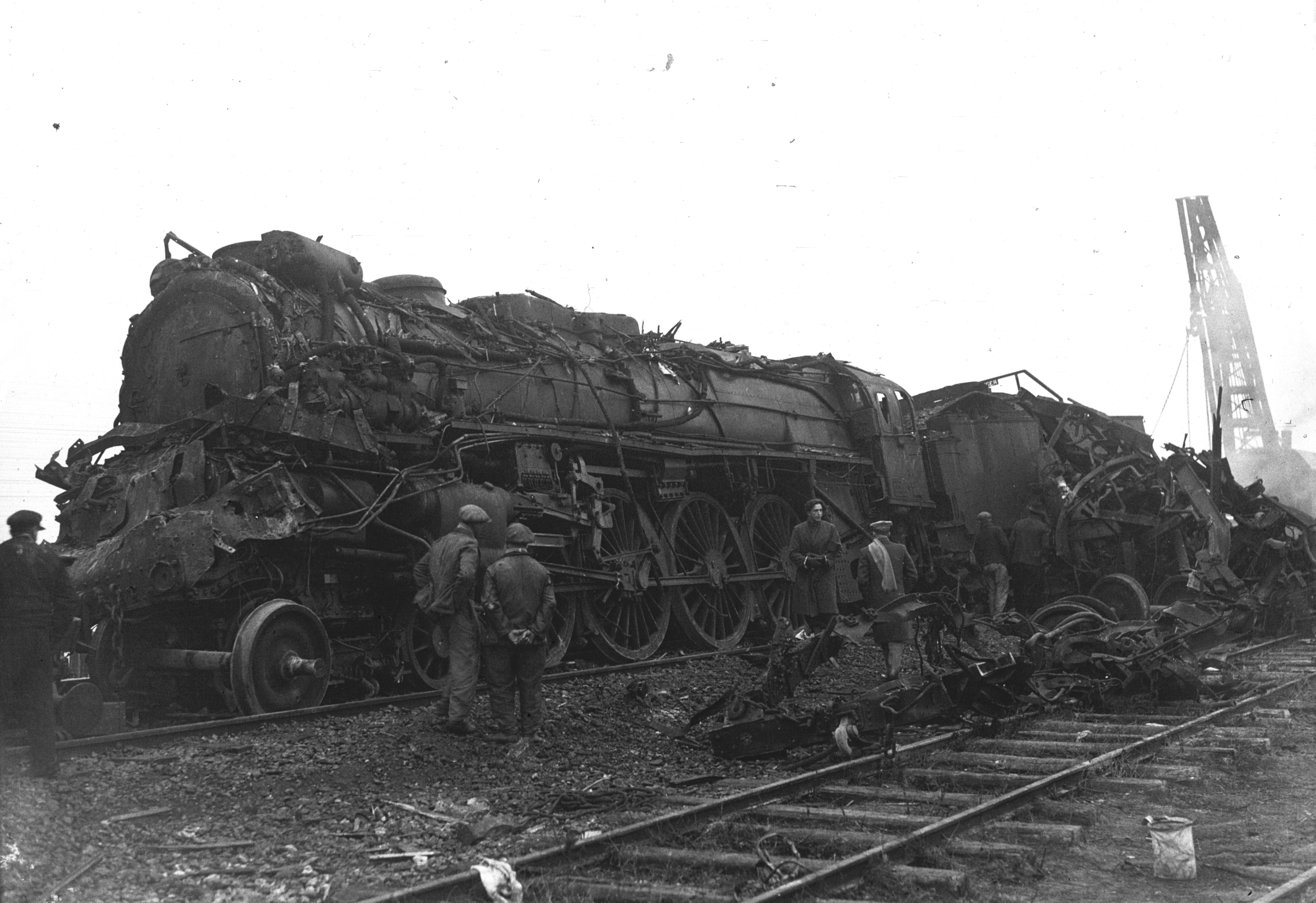
The locomotive after the accident

The Lagny-Pomponne rail accident occurred on 23 December 1933, between Pomponne and Lagny-sur-Marne (48°52′54″N 2°41′47″E), 20 kilometres (12 mi) east of Paris, when the 4-8-2 locomotive of the express for Strasbourg crashed at 110 km/h (65 mph) into the rear of an auxiliary train bound for Nancy, which was stopped on the railway. The impact crushed and splintered the last five cars of the Nancy train, older wooden cars pressed into service for the holidays. Both trains were full of people going home to their families for Christmas. 204 people died and 120 were injured.

It is the second to worst railway disaster in French history, after the 1917 Saint-Michel-de-Maurienne derailment.

== Sources ==
- 2006 Documentary by Granada Bristol for National Geographic Channel on railroad safety
