= Canton of Vaires-sur-Marne =

Coordinates: 48°52′47″N 2°37′23″E

Vaires-sur-Marne
- Former canton
- Interactive map of Vaires-sur-Marne
- Country: France
- Region: Île-de-France
- Department: Seine-et-Marne
- No. of communes: {{{nbcomm}}}
- Disbanded: 2015
- Area: 10.30 km^{2} (3.98 sq mi)
- Population (2012): 35,401
  - Density: 3,437/km^{2} (8,902/sq mi)

The canton of Vaires-sur-Marne is a French former administrative division, located in the arrondissement of Torcy, in the Seine-et-Marne département (Île-de-France région). It was disbanded following the French canton reorganisation which came into effect in March 2015.

== Demographics ==
Historical population
Year	Pop.	±%
1999	30,999	—
2006	31,443	+1.4%
2012	35,401	+12.6%

== Composition ==
The canton of Vaires-sur-Marne was composed of 2 communes, and part of a third commune:

- Brou-sur-Chantereine
- Chelles (partly)
- Vaires-sur-Marne

== See also ==
- Cantons of the Seine-et-Marne department
- Communes of the Seine-et-Marne department
