= Pomponne =

- Commune
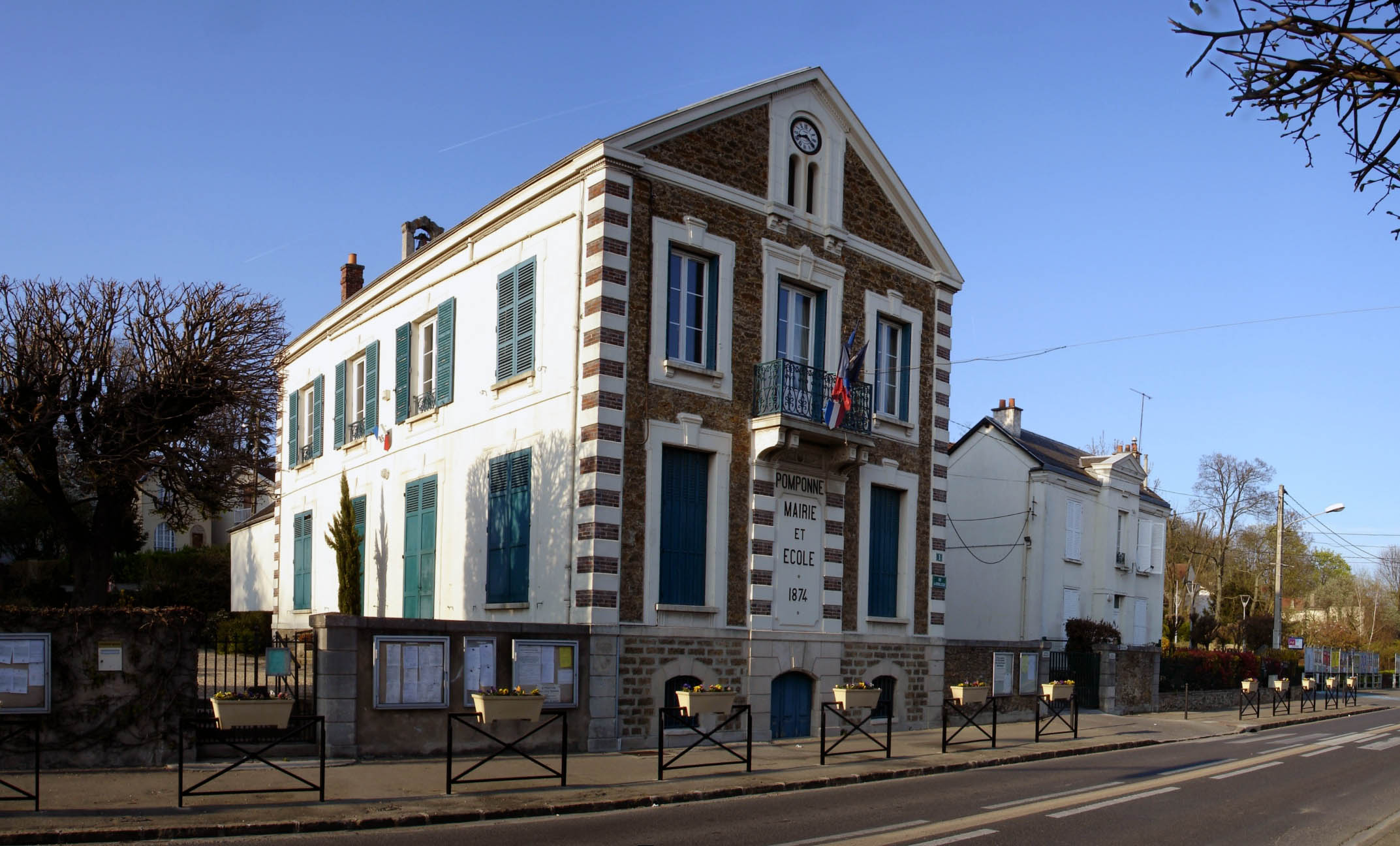
- The town hall of Pomponne

- Coat of arms

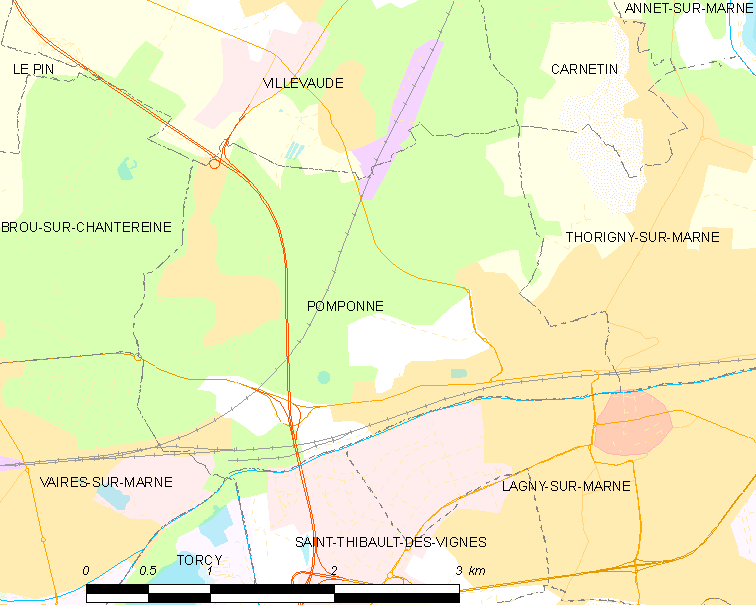
- Location of Pomponne
- Location within France Location within Île-de-France (region)
- Coordinates: 48°53′04″N 2°41′21″E
- Country: France
- Region: Île-de-France
- Department: Seine-et-Marne
- Arrondissement: Torcy
- Canton: Lagny-sur-Marne
- Intercommunality: Marne et Gondoire

Government
  - Mayor (2020–2026): Arnaud Brunet
- Area^{1}: 7.17 km^{2} (2.77 sq mi)
- Highest elevation: 120 m (390 ft)
- Lowest elevation: 37 m (121 ft)
- Population (2023): 4,215
  - Density: 588/km^{2} (1,520/sq mi)
- Time zone: UTC+01:00 (CET)
  - Summer (DST): UTC+02:00 (CEST)
- INSEE/Postal code: 77372 /77400
- ^{1} French Land Register data, which excludes lakes, ponds, glaciers > 1 km^{2} (0.386 sq mi or 247 acres) and river estuaries.

Pomponne (French pronunciation: [pɔ̃pɔn]) is a commune in the Seine-et-Marne department in the Île-de-France region in north-central France.

== Population ==
Historical population
Year	Pop.	±% p.a.
1968	1,304	—
1975	1,397	+0.99%
1982	2,826	+10.59%
1990	3,044	+0.93%
1999	3,256	+0.75%
2007	3,336	+0.30%
2012	3,579	+1.42%
2017	4,034	+2.42%
2023	4,215	+0.73%
Source: INSEE

The inhabitants are called Pomponnais in French.

== History ==
On 23 December 1933, the second worst train accident in France occurred in Pomponne with a rear-end collision of Paris-Nancy express and Paris-Strasbourg fast train. 230 people were killed and 300 injured aboard the Nancy express as its 7 wood coaches were smashed. The driver of the Strasbourg train had passed a signal at danger in darkness and fog, but the "Crocodile" acoustic warning system was found to have failed because the contacts had iced over.

== See also ==
- Communes of the Seine-et-Marne department
