= Canton of Lagny-sur-Marne =

Coordinates: 48°52′20″N 2°41′38″E

Lagny-sur-Marne
- Canton
- Country: France
- Region: Île-de-France
- Department: Seine-et-Marne
- No. of communes: {{{nbcomm}}}
- Area: 58.90 km^{2} (22.74 sq mi)
- Population (2023): 73,987
  - Density: 1,256/km^{2} (3,253/sq mi)
- INSEE code: 77 09

The canton of Lagny-sur-Marne is a French administrative division, located in the arrondissement of Torcy, in the Seine-et-Marne département (Île-de-France région).

== Demographics ==
Historical population
Year	Pop.	±% p.a.
2013	62,697	—
2018	69,534	+2.09%
Source: INSEE

== Composition ==
At the French canton reorganisation which came into effect in March 2015, the canton was expanded from 4 to 14 communes:

- Carnetin
- Chalifert
- Chanteloup-en-Brie
- Conches-sur-Gondoire
- Dampmart
- Gouvernes
- Guermantes
- Jablines
- Lagny-sur-Marne
- Lesches
- Montévrain
- Pomponne
- Saint-Thibault-des-Vignes
- Thorigny-sur-Marne

== See also ==
- Cantons of the Seine-et-Marne department
- Communes of the Seine-et-Marne department
