= Gouvernes =

- Commune
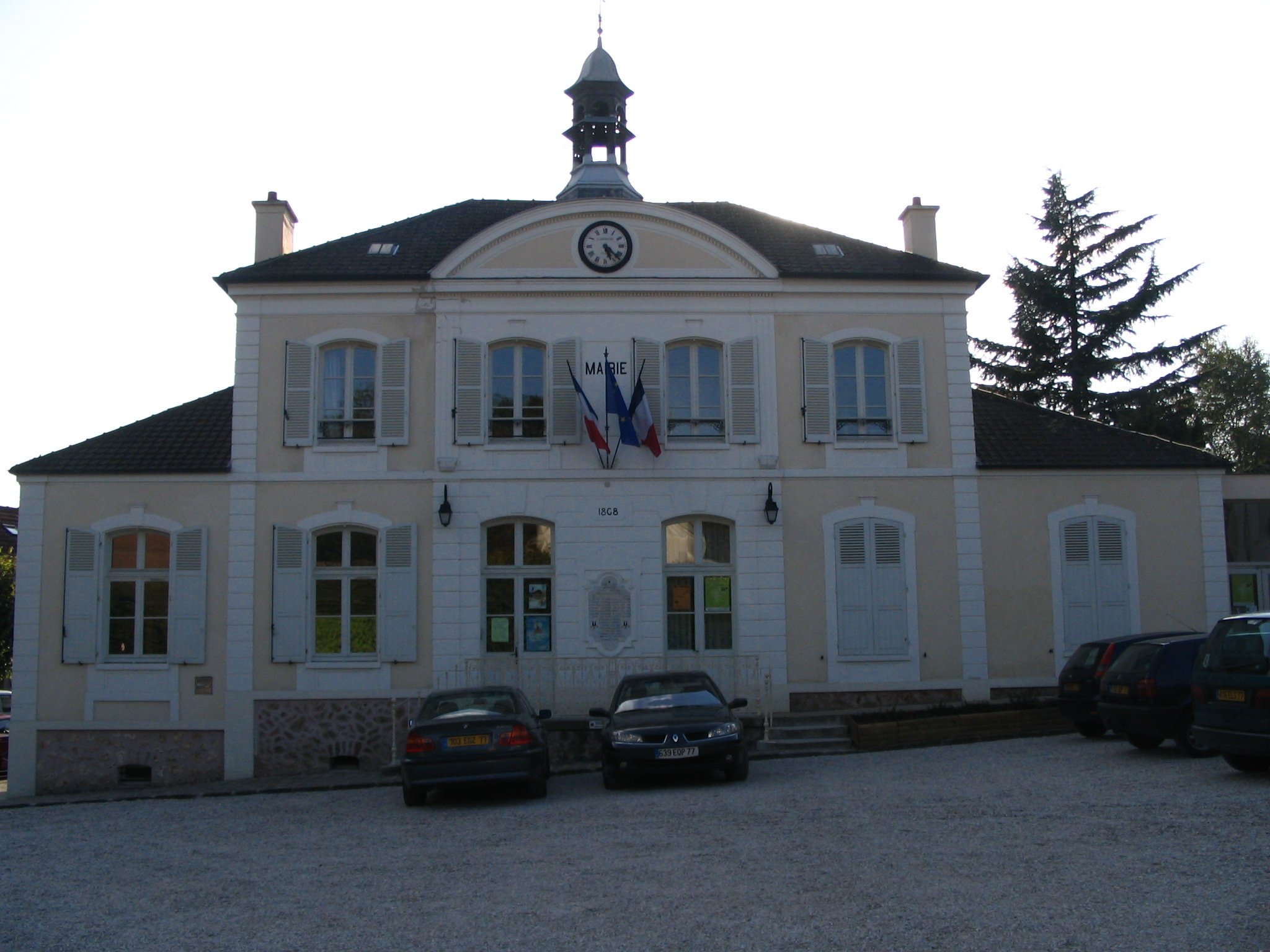
- The town hall in Gouvernes
- Location of Gouvernes
- Location within France Location within Île-de-France (region)
- Coordinates: 48°51′40″N 2°41′43″E
- Country: France
- Region: Île-de-France
- Department: Seine-et-Marne
- Arrondissement: Torcy
- Canton: Lagny-sur-Marne
- Intercommunality: Marne et Gondoire

Government
  - Mayor (2020–2026): Nathalie Tortrat
- Area^{1}: 2.72 km^{2} (1.05 sq mi)
- Highest elevation: 104 m (341 ft)
- Lowest elevation: 46 m (151 ft)
- Population (2023): 1,177
  - Density: 433/km^{2} (1,120/sq mi)
- Time zone: UTC+01:00 (CET)
  - Summer (DST): UTC+02:00 (CEST)
- INSEE/Postal code: 77209 /77400
- ^{1} French Land Register data, which excludes lakes, ponds, glaciers > 1 km^{2} (0.386 sq mi or 247 acres) and river estuaries.

Gouvernes (French pronunciation: [ɡuvɛʁn]) is a commune in the Seine-et-Marne department in the Île-de-France region in north-central France.

== Demographics ==
Inhabitants are called Gouverniauds.

== Education ==
The commune has a single municipal preschool and elementary school, as well as a library.

== See also ==
- Communes of the Seine-et-Marne department
