= Lesches, Seine-et-Marne =

Lesches
- Commune
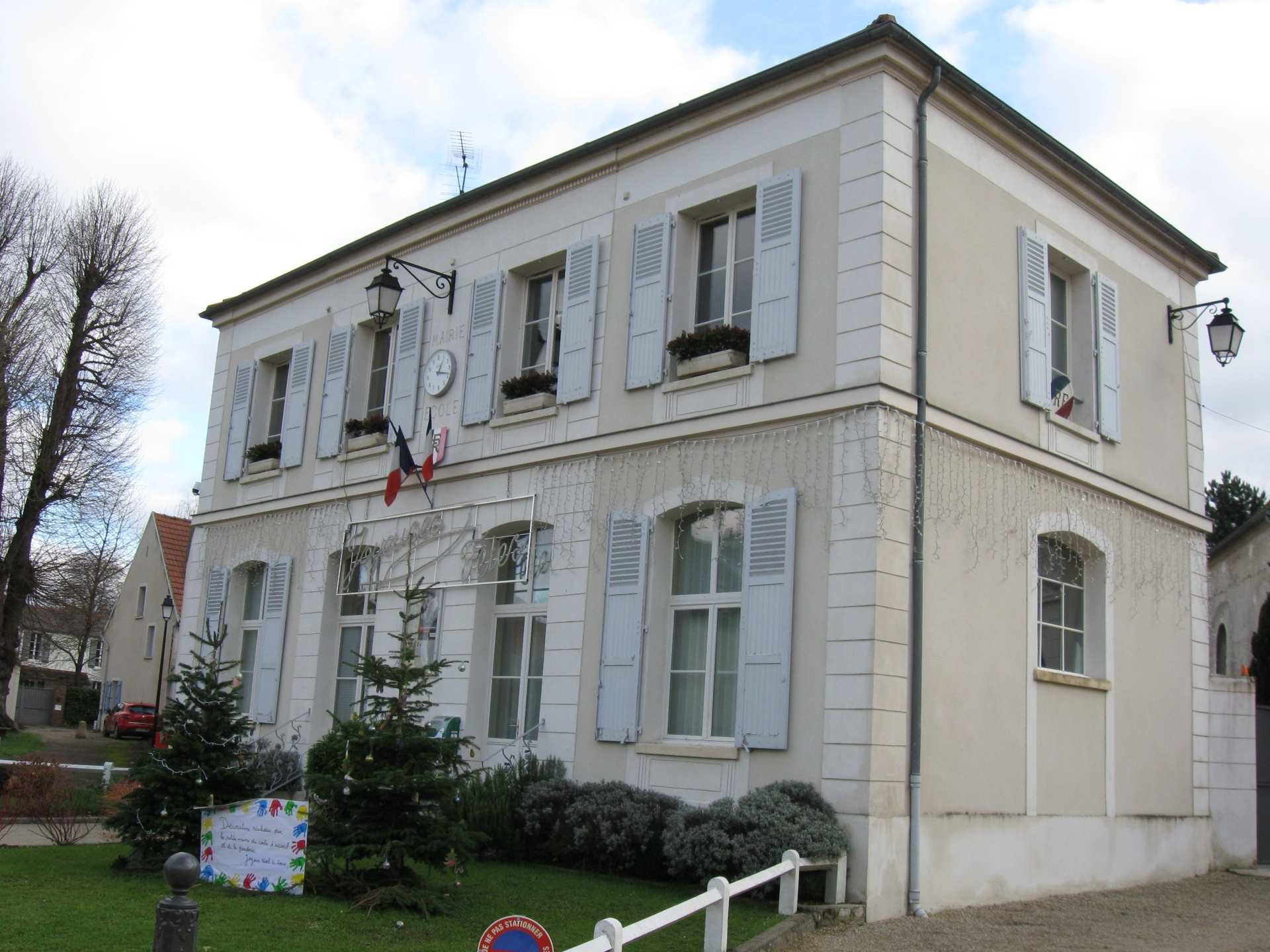
- The town hall in Lesches

- Coat of arms
- Location of Lesches
- Location within France Location within Île-de-France (region)
- Coordinates: 48°54′27″N 2°46′45″E
- Country: France
- Region: Île-de-France
- Department: Seine-et-Marne
- Arrondissement: Torcy
- Canton: Lagny-sur-Marne
- Intercommunality: Marne et Gondoire

Government
  - Mayor (2020–2026): Christine Gibert
- Area^{1}: 4.03 km^{2} (1.56 sq mi)
- Highest elevation: 107 m (351 ft)
- Lowest elevation: 40 m (130 ft)
- Population (2023): 763
  - Density: 189/km^{2} (490/sq mi)
- Time zone: UTC+01:00 (CET)
  - Summer (DST): UTC+02:00 (CEST)
- INSEE/Postal code: 77248 /77450
- ^{1} French Land Register data, which excludes lakes, ponds, glaciers > 1 km^{2} (0.386 sq mi or 247 acres) and river estuaries.

Lesches (French pronunciation: [lɛʃ]) is a commune in the Seine-et-Marne department in the Île-de-France region in north-central France.

== Demographics ==
The inhabitants are called the Leschois.

== See also ==
- Communes of the Seine-et-Marne department
