= Dampmart =

- Commune
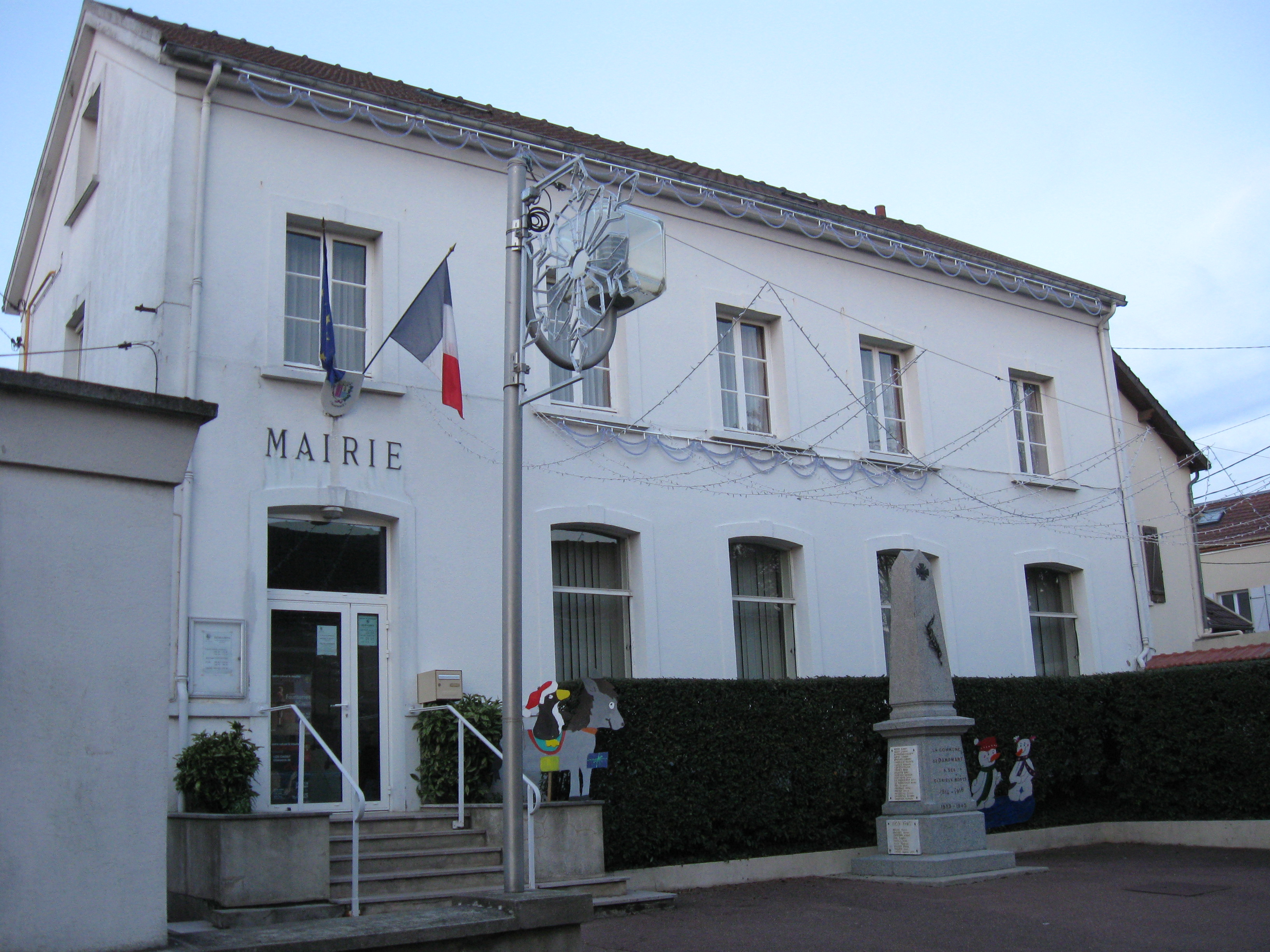
- The town hall of Dampmart

- Coat of arms

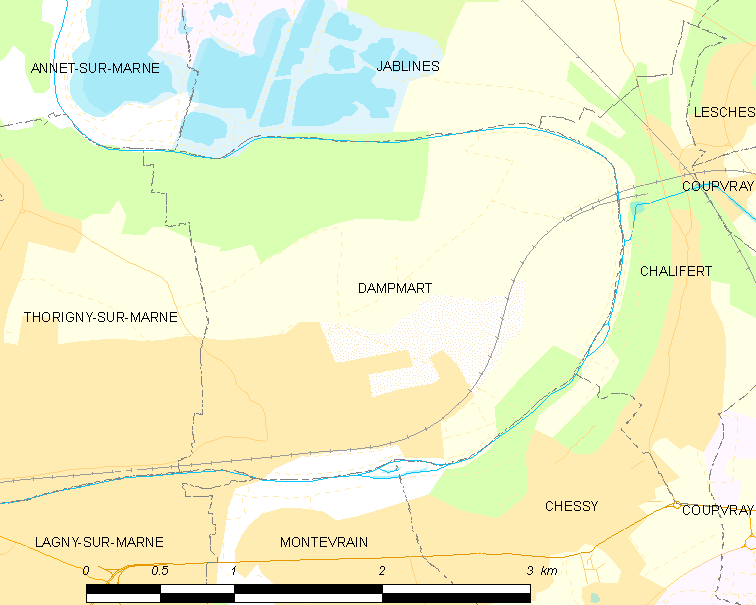
- Location of Dampmart
- Location within France Location within Île-de-France (region)
- Coordinates: 48°53′07″N 2°44′10″E
- Country: France
- Region: Île-de-France
- Department: Seine-et-Marne
- Arrondissement: Torcy
- Canton: Lagny-sur-Marne
- Intercommunality: Marne et Gondoire

Government
  - Mayor (2020–2026): Laurent Delpech
- Area^{1}: 5.92 km^{2} (2.29 sq mi)
- Highest elevation: 124 m (407 ft)
- Lowest elevation: 38 m (125 ft)
- Population (2023): 3,677
  - Density: 621/km^{2} (1,610/sq mi)
- Time zone: UTC+01:00 (CET)
  - Summer (DST): UTC+02:00 (CEST)
- INSEE/Postal code: 77155 /77400
- ^{1} French Land Register data, which excludes lakes, ponds, glaciers > 1 km^{2} (0.386 sq mi or 247 acres) and river estuaries.

Dampmart (French: [dɑ̃maʁ]) is a commune in the Seine-et-Marne department in the Île-de-France region in north-central France.

== Population ==
Historical population
Year	Pop.	±% p.a.
1968	1,243	—
1975	1,963	+6.75%
1982	2,390	+2.85%
1990	2,693	+1.50%
1999	2,754	+0.25%
2007	3,092	+1.46%
2012	3,179	+0.56%
2017	3,375	+1.20%
2023	3,677	+1.44%
Source: INSEE

Inhabitants of Dampmart are called Dampmartois in French.

== See also ==
- Communes of the Seine-et-Marne department
