= Jablines =

- Commune
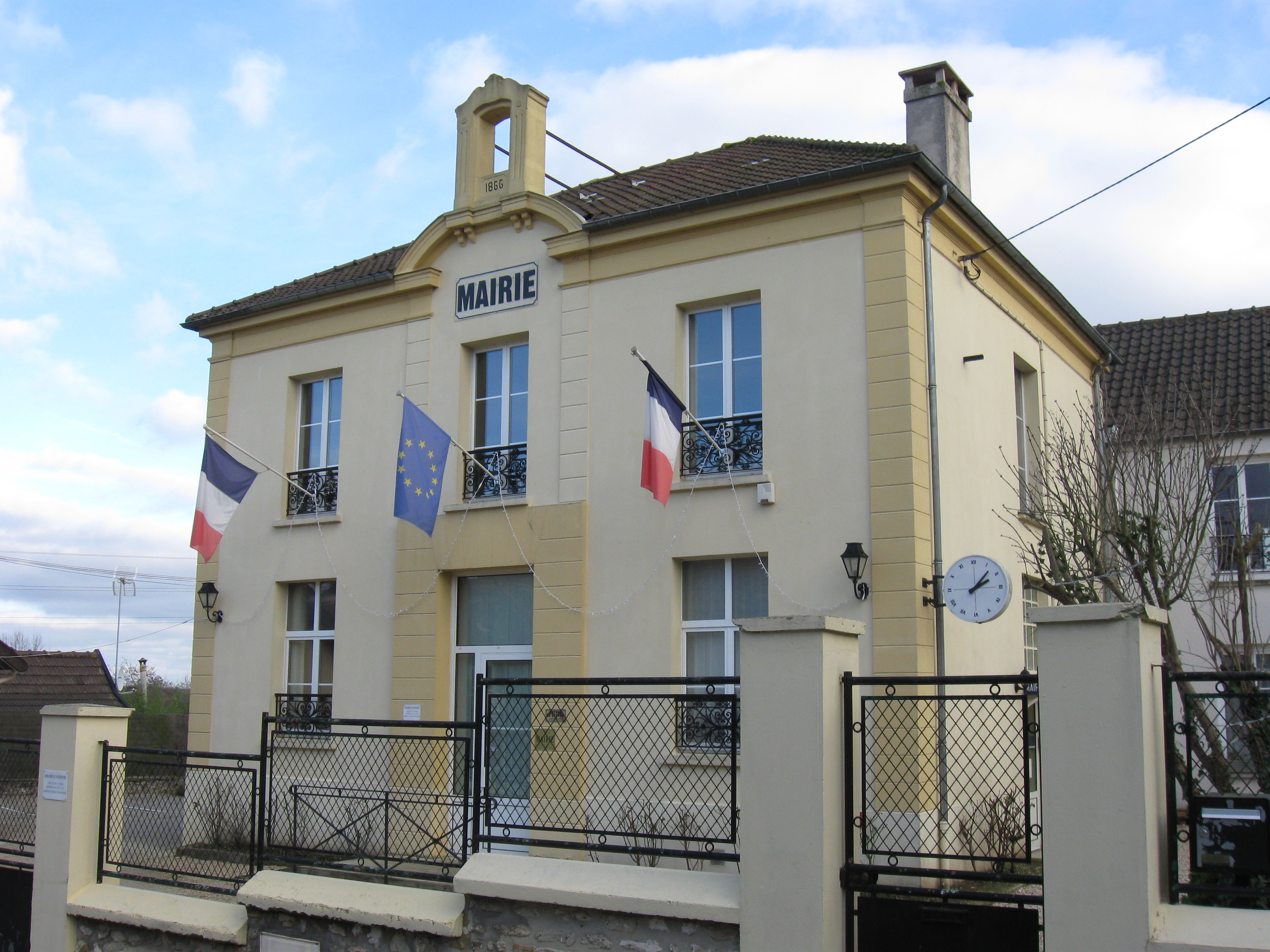
- The town hall of Jablines

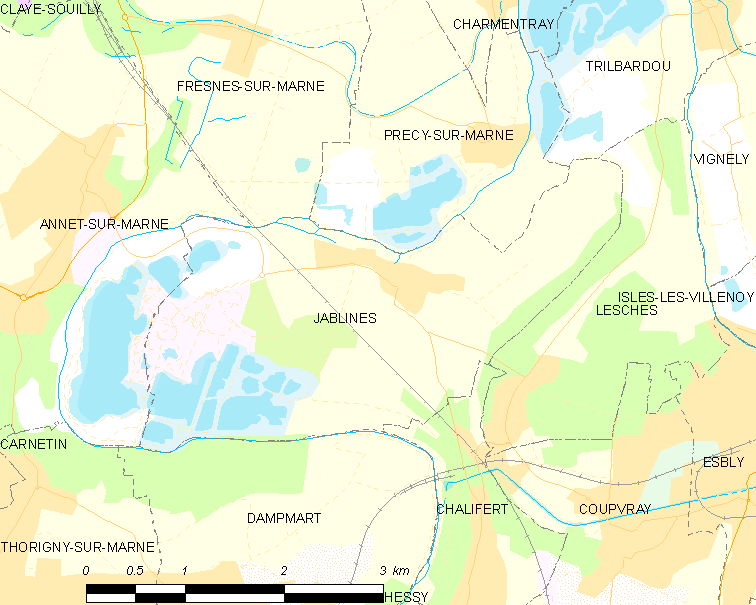
- Location of Jablines
- Location within France Location within Île-de-France (region)
- Coordinates: 48°55′01″N 2°45′43″E
- Country: France
- Region: Île-de-France
- Department: Seine-et-Marne
- Arrondissement: Torcy
- Canton: Lagny-sur-Marne
- Intercommunality: Marne et Gondoire

Government
  - Mayor (2020–2026): Jean-Michel Barat
- Area^{1}: 8.04 km^{2} (3.10 sq mi)
- Highest elevation: 78 m (256 ft)
- Lowest elevation: 37 m (121 ft)
- Population (2023): 647
  - Density: 80.5/km^{2} (208/sq mi)
- Time zone: UTC+01:00 (CET)
  - Summer (DST): UTC+02:00 (CEST)
- INSEE/Postal code: 77234 /77450
- ^{1} French Land Register data, which excludes lakes, ponds, glaciers > 1 km^{2} (0.386 sq mi or 247 acres) and river estuaries.

Jablines (French: [ʒablin]) is a commune in the Seine-et-Marne department in the Île-de-France region in north-central France.

== Demographics ==
Inhabitants are called Jablinois in French.

Historical population
Year	Pop.	±% p.a.
1968	288	—
1975	260	−1.45%
1982	260	+0.00%
1990	333	+3.14%
1999	574	+6.24%
2007	628	+1.13%
2012	660	+1.00%
2017	686	+0.78%
2023	647	−0.97%
Source: INSEE

== See also ==
- Communes of the Seine-et-Marne department
