= Arrondissement of Torcy =

Coordinates: 48°51′04″N 2°38′59″E

Torcy
- Arrondissement
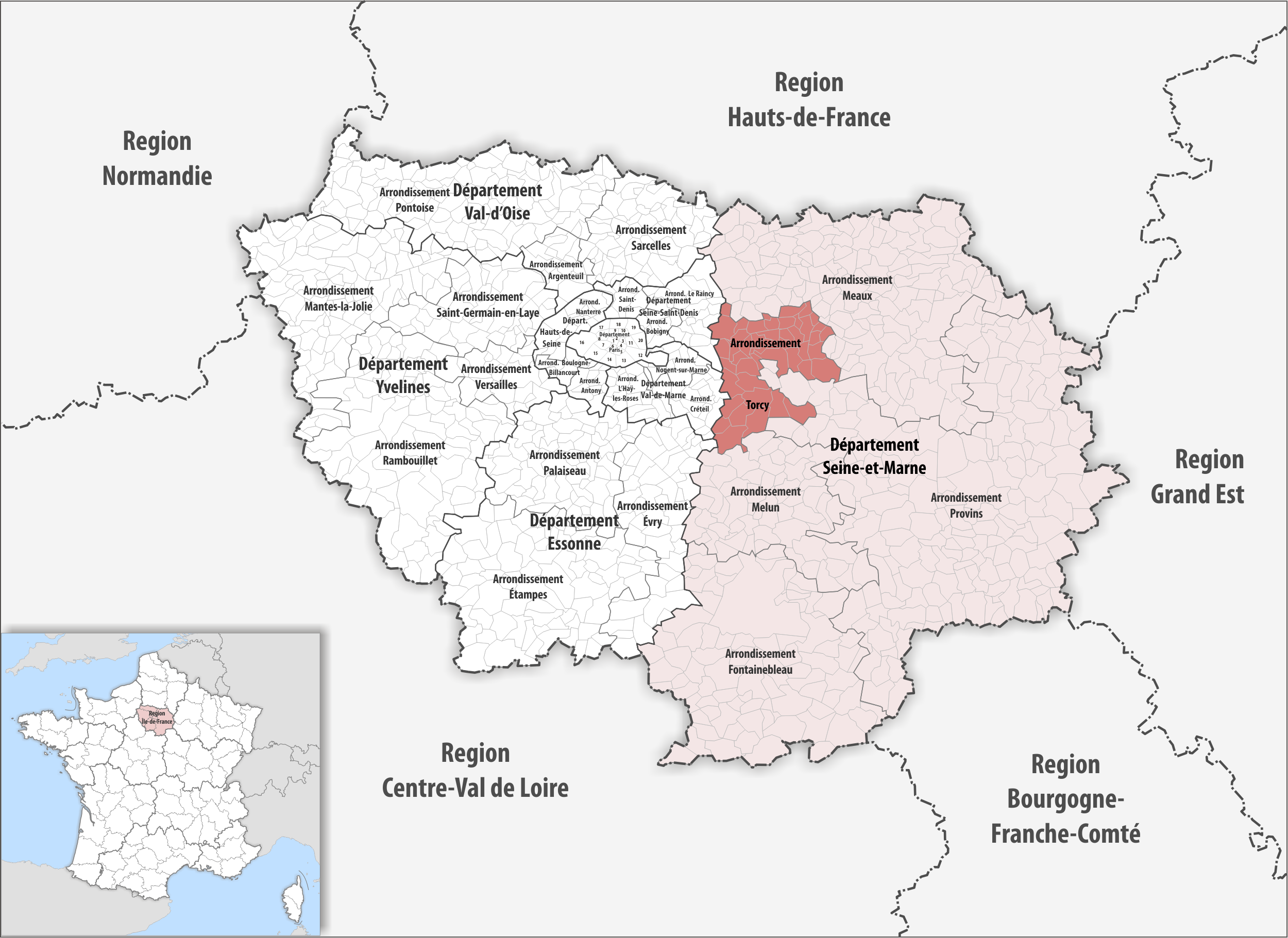
- Location within the region Île-de-France
- Country: France
- Region: Île-de-France
- Department: Seine-et-Marne
- No. of communes: {{{nbcomm}}}
- Area: 382.5 km^{2} (147.7 sq mi)
- Population (2023): 474,307
  - Density: 1,240/km^{2} (3,212/sq mi)
- INSEE code: 775

The arrondissement of Torcy is an arrondissement of France in the Seine-et-Marne department in the Île-de-France region. It has 50 communes. Its population is 462,852 (2021), and its area is 382.5 km^{2} (147.7 sq mi).

== Composition ==
The communes of the arrondissement of Torcy, and their INSEE codes, are:

1. Bailly-Romainvilliers (77018)
2. Brie-Comte-Robert (77053)
3. Brou-sur-Chantereine (77055)
4. Bussy-Saint-Georges (77058)
5. Bussy-Saint-Martin (77059)
6. Carnetin (77062)
7. Chalifert (77075)
8. Champs-sur-Marne (77083)
9. Chanteloup-en-Brie (77085)
10. Chelles (77108)
11. Chessy (77111)
12. Chevry-Cossigny (77114)
13. Collégien (77121)
14. Conches-sur-Gondoire (77124)
15. Coupvray (77132)
16. Courtry (77139)
17. Croissy-Beaubourg (77146)
18. Dampmart (77155)
19. Émerainville (77169)
20. Esbly (77171)
21. Férolles-Attilly (77180)
22. Ferrières-en-Brie (77181)
23. Gouvernes (77209)
24. Gretz-Armainvilliers (77215)
25. Guermantes (77221)
26. Jablines (77234)
27. Jossigny (77237)
28. Lagny-sur-Marne (77243)
29. Lesches (77248)
30. Lésigny (77249)
31. Lognes (77258)
32. Magny-le-Hongre (77268)
33. Montévrain (77307)
34. Montry (77315)
35. Noisiel (77337)
36. Ozoir-la-Ferrière (77350)
37. Pomponne (77372)
38. Pontault-Combault (77373)
39. Pontcarré (77374)
40. Roissy-en-Brie (77390)
41. Saint-Germain-sur-Morin (77413)
42. Saint-Thibault-des-Vignes (77438)
43. Serris (77449)
44. Servon (77450)
45. Thorigny-sur-Marne (77464)
46. Torcy (77468)
47. Tournan-en-Brie (77470)
48. Vaires-sur-Marne (77479)
49. Villeneuve-le-Comte (77508)
50. Villeneuve-Saint-Denis (77510)

== History ==
In February 1993 the arrondissement of Noisiel was created from parts of the arrondissements of Melun (cantons of Roissy-en-Brie and Pontault-Combault) and Meaux (cantons of Claye-Souilly, Lagny-sur-Marne, Torcy, Vaires-sur-Marne, Champs-sur-Marne and Noisiel). Torcy replaced Noisiel as subprefecture in April 1994. At the January 2017 reorganisation of the arrondissements of Seine-et-Marne, it received seven communes from the arrondissement of Melun, and it lost five communes to the arrondissement of Meaux and two communes to the arrondissement of Provins. In December 2017 the communes Ferrières-en-Brie and Pontcarré passed from the arrondissement of Provins to the arrondissement of Torcy. In August 2018 the communes Villeneuve-le-Comte and Villeneuve-Saint-Denis passed from the arrondissement of Provins to the arrondissement of Torcy. In December 2019 the communes Esbly, Montry and Saint-Germain-sur-Morin passed from the arrondissement of Meaux to the arrondissement of Torcy.

As a result of the reorganisation of the cantons of France which came into effect in 2015, the borders of the cantons are no longer related to the borders of the arrondissements. The cantons of the arrondissement of Torcy were, as of January 2015:

1. Champs-sur-Marne
2. Chelles
3. Claye-Souilly
4. Lagny-sur-Marne
5. Noisiel
6. Pontault-Combault
7. Roissy-en-Brie
8. Thorigny-sur-Marne
9. Torcy
10. Vaires-sur-Marne
