= Montévrain =

- Commune
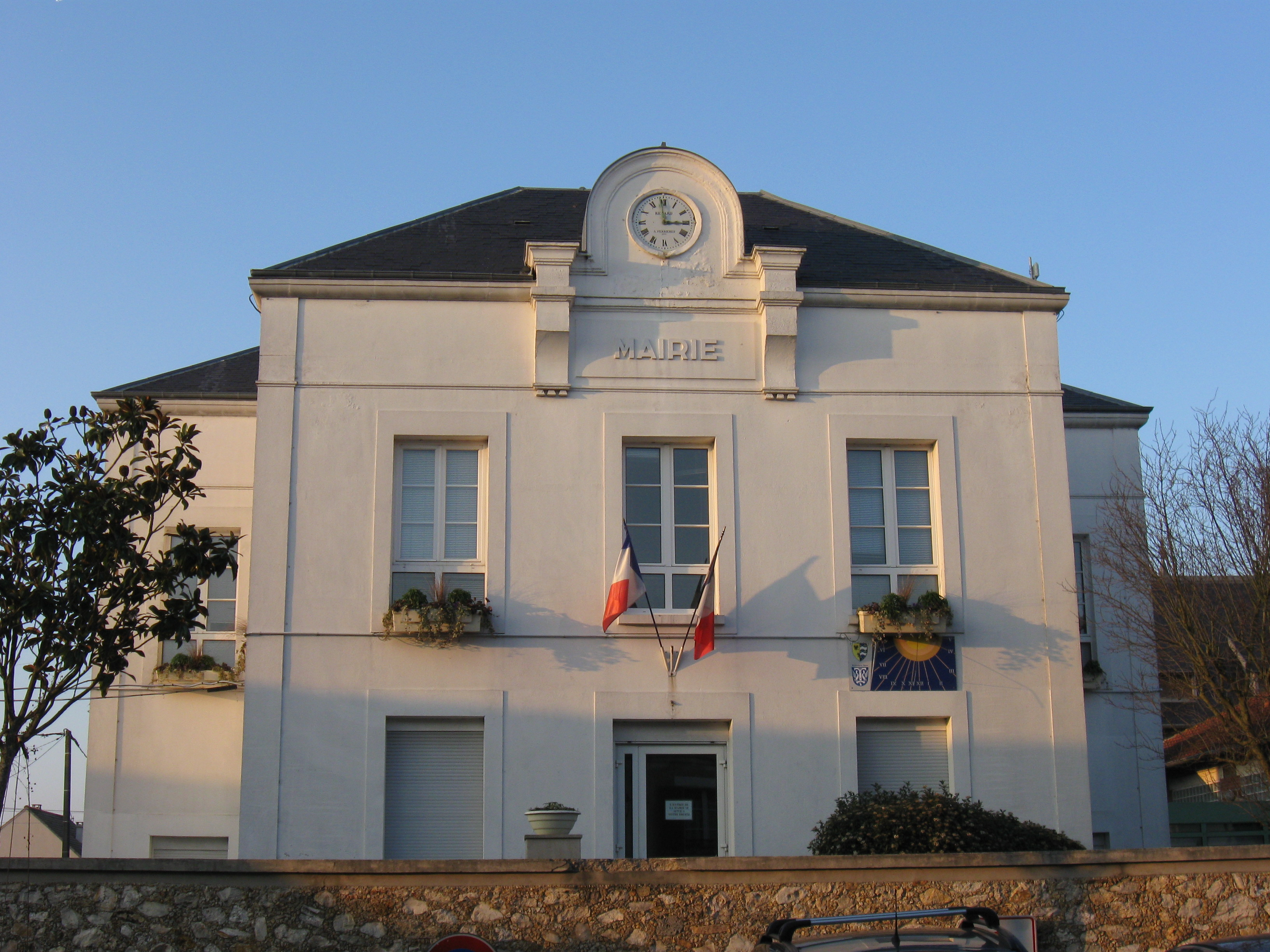
- The town hall in Montévrain

- Coat of arms
- Location of Montévrain
- Location within France Location within Île-de-France (region)
- Coordinates: 48°52′30″N 2°44′44″E
- Country: France
- Region: Île-de-France
- Department: Seine-et-Marne
- Arrondissement: Torcy
- Canton: Lagny-sur-Marne
- Intercommunality: CA Marne et Gondoire

Government
  - Mayor (2020–2026): Christian Robache
- Area^{1}: 5.45 km^{2} (2.10 sq mi)
- Highest elevation: 128 m (420 ft)
- Lowest elevation: 38 m (125 ft)
- Population (2023): 15,687
  - Density: 2,880/km^{2} (7,450/sq mi)
- Time zone: UTC+01:00 (CET)
  - Summer (DST): UTC+02:00 (CEST)
- INSEE/Postal code: 77307 /77144
- ^{1} French Land Register data, which excludes lakes, ponds, glaciers > 1 km^{2} (0.386 sq mi or 247 acres) and river estuaries.

Montévrain (French: [mɔ̃tevʁɛ̃]) is a commune in the Seine-et-Marne department in the Île-de-France region in north-central France.

== Demographics ==
Inhabitants are known as Montévrinois in French.

Historical population
Year	Pop.	±% p.a.
1968	1,031	—
1975	1,091	+0.81%
1982	1,147	+0.72%
1990	1,794	+5.75%
1999	3,149	+6.45%
2007	5,509	+7.24%
2012	9,225	+10.86%
2017	11,563	+4.62%
2023	15,687	+5.22%
Source: INSEE

== Education ==
The commune has the following school groups (combined preschool and elementary schools): Groupe scolaire Le Verger, Groupe Scolaire Le Puits du Gué, Groupe scolaire Eugène Isabey, and Groupe scolaire Louis de Vion.

The commune is developing its own junior high school scheduled to open in fall 2018. In the meantime junior high school students are sent to either Collège du Vieux Chene in Chessy or the collège provisoire in Serris.

Area senior high schools/sixth-form colleges:

- Lycée Van Dongen - Lagny-sur-Marne
- Lycée Emilie du Chatelet - Serris
- Lycée Auguste Perdonnnet - Thorigny-sur-Marne

== See also ==
- Communes of the Seine-et-Marne department
