= Conches-sur-Gondoire =

- Commune
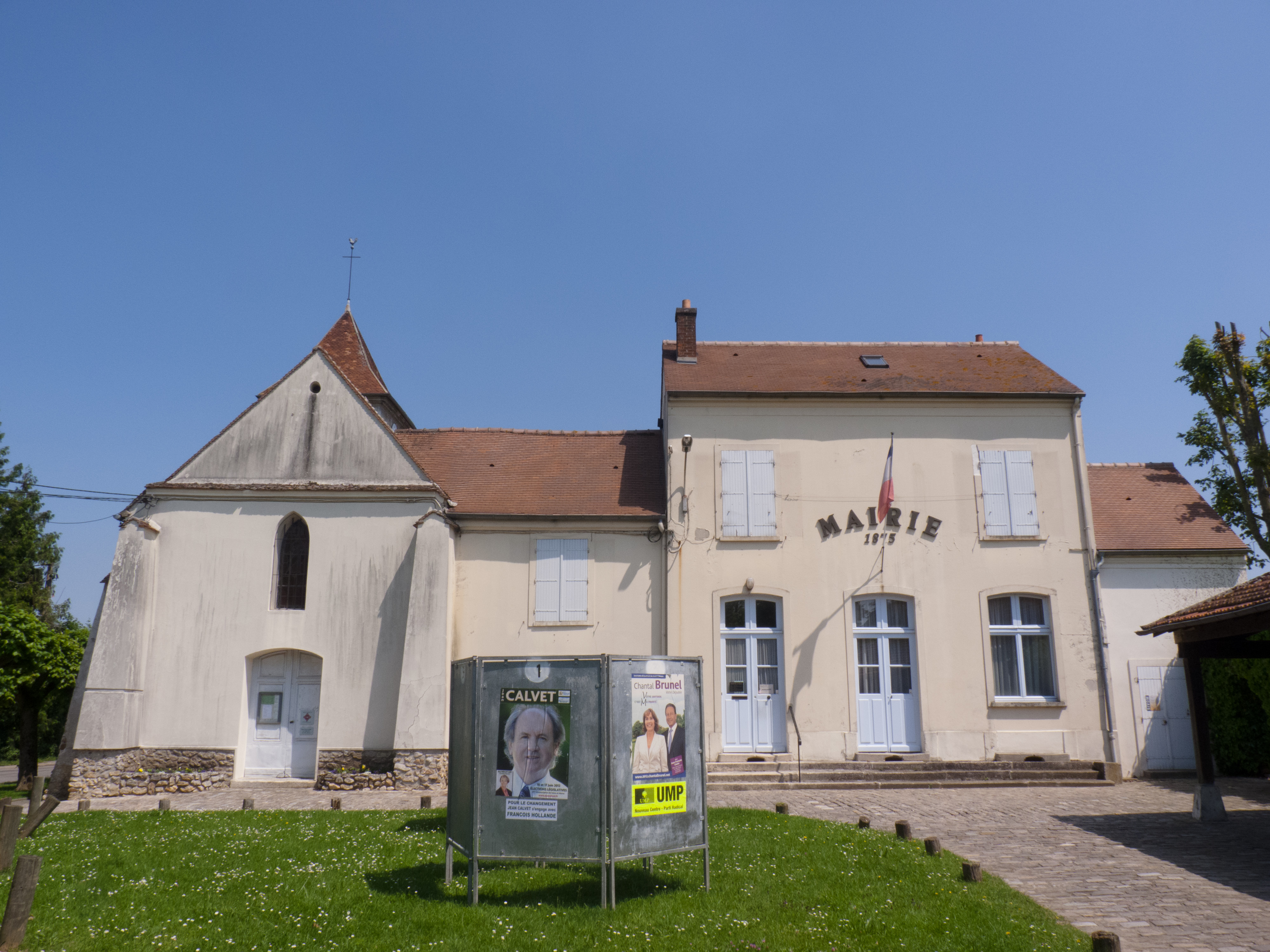
- The town hall and church in Conches-sur-Gondoire
- Location of Conches-sur-Gondoire
- Location within France Location within Île-de-France (region)
- Coordinates: 48°51′21″N 2°42′55″E
- Country: France
- Region: Île-de-France
- Department: Seine-et-Marne
- Arrondissement: Torcy
- Canton: Lagny-sur-Marne
- Intercommunality: CA Marne et Gondoire

Government
  - Mayor (2020–2026): Martine Daguerre
- Area^{1}: 1.52 km^{2} (0.59 sq mi)
- Highest elevation: 111 m (364 ft)
- Lowest elevation: 69 m (226 ft)
- Population (2023): 1,761
  - Density: 1,160/km^{2} (3,000/sq mi)
- Time zone: UTC+01:00 (CET)
  - Summer (DST): UTC+02:00 (CEST)
- INSEE/Postal code: 77124 /77600
- ^{1} French Land Register data, which excludes lakes, ponds, glaciers > 1 km^{2} (0.386 sq mi or 247 acres) and river estuaries.

Conches-sur-Gondoire (French pronunciation: [kɔ̃ːʃ syʁ ɡɔ̃dwaːʁ]) is a commune on the Gondoire river in Brie, in the Seine-et-Marne department in the Île-de-France region in north-central France. It is roughly 13 miles (21 km) from Paris.

Its remarkable sights include a monastery church of the 12th century, and a Second Empire castle built by Tranh Pharand Marcotte.

Until 1993, Conches-sur-Gondoire was simply called Conches. The name of the river was added to distinguish it from Conches-en-Ouche in Normandy (Eure department).

== History ==
During the middle-ages, Conches-sur-Gondoire consisted of a monastery located on the top of a slope, but during the so-called "Wars of Religion" of the 16th century, the closter and the conventual buildings were destroyed by a troop of Protestant soldiers. Nowadays remain the church (13th century), a Gothic cellar with column and capital, a square pond faced with stones, tombs and peasant cottages. The valley meadows and fields have not been approved for development.

During the Second Empire, 19th century, the castle of Conches was built near the church. It is surrounded by a 32-acre (130,000 m^{2}) park with a round pool and high trees (sequoias, cedars, plane trees). In Conches-sur-Gondoire, one of the remaining houses of the monastery belongs to French painter Maurice Boitel, who made numerous pictures in this village during the second half of the 20th century. During the sixties, his house was the meeting place for many painters, scientists, and musicians, including; Gabriel Deschamps, Pierre Gaillardot, Pierre Dejean, Maurice Faustino-Lafetat, Louis Vuillermoz, Albert Besson, Daniel du Janerand, and Françoise Ardré.

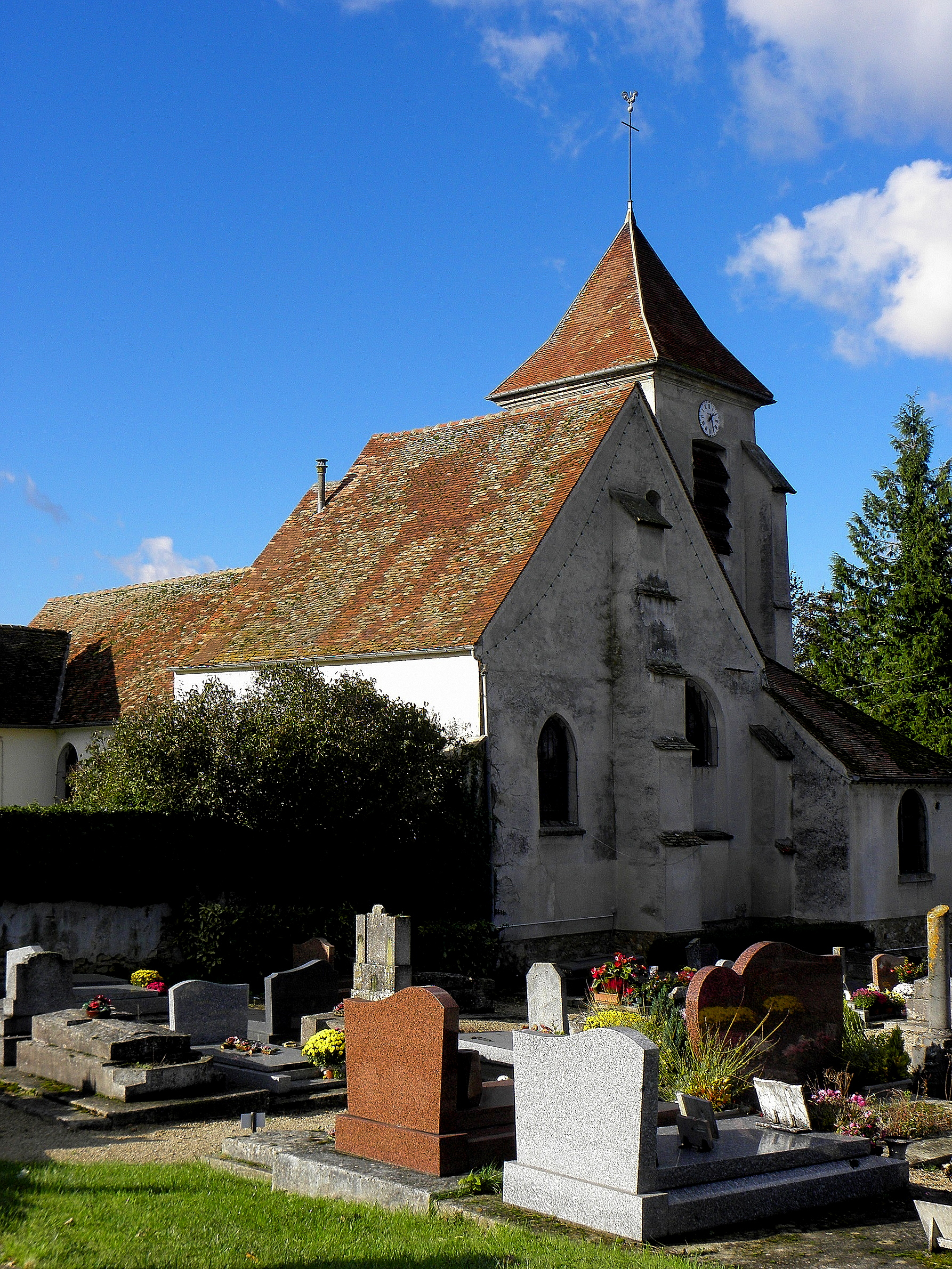
Église Notre-Dame-de-l'Assomption de Conches-sur-Gondoire

== Demographics ==
The inhabitants are called Conchois.

== Education ==
Schools serving the commune:

- Ecole Gustave Ribaud
- Ecole Val Guermantes (preschool and elementary school)
- Collège Léonard de Vinci in Saint-Thibault-des-Vignes

== See also ==
- Communes of the Seine-et-Marne department
