= Carnetin =

- Commune
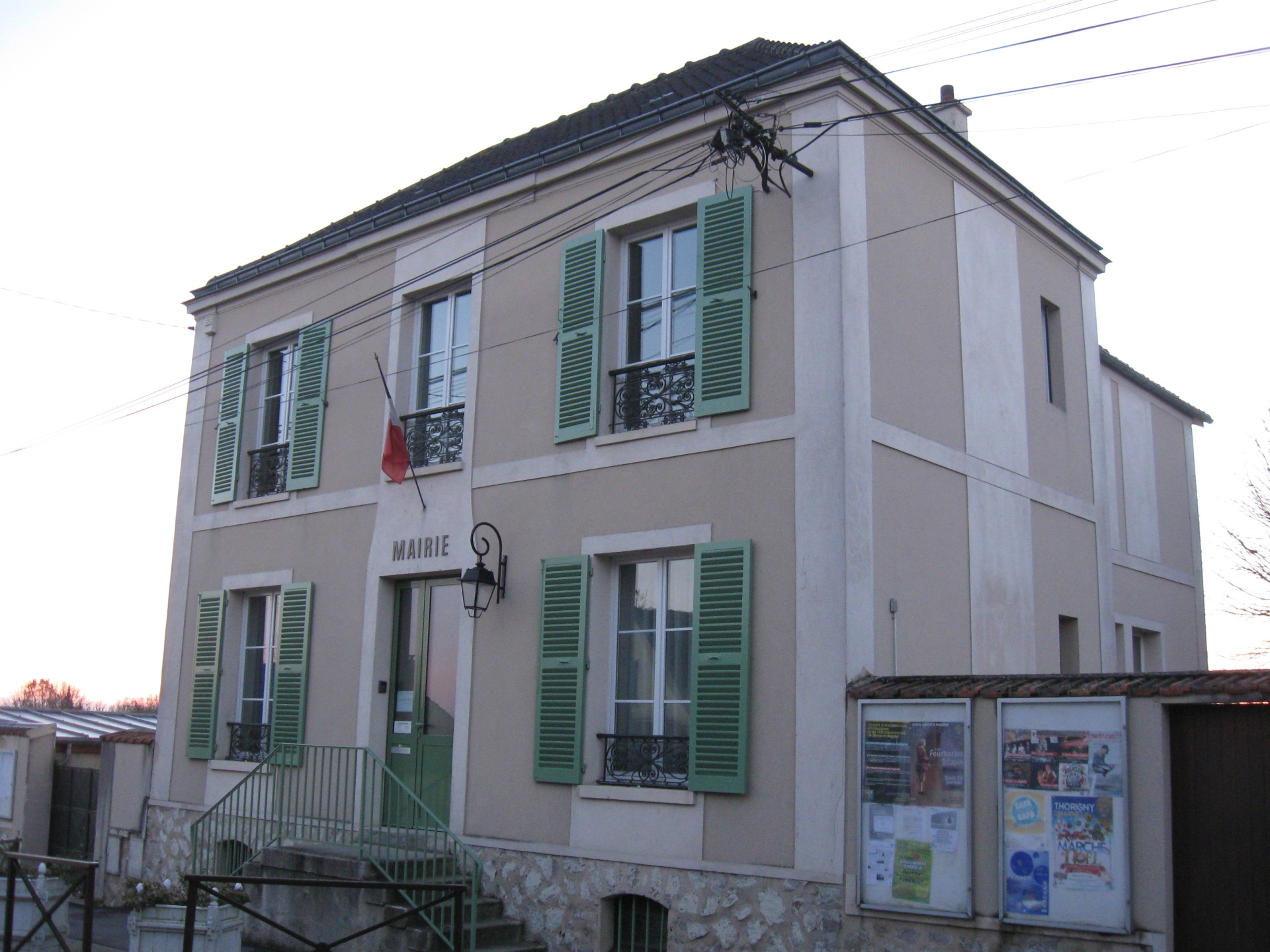
- The town hall in Carnetin
- Location of Carnetin
- Location within France Location within Île-de-France (region)
- Coordinates: 48°54′04″N 2°42′20″E
- Country: France
- Region: Île-de-France
- Department: Seine-et-Marne
- Arrondissement: Torcy
- Canton: Lagny-sur-Marne
- Intercommunality: CA Marne et Gondoire

Government
  - Mayor (2020–2026): Pascal Leroy
- Area^{1}: 1.61 km^{2} (0.62 sq mi)
- Highest elevation: 130 m (430 ft)
- Lowest elevation: 75 m (246 ft)
- Population (2023): 461
  - Density: 286/km^{2} (742/sq mi)
- Time zone: UTC+01:00 (CET)
  - Summer (DST): UTC+02:00 (CEST)
- INSEE/Postal code: 77062 /77400
- ^{1} French Land Register data, which excludes lakes, ponds, glaciers > 1 km^{2} (0.386 sq mi or 247 acres) and river estuaries.

Carnetin (French pronunciation: [kaʁnətɛ̃]) is a commune in the Seine-et-Marne department in the Île-de-France region in north-central France.

== Demographics ==
The inhabitants are called Carnetinois.

== See also ==
- Communes of the Seine-et-Marne department
