= Pontcarré =

- Commune
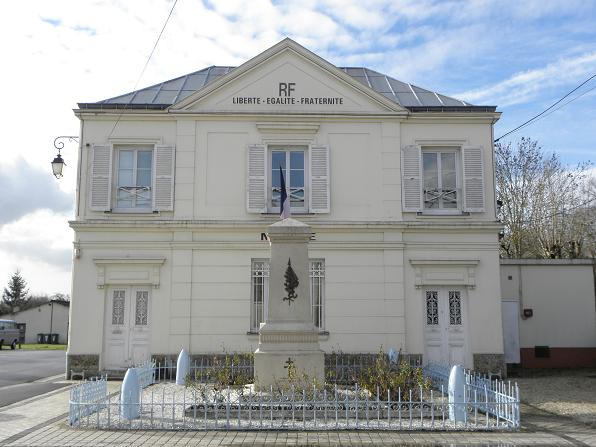
- The town hall in Pontcarré

- Coat of arms
- Location of Pontcarré
- Location within France Location within Île-de-France (region)
- Coordinates: 48°48′N 2°45′E
- Country: France
- Region: Île-de-France
- Department: Seine-et-Marne
- Arrondissement: Torcy
- Canton: Ozoir-la-Ferrière
- Intercommunality: CA Marne et Gondoire

Government
  - Mayor (2020–2026): Tony Salvaggio
- Area^{1}: 9.46 km^{2} (3.65 sq mi)
- Highest elevation: 119 m (390 ft)
- Lowest elevation: 111 m (364 ft)
- Population (2023): 2,136
  - Density: 226/km^{2} (585/sq mi)
- Time zone: UTC+01:00 (CET)
  - Summer (DST): UTC+02:00 (CEST)
- INSEE/Postal code: 77374 /77135
- ^{1} French Land Register data, which excludes lakes, ponds, glaciers > 1 km^{2} (0.386 sq mi or 247 acres) and river estuaries.

Pontcarré (French: [pɔ̃kaʁe]) is a commune in the Seine-et-Marne department in the Île-de-France region in north-central France.

== Geography ==
=== Geology ===
The commune is classified in a zone of Seismicity 1, corresponding to a very weak seismicity.

=== Hydrography ===
The Morbras River, a Tributary of the Marne, has its source in the town.

== Demographics ==
The inhabitants are called Pontcarréens in French. In 2020, the total number of dwellings in the municipality was 962, of which 68% were houses and 32% were apartments. Of these dwellings, 92.4% were principal residences, 0.6% were second homes and 7.0% were vacant dwellings. The share of households owning their principal residence was 80.2%.

Historical population
Year	Pop.	±% p.a.
1968	584	—
1975	1,166	+10.38%
1982	1,648	+5.07%
1990	1,748	+0.74%
1999	1,816	+0.42%
2007	2,009	+1.27%
2012	2,034	+0.25%
2017	2,251	+2.05%
2023	2,136	−0.87%
Source: INSEE

== See also ==
- Communes of the Seine-et-Marne department
