= Lognes =

- Commune
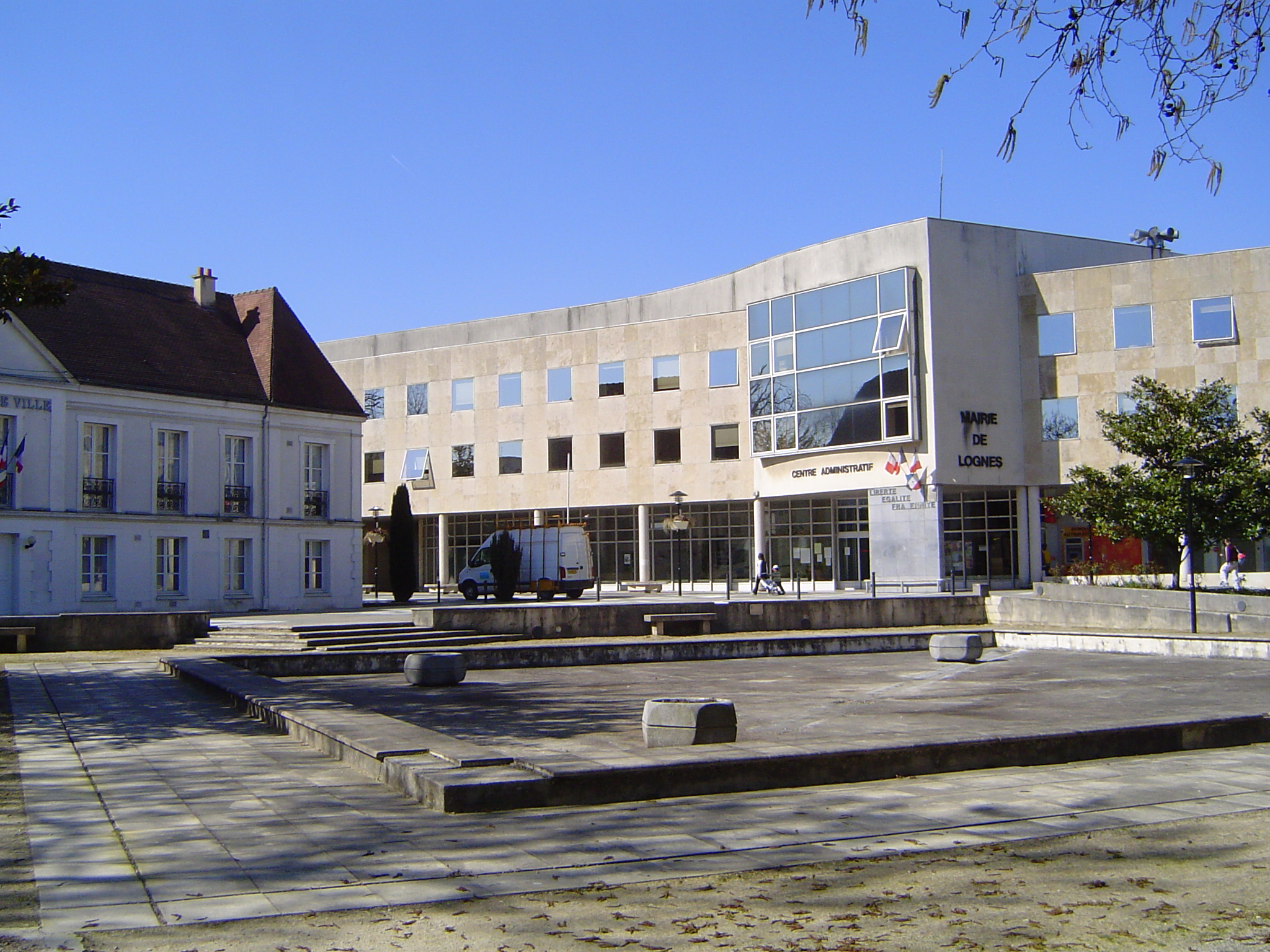
- The town hall in Lognes

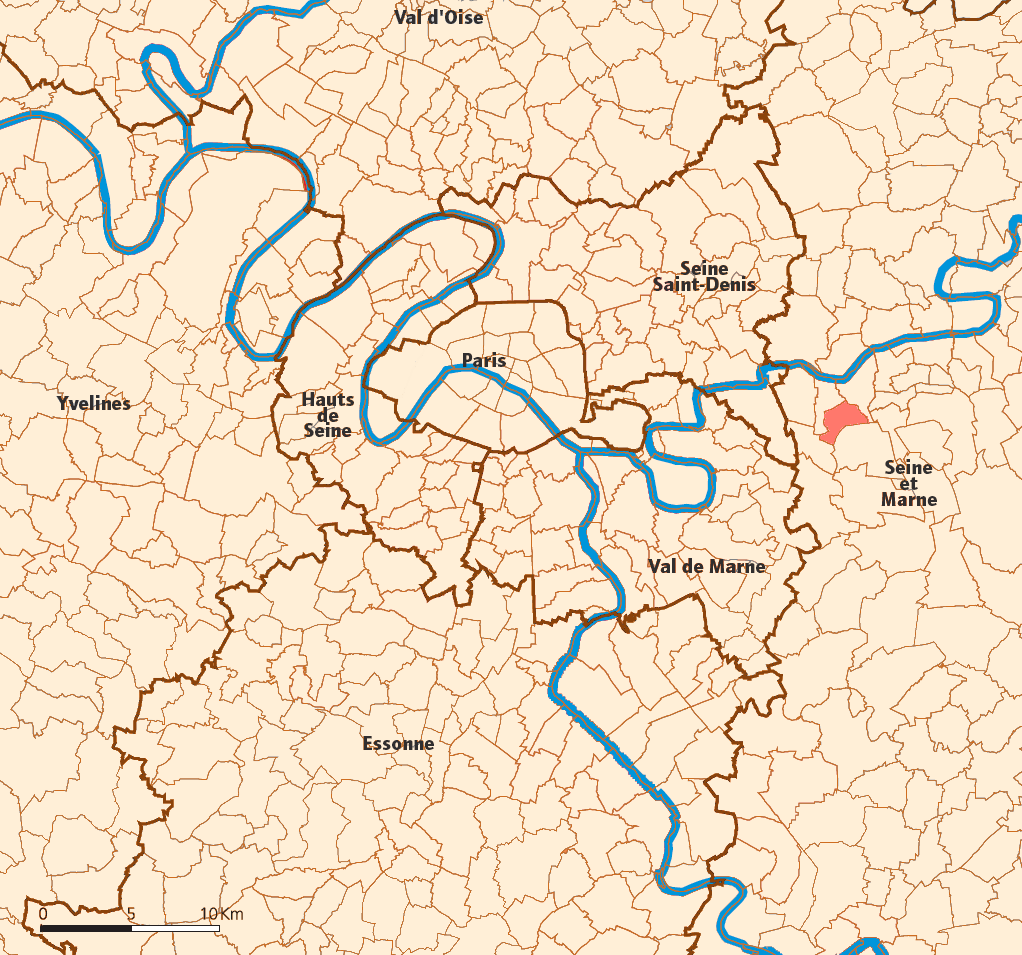
- Location (in red) within Paris inner and outer suburbs
- Location of Lognes
- Location within France Location within Île-de-France (region)
- Coordinates: 48°50′10″N 2°37′40″E
- Country: France
- Region: Île-de-France
- Department: Seine-et-Marne
- Arrondissement: Torcy
- Canton: Champs-sur-Marne
- Intercommunality: CA Paris - Vallée de la Marne

Government
  - Mayor (2023–2026): Nicolas Delaunay
- Area^{1}: 3.37 km^{2} (1.30 sq mi)
- Highest elevation: 109 m (358 ft)
- Lowest elevation: 70 m (230 ft)
- Population (2023): 15,074
  - Density: 4,470/km^{2} (11,600/sq mi)
- Time zone: UTC+01:00 (CET)
  - Summer (DST): UTC+02:00 (CEST)
- INSEE/Postal code: 77258 /77185
- ^{1} French Land Register data, which excludes lakes, ponds, glaciers > 1 km^{2} (0.386 sq mi or 247 acres) and river estuaries.

Lognes (French pronunciation: [lɔɲ]) is a community in the eastern suburbs of Paris, France. It is located in the Seine-et-Marne department in the Île-de-France 20.7 km (12.9 mi) from the center of Paris.

The community of Lognes is part of the Val Maubuée sector, one of the four sectors in the "new town" of Marne-la-Vallée.

== Demographics ==
Historical population
| Year | Pop. | ±% p.a. |
|---|---|---|
| 1968 | 297 | — |
| 1975 | 248 | −2.54% |
| 1982 | 1,707 | +31.73% |
| 1990 | 12,973 | +28.85% |
| 1999 | 14,215 | +1.02% |
| 2007 | 14,738 | +0.45% |
| 2012 | 14,575 | −0.22% |
| 2017 | 14,000 | −0.80% |
| 2023 | 15,074 | +1.24% |
Source: INSEE

=== Ethnicities ===
Lognes has the highest proportion of Asians of any town in France, over 40% of the population being of Asian descent, almost exclusively being or having ancestry from the former colonies of French Indochina (Cambodia, Laos, and Vietnam) as well as China. Ethnic business districts and community associations serving the Asian population are found throughout the city, in contrast to the circumstances coming from quick assimilation often characteristic of the Vietnamese, Laotian, and Cambodian populations in France.

As of 1998, 26% of the population was Asian.

== Transportation ==
Lognes is served by Lognes station on Paris RER line A.

== Education ==
The town has the following primary school groups (preschool and elementary school):

- Groupe scolaire Le Segrais
- Groupe scolaire Le Four
- Groupe scolaire La Maillière
- Groupe scolaire Le Village
- Groupe scolaire Le Mandinet

There are two junior high schools, Collège Le Segrais and Collège La Maillière, and one senior high school/sixth-form college, Lycée Emily Brontë.

Lognes has the following tertiary educational institutions:

- Unité Clinique Ostéopathique ADERO
- Ecole Supérieure de Management en Alternance
- Ecole Supérieure de Commerce International
- RISE Marne la Vallée
- Polytheig école des hautes études d’information et de gestion

Centre de formation d’apprentis SUP’TG is in Marne-la-Vallée. University of Marne-la-Vallée is in Champs-sur-Marne.

== See also ==
- Communes of the Seine-et-Marne department
