= Thorigny-sur-Marne =

- Commune
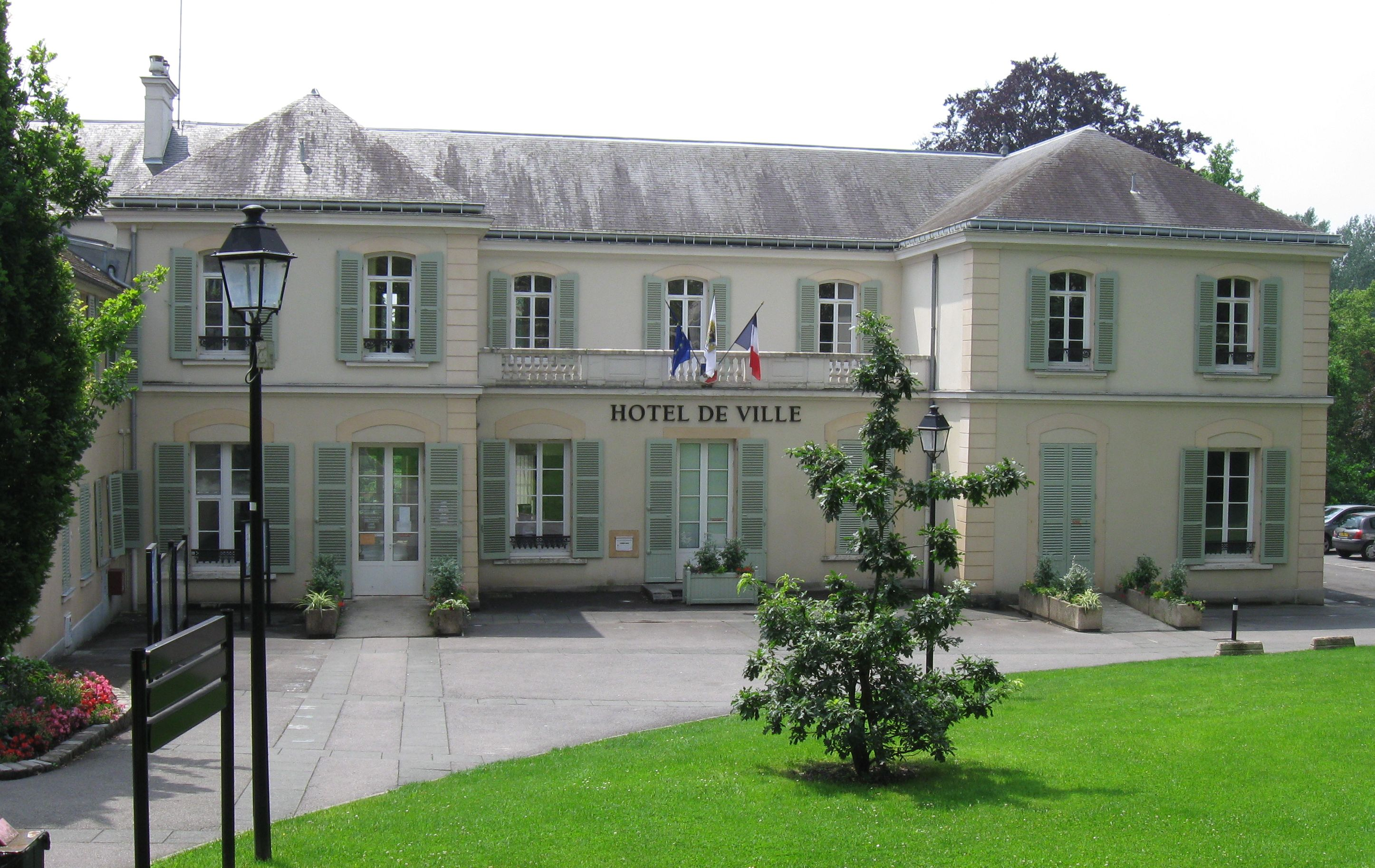
- The town hall of Thorigny-sur-Marne

- Coat of arms

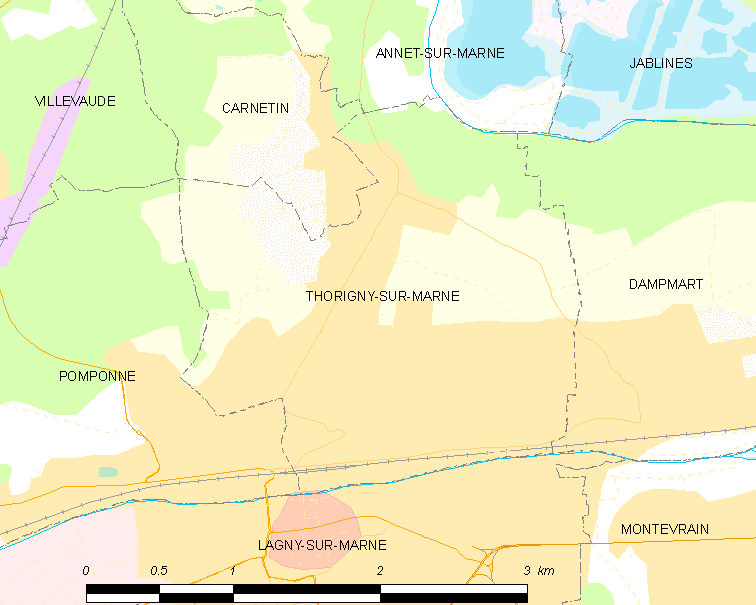
- Location of Thorigny-sur-Marne
- Location within France Location within Île-de-France (region)
- Coordinates: 48°53′04″N 2°42′51″E
- Country: France
- Region: Île-de-France
- Department: Seine-et-Marne
- Arrondissement: Torcy
- Canton: Lagny-sur-Marne
- Intercommunality: Marne et Gondoire

Government
  - Mayor (2020–2026): Manuel Luis Da Silva
- Area^{1}: 5.17 km^{2} (2.00 sq mi)
- Highest elevation: 122 m (400 ft)
- Lowest elevation: 38 m (125 ft)
- Population (2023): 10,440
  - Density: 2,020/km^{2} (5,230/sq mi)
- Demonym: Thorigniens
- Time zone: UTC+01:00 (CET)
  - Summer (DST): UTC+02:00 (CEST)
- INSEE/Postal code: 77464 /77400
- ^{1} French Land Register data, which excludes lakes, ponds, glaciers > 1 km^{2} (0.386 sq mi or 247 acres) and river estuaries.

Thorigny-sur-Marne (French pronunciation: [tɔʁiɲi syʁ maʁn]; lit. 'Thorigny-on-Marne') is a commune in the eastern outer suburbs of Paris, France. It is in the Seine-et-Marne department in the Île-de-France region.

== Demographics ==
Inhabitants of Thorigny-sur-Marne are called Thorigniens in French.

Historical population
| Year | Pop. | ±% p.a. |
|---|---|---|
| 1968 | 5,768 | — |
| 1975 | 7,059 | +2.93% |
| 1982 | 7,596 | +1.05% |
| 1990 | 8,326 | +1.15% |
| 1999 | 9,029 | +0.90% |
| 2007 | 9,386 | +0.49% |
| 2012 | 9,107 | −0.60% |
| 2017 | 10,154 | +2.20% |
| 2023 | 10,440 | +0.46% |
Source: INSEE

== Education ==
As of 2016 the three preschools have 376 students, and the three elementary schools have 640 students. The preschools are: Ecole Maternellle Les Cerisiers, Ecole Maternelle Clémenceau, and Ecole Maternelle Les Pointes. The elementary schools are Ecole Elémentaire Les Cerisiers, Ecole Elémentaire Gambetta, and Ecole Elémentaire Les Pointes. The commune has one junior high school, Collège du Moulin à vent, and a vocational high school, Lycée Auguste Perdonnet. The area general senior high school/sixth form college, Lycée Van Dongen, is in Lagny-sur-Marne.

== History ==
In 1649, during the reign of Louis XIV, Thorigny-Sur-Marne was brutally pillaged for 12 days by the Regiment de Conti after agreeing to give them quarter. Witnesses describe how they "used extraordinary violence, having beaten and ransomed the inhabitants, pillaged and burned their furnishings...cut down their fruit trees...eaten and scattered their flock."

== See also ==
- Communes of the Seine-et-Marne department
