= Bussy-Saint-Martin =

- Commune
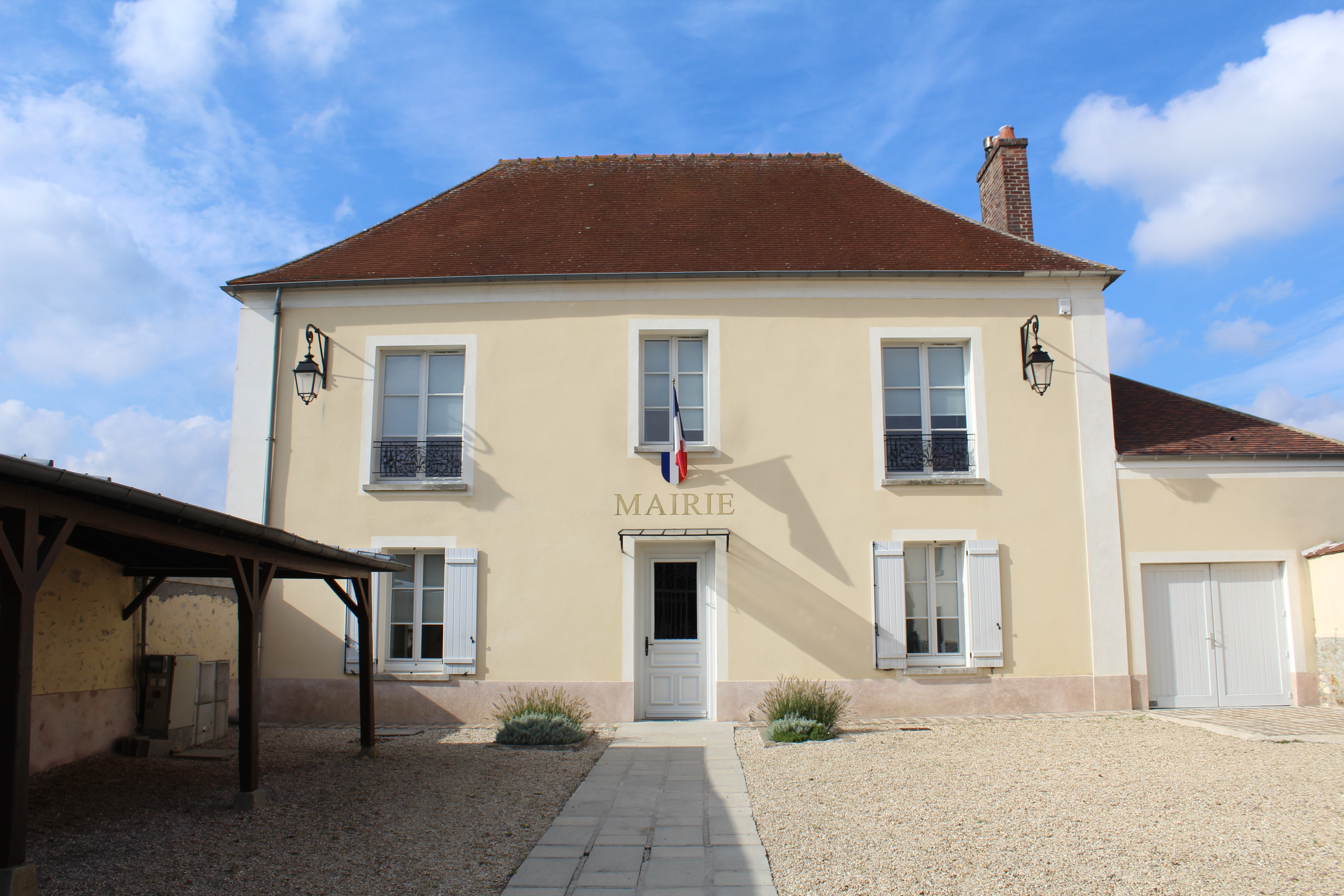
- The town hall in Bussy-Saint-Martin

- Coat of arms
- Location of Bussy-Saint-Martin
- Location within France Location within Île-de-France (region)
- Coordinates: 48°51′00″N 2°41′28″E
- Country: France
- Region: Île-de-France
- Department: Seine-et-Marne
- Arrondissement: Torcy
- Canton: Torcy
- Intercommunality: CA Marne et Gondoire

Government
  - Mayor (2020–2026): Patrick Guichard
- Area^{1}: 2.41 km^{2} (0.93 sq mi)
- Highest elevation: 111 m (364 ft)
- Lowest elevation: 54 m (177 ft)
- Population (2023): 738
  - Density: 306/km^{2} (793/sq mi)
- Time zone: UTC+01:00 (CET)
  - Summer (DST): UTC+02:00 (CEST)
- INSEE/Postal code: 77059 /77600
- ^{1} French Land Register data, which excludes lakes, ponds, glaciers > 1 km^{2} (0.386 sq mi or 247 acres) and river estuaries.

Bussy-Saint-Martin (French pronunciation: [bysi sɛ̃ maʁtɛ̃]) is a commune in the Seine-et-Marne department in the Île-de-France region.

== Demographics ==
The inhabitants are called Bucéens.

== See also ==
- Communes of the Seine-et-Marne department
