= Saint-Thibault-des-Vignes =

- Commune
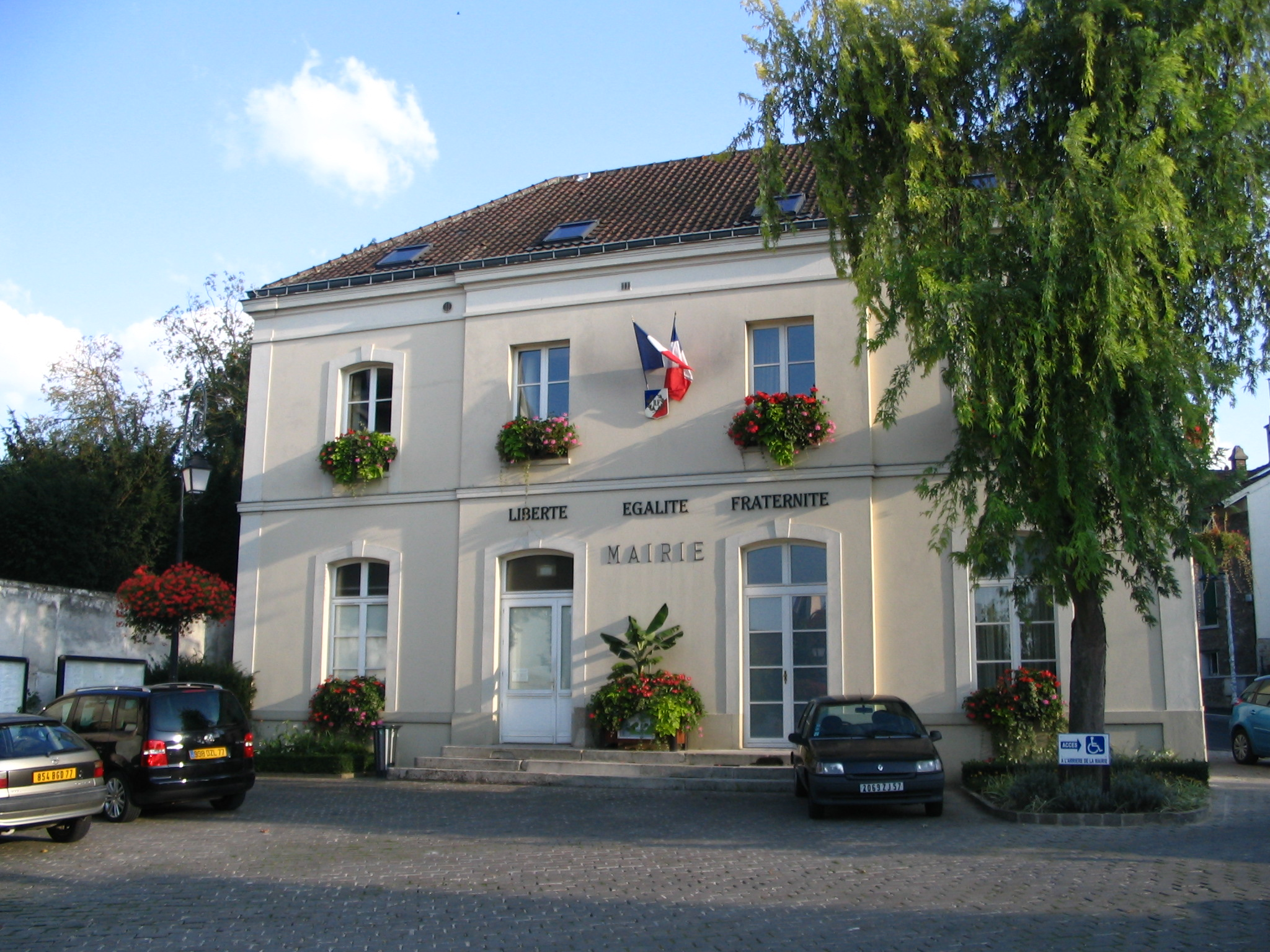
- The town hall in Saint-Thibault-des-Vignes
- Location of Saint-Thibault-des-Vignes
- Location within France Location within Île-de-France (region)
- Coordinates: 48°52′08″N 2°41′19″E
- Country: France
- Region: Île-de-France
- Department: Seine-et-Marne
- Arrondissement: Torcy
- Canton: Lagny-sur-Marne
- Intercommunality: Marne et Gondoire

Government
  - Mayor (2024–2026): Christian Plumard
- Area^{1}: 4.70 km^{2} (1.81 sq mi)
- Highest elevation: 99 m (325 ft)
- Lowest elevation: 39 m (128 ft)
- Population (2023): 6,831
  - Density: 1,450/km^{2} (3,760/sq mi)
- Time zone: UTC+01:00 (CET)
  - Summer (DST): UTC+02:00 (CEST)
- INSEE/Postal code: 77438 /77400
- ^{1} French Land Register data, which excludes lakes, ponds, glaciers > 1 km^{2} (0.386 sq mi or 247 acres) and river estuaries.

Saint-Thibault-des-Vignes (French pronunciation: [sɛ̃ tibo de viɲ]) is a commune in the Seine-et-Marne department, located in the Île-de-France region in north-central France.

== Population ==
Inhabitants of Saint-Thibault-des-Vignes are known as Théobaldiens in French.

Historical population
Year	Pop.	±% p.a.
1968	775	—
1975	1,288	+7.53%
1982	1,412	+1.32%
1990	4,207	+14.62%
1999	6,382	+4.74%
2007	6,510	+0.25%
2012	6,256	−0.79%
2017	6,447	+0.60%
2023	6,831	+0.97%
Source: INSEE

== Education ==
There are three school groups (combined preschools and elementary schools) in the commune: Marie Curie, Pierre Villette, and Edouard Thomas. There is one junior high school, Collège public Léonard de Vinci.

Area public senior high schools:

- Lycée polyvalent Arche Gédon - Torcy
- Lycée Van Dongen - Lagny-sur-Marne
- Lycée Martin Luther King - Bussy-Saint-Georges

Area private schools:

- Collège privé Saint Laurent - Lagny-sur-Marne

== Twin towns ==
Saint-Thibault-des-Vignes is twinned with:

- Badia Polesine, Italy

== See also ==
- Communes of the Seine-et-Marne department
