= Jossigny =

- Commune
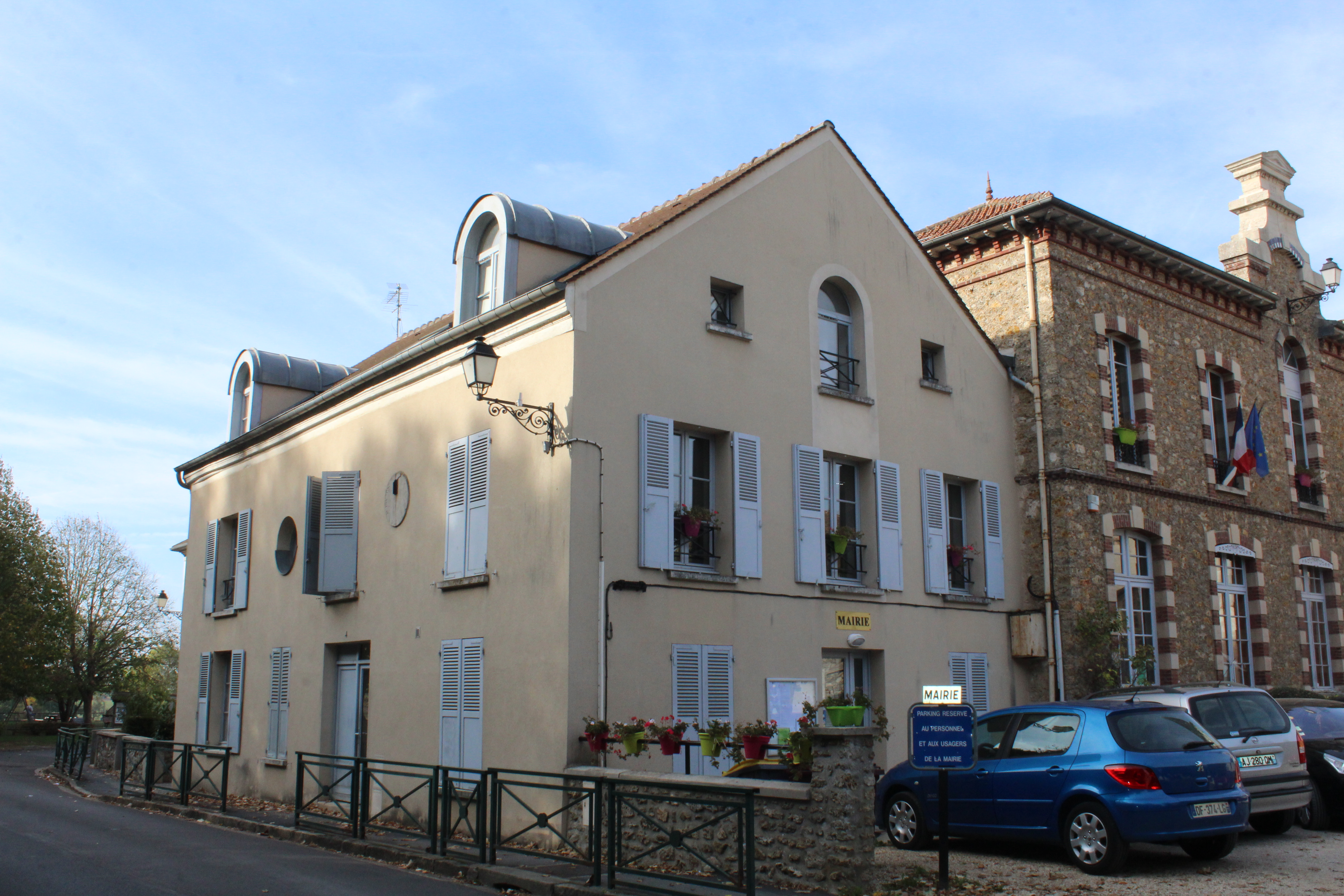
- The town hall in Jossigny
- Location of Jossigny
- Location within France Location within Île-de-France (region)
- Coordinates: 48°50′19″N 2°45′14″E
- Country: France
- Region: Île-de-France
- Department: Seine-et-Marne
- Arrondissement: Torcy
- Canton: Torcy
- Intercommunality: Marne et Gondoire

Government
  - Mayor (2020–2026): Patrick Maillard
- Area^{1}: 9.62 km^{2} (3.71 sq mi)
- Highest elevation: 149 m (489 ft)
- Lowest elevation: 107 m (351 ft)
- Population (2023): 650
  - Density: 68/km^{2} (170/sq mi)
- Time zone: UTC+01:00 (CET)
  - Summer (DST): UTC+02:00 (CEST)
- INSEE/Postal code: 77237 /77600
- ^{1} French Land Register data, which excludes lakes, ponds, glaciers > 1 km^{2} (0.386 sq mi or 247 acres) and river estuaries.

Jossigny (French pronunciation: [ʒɔsiɲi]) is a commune in the Seine-et-Marne department in the Île-de-France region in north-central France. It is located in the Val de Bussy sector of Marne-la-Vallée. As of 2018, its population was 671.

== Demographics ==
Inhabitants are called Jossignaciens.

== School ==
The municipality has a single preschool and elementary school.

== See also ==
- Communes of the Seine-et-Marne department
