= Ferrières-en-Brie =

- Commune
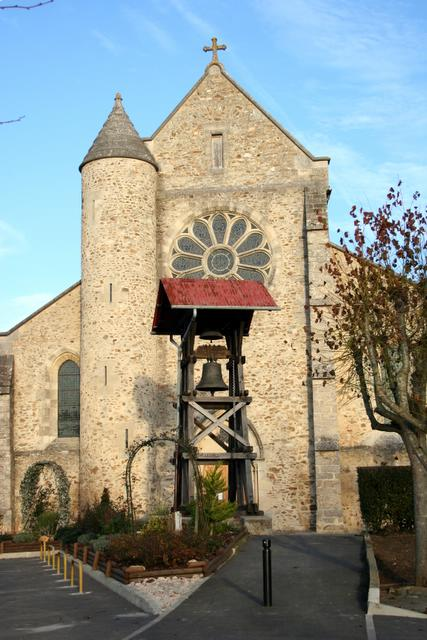
- Saint Rémy Church

- Coat of arms
- Location of Ferrières-en-Brie
- Location within France Location within Île-de-France (region)
- Coordinates: 48°49′25″N 2°42′21″E
- Country: France
- Region: Île-de-France
- Department: Seine-et-Marne
- Arrondissement: Torcy
- Canton: Ozoir-la-Ferrière
- Intercommunality: CA Marne et Gondoire

Government
  - Mayor (2020–2026): Mireille Munch
- Area^{1}: 6.75 km^{2} (2.61 sq mi)
- Highest elevation: 126 m (413 ft)
- Lowest elevation: 84 m (276 ft)
- Population (2023): 3,932
  - Density: 583/km^{2} (1,510/sq mi)
- Demonym: Ferrièrois
- Time zone: UTC+01:00 (CET)
  - Summer (DST): UTC+02:00 (CEST)
- INSEE/Postal code: 77181 /77164
- ^{1} French Land Register data, which excludes lakes, ponds, glaciers > 1 km^{2} (0.386 sq mi or 247 acres) and river estuaries.

Ferrières-en-Brie (French pronunciation: [fɛʁjɛʁ ɑ̃ bʁi]; lit. 'Ferrières-in-Brie'; before 1996, simply Ferrières) is a commune in the Seine-et-Marne department in the Île-de-France region in northern France.

== Geography ==
Ferrières-en-Brie is located 26 km (16 mi) east of Paris, on the Brie plateau, between the Seine river and Marne river valleys. It is twinned with the village of Dunchurch, Warwickshire, United Kingdom.

== Population ==
Inhabitants of Ferrières-en-Brie are called Ferrièrois (masculine) and Ferrièroises (feminine) in French.

Historical population
Year	Pop.	±% p.a.
1968	941	—
1975	1,031	+1.31%
1982	1,340	+3.82%
1990	1,445	+0.95%
1999	1,655	+1.52%
2007	2,138	+3.25%
2012	2,288	+1.37%
2017	3,433	+8.45%
2023	3,932	+2.29%
Source: INSEE

== Education ==
The town has a single public preschool and elementary school, groupe scolaire de la Taffarette.

== Castle ==
- Château de Ferrières, built in the 19th century by Joseph Paxton for James de Rotschild on the place of the former castle of Joseph Fouché, Duke of Otranto

== See also ==
- Communes of the Seine-et-Marne department
