= Chalifert =

- Commune
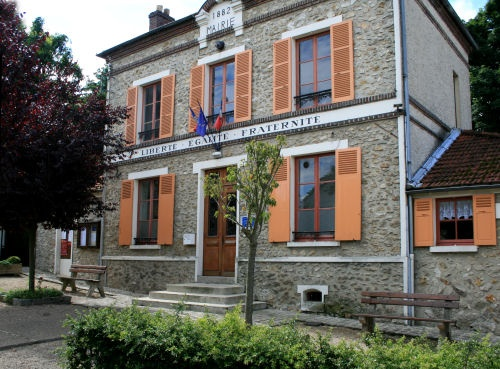
- The town hall in Chalifert

- Coat of arms
- Location of Chalifert
- Location within France Location within Île-de-France (region)
- Coordinates: 48°53′19″N 2°46′23″E
- Country: France
- Region: Île-de-France
- Department: Seine-et-Marne
- Arrondissement: Torcy
- Canton: Lagny-sur-Marne
- Intercommunality: CA Marne et Gondoire

Government
  - Mayor (2020–2026): Laurent Simon
- Area^{1}: 2.42 km^{2} (0.93 sq mi)
- Highest elevation: 120 m (390 ft)
- Lowest elevation: 39 m (128 ft)
- Population (2023): 1,584
  - Density: 655/km^{2} (1,700/sq mi)
- Time zone: UTC+01:00 (CET)
  - Summer (DST): UTC+02:00 (CEST)
- INSEE/Postal code: 77075 /77144
- ^{1} French Land Register data, which excludes lakes, ponds, glaciers > 1 km^{2} (0.386 sq mi or 247 acres) and river estuaries.

Chalifert (French pronunciation: [ʃalifɛʁ]) is a commune in the Seine-et-Marne département in the Île-de-France region in north-central France.

== Demographics ==
The inhabitants are called Chaliférois.

== See also ==
- Communes of the Seine-et-Marne department
