= Chanteloup-en-Brie =

- Commune
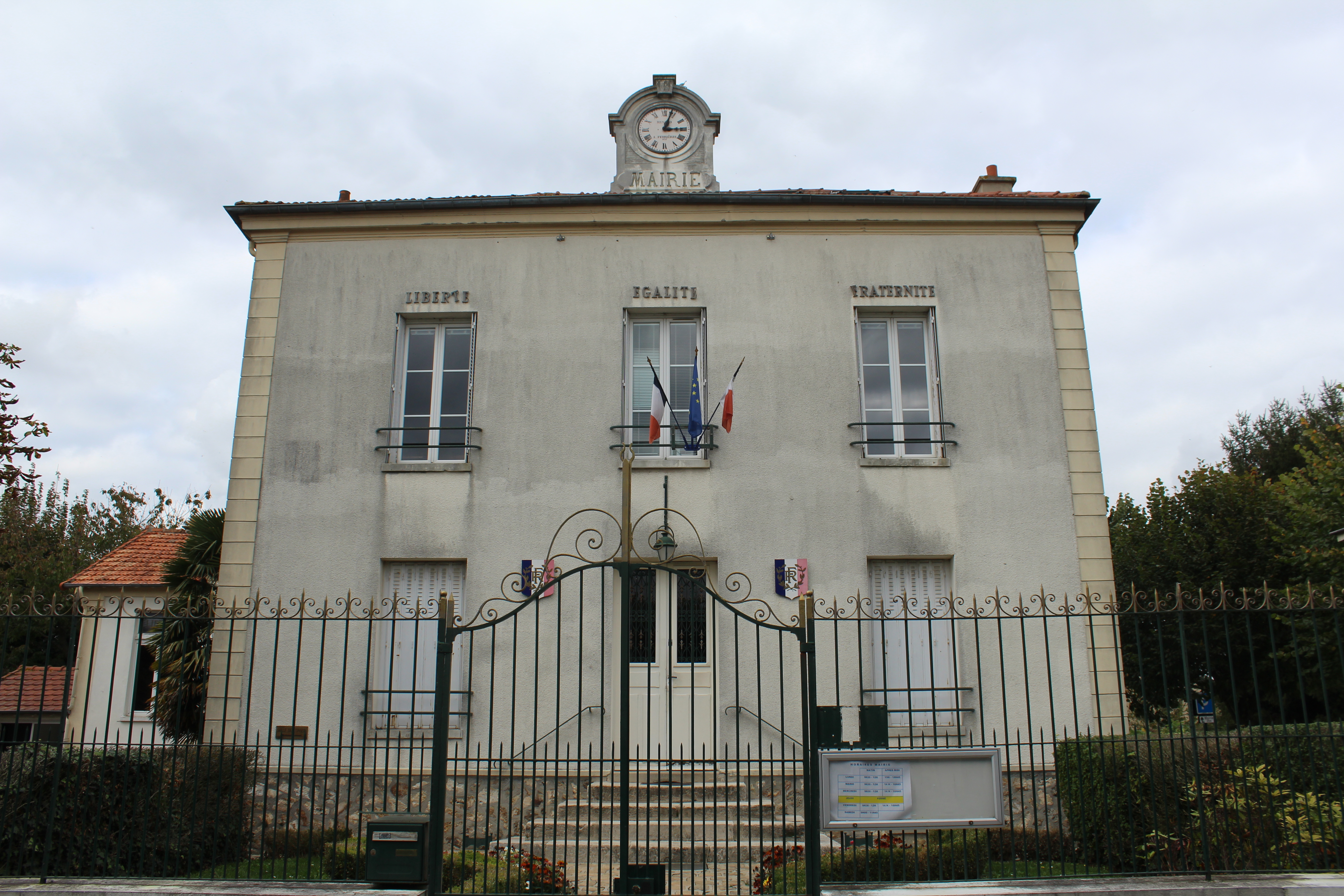
- The town hall in Chanteloup-en-Brie

- Coat of arms
- Location of Chanteloup-en-Brie
- Location within France Location within Île-de-France (region)
- Coordinates: 48°51′20″N 2°44′24″E
- Country: France
- Region: Île-de-France
- Department: Seine-et-Marne
- Arrondissement: Torcy
- Canton: Lagny-sur-Marne
- Intercommunality: CA Marne et Gondoire

Government
  - Mayor (2020–2026): Olivier Colaisseau
- Area^{1}: 3.12 km^{2} (1.20 sq mi)
- Highest elevation: 124 m (407 ft)
- Lowest elevation: 90 m (300 ft)
- Population (2023): 4,130
  - Density: 1,320/km^{2} (3,430/sq mi)
- Time zone: UTC+01:00 (CET)
  - Summer (DST): UTC+02:00 (CEST)
- INSEE/Postal code: 77085 /77600
- ^{1} French Land Register data, which excludes lakes, ponds, glaciers > 1 km^{2} (0.386 sq mi or 247 acres) and river estuaries.

Chanteloup-en-Brie (French pronunciation: [ʃɑ̃tlu ɑ̃ bʁi], literally Chanteloup in Brie, before 1987: Chanteloup) is a commune in the Seine-et-Marne department in the Île-de-France region in north-central France.

== Population ==
Historical population
Year	Pop.	±% p.a.
1968	384	—
1975	414	+1.08%
1982	463	+1.61%
1990	1,222	+12.90%
1999	1,780	+4.27%
2007	1,862	+0.56%
2012	2,533	+6.35%
2017	3,953	+9.31%
2023	4,130	+0.73%
Source: INSEE

The inhabitants are called Chanteloupiens in French.

== Education ==
There are two schools: Maternelle Le Cantou (preschool) and Élémentaire Le Loupiot (elementary school).

== See also ==
- Communes of the Seine-et-Marne department
