= Noisiel station =

Railway station in Noisiel, France

Noisiel Le Luzard
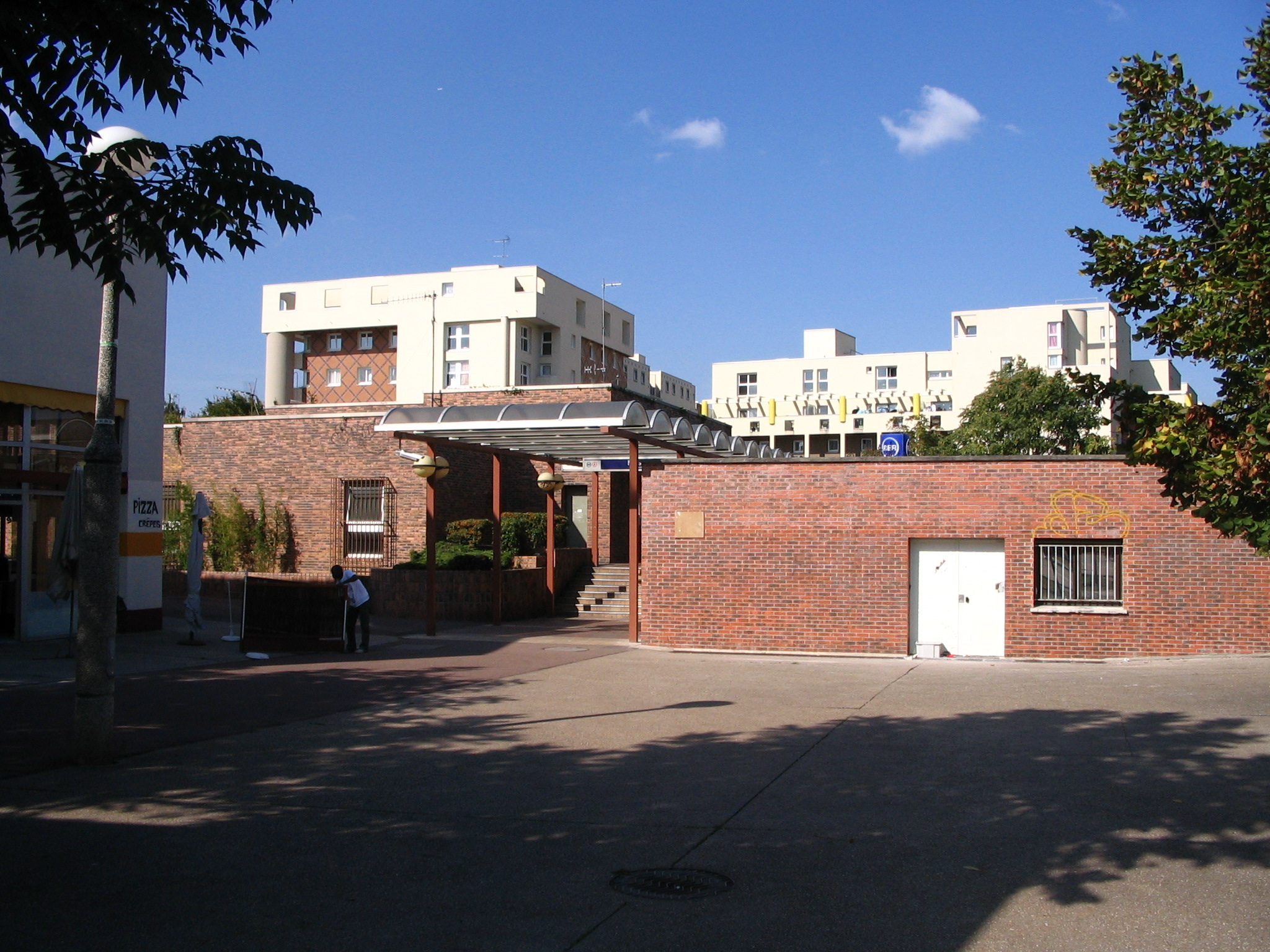

General information
- Location: Noisiel; France
- Coordinates: 48°50′36″N 2°37′00″E
- Operator: RATP Group
- Platforms: 2 side platforms
- Tracks: 2

Construction
- Structure type: Below-grade
- Cycle facilities: Véligo parking station
- Accessible: Yes, by request to staff

Other information
- Station code: 87758359
- Fare zone: 5

History
- Opened: 19 December 1980

Passengers
- 2019: 3,016,034

Services
Preceding station	RER	Following station
Noisy–Champs towards Cergy-le-Haut	RER A	Lognes towards Marne-la-Vallée–Chessy
Location

Noisiel station is a railway station on the Réseau Express Régional train network in Noisiel, Seine-et-Marne.

== Description ==
=== History ===
Noisiel station opened on 19 December 1980, when RER line A was extended to Torcy, as well as Noisy–Champs and Lognes stations.

=== Traffic ===
As of 2019, the estimated annual attendance by the RATP Group was 3,016,034 passengers.

== Transport ==
=== Train ===
The average waiting time for trains to Paris and to Marne-la-Vallée–Chessy is 10 minutes. But during peak hours most trains bound to Chessy do not stop at Noisiel, and passengers may take the trains that are bound to Torcy.

=== Bus connections ===
The station is served by several buses:

- RATP Bus network lines: 211 (to Vaires-sur-Marne and to Torcy), 213 (to Chelles via Noisy–Champs and to Lognes) and 220 (to Bry–sur-Marne and to Torcy);
- Arlequin Bus network line: 10 (to Brie-Comte-Robert);
- Sit'bus Bus network line: C (to Pontault-Combault);
- Noctilien network night bus line: N130 (between Paris (Gare de Lyon) and Marne-la-Vallée–Chessy - Disneyland).
