= Neuilly-Plaisance station =

Railway station in Neuilly-Plaisance, France

Neuilly-Plaisance
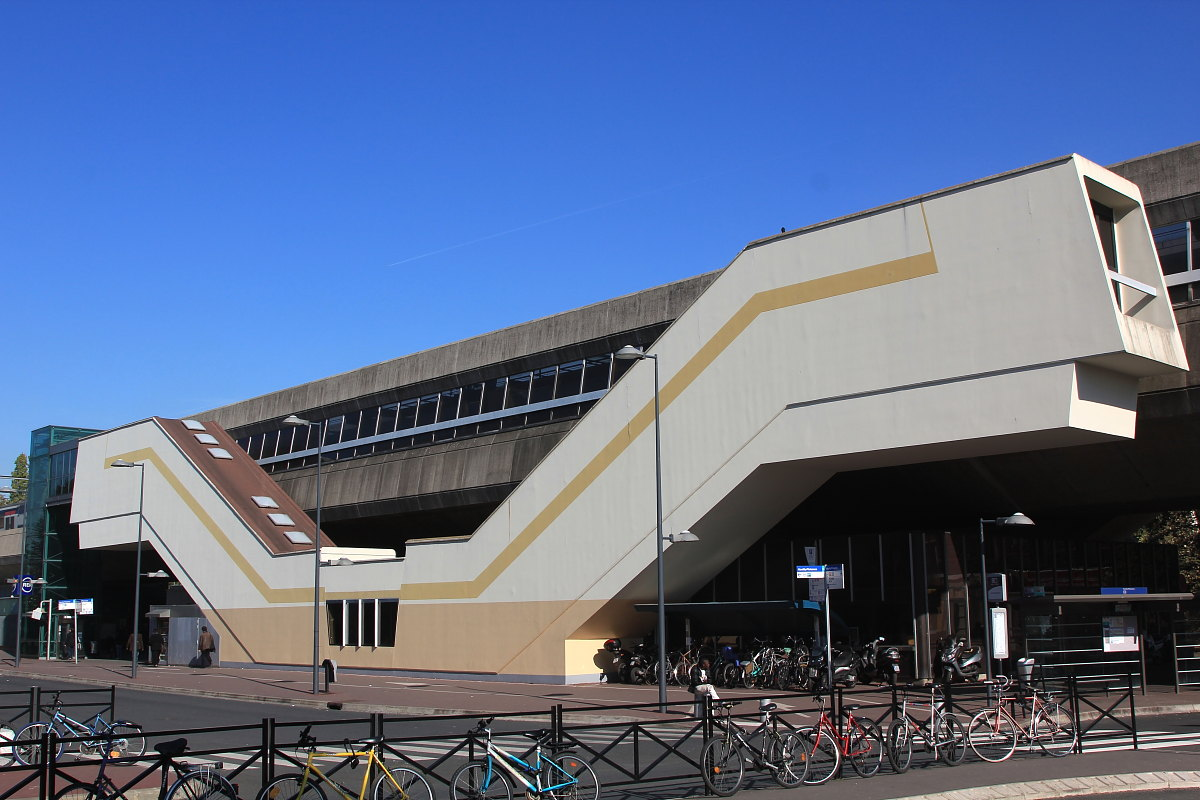
- Neuilly-Plaisance station entrance

General information
- Location: Neuilly-Plaisance; France
- Coordinates: 48°51′12″N 2°30′49″E
- Operator: RATP Group
- Platforms: 2 side platforms
- Tracks: 2
- Connections: RATP Bus: 113 114 203 214; Noctilien: N34 N141

Construction
- Structure type: Elevated
- Accessible: Yes, by request to staff

Other information
- Station code: 87758318
- Fare zone: 3

History
- Opened: 9 December 1977

Passengers
- 2019: 5,924,171

Services
Preceding station	RER	Following station
Val de Fontenay towards Cergy-le-Haut	RER A	Bry-sur-Marne towards Marne-la-Vallée–Chessy
Location

Neuilly-Plaisance station is a train station in Neuilly-Plaisance, Seine-Saint-Denis, about 10 kilometres (6.2 mi) east of Gare de Lyon in Paris.

== Description ==
The station is on A4 branch of RER line A, on a bridge over the Marne.

As of 2019, the estimated annual attendance by the RATP Group was 5,924,171 passengers.

== Service ==
=== Train ===
The station is served by trains to Paris and to Marne-la-Vallée. During peak hours, 6–12 trains serve the station in both directions. At off-peak times the average waiting time is 10 minutes, or 15 minutes during the evening.

=== Bus connections ===
The station is served by several buses:

- RATP Bus:
  - 113 (to Nogent-sur-Marne and Chelles)
  - 114 (to Vincennes and Villemomble)
  - 203 (to Neuilly-sur-Marne)
  - 214 (to Gagny)
- Noctilien network:
  - N34 (to Paris (Gare de Lyon) and Torcy)
  - N141 (to Paris (Gare de l'Est) and Meaux)
