= Lognes station =

Railway station in Lognes, France

Lognes Le Mandinet
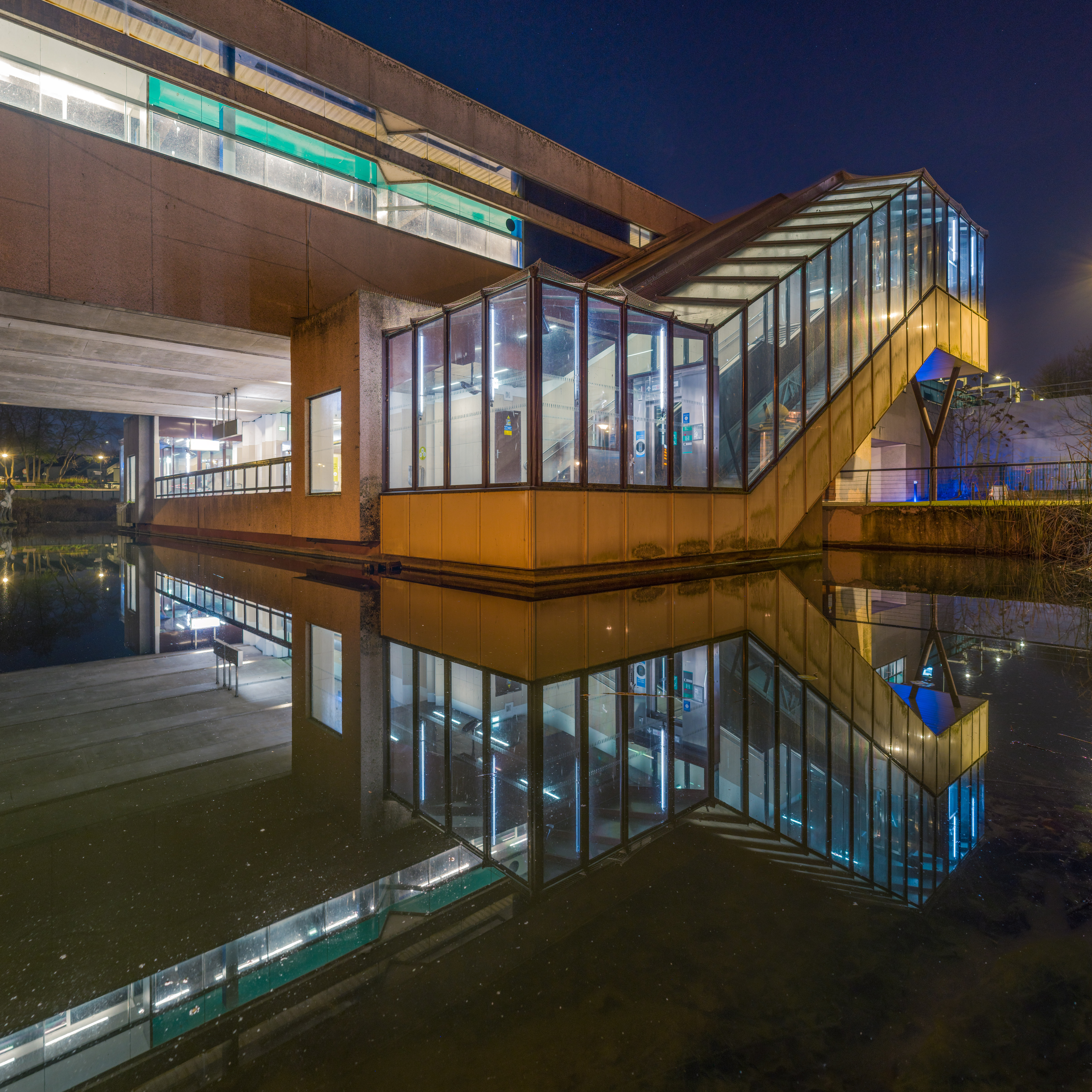
- North side of the station at night.

General information
- Location: Rue Jehan Scarron; Lognes; France
- Coordinates: 48°50′20″N 2°38′02″E
- Operator: RATP Group
- Platforms: 2 side platforms
- Tracks: 2

Construction
- Structure type: Elevated
- Cycle facilities: Véligo parking station
- Accessible: Yes, by request to staff

Other information
- Station code: 87758367
- Fare zone: 5

History
- Opened: 19 December 1980

Passengers
- 2019: 1,680,012

Services
Preceding station	RER	Following station
Noisiel towards Cergy-le-Haut	RER A	Torcy towards Marne-la-Vallée–Chessy
Location

Lognes station is a railway station on RER train network in Lognes, Seine-et-Marne.

== Description ==
=== History ===
Lognes station opened on 19 December 1980, when RER line A was extended to Torcy.

=== Traffic ===
As of 2019, the estimated annual attendance by the RATP Group was 1,680,012 passengers.

== Transport ==
=== Train ===
During peak hours, there is a train to Paris every 10 minutes and a train to Marne-la-Vallée – Chessy every 15 minutes. At off-peak time, the average waiting time for trains to Paris and Marne-la-Vallée Chessy is 15 minutes. The first train to Paris leaves at 5 am, the last leaves at 0h30.

=== Bus connections ===
The station is served by several buses:

- RATP Bus network lines: 211 (to Vaires-sur-Marne and to Torcy) and 321 (to Torcy via Pariest industrial park in Croissy-Beaubourg and to Lognes – Emerainville aerodrome);
- Sit'bus Bus network line: C (at remote bus stop called Rue de la Ferme) (to Pontault-Combault and to Noisiel);
- Noctilien network night bus line: N130 (at remote bus stop called Cours des Lacs) (between Paris (Gare de Lyon) and Marne-la-Vallée–Chessy – Disneyland).
