= Bussy-Saint-Georges station =

Railway station in Bussy-Saint-Georges, France

Bussy-Saint-Georges
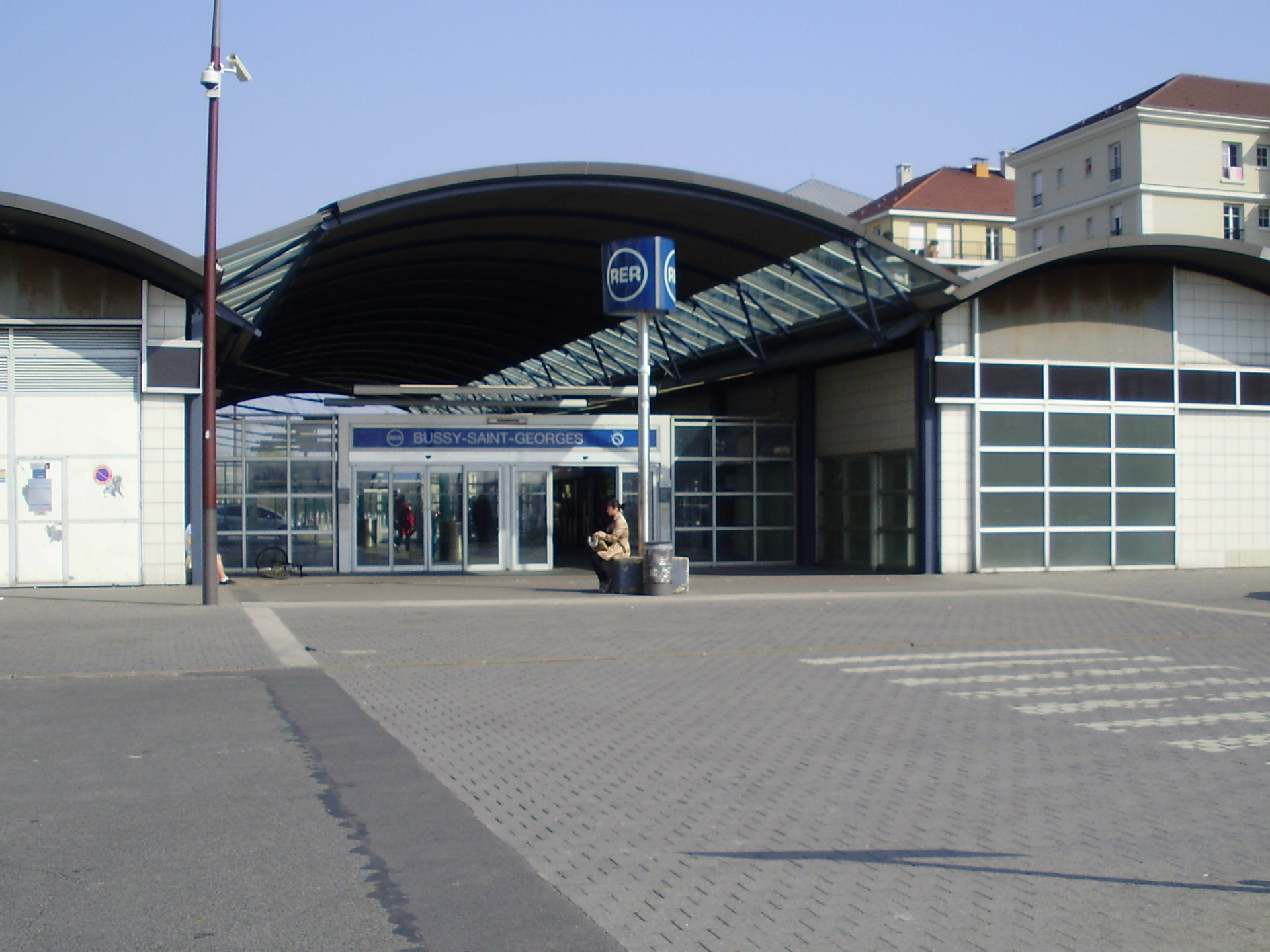
- Entrance to Bussy-Saint-Georges station

General information
- Location: 1 Place Fulgence-Bienvenüe; Bussy-Saint-Georges; France
- Coordinates: 48°50′11″N 2°42′34″E
- Operator: RATP Group
- Platforms: 2 side platforms
- Tracks: 2

Construction
- Structure type: Below-grade
- Parking: 407 spaces
- Accessible: Yes, by request to staff

Other information
- Station code: 87754986
- Fare zone: 5

History
- Opened: 21 December 1992

Passengers
- 2019: 3,298,143

Services
Preceding station	RER	Following station
Torcy towards Cergy-le-Haut	RER A	Val d'Europe towards Marne-la-Vallée–Chessy
Location

Bussy-Saint-Georges station is a railway station on RER train network in Bussy-Saint-Georges, Seine-et-Marne, France.

== History ==
Bussy-Saint-Georges station opened on 21 December 1992 on an already existing portion of the line. In fact, trains on line A of the RER used to run without stopping between Torcy and Marne-la-Vallée – Chessy stations since 1 April 1992, start date of the new terminus of the Marne-la-Vallée branch (A4).

The objective of this commissioning, proposed my Gabriel Howard, is to support the development of the new town of Marne-la-Vallée, while serving the agglomeration of Bussy-Saint-Georges which is part of sector 3, known as Val de Bussy, of this new town.

== Traffic ==
As of 2019, the estimated annual attendance by the RATP Group was 3,298,143 passengers.

== Service ==
=== Train ===
The average waiting time for trains to Paris and to Marne-la-Vallée – Chessy is 15 minutes.

=== Bus connections ===
The station is served by several buses:

- Marne-la-Vallée: 2222 2226 2228 2244 2245
- Noctilien: N130
