= Marne-la-Vallée bus network =

Bus network in Marne-la-Vallée, France

Marne-la-Vallée
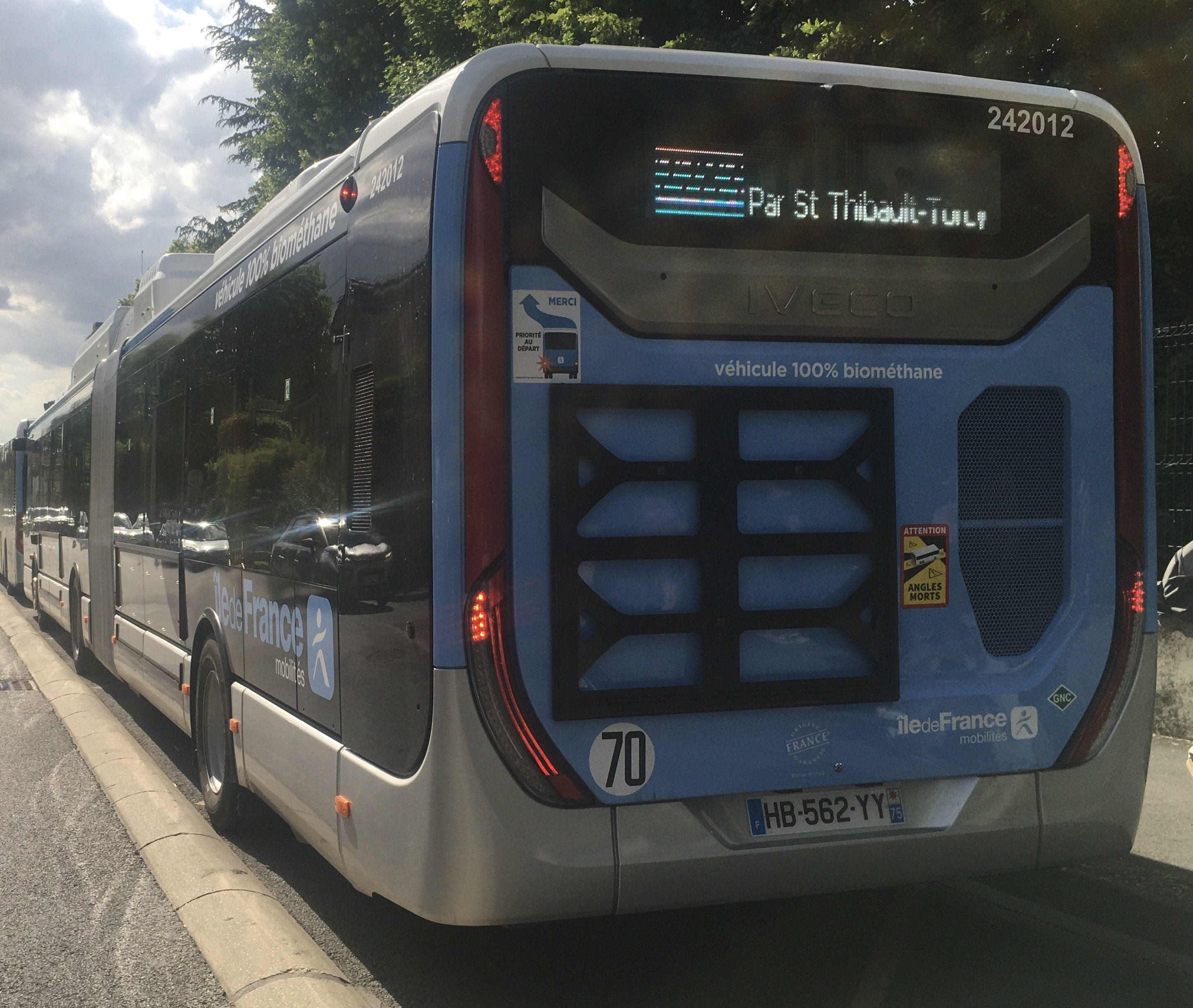
- Iveco Urbanway 18 GNV n°242012 of line 2283 waiting his students at Saint-Laurent (Rue Brébion), Lagny-sur-Marne.
- Parent: Île-de-France Mobilités
- Founded: January 1, 2021
- Service area: Annet-sur-Marne, Bailly-Romainvilliers, Brou-sur-Chantereine, Bussy-Saint-Georges, Bussy-Saint-Martin, Carnetin, Champs-sur-Marne, Chanteloup-en-Brie, Chalifert, Chessy, Claye-Souilly, Collégien, Conches-sur-Gondoire, Condé-Sainte-Libiaire, Coupvray, Croissy-Beaubourg, Dampmart, Emerainville, Esbly, Favières, Ferrières-en-Brie, Gournay-sur-Marne, Gouvernes, Guermantes, Jablines, Jossigny, Lagny-sur-Marne, Lesches, Lognes, Magny-le-Hongre, Montévrain, Montry, Noisiel, Ozoir-la-Ferrière, Pomponne, Pontcarré, Quincy-Voisins, Saint-Germain-sur-Morin, Saint-Thibault-des-Vignes, Serris, Thorigny-sur-Marne, Torcy, Tournan-en-Brie, Thorigny-sur-Marne, Villeneuve-le-Comte, Villeneuve-Saint-Denis
- Routes: 2220 2221 2222 2223 2224; 2225 2226 2228 2229 2231; 2233 2234 2235 2244 2245; 2250 2251 2252 2253 2254; 2260 2261 2262 2263 2264; 2280 2281 2282 2283 2284; 2290 2291 2292
- Operator: Transdev (Transdev Marne-la-Vallée)
- Website: Marne-la-Vallée bus network website

Marne-la-Vallée is a French bus network run by Île-de-France Mobilités, operated by Transdev via his subsidiary Transdev Marne-la-Vallée from January 1, 2021.

It consists of 33 lines which mainly serve the catchment area of Marne-la-Vallée. The network is also completed with four night lines.

== History ==
=== Pep's bus network ===
The Marne-la-Vallée bus network was created under the Pep's bus brand in 1995, seven years after Transdev bought the local bus company Transdev AMV following an agreement between Transdev and the transport union of sectors 3 and 4 of Marne-la-Vallée. It consisted of 12 lines.

The Pep's bus network was gradually formed, with the development of the Pep's image on buses and bus stop signs (450 were created for the occasion) on March 9, 1998.

That same year, Europe Autocars, which manages the bus network in the northern Marne region, comprised five lines that integrated the Pep's bus network. It is now managed by the Syndicat Intercommunal d'Études des Mobilités Urbaines.

Since the 2000s, the intensive development of the Val d'Europe area has made it possible to improve the service offered, by improving communication with users, with the creation of passenger information screens on buses, ticket offices dedicated to the network, a website including real-time timetables for all lines as well as a discussion forum. Despite the frequency of some bus lines on the network being lower than that of RER A (a train every five minutes in the evening at Torcy station, for example) but similar to that of RER E (a train every fifteen minutes at Tournan station, for example), the Pep's network is booming, thanks to modifications and reinforcements on its lines, and accompanies the development of the new town of Marne-la-Vallée.

==== Last years of Pep's ====
In 2017, the organizing authority Île-de-France Mobilités (ex-STIF), having just refreshed its identity, opted for a strong communication called "Transport Revolution in Île-de-France", then "Grand Paris des Buses". It concerns, among other things, the improvement of more than 150 bus lines distributed within the networks located in the outer suburbs. It was from this date that the pink bus livery characteristic of the Pep's brand was abandoned, in favor of the blue livery of Île-de-France Mobilités, now common to all bus networks in the Île-de-France region.

In 2018, the new northern bus station was inaugurated with nine new platforms, doubling its capacity. While the southern bus station, located on Avenue Paul Séramy, opens to the public on July 1, 2019, to accommodate the new line 47 of the network.

Until the opening to the competition and his renaming to Marne-la-Vallée, many lines were created, restructured, disbanded or transferred to Disneyland Paris privates shuttles.

=== Opening to the competition ===
Following the opening of public transport to competition in Île-de-France, the Pep's bus network became Marne-la-Vallée on January 1, 2021, corresponding to public service delegation number 10 established by Île-de-France Mobilités. A call for tenders was therefore launched by the organizing authority to designate a company that will succeed the operation of Transdev AMV for a period of five years. It was finally Transdev, via its subsidiary Transdev Marne-la-Vallée, which was designated during the board of directors of July 8, 2020.

At the date of its opening to competition, the network consisted of lines 02, 04, 06, 07, 12, 13, 14, 15, 21, 22, 23, 24, 25, 26, 27, 29, 32, 34, 35, 37, 42, 43, 44, 46 and 47 of Pep's, and lines 7, 57 and 60 of Grand Morin.

==== Network development ====
Starting September 2, 2021. The line 20 is created in five services for Saint-Laurent-La-Paix - Notre Dame school complex.

On November 7, 2022, a new departure to the Collège Léonard de Vinci, school located at Saint-Thibault-des-Vignes is added on the line 21.

On January 15, 2024, a new stop called Artisans is created in Chessy opposite the existing one in the opposite direction, served by lines 23, 24 and 43 coming from Marne-la-Vallée–Chessy station.

==== Network renaming ====
As of April 22, 2024, Marne-la-Vallée network will apply the new single regional numbering principle planned by Île-de-France Mobilités, removing duplicates. The correspondence between old and new numbers is as follows:

Network renaming
Old	New
42	2220
21	2221
22	2222
23	2223
02	2224
25	2225
26	2226
48	2228
29	2229
47	2231
43	2233
34	2234
35	2235
44	2244
27	2245
4	2250
12	2251
7	2252
37a	2253
37b	2254
60	2260
57	2261
06	2262
24	2263
14	2264
20a	2280
20b	2281
20c	2282
20d	2283
20e	2284
13	2290
15	2291
32	2292

==== Following network renaming ====
Following the renaming of the network, the Demand-responsive transport (DRT) of Marne-la-Vallée called TàD Marne-la-Vallée is replaced by four night lines.

In late 2024, new bus stops were created.

== Routes ==
=== Main routes ===
Image	Line	First direction	Second direction
	2220	Gare de Lagny - Thorigny	Gare de Val d'Europe
	2221	Gare de Lagny - Thorigny	Gare de Torcy
	2222	Gare de Bussy-Saint-Georges	Gare de Val d'Europe
	2223	Gare de Lagny - Thorigny	Gare de Marne-la-Vallée - Chessy
	2224	Gare de Lagny - Thorigny	Gare de Val d'Europe
	2225	Gare de Lagny - Thorigny	Gare de Torcy
	2226	Gare de Lagny - Thorigny	Gare de Bussy-Saint-Georges
	2228	Gare de Val d'Europe	Gare de Torcy
	2229	Gare de Lagny - Thorigny	Gare de Torcy
	2231	Gare de Marne-la-Vallée - Chessy	Bailly-Romainvilliers — Villages Nature
	2233	Gare de Marne-la-Vallée - Chessy	Gare de Val d'Europe
	2234	Gare de Marne-la-Vallée - Chessy	Gare de Val d'Europe
	2235	Gare de Marne-la-Vallée - Chessy	Bailly-Romainvilliers — Ecole Les Girandoles
	2244	Gare de Bussy-Saint-Georges (circular line)	
	2245	Gare de Bussy-Saint-Georges (circular line)	
	2250	Gare de Lagny - Thorigny (circular line)	
	2251	Gare de Lagny - Thorigny (circular line)	
	2252	Gare de Lagny - Thorigny (circular line)	
	2253	Gare de Lagny - Thorigny (circular line)	
	2254	Gare de Lagny - Thorigny (circular line)	
	2260	Gare de Val d'Europe	Quincy-Voisins — Philo
	2261	Gare de Marne-la-Vallée - Chessy	Gare d'Esbly
	2262	Gare de Marne-la-Vallée - Chessy	Gare d'Esbly
	2263	Gare de Marne-la-Vallée - Chessy	Jablines — Île de Loisirs
	2264	Saint-Germain-sur-Morin — Collège Stéphane Hessel	Jablines — Île de Loisirs
	2280	Lagny-sur-Marne — E.S. Saint-Laurent-La-Paix - Notre Dame	Chelles — Les Martyrs
	2281	Lagny-sur-Marne — E.S. Saint-Laurent-La-Paix - Notre Dame	Champs-sur-Marne — Place Mattéoti; Gournay — Eglise
	2282	Lagny-sur-Marne — E.S. Saint-Laurent-La-Paix - Notre Dame	Château de Champs-sur-Marne
	2283	Lagny-sur-Marne — E.S. Saint-Laurent-La-Paix - Notre Dame	Noisiel — Les Provinces
	2284	Lagny-sur-Marne — E.S. Saint-Laurent-La-Paix - Notre Dame	Croissy-Beaubourg — Les Lions de Beaubourg; Gare d'Émerainville - Pontault-Combault
	2290	Gare de Torcy	Gare d'Ozoir-la-Ferrière
	2291	Gare de Lagny - Thorigny	Claye-Souilly — Mairie
	2292	Gare de Val d'Europe	Gare de Tournan

=== Night routes ===
From April 22, 2024, the network is completed with four night lines called Soirée Bussy-Saint-Georges, Soirée Val d'Europe, Soirée Marne-la-Vallée and Soirée Lagny-Thorigny, these night lines replaced the demand-resposive transport.

Image	Line
	Soirée Bussy-Saint-Georges
	Soirée Lagny-Thorigny
	Soirée Marne-la-Vallée
	Soirée Val d'Europe

=== Demand-responsive transport ===
The network operated a demand-responsive transport named TAD Marne-la-Vallée.

On April 22, 2024, the service ceased his operations and was replaced by four night lines.

== See also ==
- Île-de-France Mobilités
- Disneyland Paris
