= Val d'Europe station =

Railway station in Serris, France

Serris–Montévrain Val d'Europe
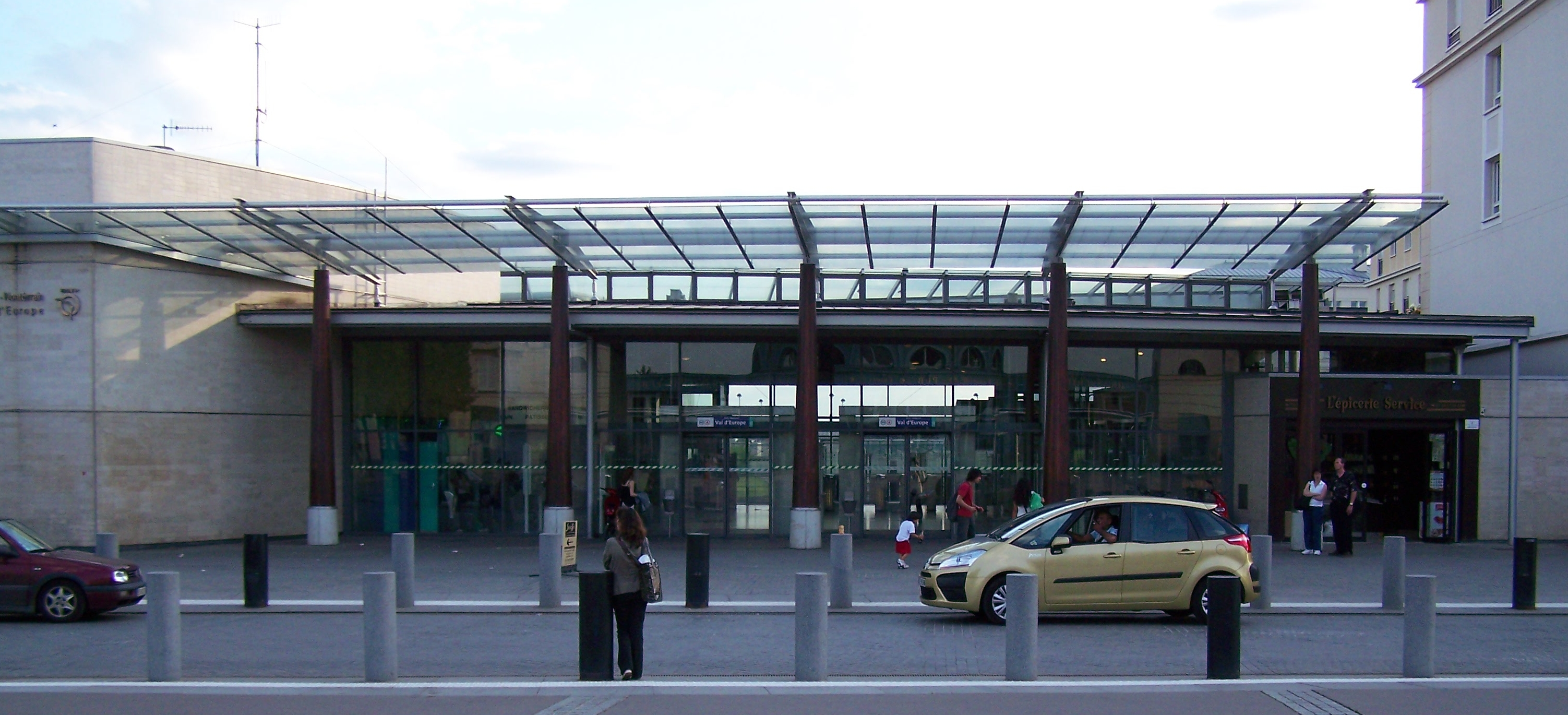
- Main entrance at the east side of the station (serving Val d'Europe shopping centre).

General information
- Location: Place d'Ariane; Val d'Europe; France
- Coordinates: 48°51′19″N 2°46′24″E
- Operator: RATP Group
- Platforms: 2 side platforms
- Tracks: 2

Construction
- Structure type: Below-grade
- Parking: 633 spaces
- Cycle facilities: Parking station
- Accessible: Yes, by request to staff

Other information
- Station code: 87730069
- Fare zone: 5

History
- Opened: 14 April 2001

Passengers
- 2019: 4,656,709

Services
Preceding station	RER	Following station
Bussy-Saint-Georges towards Cergy-le-Haut	RER A	Marne-la-Vallée–Chessy Terminus
Location

Val d'Europe station is a railway station on the RER A line in Val d'Europe, the eastmost part of the new town of Marne-la-Vallée.

The station's full name is Serris – Montévrain – Val d'Europe, a recognition that the station serves more specifically the communes of Serris and Montévrain. The station also serves the nearby neighbourhoods of Chessy and Jossigny and the large shopping mall of Val d'Europe.

== History ==
The district of Val d'Europe was planned and developed in conjunction with The Walt Disney Company, who wished to create a new town near the Disneyland Paris resort. Thus, on 1 April 1992, RER line A was extended to Marne-la-Vallée – Chessy to serve Disneyland Paris.

To achieve the objective of better serving the communes of the Val d'Europe, which was then in full expansion, and the Val d'Europe mall newly established, Val d'Europe station was built as an infill station on the already operating RER line and opened on 14 April 2001.

== Traffic ==
Val d'Europe station has seen its ridership increase, in ten years, from zero to three million passengers in 2011.

As of 2019, the estimated annual attendance by the RATP Group was 4,656,709 passengers.

== Services ==
The station has three accesses :

- the first one towards Serris and Chessy, the shopping mall and the bus station;
- the second one towards Montévrain;
- and the third one towards the hospital of Jossigny.

=== RER A ===
The station is served by a train every 10 minutes to Paris and to Marne-la-Vallée–Chessy. From 10 pm, frequency drops to 1 train every 30 minutes. Service starts at 5:16 am to Paris, at 5:53 am to Marne-la-Vallée–Chessy and stops at 0:23 am to Paris and at 1:13 to Marne-la-Vallée–Chessy.

=== Bus connections ===
The station is served by several buses:

- Marne-la-Vallée: 2220 2222 2224 2228 2233 2234 2260 2292
- Pays Briard: 7716
- Noctilien: N130

== Gallery ==
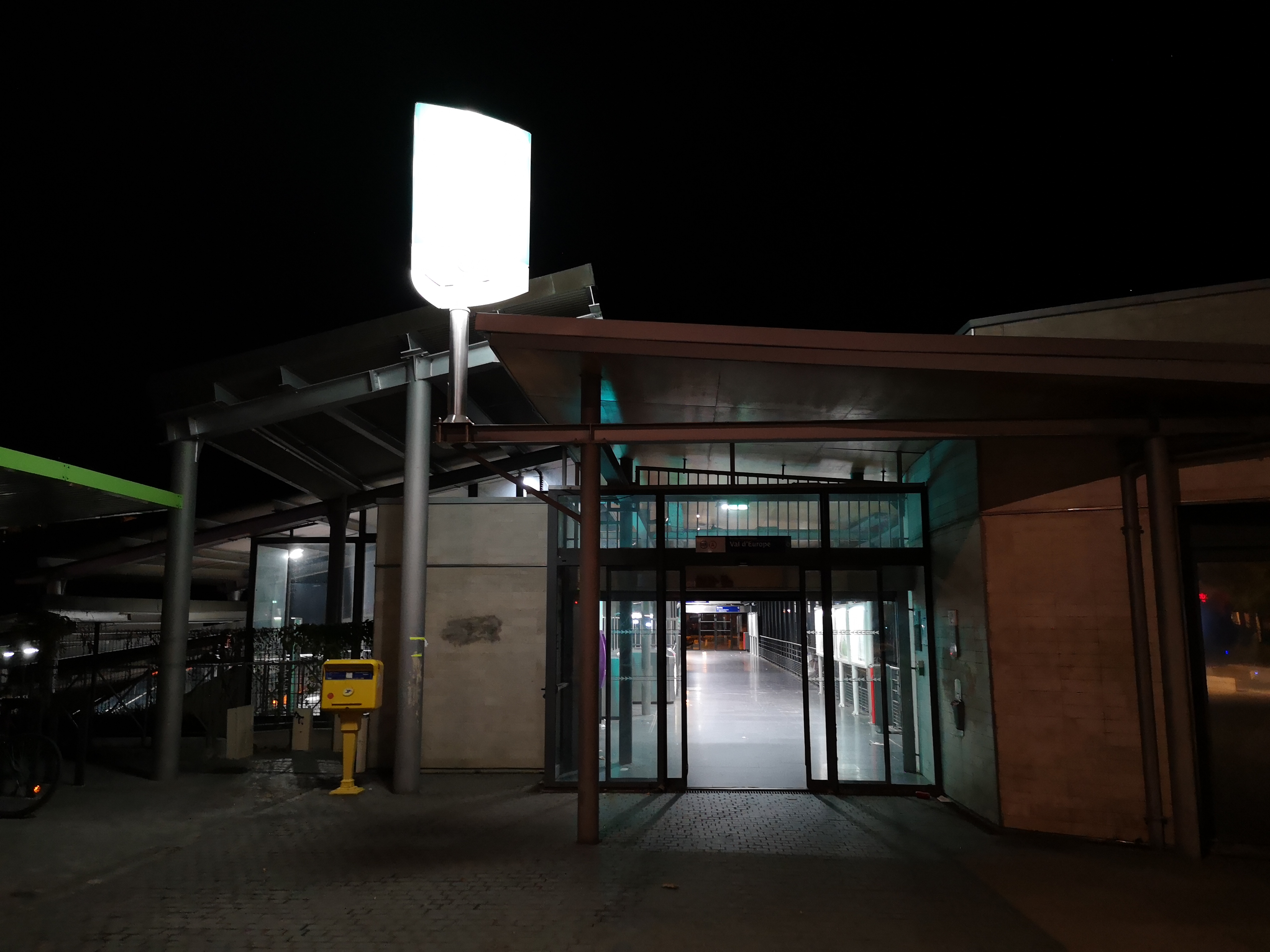
West side entrance in the evening
(serving neighbourhoods of Montévrain)

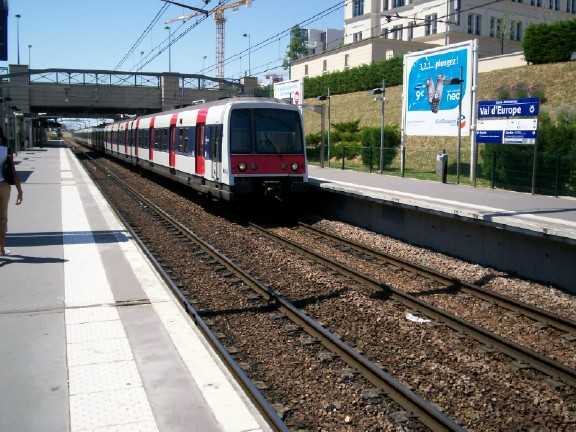
Train MI 84 arriving at the station
(towards Marne-la-Vallée–Chessy)
and sign indicating the name of the station

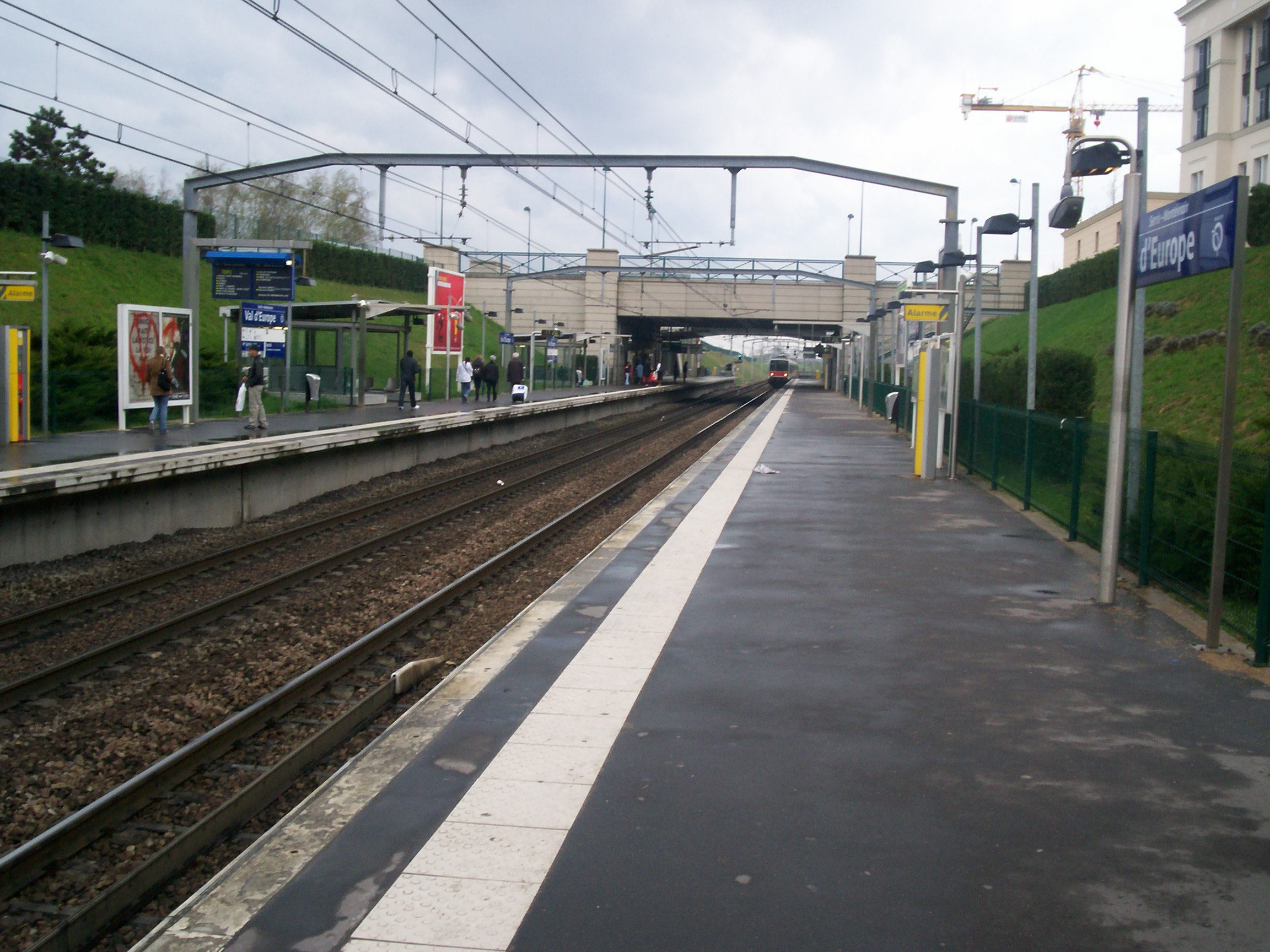
General view to the west
(towards Paris)
from the halfway point of the station.

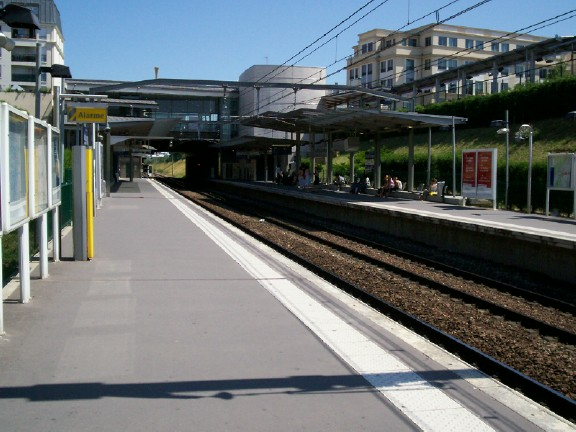
General view to the east
(towards Marne-la-Vallée–Chessy)
from the halfway point of the station.
