= Mission code =

French train service identifier

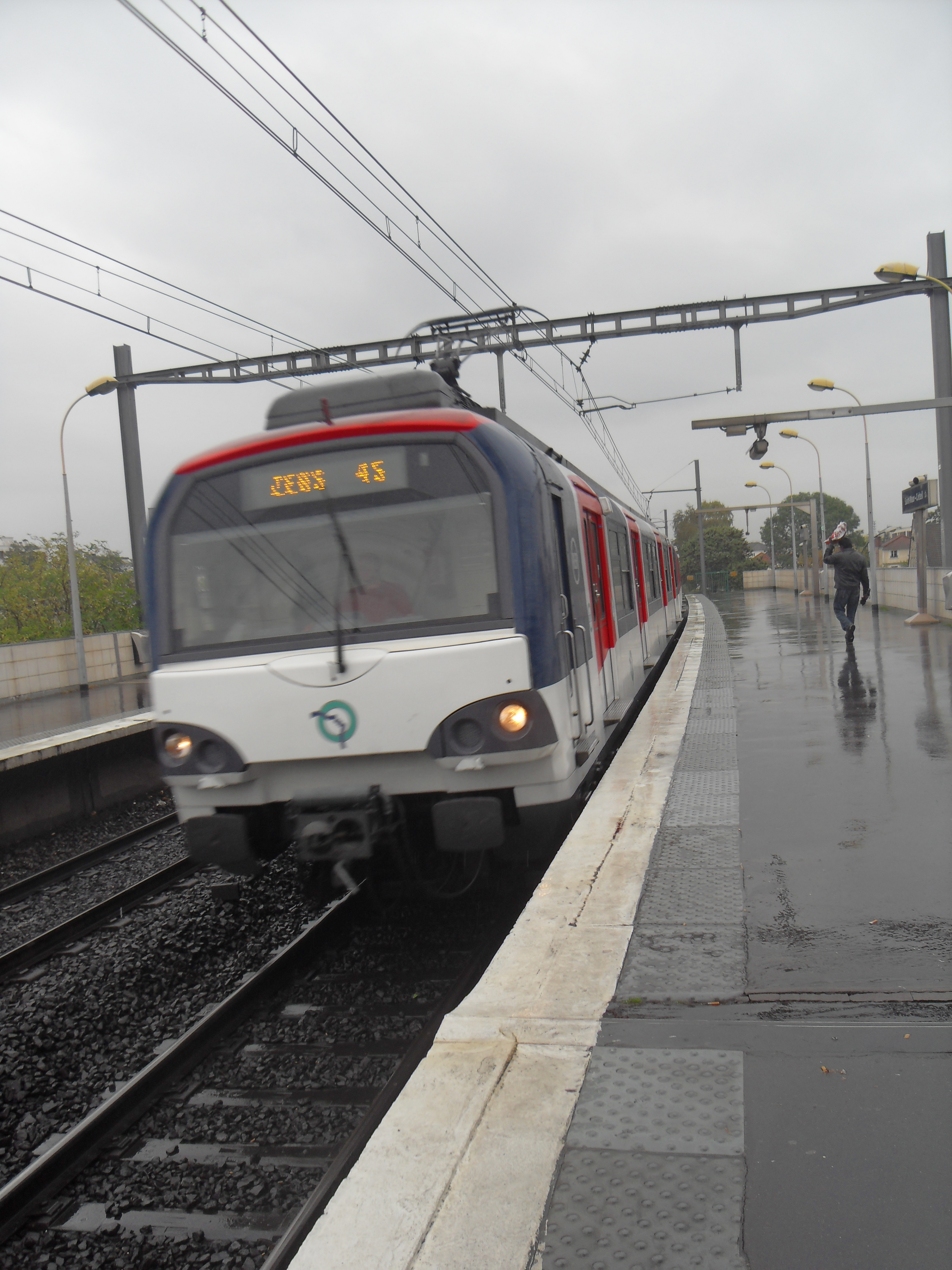
An MS 61 displaying the ZEUS mission code, indicating that it terminates at Saint-Germain-en-Laye, arriving at Saint-Maur–Créteil, 2009

A mission code (French: code mission) is the term applied to a system used on the French railway network to identify particular train services.

Mission code's are designed to provide information to passengers about trains. A mission code consists of up to four letters which represent an acronym for a given train's destination and route. On the Réseau Express Régional the first letter of the mission code is taken from the initial of the destination station, the second represents the service, the third letter is the initial's of the original departure station, and the fourth letter defines the route. On some lines, such as Line J, the fourth letter of the mission code does not relay information about the service but is included as a memory aide. Mission code's were first introduced the C line which now has 155 variants.

== In popular culture ==
The tag of the French graffiti artist Zevs was inspired by the mission code ZEUS, a mission code on the A line, which was displayed on a train that almost ran him over as a teenager.

== See also ==
- Reporting mark
- Train reporting number
- Train reporting number (Australia)
