= Torcy station =

Railway station in Torcy, France

Torcy
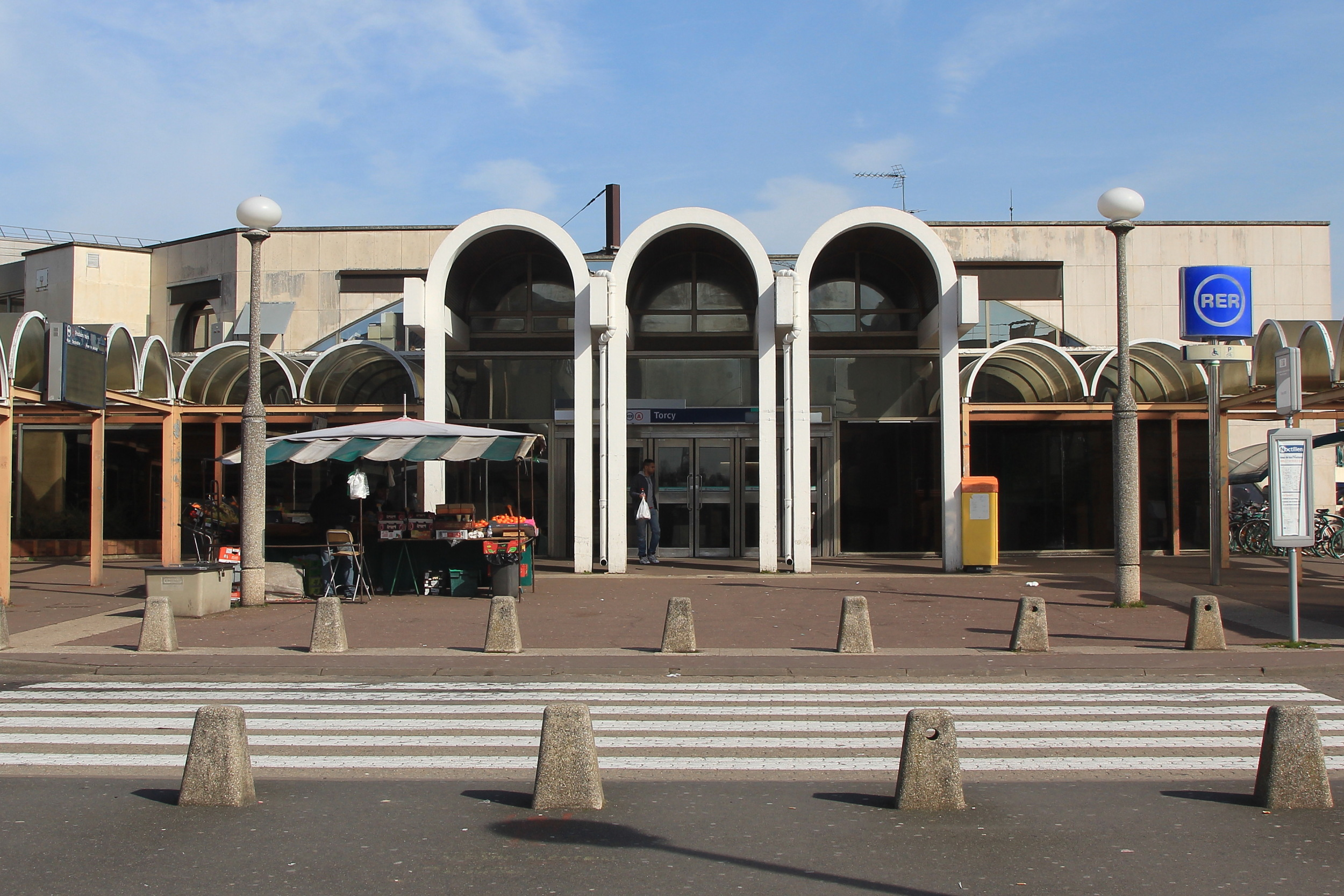
- Main entrance at south side (towards the bus station and Bay 2 shopping centre).

General information
- Location: 1 Place de la Gare; Torcy; France
- Coordinates: 48°50′22″N 2°39′17″E
- Operator: RATP Group
- Platforms: 1 island platform 1 side platform
- Tracks: 3

Construction
- Structure type: Below-grade
- Parking: Yes
- Accessible: Yes, by request to staff

Other information
- Station code: 87758375
- Fare zone: 5

History
- Opened: 19 December 1980

Passengers
- 2019: 4,223,220

Services
Preceding station	RER	Following station
Lognes towards Cergy-le-Haut	RER A	Bussy-Saint-Georges towards Marne-la-Vallée–Chessy
Location

Torcy station (French pronunciation: [toʁsi]) is a railway station in Torcy, Seine-et-Marne, a suburb east of Paris.

== History ==
Torcy opened on 19 December 1980 as part of an extension of the A4 branch from its previous eastern terminal of Noisy-le-Grand–Mont d'Est. It served as the eastern terminus of the A4 branch for twelve years until 1 April 1992, when the RER A4 was extended to Marne-la-Vallée–Chessy; since then, the A4 branch has yet to be extended.

== Traffic ==
As of 2019, the estimated annual attendance by the RATP Group was 4,223,220 passengers.

== Service ==
Torcy is on the A4 branch of the RER A and receives frequent service. As of 4 February 2008, during peak hours there are between twelve and eighteen trains per hour (intervals of five and three minutes and twenty seconds), during mid-day trains arrive every ten minutes, and early mornings and late nights trains come at fifteen-minute intervals.

The station acts as a terminus for certain trains. Trains that terminate at Torcy will display a headline beginning with O, O being the designation that a train terminates at Torcy rather than Q for Marne-la-Vallée–Chessy.

=== Bus connections ===
The station is served by several buses:

- RATP Bus: 211 220 311 421
- Marne-la-Vallée: 2221 2225 2228 2229 2290
- Pays Briard: 3118
- Noctilien: N34 N130

== Gallery ==
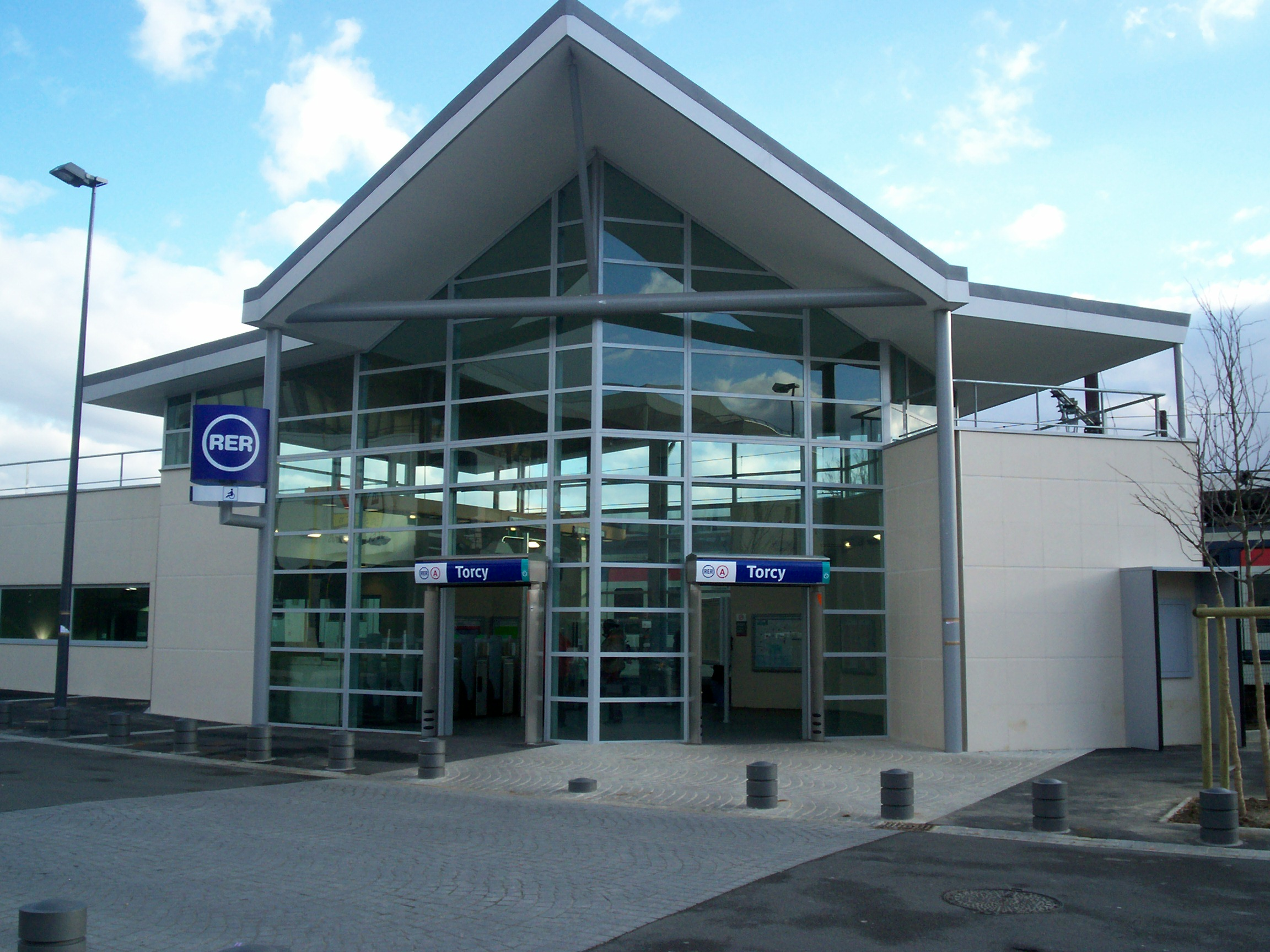
North side entrance
(towards Bay 1 shopping centre)

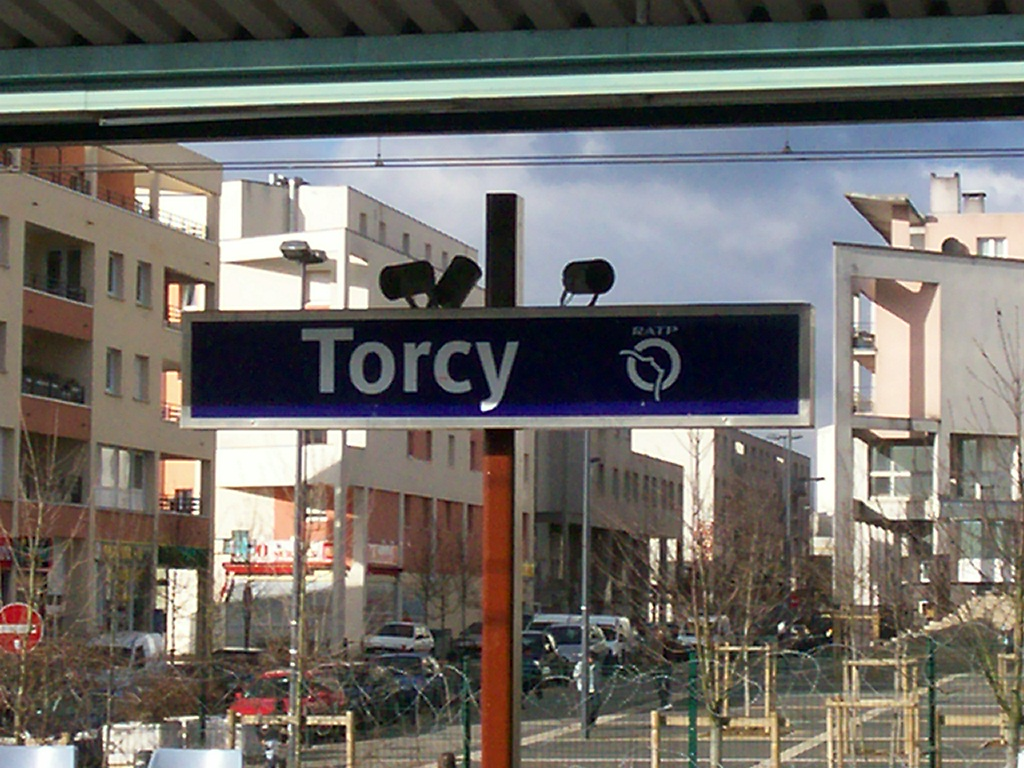
Sign indicating the name of the station
(with overlooking the neighbourhood)

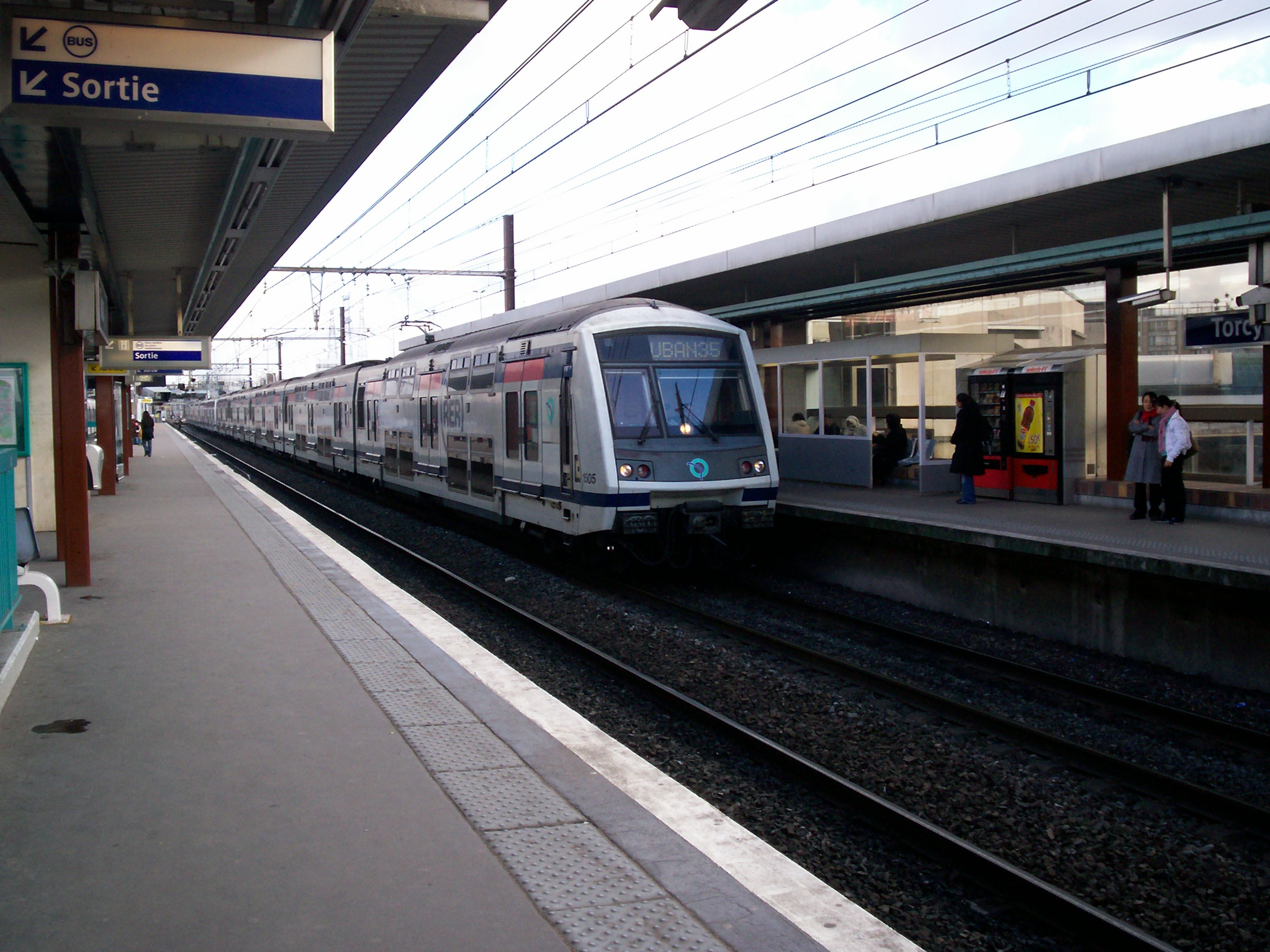
A train (MI2N) arriving at the station
(towards Paris)

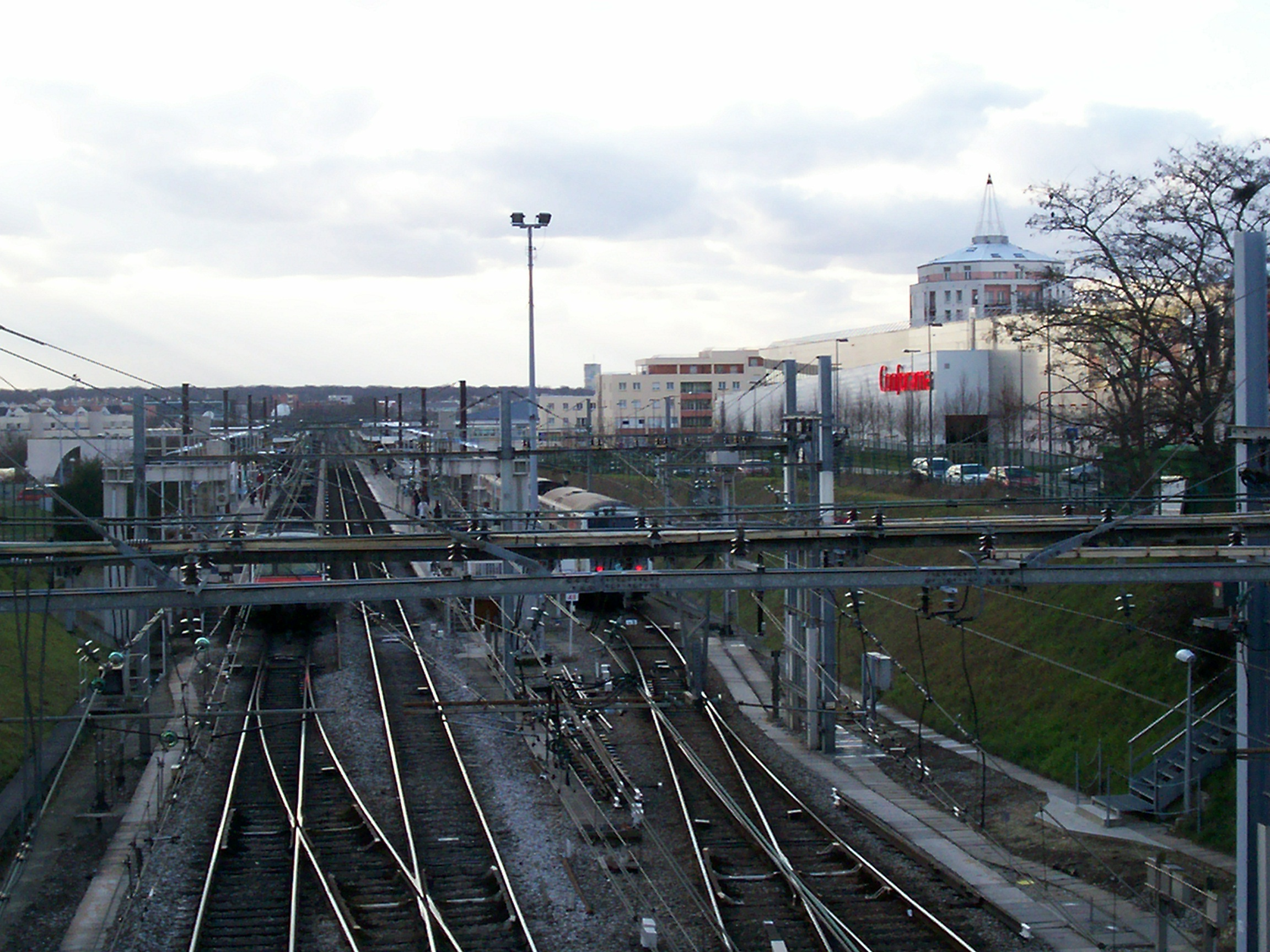
General view to the west (towards Paris)
from the east side of the station

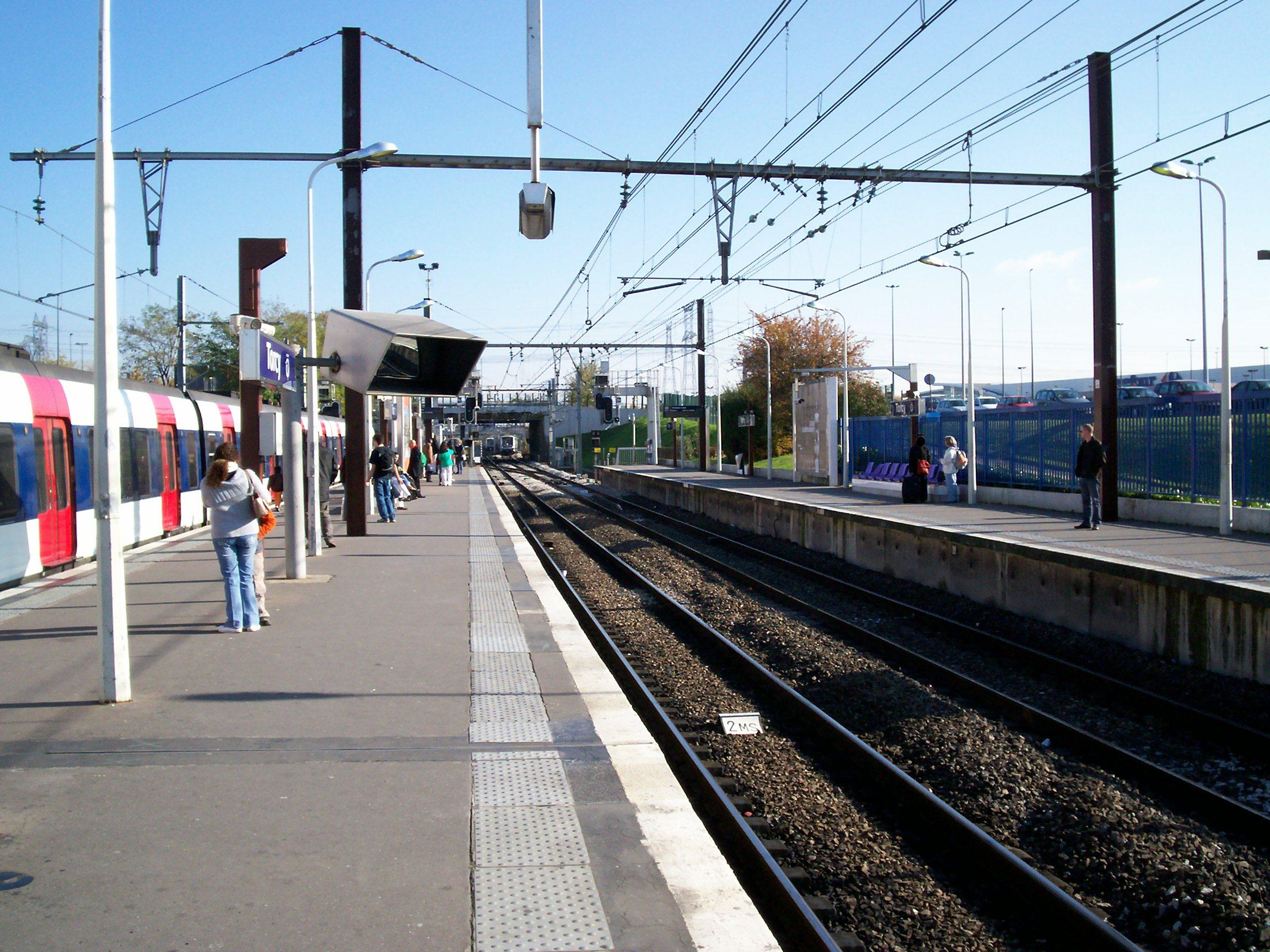
General view of the platforms to the east
(towards Marne-la-Vallée–Chessy)

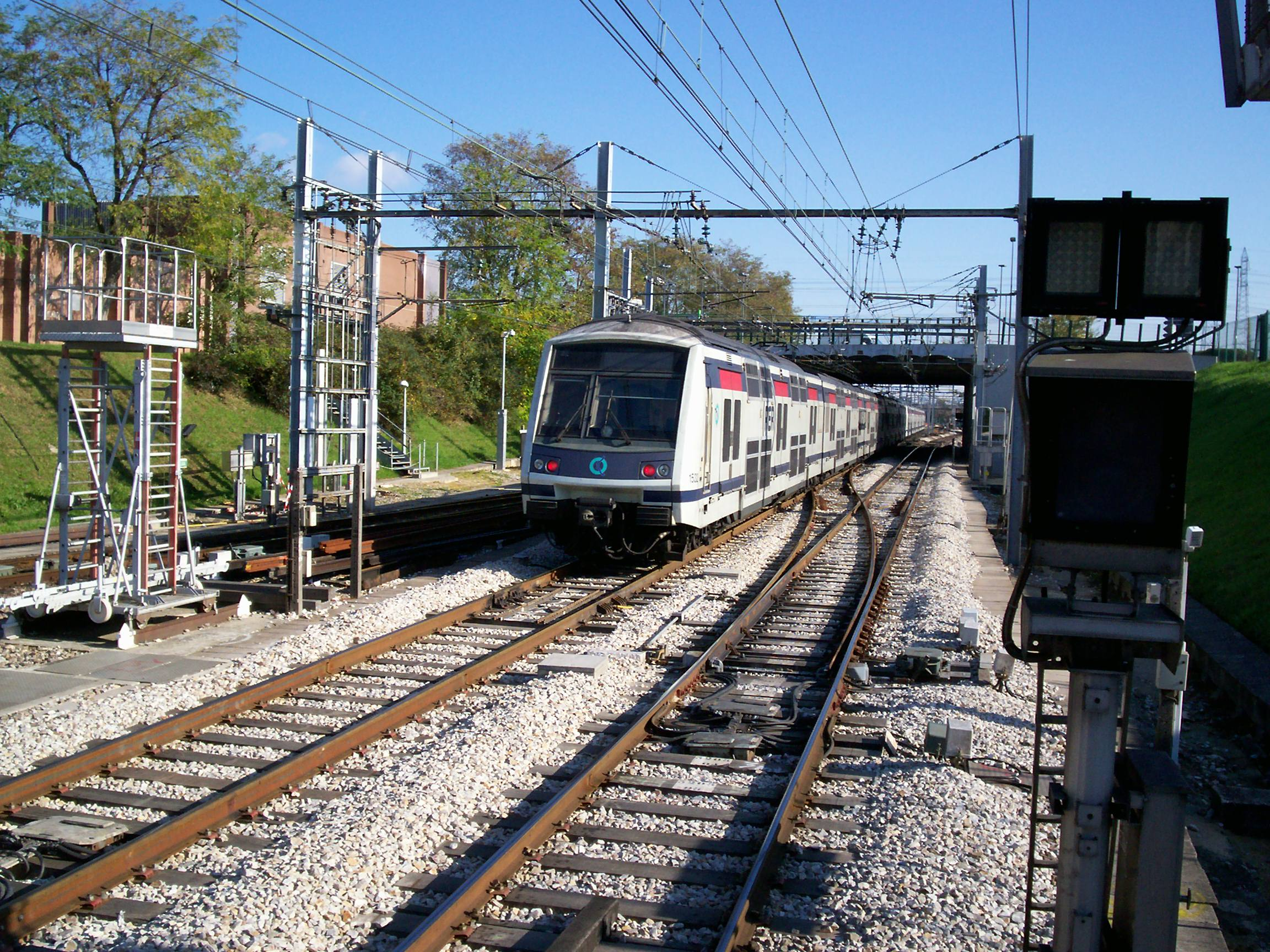
General view to the east (with a MI2N train
that has just left the station)
