= Vaires–Torcy station =

Railway station in Vaires-sur-Marne, France

Vaires–Torcy
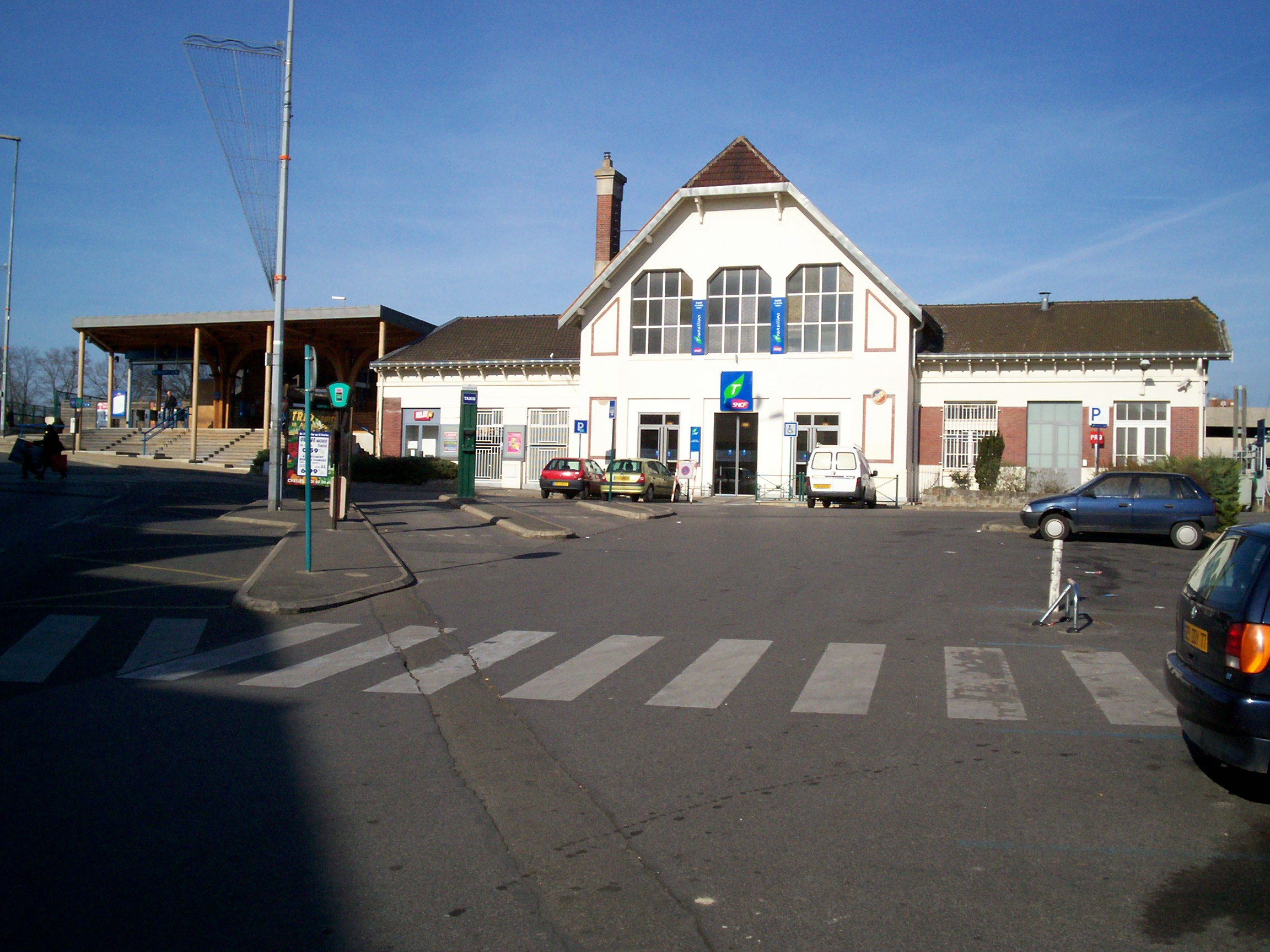

General information
- Location: Place du Général de Gaulle; 77360 Vaires-sur-Marne, France
- Coordinates: 48.875289°N 2.639791°E
- Owner: SNCF
- Operator: SNCF
- Line: Paris-Est–Strasbourg-Ville railway
- Platforms: 2
- Tracks: 4

Construction
- Accessible: Yes, by request to staff

Other information
- Station code: 87116293
- Fare zone: 5

History
- Opened: 12 January 1898

Passengers
- 2024: 2,266,354

Services
Preceding station	Transilien	Following station
Chelles–Gournay towards Paris-Est	Line P	Lagny–Thorigny towards Meaux
Location

Vaires–Torcy station is a railway station in Vaires-sur-Marne, Seine-et-Marne, Île-de-France, France. The station opened in 1898 and is on the Paris–Strasbourg railway and the start of the LGV Est. The station is served by Transilien Line P (East Paris) services operated by SNCF.

== History ==
Between 2001 and 2003 the station was rebuilt to make way for the LGV Est, which included the building of new entrances to the station.

== Train services ==
The station is served by the following service(s):

- Regional services (Transilien Line P) Paris-Est–Meaux

=== Bus connections ===
The station is served by several buses:

- RATP Bus: 311 421
- Marne-la-Vallée: 2280
- Noctilien: N141

== Gallery ==
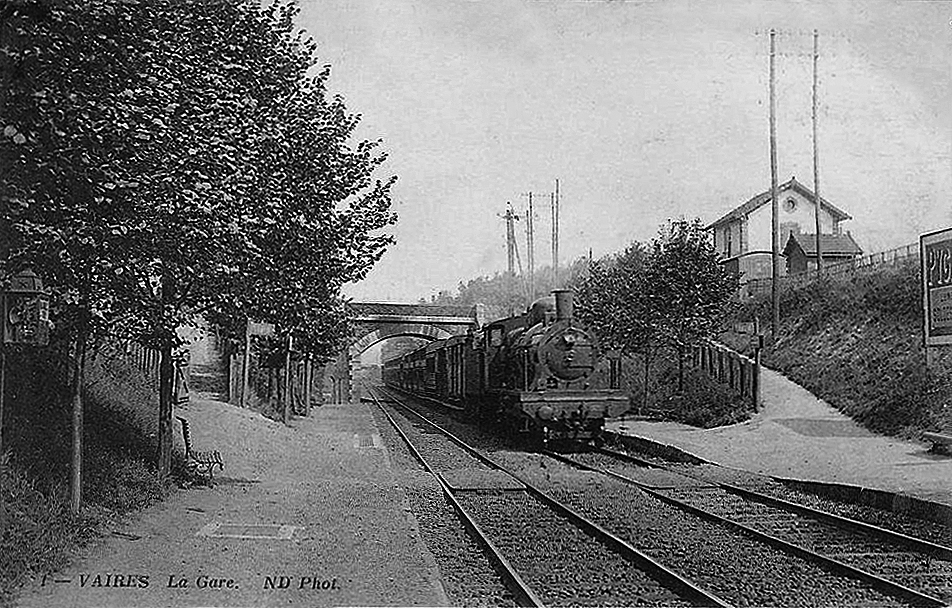
The station in the 1910s.

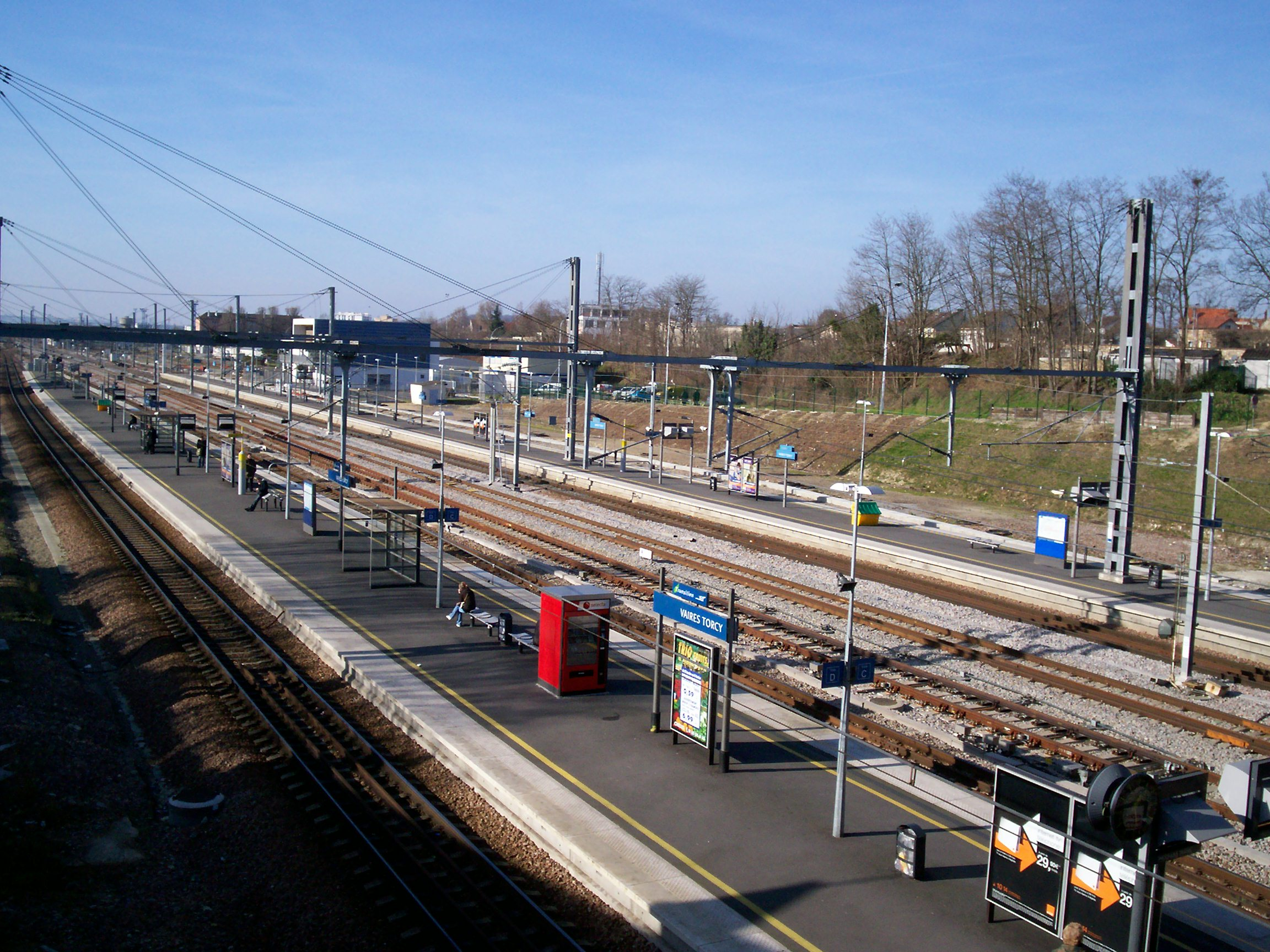
The station in 2007.

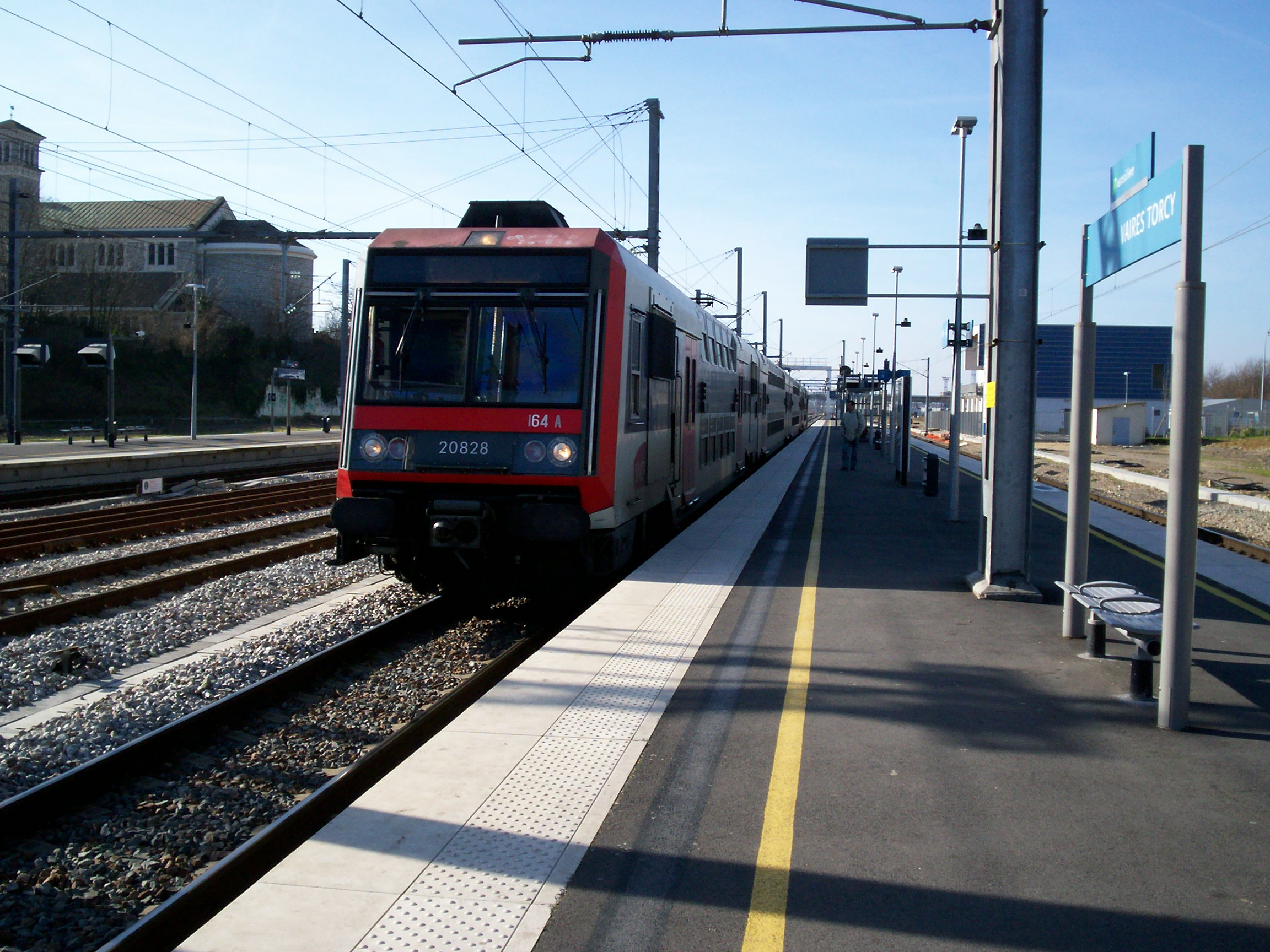
A Z 20500 train to Meaux.
