= RER A =

Hybrid suburban commuter railway line in Paris, France

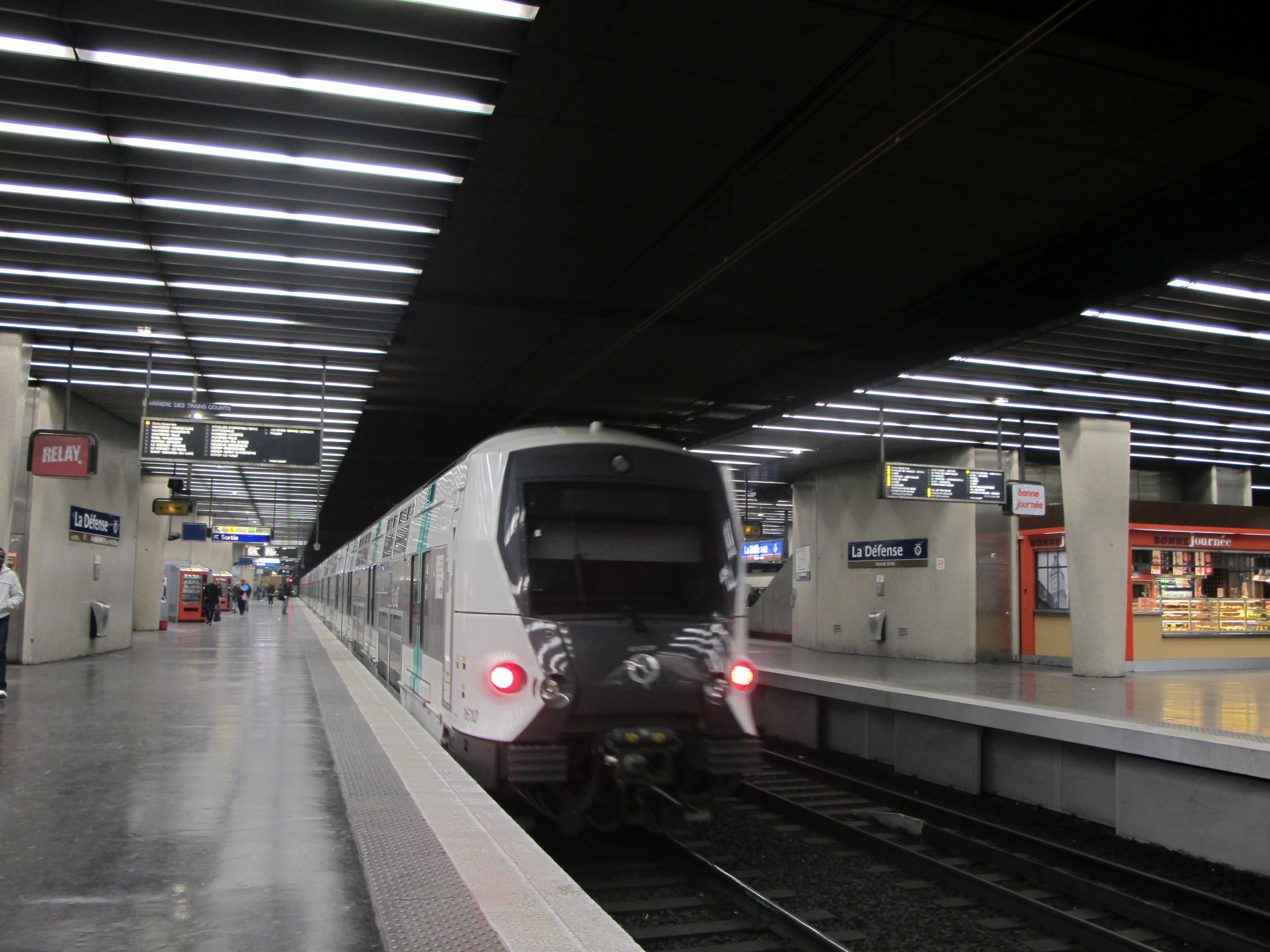
- RER A train at the underground La Défense station

Overview
- Termini: Saint-Germain-en-Laye (A1), Cergy-le-Haut (A3), Poissy (A5); Boissy-Saint-Léger (A2), Marne-la-Vallée–Chessy (A4)
- Connecting lines: Paris Metro Paris Metro Line 1 Paris Metro Line 2 Paris Metro Line 3 Paris Metro Line 4 Paris Metro Line 6 Paris Metro Line 7 Paris Metro Line 8 Paris Metro Line 9 Paris Metro Line 11 Paris Metro Line 14 RER RER B RER D RER E Transilien Transilien Line J (Paris-Saint-Lazare) Transilien Line L (Paris-Saint-Lazare) Transilien Line R (Paris-Gare-de-Lyon) Transilien Line U Tramways in Île-de-France Île-de-France tramway Line 2 Île-de-France tramway Line 13
- Stations: 46

Service
- Type: Rapid transit/commuter rail
- System: Réseau Express Régional
- Operator: RATP/SNCF
- Rolling stock: MI 2N, MI 09
- Ridership: 300 million journeys per year

History
- Opened: 8 December 1977; 48 years ago
- Last extension: 1994

Technical
- Line length: 108.5 km (67.4 mi)
- Track gauge: 1,435 mm (4 ft 8 1/2 in) standard gauge
- Electrification: Overhead line: 25 kV 50 Hz AC; 1,500 V DC
Route map

RER A is one of the five lines in the Réseau Express Régional (English: Regional Express Network), a hybrid commuter rail and rapid transit system serving the city and suburbs of Paris, France. The 108.5-kilometre (67.4 mi) line crosses the region from east to west, with all trains serving a group of stations in central Paris, before branching out towards the ends of the line.

The initial portion of the line was built in stages between December 1969 and December 1977 by connecting two existing suburban commuter rail lines with a new tunnel under Paris: the line between Vincennes and Boissy-Saint-Léger in the east (which formerly terminated at the now-closed Gare de la Bastille), and the line between Saint-Germain-en-Laye and Nanterre in the west (which formerly used a surface alignment to the Gare Saint-Lazare that is still in use as Transilien L). The viaduct between Vincennes and the former Gare de la Bastille terminus was redeveloped into the Promenade plantée elevated park in 1993.

Since its opening, three additional branches have been added: one in the east serving Marne-la-Vallée and Disneyland Paris, and two to the west serving Poissy and Cergy.

The RER A has had a significant social impact on Paris and the surrounding region by speeding up trips across central Paris (by making far fewer stops than the Paris Metro) and by bringing far-flung suburbs within easy reach of the city centre. The line has far exceeded all traffic expectations, currently serving over 1.2 million passengers per day, on about 300 million journeys per year. It is one of the busiest rapid transit lines in Europe.

== Popular success and responses ==
The line has far exceeded all traffic expectations, currently serving over 1.2 million passengers per day, on about 300 million journeys per year. It has been argued that this makes the RER A the busiest single rail line outside of East Asia. Ever-increasing traffic volume and the need to ward off imminent saturation have been major factors in RATP and SNCF's planning since the inauguration of the line.

Several major capital investments have been made to relieve overcrowding on the line:

- The line's traditional signalling block system, which allowed only one train to occupy a "block" of track, was replaced in September 1989 with a dynamic traffic control system. The Système d'aide à la conduite, à l'exploitation et à la maintenance or SACEM (English: Driver Assistance, Operation, and Maintenance System) enables extremely short spacing between trains, increasing capacity on the line. The SACEM system is scheduled to be replaced in the mid-to-late 2020s with an even more advanced communications-based train control system.
- Paris Metro Line 14, which opened on 15 October 1998, was built on a route that would relieve congestion on the segment of RER A that passes through central Paris.
- RER E, which opened on 14 July 1999, was built on a route that would also serve the eastern suburbs of Paris, and an 8 km (5.0 mi) tunnel has been built under central Paris that connects the RER E to La Défense. The extension will continue past La Défense to allow the RER E to take over the branch of the RER A to Poissy. The project is expected to reduce the load on the central section of the RER A by 10-15%.
- Double-deck trains (MI 2N series) entered service in 1998 to increase the passenger-carrying capacity on each run of the RER A. The 43 double-deck trains can carry up to 2,600 people per train, compared to 1,887 people on the older single-deck MS 61 trains. The double-deck trains proved so successful and popular that RATP placed an order for 140 MI 09 double-deck trains that entered service in 2011, and has replaced all the remaining single-deck trains on the RER A.

== Chronology ==
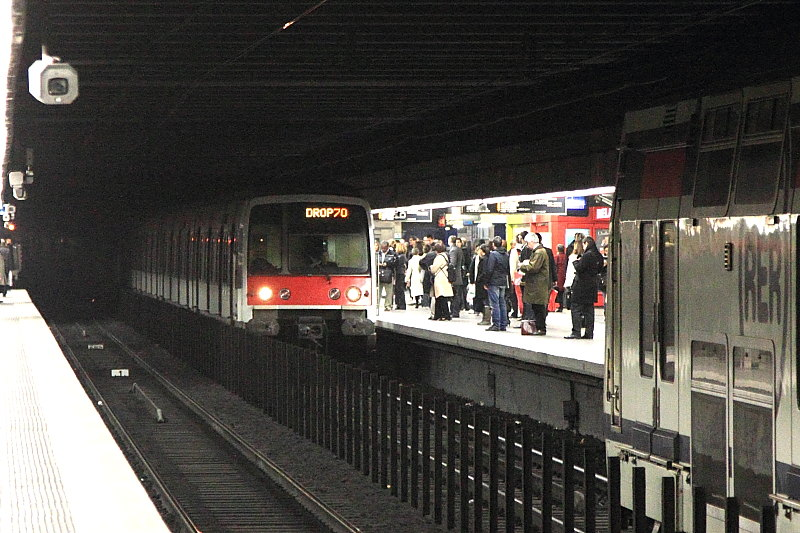
A train arriving at Auber while the previous one has not completely cleared the platform, caused by the rapid pace of SACEM. The train displays the mission code DROP signifying that its destination is Dourdan.

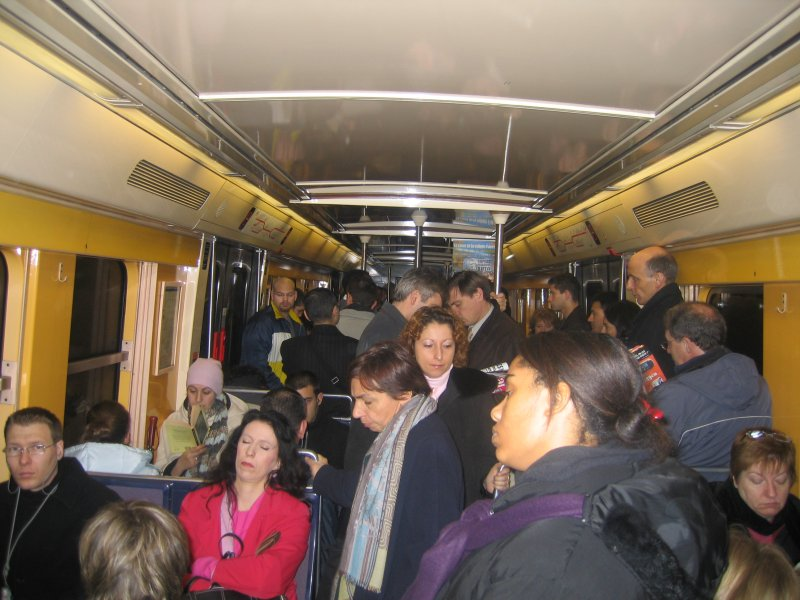
The interior of an MI 84 whilst in operation

- 6 July 1961: The first planning begins for a tunnel under Paris to connect Étoile to the new La Défense business district. These plans would go on to become the much more ambitious RER A.
- 14 December 1969: The first Regional Metro segment begins service after RATP purchases the Ligne de Vincennes between Bastille and Boissy-Saint-Léger from SNCF and connects it to a new 2.5 km (1.6 mi) tunnel under Paris between Vincennes and Nation, which replaces Bastille as the terminus. This creates a 17.5 km (10.9 mi) eastern line between Nation and Boissy-Saint-Léger.
- 19 January 1970: A 4 km (2.5 mi) tunnel opens between Étoile and La Défense. Since this tunnel is isolated from the other section, it is operated as a navette (shuttle) service.
- 23 November 1971: The tunnel is extended 2 km (1.2 mi) east to Auber. The shuttle service is extended to operate between La Défense and Auber.
- 1 October 1972: The second Regional Metro segment opens as RATP purchases the Ligne de Saint-Germain between Nanterre-Université and Saint-Germain-en-Laye from SNCF and connects it to a new 2 km (1.2 mi) tunnel to La Défense. This creates a 13 km (8.1 mi) western line between Saint-Germain-en-Laye and Auber.
- 1 October 1973: The new infill underground Nanterre–Préfecture station opens.
- 8 December 1977: The Regional Metro becomes RER A as the final 6 km (3.7 mi) segment under Paris is completed, adding two new underground stations: Gare de Lyon and Châtelet–Les Halles. A portion of this new tunnel is shared with the Ligne de Sceaux, which becomes RER B. The newly linked segments create a 42.5 km (26.4 mi) line between Saint-Germain-en-Laye and Boissy-Saint-Léger. At the same time, the first segment of the Ligne nouvelle de Marne-la-Vallée (English: New line of Marne-la-Vallée) opens. This new 8.5 km (5.3 mi) branch extends the line east to Noisy-le-Grand-Mont d’Est.
- 19 December 1980: The Ligne nouvelle de Marne-la-Vallée is extended 9 km (5.6 mi) to Torcy.
- 29 May 1988: An "Interconnexion Ouest" (English: West Interconnection) branch is added, extending trains 15.5 km (9.6 mi) northwest on SNCF tracks from Nanterre-Préfecture to Cergy-Saint-Christophe.
- 29 May 1989: A 8.5 km (5.3 mi) branch is added off the "Interconnexion Ouest" connecting Maisons-Laffitte and Poissy.
- 1 April 1992: The Ligne nouvelle de Marne-la-Vallée is completed with a 11 km (6.8 mi) extension to Marne-la-Vallée–Chessy, creating a link to Disneyland Paris – which opens on 12 April 1992.
- 29 August 1994: The line is extended 2.5 km (1.6 mi) west to Cergy-le-Haut, new Neuville-Université station opens.
- 10 June 2001: The new Val d'Europe station opens.

== List of RER A stations ==
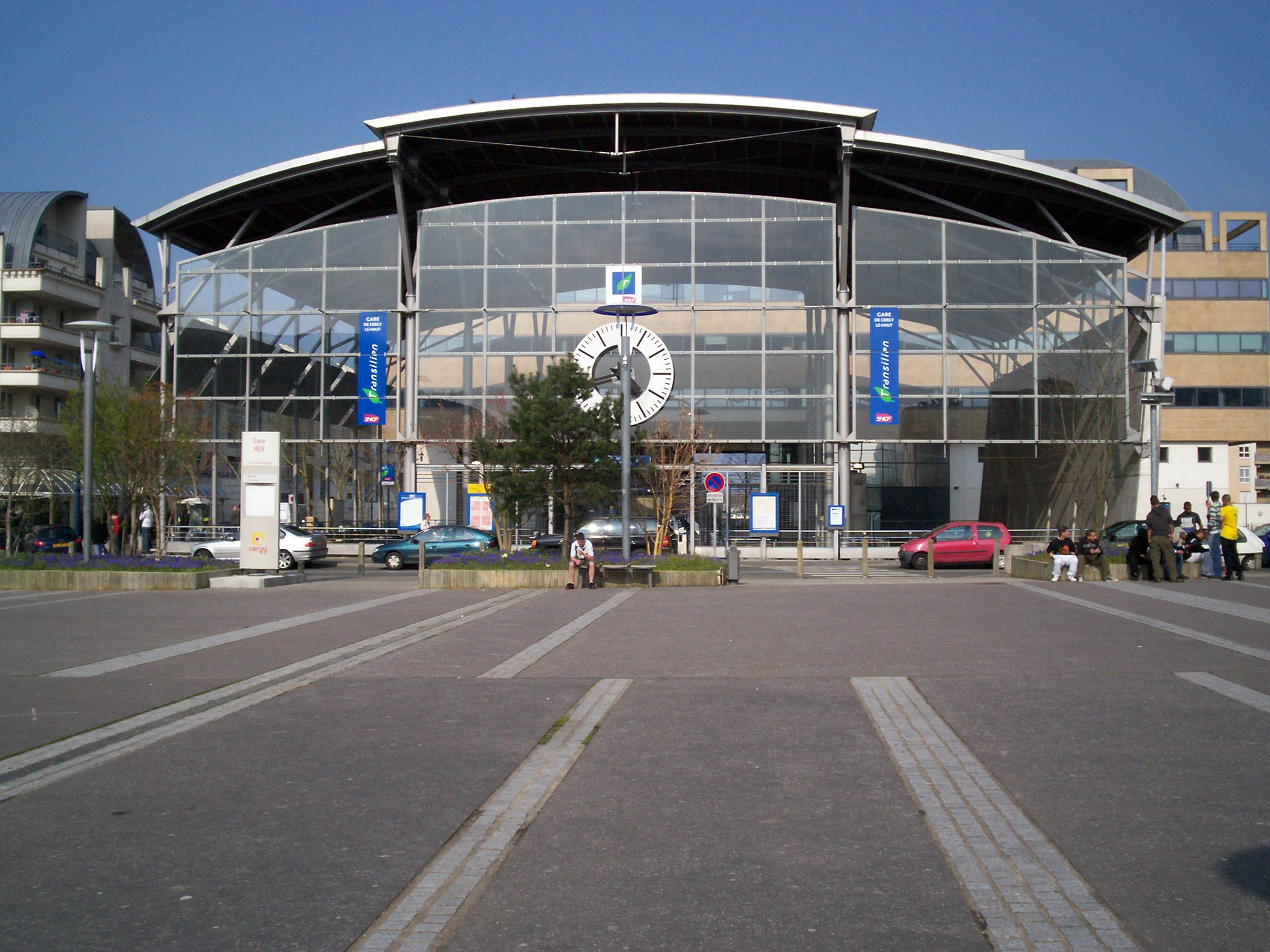
Cergy-le-Haut

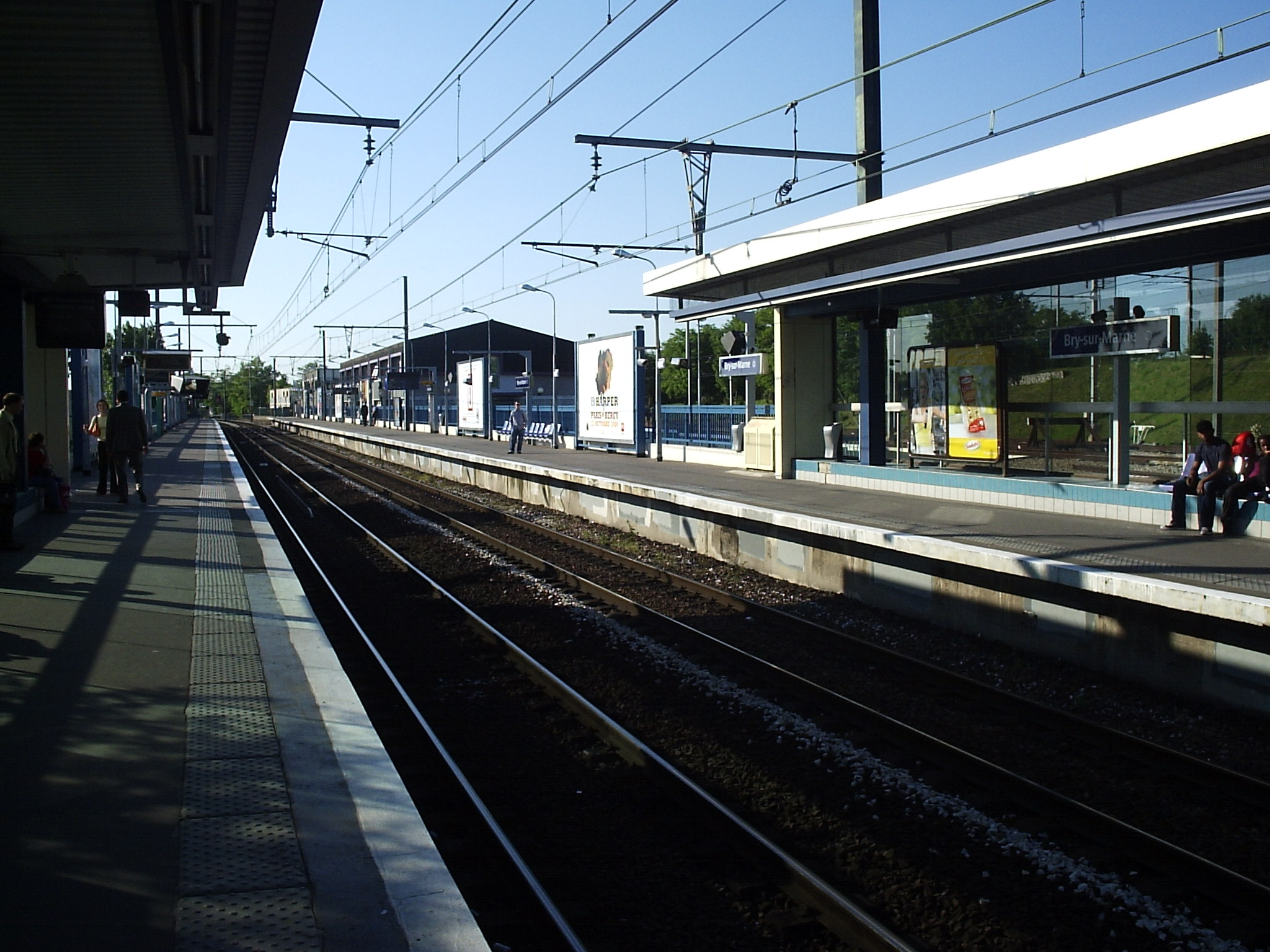
Bry-sur-Marne

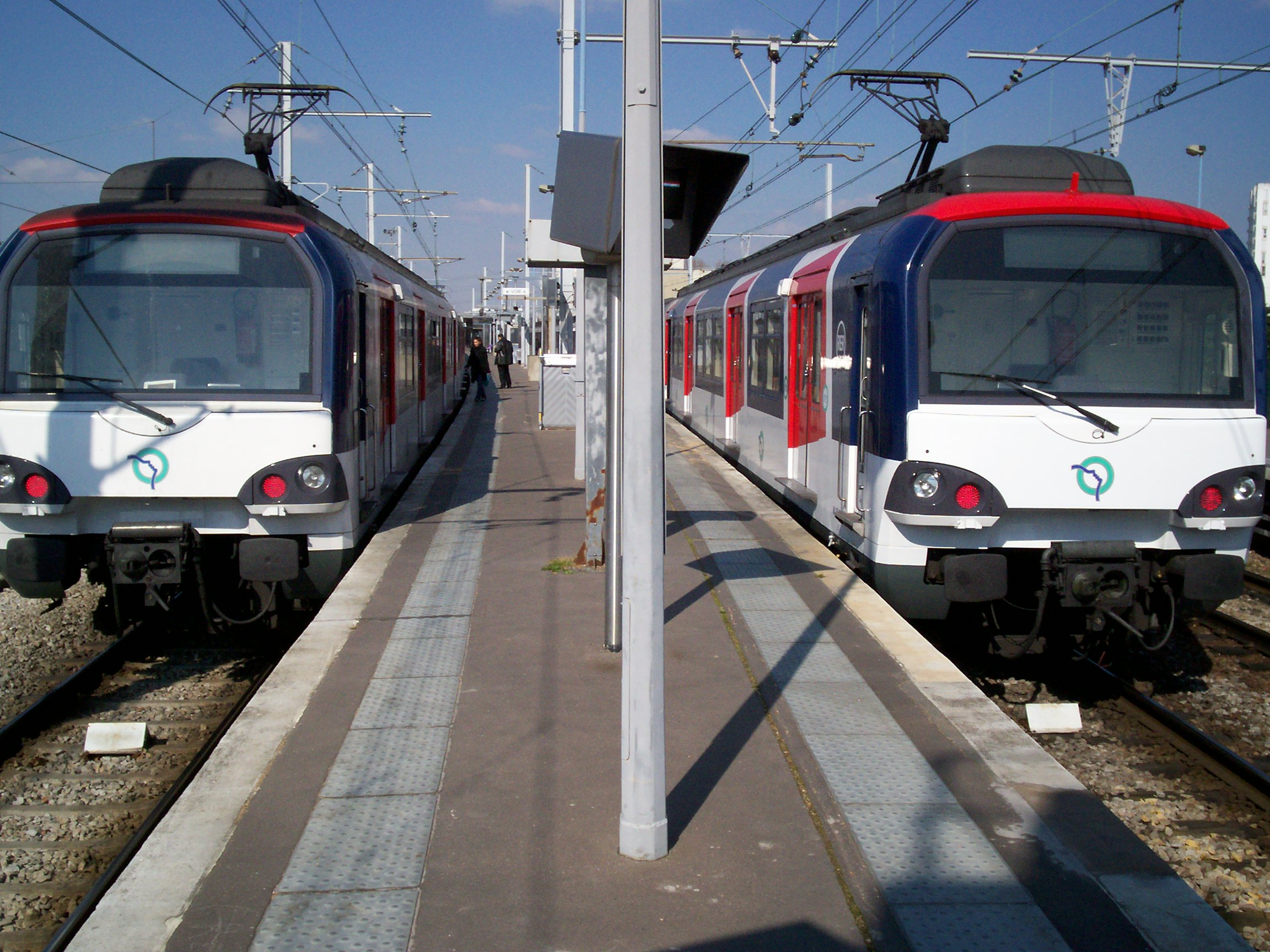
Boissy-Saint-Léger

- A1
  - Saint-Germain-en-Laye
  - Le Vésinet–Le Pecq
  - Le Vésinet–Centre
  - Chatou–Croissy
  - Rueil-Malmaison
  - Nanterre-Ville
  - Nanterre-Université
- A3, A5
  - A3
    - Cergy-le-Haut
    - Cergy-Saint-Christophe
    - Cergy-Préfecture
    - Neuville-Université
    - Conflans-Fin-d'Oise
    - Achères-Ville
  - A5
    - Poissy
    - Achères–Grand-Cormier
  - Maisons-Laffitte
  - Sartrouville
  - Houilles–Carrières-sur-Seine
- Nanterre-Préfecture
- La Défense
- Charles de Gaulle–Étoile
- Auber
- Châtelet–Les Halles
- Gare de Lyon
- Nation
- Vincennes
- A2
  - Fontenay-sous-Bois
  - Nogent-sur-Marne
  - Joinville-le-Pont
  - Saint-Maur–Créteil
  - Le Parc de Saint-Maur
  - Champigny
  - La Varenne–Chennevières
  - Sucy–Bonneuil
  - Boissy-Saint-Léger
- A4
  - Val de Fontenay
  - Neuilly-Plaisance
  - Bry-sur-Marne
  - Noisy-le-Grand–Mont d'Est
  - Noisy–Champs
  - Noisiel
  - Lognes
  - Torcy
  - Bussy-Saint-Georges
  - Val d'Europe
  - Marne-la-Vallée–Chessy

== Operation ==
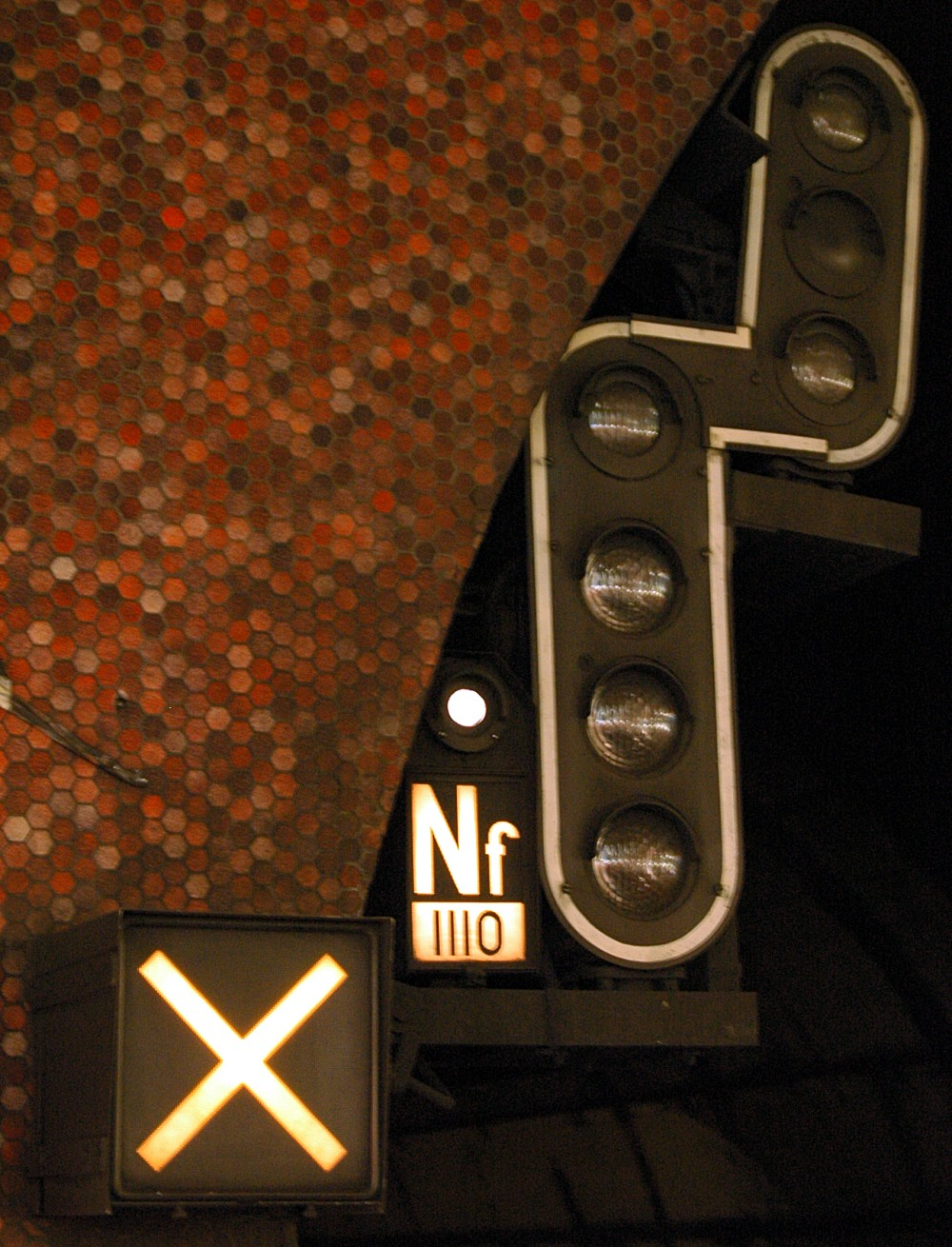
Lineside signal taken over by SACEM (X).

=== Branches ===
Line A provides two groups of services:

- St Germain branch – common trunk line – Marne-la-Vallée branch
- Cergy or Poissy branches – common trunk line – Boissy-saint-léger branch.

During off-peak hours, the Poissy – Noisy services operate every 20 minutes plus a La Défense – Noisy service every 20 minutes, and the St-Germain – Boissy and Cergy – Chessy services operate every 10 minutes.

Operations are very complex during peak periods, with an average of one train every 2 minutes (30 trains / hour) on the common trunk line in the busier direction (east to west in the morning, west to east in the evening), and one train every 2 min 30 sec in the other direction (24 trains / hour). The Marne la Vallée branch has the most intensive service.

=== Names of services ===
RER trains display a mission code rather than the name of the destination station. These are invented names designating (and distinguishing) individual services ("runs"), and are accompanied by a two-digit number, for example ZARA59 or DJIB72.

The first letter corresponds to the destination (gare d'arrivée):

Letter	To	Examples of names of services
B	La Défense	BYLL, BORA, BTON
D	Noisy-le-Grand – Mont d'Est	DYNO, DJIN, DOMI
N	Boissy-St-Léger	NELY, NAGA
O	Torcy	OKEY, ORKA, OFRE
Q	Marne-la-Vallée–Chessy	QUDO, QIKY, QBIK, QAHA
R	La Varenne–Chennevières	RHIN, RUDI
T	Poissy	TERI, TJAC, TIKY
U	Cergy-le-Haut	UPAL, UDON, UXOL
W	(empty train)	WQWZ
X	Le Vésinet–Le Pecq	XUTI, XOUD
Y	Rueil-Malmaison	YCAR, YVAN
Z	Saint-Germain-en-Laye	ZARA, ZEUS, ZINC

The second letter corresponds to the stations served and the origin station: a letter can have different meanings, depending on the destination. For instance, second letter "E" indicates:

- with first letter "N" or "Z", all stations Saint-Germain-en-Laye – Boissy-St-Léger (NELY or ZEUS);
- with first letter "Q", Poissy to Marne-la-Vallée–Chessy, all stations except Neuilly-Plaisance and Bry-sur-Marne (QENO).

The third and fourth letters are used to form a pronounceable name, changed when the service number (odd 01–99 eastward, even 02–98 westward) reaches the maximum. For example, successive trains to Boissy-St-Léger are called NEGE96, NEGE98, then NELY02, NELY04, etc. Each service is uniquely identifiable, as there cannot be two "NEGE" services with the same number in the same day.

Services with the same first two letters serve the same stations, e.g. ZEBU, ZEUS and ZEMA (to Saint-Germain-en-Laye), or NEGE, NELY and NEMO (to Boissy-St-Léger). The letters ZZ generally indicate that the established service pattern was changed for an unspecified reason, generally a technical problem which disrupted operations.

=== Morning Peak ===
Every 10 minutes:

- Boissy – Le Vésinet-Le Pecq, all stations except Nanterre-Ville.
- La Varenne – St-Germain, all stations except Chatou-Croissy and Le Vésinet-Centre.
- Marne-la-Vallée – Chessy – Cergy-le-Haut, all stations except Lognes, Noisiel, Bry-sur-Marne, Houilles and Maisons-Laffitte.
- Marne-la-Vallée – Chessy – Poissy, all stations except Val d'Europe, Bussy-St-Georges, Lognes, Noisy-Champs and Sartrouville.
- Torcy – Rueil-Malmaison, all stations except Bry, Neuilly-Plaisance and Nanterre-Préfecture.
- Cergy – Torcy, all stations except Maisons-Laffitte, Houilles, Noisiel and Lognes.
- Poissy – Chessy, all stations except Neuilly-Plaisance and Bry.
- St-Germain – Boissy, all stations except Le Vésinet-Centre and Chatou-Croissy.
- Le Vésinet-Le Pecq – La Varenne, all stations except Nanterre-Préfecture, Vincennes and Fontenay.

=== Evening Peak ===
Every 10 minutes:

- Cergy – Noisy-le-Grand, all stations except Maisons-Laffitte and Houilles.
- Poissy – Chessy, all stations except Sartrouville, Bry, Noisiel and Lognes.
- St-Germain – Boissy, all stations except Nanterre-Ville and Nanterre-Préfecture.
- Le Vésinet-Le Pecq – La Varenne, all stations except Vésinet-Centre and Chatou-Croissy.
- La Défense – Torcy, all stations except Neuilly-Plaisance and Bry.
- Chessy – Poissy, all stations except Bry and Neuilly-Plaisance.
- Boissy – Le Vésinet-Le Pecq, all stations.
- Noisy – Cergy-le-Haut, all stations except Houilles and Maisons-Laffitte.
- La Varenne – St-Germain, all stations except Fontenay, Vincennes, Nanterre-Préfecture, Chatou-Croissy and Le Vésinet-Centre.

=== Off Peak ===
In both directions every 10 minutes:

- St-Germain-en-Laye – Boissy-St-Léger.
- Cergy-le-Haut – Marne la Vallée-Chessy.

In both directions every 20 minutes:

- Poissy – Noisy-le-Grand – Mont d'Est.
- La Défense – Noisy-le-Grand – Mont d'Est.

Off-peak, a train is scheduled every 3 minutes 20 seconds between La Défense and Vincennes in both directions.

== See also ==
- List of Paris Metro stations
- List of Réseau Express Régional stations
- Paris–Saint-Germain-en-Laye railway
