= Marne-la-Vallée–Chessy station =

Railway station in Disneyland Paris, France

Marne-la-Vallée–Chessy Parcs Disneyland
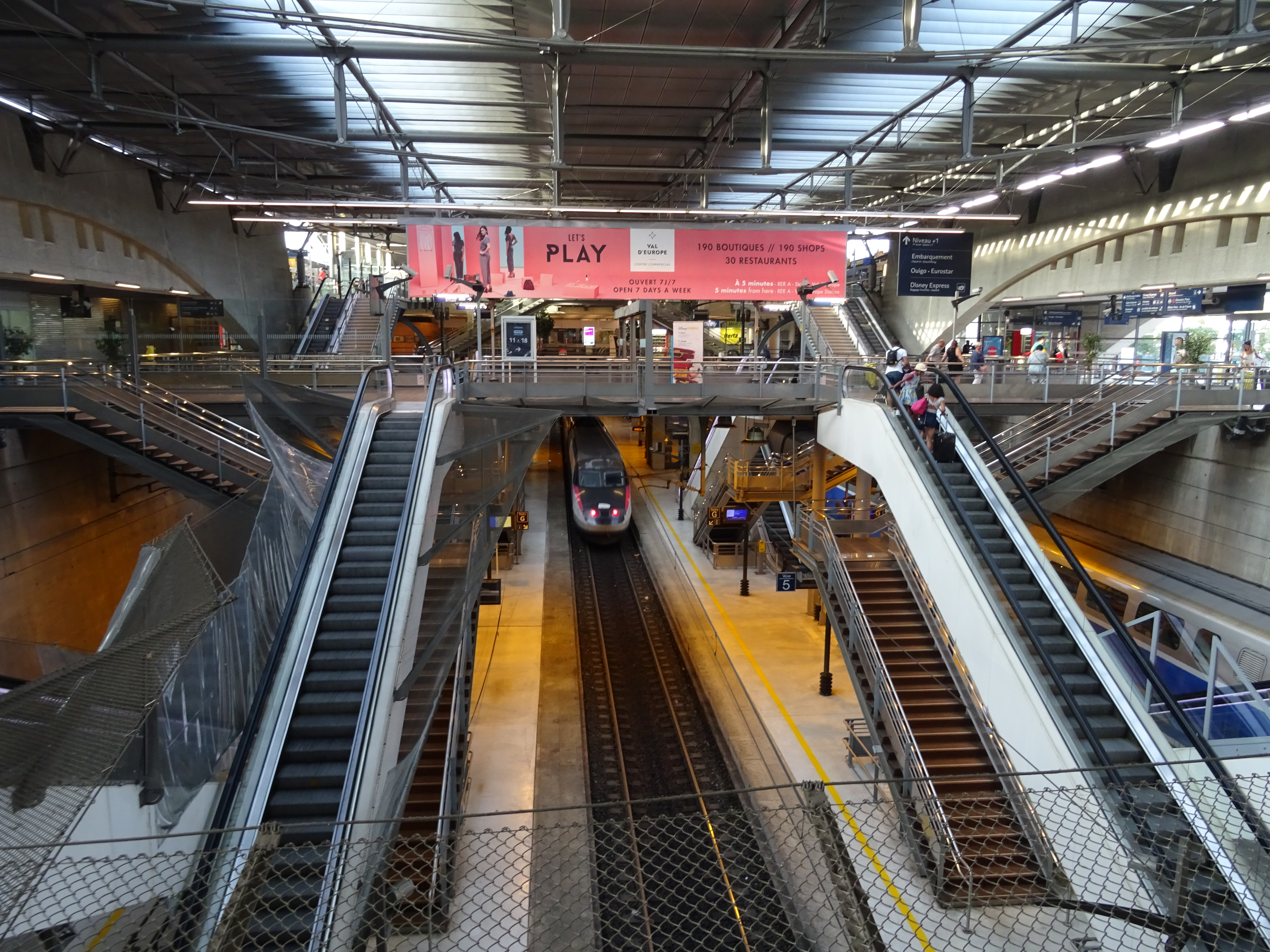
- Marne-la-Vallée – Chessy station high-speed rail platforms as seen from upper level

General information
- Location: Place des Passagers du Vent; Chessy, Seine-et-Marne; France
- Coordinates: 48°52′13″N 2°46′58″E
- Operator: RATP Group & SNCF
- Line: LGV Interconnexion Est
- Platforms: 1 island platform (RER); 3 island platforms (High-speed rail)
- Tracks: 2 (RER); 5 (High-speed rail, 2 bypass station)
- Train operators: Eurostar, RATP Group, SNCF

Construction
- Structure type: Below-grade
- Parking: Yes, paid
- Cycle facilities: Covered parking
- Accessible: Yes, by request to staff

Other information
- Station code: 87111849 (SNCF); 87754994 (RATP); MCK (UK National Rail)
- Fare zone: 5 (RATP)
- Website: gares-sncf.com/fr/gare/frmlv/marne-vallee-chessy

History
- Opened: 1 April 1992; 34 years ago (RER); 29 May 1994; 32 years ago (High-speed rail)

Passengers
- 2024: 4,448,487
Services
Preceding station	SNCF	Following station
Aéroport Charles de Gaulle towards Brussels-South	TGV	Lyon Saint-Exupéry towards Marseille
Aéroport Charles de Gaulle towards Brussels-South	TGV	Lyon Saint-Exupéry towards Perpignan
Aéroport Charles de Gaulle towards Lille-Europe	TGV	Chambéry towards Bourg-Saint-Maurice
Aéroport Charles de Gaulle towards Lille-Europe	TGV	Le Mans towards Bordeaux
Aéroport Charles de Gaulle towards Lille-Europe	TGV	Lyon Saint-Exupéry towards Marseille
Aéroport Charles de Gaulle towards Lille-Europe	TGV	Lyon Saint-Exupéry towards Montpellier
Aéroport Charles de Gaulle towards Lille-Europe	TGV	Lyon Saint-Exupéry towards Nice-Ville
Aéroport Charles de Gaulle towards Lille-Europe	TGV	Lyon Saint-Exupéry towards Toulouse
Aéroport Charles de Gaulle towards Lille-Europe	TGV	Massy TGV towards Nantes
Aéroport Charles de Gaulle towards Lille-Europe	TGV	Massy TGV towards Rennes
Aéroport Charles de Gaulle towards Lille-Flandres	TGV	Massy TGV towards Bordeaux
Aéroport Charles de Gaulle towards Lille-Flandres	TGV	Montbard towards Mulhouse
Champagne-Ardenne TGV towards Strasbourg	TGV	Massy TGV towards Bordeaux
Champagne-Ardenne TGV towards Strasbourg	TGV	Le Mans towards Rennes
Champagne-Ardenne TGV towards Strasbourg	TGV	Tours towards Nantes
Preceding station	Ouigo	Following station
Aéroport Charles de Gaulle towards Tourcoing	Grande Vitesse	Lyon-Part-Dieu towards Montpellier Sud de France
Aéroport Charles de Gaulle towards Tourcoing	Grande Vitesse	Massy TGV towards Bordeaux
Aéroport Charles de Gaulle towards Lille-Flandres	Grande Vitesse	Lyon-Saint-Exupéry TGV towards Marseille
Preceding station	Eurostar	Following station
Valence TGV towards Marseille-Saint-Charles	Eurostar (summer)	Aéroport Charles de Gaulle towards Amsterdam Centraal
Chambéry towards Bourg-Saint-Maurice	Eurostar (winter)	Aéroport Charles de Gaulle towards Amsterdam Centraal
Preceding station	RER	Following station
Val d'Europe towards Cergy-le-Haut or Poissy	RER A	Terminus
Route map
Location

Marne-la-Vallée – Chessy (French pronunciation: [maʁnə la vale ʃɛsi]) also appearing on platform displays as Marne-la-Vallée Chessy – Parcs Disneyland, is a large combined RER (commuter rail), and high-speed rail station in Chessy, Seine-et-Marne, France, about 30 km (19 mi) east of Paris, located on the LGV Interconnexion Est opened in 1994. The station is inside the Disneyland Paris resort, close to the entrances to the theme parks and at the entrance to Disney Village. The station opened as an extension of RER A in April 1992, in conjunction with the opening of the theme park, with The Walt Disney Company contributing €38.1 million of the €126.5 million cost. The high-speed rail part of the station opened in May 1994, two years after the RER portion of station.

== Situation ==
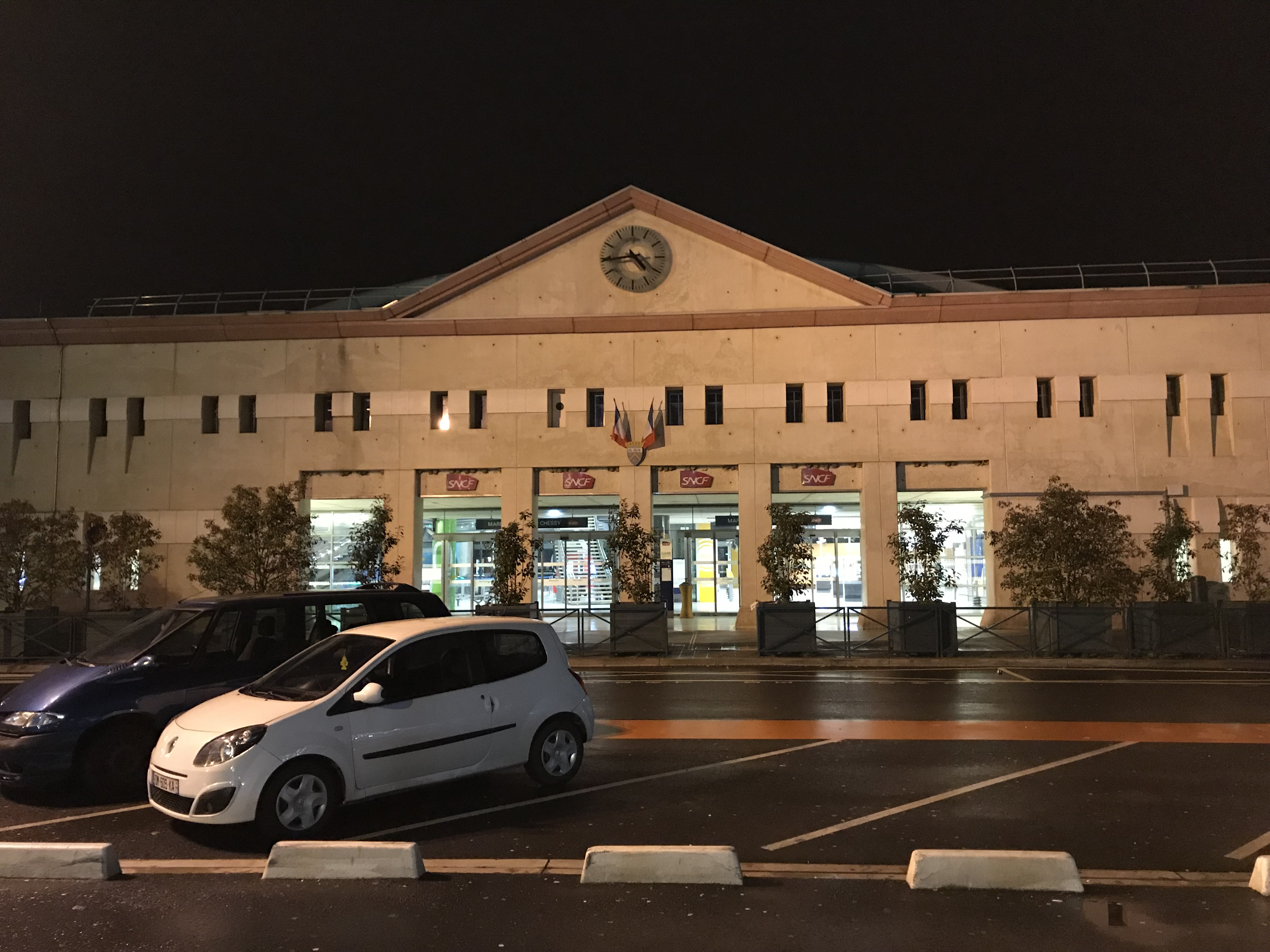
Main entrance

There are direct TGV services to, among others, Bordeaux, Marseille, Nice, Lyon, Rennes, Lille, Nantes, Limoges, Toulouse, Montpellier, Orléans, Grenoble, Brussels, and Frankfurt. On 29 June 1996, Eurostar began direct services from London Waterloo. Marne-la-Vallée–Chessy is also the rail head used for Paris by Ouigo services. Passengers can travel by TGV from Charles de Gaulle Airport TGV station to this station in less than 10 minutes.

The station has a UK National Rail station code of MCK because it is part of the Eurostar network, although Eurostar is not part of National Rail. As Marne-la-Vallée – Chessy is a Eurostar station, it houses Eurostar check-in areas and border control booths operated by the French Border Police and Customs in a dedicated area on the 2nd floor of the station. Passengers went through UK immigration and customs checks at their arrival station in the UK.

Eurostar services from the UK to the station were suspended in June 2023, due to complications over new rules with post-Brexit border controls, and have not started since. However, passengers can book tickets through Eurostar with a connection at Lille-Europe station.

== Train services ==
From Marne-la-Vallée–Chessy, train services depart to major French cities such as Lyon, Marseille, Nice, Montpellier, Perpignan, Lille and Strasbourg. International services operate to Brussels in Belgium, Amsterdam in the Netherlands, London via Lille, and Frankfurt in Germany.

The following services currently start, end, or stop at Marne-la-Vallée–Chessy:

Domestic services:

- High-speed services (TGV) from Lille Europe to Marne-la-Vallée–Chessy, Lyon Saint-Exupéry, Avignon TGV and Marseille-Saint-Charles, Cannes and Nice
- High-speed services (TGV) from Lille Europe to Marne-la-Vallée–Chessy, Lyon Saint-Expuéry, Nîmes, Montpellier-Saint-Roch and Toulouse
- High-speed services (TGV) from Lille Europe to Marne-la-Vallée–Chessy, Tours-Saint-Pierre-des-Corps, Angoulême and Bordeaux-Saint-Jean
- High-speed services (TGV) from Lille Europe to Marne-la-Vallée–Chessy, Le Mans and Rennes
- High-speed services (TGV) from Lille Europe to Marne-la-Vallée–Chessy, Le Mans, Angers and Nantes
- High-speed services (TGV) from Lille Europe to Arras, Marne-la-Vallée–Chessy, Lyon Saint-Exupéry, Nîmes and Montpellier-Saint-Roch
- High-speed services (TGV) from Lille Europe to Arras, Marne-la-Vallée–Chessy, Lyon Saint-Exupéry, Avignon TGV and Marseille-Saint-Charles
- High-speed services (TGV) from Strasbourg to Marne-la-Vallée–Chessy, Le Mans and Rennes
- High-speed services (TGV) from Strasbourg to Marne-la-Vallée–Chessy, Le Mans, Angers and Nantes
- High-speed services (TGV) from Strasbourg to Marne-la-Vallée–Chessy, Tours-Saint-Pierre-des-Corps and Bordeaux-Saint-Jean
- High-speed services (Ouigo) from Marne-la-Vallée–Chessy to Lyon Saint-Exupéry, Avignon TGV and Marseille-Saint-Charles
- High-speed services (Ouigo) from Marne-la-Vallée–Chessy to Lyon Saint-Exupéry, Nîmes and Montpellier-Saint-Roch

International services:

- High-speed services (TGV) from Brussels-South to Lille Europe, Marne-la-Vallée–Chessy, Lyon Saint-Exupéry, Avignon TGV and Marseille-Saint-Charles
- High-speed services (TGV) from Brussels-South to Lille Europe, Marne-la-Vallée–Chessy, Lyon Saint-Exupéry, Nîmes, Montpellier-Saint-Roch and Perpignan
- High-speed services (Eurostar) from Marne-la-Vallée–Chessy to Brussels-South, Antwerpen Centraal, Rotterdam Centraal and Amsterdam Centraal
- High-speed services (Ouigo) from Bordeaux-St-Jean-St to Pierre-des-Corps, Marne la Vallée-Chessy, Champagne-Ardenne, Strasbourg, Mannheim Hbf, Frankfurt (Main) Hbf

Commuter services:

- RER services (A) from Cergy-le-Haut, Conflans-Fin-d'Oise, Sartrouville, La Défense, Gare de Lyon, Vincennes, Val de Fontenay and Marne-la-Vallée–Chessy
- RER services (A) from Poissy to Sartrouville, La Défense, Gare de Lyon, Vincennes, Val de Fontenay and Marne-la-Vallée–Chessy

== See also ==
- List of stations of the Paris RER
- Rail transport in Walt Disney Parks and Resorts
