= Heat burst =

Sudden increase in atmospheric temperature

In meteorology, a heat burst is a rare atmospheric phenomenon characterized by a sudden, localized increase in air temperature near the Earth's surface. Heat bursts typically occur during night-time and are associated with decaying thunderstorms. They are also characterized by extremely dry air and are sometimes associated with very strong, even damaging, winds.

Although the phenomenon is not fully understood, the event is thought to occur when rain evaporates (virga) into a parcel of cold, dry air high in the atmosphere, making the air denser than its surroundings. The parcel descends rapidly, warming due to compression, overshoots its equilibrium level, and reaches the surface, similar to a downburst.

Recorded temperatures during heat bursts have reportedly reached above 140 °F (60 °C), (Note: Unverified) sometimes rising by 18 °F (10 °C) or more within only a few minutes.

== Characteristics ==
In general, heat bursts occur during the late spring and summer seasons. During these times, air-mass thunderstorms tend to generate due to daytime heating and lose their main energy during the evening hours. Due to the potential temperature increase, heat bursts normally occur at night, though they have also been recorded during the daytime. Heat bursts can vary widely in duration, from a couple of minutes to several hours. The phenomenon is usually accompanied by strong gusty winds, extreme temperature changes, and an extreme decrease in humidity. They may occur near the end of a weakening thunderstorm cluster. Dry air and a low-level temperature inversion may also be present during the storm.

== Causes ==
Heat bursts are thought to be caused by a mechanism similar to that of downbursts. As the thunderstorm starts to dissipate, the layer of clouds starts to rise. After the clouds have risen, a rain-cooled layer remains. The cluster shoots a burst of unsaturated air down towards the ground. In doing so, the system loses all of its updraft-related fuel. The raindrops begin to evaporate into dry air, which reinforces the effects of the heat burst (evaporation cools the air, increasing its density). As the unsaturated air descends into lower levels of the atmosphere, the air pressure increases. The descending air parcel warms at the dry adiabatic lapse rate of approximately 10 °C per 1000 meters (5.4 °F per 1000 feet) of descent. The warm air from the cluster replaces the cool air on the ground. The effect is similar to someone blowing down on a puddle of water.

On 4 March 1990, the National Weather Service in Goodland, Kansas, detected a system that had weakened, containing light rain showers and snow showers. It was followed by gusty winds and a temperature increase. The detection proved that heat bursts can occur in both summer months and winter months, and also that a weakening thunderstorm was not necessary for the development of a heat burst.

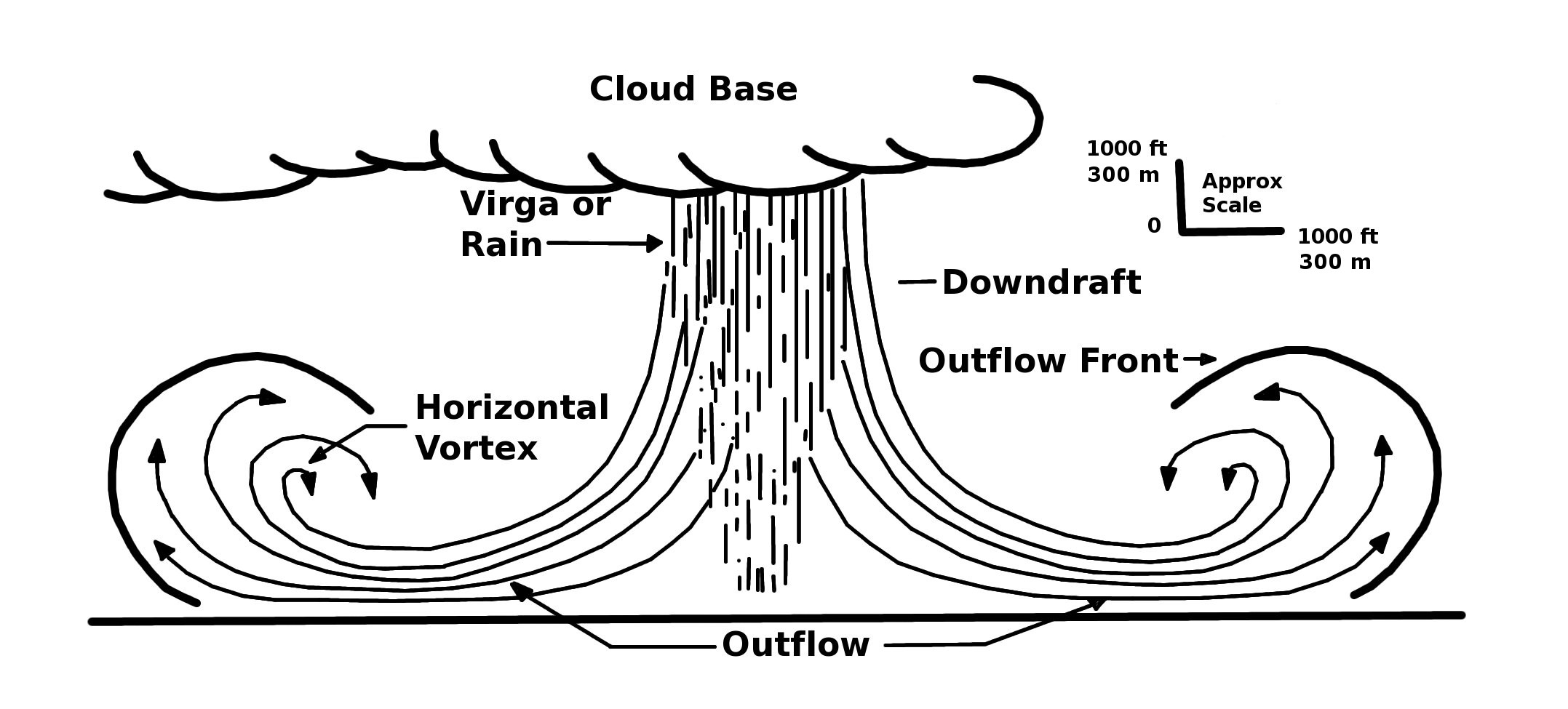

== Forecasting ==
The first step in forecasting and preparing for heat bursts is recognizing the events that precede them. Rain from a high convection cloud falls below cloud level and evaporates, cooling the air. Air parcels that are cooler than the surrounding environment descend in altitude. Lastly, temperature conversion mixed with a downdraft momentum continues downward until the air reaches the ground. The air parcels then become warmer than their environment.

McPherson, Lane, Crawford, and McPherson Jr. researched the heat burst system at the Oklahoma Mesonet, which is owned by both the University of Oklahoma and Oklahoma State University. The purpose of their research was to discover any technological benefits and challenges in detecting heat bursts, to document the time of day and year at which heat bursts are most likely to occur, and to research the topography of where heat bursts are most likely to occur in Oklahoma.

Scientists and meteorologists use archived data to manually study data that detected 390 potential heat burst days during a fifteen-year period. In studying the archived data, they observed that 58% of the potential days had dry line passages, frontal passages, or a temperature change due to an increase in solar radiation in the hours of the morning or a daytime precipitation weather system.

By studying the archived data, scientists have the ability to determine the beginning, peak, and end of heat burst conditions. The peak of heat burst conditions is the maximum observed temperature. The beginning of a heat burst is the time during which the air temperature increases without decreasing until after the peak; the end of a heat burst is when the system ceases to affect the temperature and dew point of the area.

In addition to researching the life cycle and characteristics of heat bursts, a group of scientists concluded that the topography of Oklahoma coincided with the change in atmospheric moisture between northwest and southeast Oklahoma. An increase in convection normally occurs over the High Plains of the United States during the late spring and summer. They also concluded that a higher increase in convection develops if a mid-tropospheric lifting mechanism interacts with an elevated moist layer.

== Documented cases ==
Date	Location	Temperature °F/°C (Initial)	Temperature °F/°C (Final)	Difference °C/°F (Max)	Ref.
25 June 2026	Belle-Île, France	79 °F (26 °C)	93.2 °F (34.0 °C)	8°C/14°F	
9 January 2026	Viewbank, Victoria, Australia	65.3 °F (18.5 °C)	93.2 °F (34.0 °C)	16°C/28°F	
9 September 2023	Schertz, Texas	73 °F (23 °C)	93 °F (34 °C)	11 °C/20 °F	
17 July 2023	Cherokee, Oklahoma	90 °F (32 °C)	103 °F (39 °C)	7 °C/13 °F	
17 June 2022	Georgetown, Texas	82 °F (28 °C)	99 °F (37 °C)	9 °C/17 °F	
11 October 2022	Durban, South Africa	88 °F (31 °C)	100 °F (38 °C)	7 °C/12 °F	
14 June 2022	Tracy, Minnesota	80 °F (27 °C)	93 °F (34 °C)	7 °C/13 °F	
21 May 2022	Beja, Portugal	73.2 °F (22.9 °C)	92.1 °F (33.4 °C)	10.5 °C/18.9 °F	
20 May 2022	Greenville, North Carolina	73 °F (23 °C)	86 °F (30 °C)	7 °C/13 °F	
22 June 2021	Littleton, Colorado	72 °F (22 °C)	88 °F (31 °C)	9 °C/16 °F	
13 June 2021	Friona, Texas	70 °F (21 °C)	88.1 °F (31.2 °C)	10.1 °C/18.1 °F	
18 May 2021	San Antonio, Texas	79 °F (26 °C)	91 °F (33 °C)	7 °C/12 °F	
16 Aug 2020	Solano County, California	78 °F (26 °C)	103 °F (39 °C)	14 °C/25 °F	
4 June 2020	Edmond, Oklahoma	—N/a	97 °F (36 °C)	—N/a	
25 July 2019	Donna Nook, Lincolnshire, England	71.6 °F (22.0 °C)	89.6 °F (32.0 °C)	10 °C/18 °F	
16 July 2017	Chicago, Illinois	72 °F (22 °C)	79 °F (26 °C)	4 °C/7 °F	
16 July 2017	Chicago, Illinois	73 °F (23 °C)	81 °F (27 °C)	4 °C/8 °F	
July 2016 (Note: This event lasted from 11:00 pm CDT, 6 July, to 12:15 am CDT, 7 July)	Hobart, Oklahoma	80.6 °F (27.0 °C)	105.7 °F (40.9 °C)	13.9 °C/25.2 °F	
29 July 2014	Calgary, Alberta	77 °F (25 °C)	84 °F (29 °C)	4 °C/7 °F	
January 2014	Melbourne, Victoria	85.8 °F (29.9 °C)	102 °F (39 °C)	9.1 °C/16.2 °F	
January 2014	Melbourne, Victoria	75.6 °F (24.2 °C)	90.5 °F (32.5 °C)	8.3 °C/14.9 °F	
January 2014	Melbourne, Victoria	79.9 °F (26.6 °C)	92.5 °F (33.6 °C)	7 °C/12.6 °F	
January 2014	Melbourne, Victoria	92.5 °F (33.6 °C)	97.5 °F (36.4 °C)	2.8 °C/5 °F	
11 June 2013	Grand Island, Nebraska	74.2 °F (23.4 °C)	93.7 °F (34.3 °C)	10.9 °C/19.5 °F	
15 May 2013	Dane County, Wisconsin	—N/a	—N/a	10 °F	
14 May 2013	South Dakota	58 °F (14 °C)	79 °F (26 °C)	12 °C/21 °F	
1 July 2012	Georgetown, South Carolina	79 °F (26 °C)	90 °F (32 °C)	6 °C/11 °F	
3 May 2012	Bussey, Iowa	74 °F (23 °C)	85 °F (29 °C)	6 °C/11 °F	
29 April 2012	Torcy, Seine-et-Marne, France	56.1 °F (13.4 °C)	75 °F (24 °C)	10.6 °C/18.9 °F	
23 August 2011	Atlantic, Iowa	88 °F (31 °C)	102 °F (39 °C)	8 °C/14 °F	
3 July 2011	Indianapolis, Indiana	—N/a	—N/a	15 °F	
9 June 2011	Wichita, Kansas	85 °F (29 °C)	102 °F (39 °C)	10 °C/17 °F	
29 October 2009	Buenos Aires, Argentina	87.8 °F (31.0 °C)	94.2 °F (34.6 °C)	3.6 °C/6.4 °F	
26 April 2009	Delmarva Peninsula	68 °F (20 °C)	87 °F (31 °C)	11 °C/19 °F	
18 August 2008	Edmonton, Alberta	72 °F (22 °C)	88 °F (31 °C)	9 °C/16 °F	
3 August 2008	Sioux Falls, South Dakota	70 °F (21 °C)	101 °F (38 °C)	17 °C/31 °F	
26 June 2008	Cozad, Nebraska	—N/a	—N/a	20 °F	
16 June 2008	Midland, Texas	71 °F (22 °C)	97 °F (36 °C)	14 °C/26 °F	
25 May 2008	Emporia, Kansas	71 °F (22 °C)	91 °F (33 °C)	11 °C/20 °F	
16 July 2006	Canby, Minnesota	—N/a	100 °F (38 °C)	—N/a	
20 June 2006	Hastings, Nebraska	75 °F (24 °C)	94 °F (34 °C)	10 °C/19 °F	
12 June 2004	Wichita Falls, Texas	83 °F (28 °C)	94 °F (34 °C)	6 °C/11 °F	
May 1996	Chickasha, Oklahoma	87.6 °F (30.9 °C)	101.9 °F (38.8 °C)	7.9 °C/14.3 °F	
May 1996	Ninnekah, Oklahoma	87.9 °F (31.1 °C)	101.4 °F (38.6 °C)	7.5 °C/13.5 °F	
28 July 1995	Phoenix, Arizona	106.0 °F (41.1 °C)	114.0 °F (45.6 °C)	4.5 °C/8 °F	
2 July 1994	Barcelona, Spain	—N/a	—N/a	23 °F	
August 1993	Barcelona, Spain	—N/a	—N/a	23 °F	
15 June 1960	Kopperl, Texas	—N/a	140°F (60 °C) (Note: Unverified)		

== See also ==
- Topographically induced winds of related nature:
  - Foehn wind
  - Katabatic wind
