= Lycée Jean-Moulin =

Lycée Jean-Moulin may refer to:

- Lycée Jean-Moulin (Angers)
- Lycée Jean-Moulin (Blanc-Mesnil) in Blanc-Mesnil (Seine-Saint-Denis, Île-de-France; académie de Créteil)
- Lycée Jean-Moulin (Draguignan) in Draguignan (Var, Provence-Alpes-Côte d'Azur; académie de Nice)
- Lycée Jean-Moulin (Lyon)
- Lycée Jean-Moulin (Pézenas) in Pézenas (Hérault, Languedoc-Roussillon; académie de Montpellier).
- Lycée Jean Moulin (Torcy, Seine-et-Marne)
- Cité Scolaire Jean Moulin - Albertville
