= A199 =

A199 may refer to:

- A199 road (Great Britain), a road connecting Leith in Edinburgh with West Barns, East Lothian, Scotland
- A199 motorway (France), a road connecting Noisy-le-Grand and Torcy
