= Training (meteorology) =

Repeated areas of rain

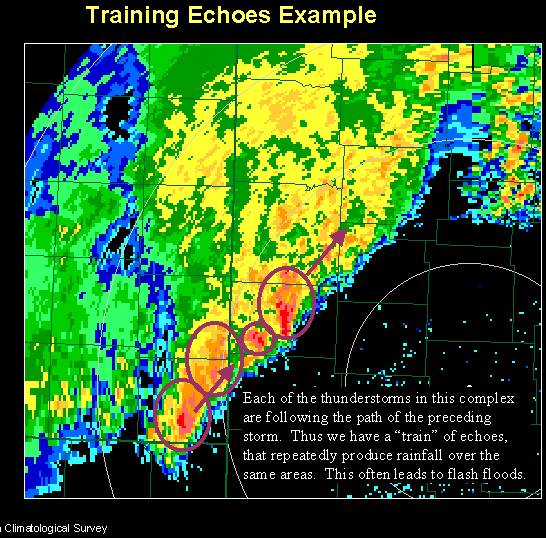
Radar echos depicting training thunderstorms.

In meteorology, training denotes repeated areas of rain, typically associated with thunderstorms, that move over the same region in a relatively short period. Training thunderstorms are capable of producing excessive rainfall totals, often causing flash flooding. The name training is derived from how a train and its cars travel along a track (moving along a single path), without the track moving.

== Formation ==
Showers and thunderstorms along thunderstorm trains usually develop in one area of stationary instability, and are advanced along a single path by prevailing winds. Additional showers and storms can also develop when the gust front from a storm collides with warmer air outside of the storm. The exact process repeats in the new storms until overall conditions in the surrounding atmosphere become too stable to support thunderstorm activity. Showers and storms can also develop along stationary fronts, and winds move them down the front. The showers that often accompany thunderstorms are usually thunderstorms that are not entirely developed.

== Hazards ==
A series of storms continually moving over the same area, dumping heavy rains, can cause flash flooding. Each storm usually produces heavy rain, and after a significant amount of rain falls from the storms which have moved over the same area, flooding occurs.

== Thunderstorm training ==
Thunderstorm training is used to refer specifically to training occurring with thunderstorms. It forms when storms tend to back build. This type of training can quickly cause flash flooding, especially if the thunderstorms are strong.
