= Hôtel de Ville, Torcy =

Town hall in Torcy, France

Hôtel de Ville
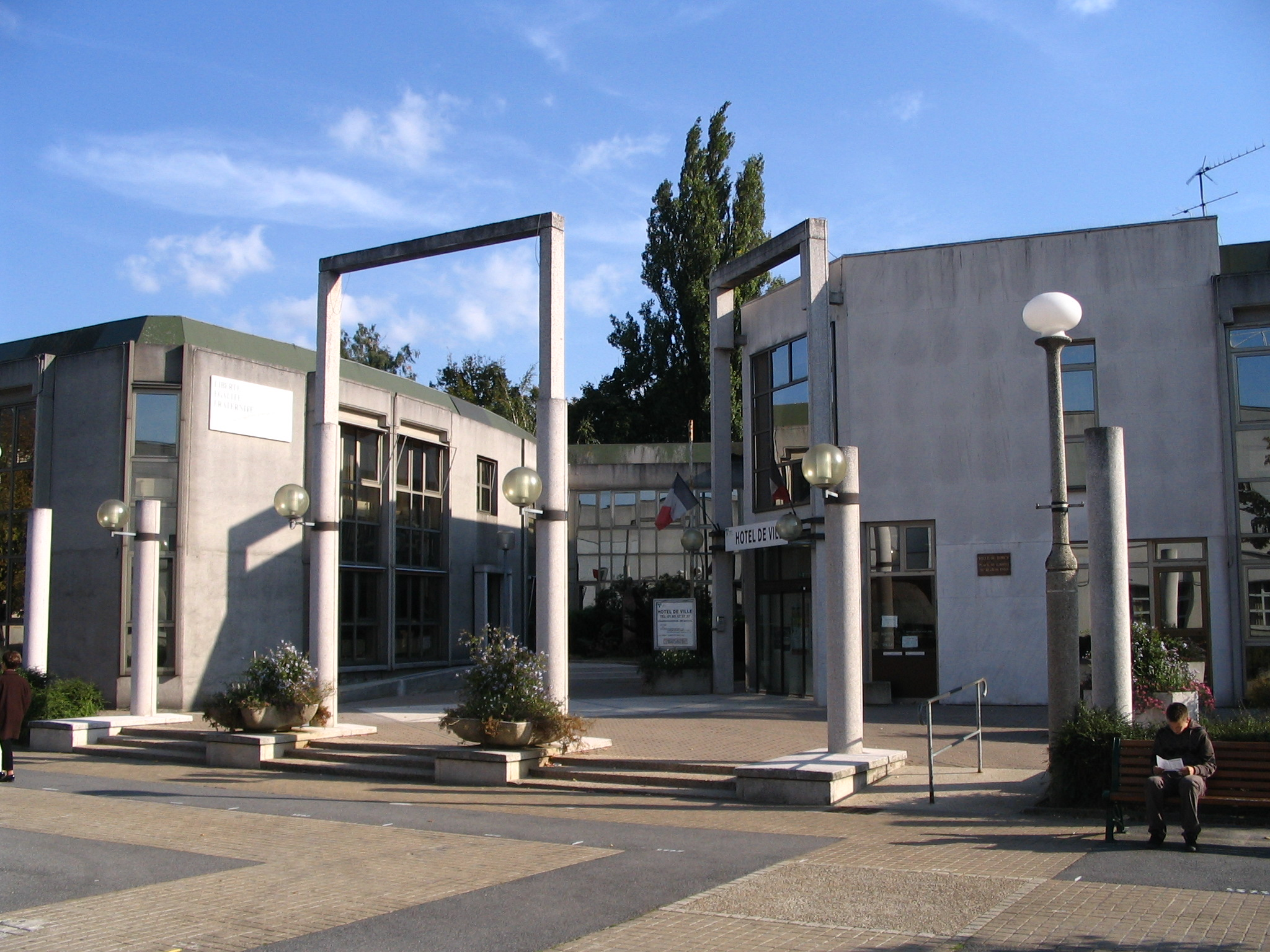
- The main frontage of the Hôtel de Ville in September 2008
- Interactive map of the Hôtel de Ville area

General information
- Type: City hall
- Architectural style: Modern style
- Location: Torcy, France
- Coordinates: 48.8494°N 2.6524°E
- Completed: 1986

The Hôtel de Ville (French pronunciation: [otɛl də vil], City Hall) is a municipal building in Torcy, Seine-et-Marne, in the eastern suburbs of Paris, standing on Place de l'Appel du 18 Juin 1940.

== History ==
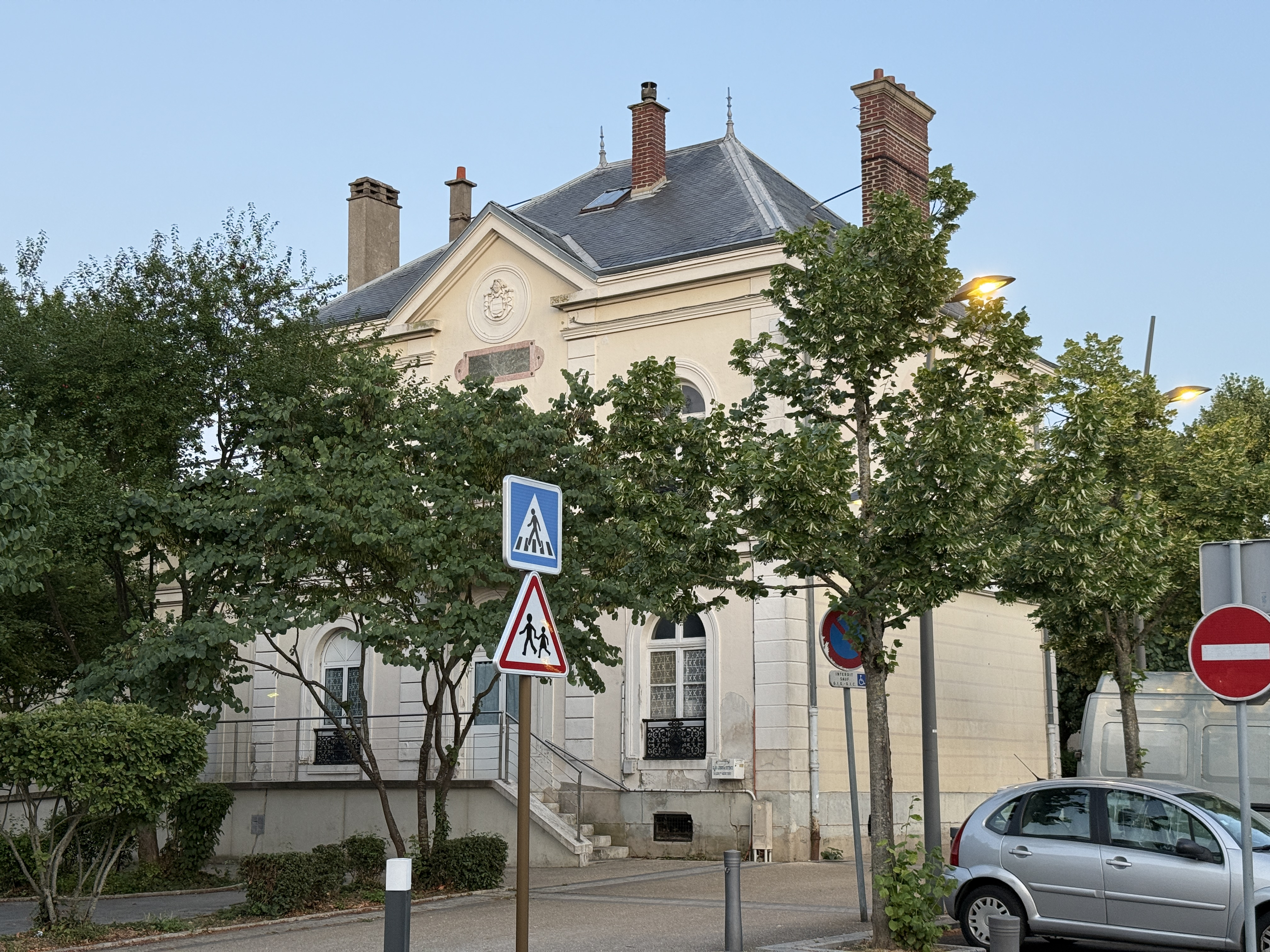
The first town hall

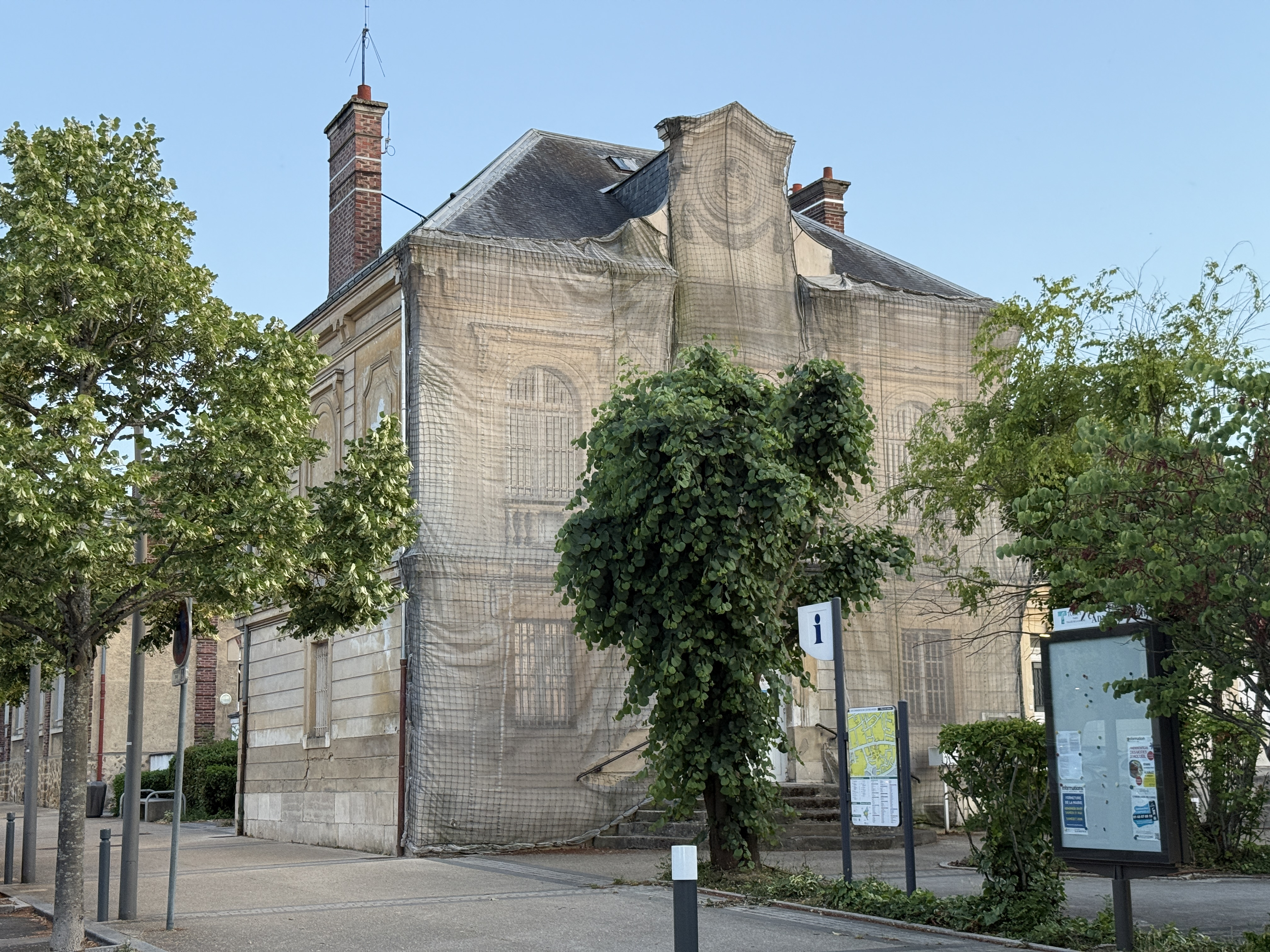
The second town hall

=== The first town hall ===
After the French Revolution, the new town council initially held their meetings in the clergy house on the corner of Grande-Rue (now Rue de Paris) and the east side of Place de l'Église, close to the Church of Saint-Barthélemy. The building had been designed in the neoclassical style, built in ashlar stone and probably dated back to the early 19th century. The design involved a symmetrical main frontage of three bays facing onto Grande-Rue. After the building was no longer required for municipal use, it became a private residence and, in the early 21st century, became the offices of L'Association Ville-Hôpital.

=== The second town hall ===
In the mid-19th century, the council led by the mayor, Édouard Picquemard, decided to commission a purpose-built town hall. The site they selected was on the corner of Grande-Rue (now Rue de Paris), and the west side of Place de l'Église. The new building was designed in the neoclassical style, built in ashlar stone and was completed in 1855. The design again involved a symmetrical main frontage of three bays facing onto Grande-Rue. After the building was no longer required for municipal use, it became a police station.

=== The third town hall ===
In 1966, following significant population growth, the council led by the mayor, Guy Chavanne, decided to acquire a more substantial building. The building they selected was the Maison Blanche further to the west along Rue de Paris. The house was designed in the Châteauesque style, built in brick with a cement render finish and was completed in the early 20th century. The design involved a symmetrical main frontage of five bays facing onto Rue de Paris. It featured a hexagonal projection at the rear which incorporated a parquet floor recovered from the Pavilion of Argentina at the Exposition Universelle in 1889. This room subsequently served as both the Salle du Conseil (council chamber) and the Salle des Mariages (wedding hall) for the town hall. After the building was no longer required for municipal use, it was demolished, except for the hexagonal structure which was retained. The site was subsequently used to accommodate a sheltered accommodation complex, the Résidence Lucien Mayadoux Les Cedres.

=== The fourth town hall ===
In the early 1980s, after further population growth associated with the development of the Résidence du Lac area, the council led by the mayor, Lucien Mayadoux, decided to commission a modern town hall. The site they selected was just to the west of the Church of Saint-Barthélemy, close two the first and second town halls. The building was designed in the modern style, built in concrete and glass and was completed in 1986.

The design involved a main block and two wings which were projected forward creating a small courtyard which was entered through a large concrete frame. At the inner corner of the right-hand wing, there was a canted section with a glass entrance on the ground floor, a casement window on the first floor, and another large concrete frame surrounding it. Internally, the principal room was the Salle du Conseil (council chamber).
