= Thunderstorm =

Storm characterized by lightning

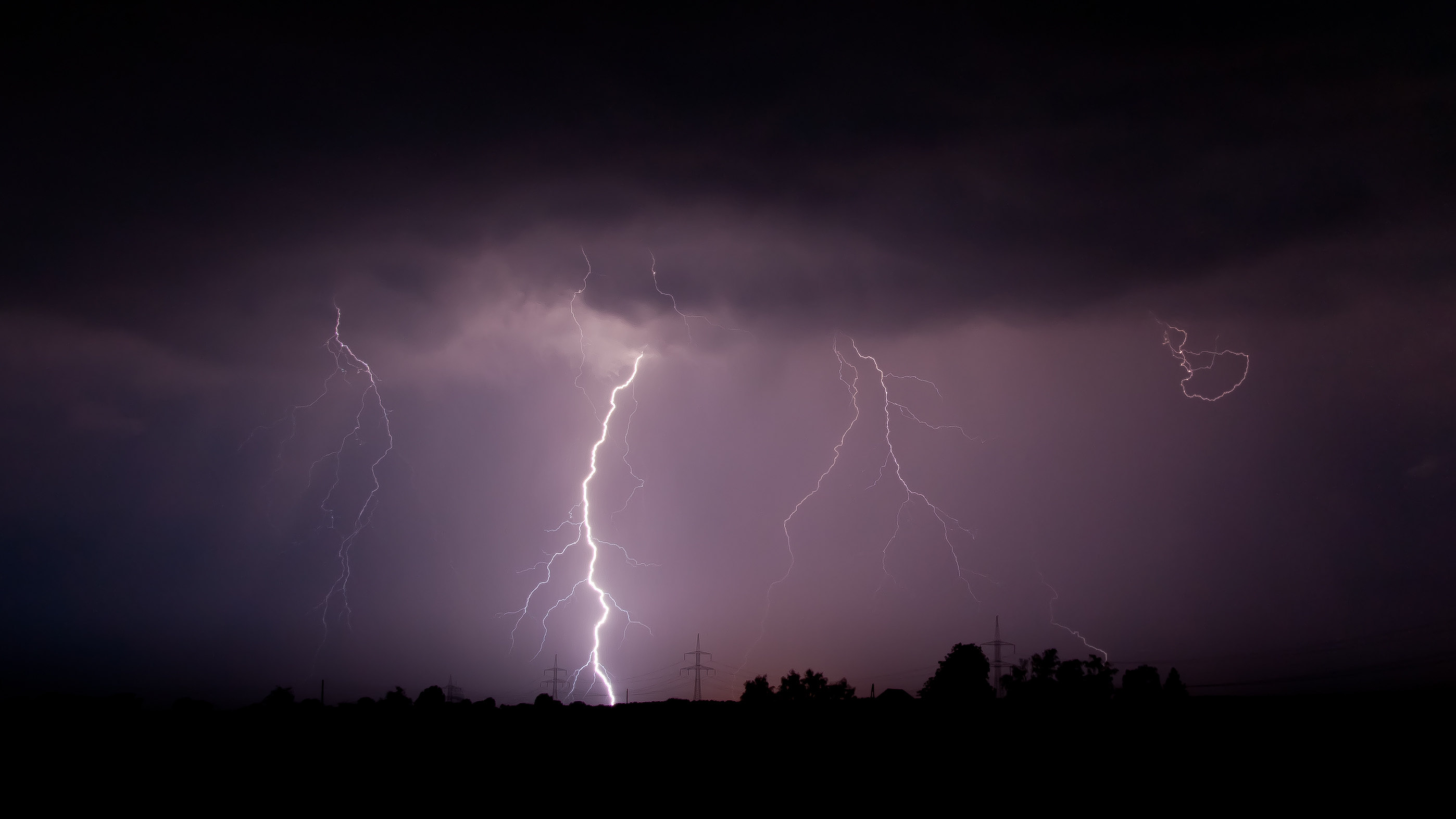
Lightning from a thunderstorm near Pritzerbe, Germany

A thunderstorm, also known as an electrical storm or a lightning storm, is a storm characterized by the presence of lightning and thunder. Relatively weak thunderstorms are sometimes called thundershowers. Thunderstorms occur in cumulonimbus clouds. They are usually accompanied by strong winds and often produce heavy rain and sometimes snow, sleet, or hail, but some thunderstorms can produce little or no precipitation at all. Thunderstorms may line up in a series or become a rainband, known as a squall line. Strong or severe thunderstorms include some of the most dangerous weather phenomena, including large hail, strong winds, and tornadoes. Some of the most persistent severe thunderstorms, known as supercells, rotate as do cyclones. While most thunderstorms move with the mean wind flow through the layer of the troposphere that they occupy, vertical wind shear sometimes causes a deviation in their course at a right angle to the wind shear direction.

Thunderstorms result from the rapid upward movement of warm, moist air, sometimes along a front. However, some kind of cloud forcing, whether it is a front, shortwave trough, or another system is needed for the air to rapidly accelerate upward. As the warm, moist air moves upward, it cools, condenses, and forms a cumulonimbus cloud that can reach heights of over 20 kilometres (12 mi). As the rising air reaches its dew point temperature, water vapor condenses into water droplets or ice, reducing pressure locally within the thunderstorm cell. Any precipitation falls the long distance through the clouds towards the Earth's surface. As the droplets fall, they collide with other droplets and become larger. The falling droplets create a downdraft as it pulls cold air with it, and this cold air spreads out at the Earth's surface, occasionally causing strong winds that are commonly associated with thunderstorms.

Thunderstorms can form and develop in any geographic location but most frequently within the mid-latitude, where warm, moist air from tropical latitudes collides with cooler air from polar latitudes. Thunderstorms are responsible for the development and formation of many severe weather phenomena, which can be potentially hazardous. Damage that results from thunderstorms is mainly inflicted by downburst winds, large hailstones, and flash flooding caused by heavy precipitation. Stronger thunderstorm cells are capable of producing tornadoes and waterspouts.

There are three types of thunderstorms: single-cell, multi-cell, and supercell. Supercell thunderstorms are the strongest and most severe. Mesoscale convective systems formed by favorable vertical wind shear within the tropics and subtropics can be responsible for the development of hurricanes. Dry thunderstorms, with no precipitation, can cause the outbreak of wildfires from the heat generated from the cloud-to-ground lightning that accompanies them. Several means are used to study thunderstorms: weather radar, weather stations, and video photography. Past civilizations held various myths concerning thunderstorms and their development as late as the 18th century. Beyond the Earth's atmosphere, thunderstorms have also been observed on the planets of Jupiter, Saturn, Neptune, and, probably, Venus.

== Life cycle ==
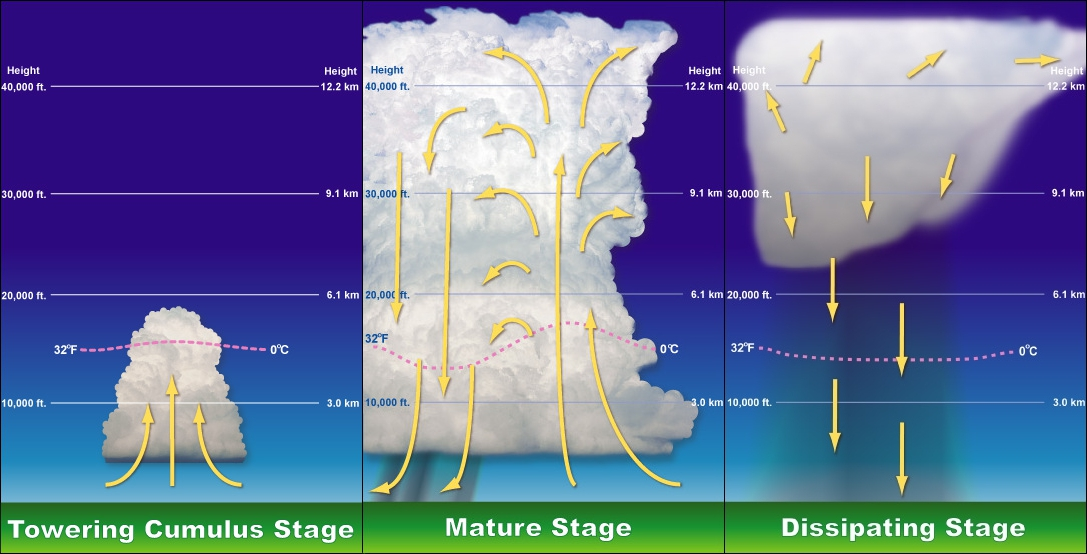
Stages of a thunderstorm's life

Warm air has a lower density than cool air, so warmer air rises upwards and cooler air will settle at the bottom. Clouds form when relatively warmer air, carrying moisture, rises within cooler air. The moist air rises, and, as it does so, it cools and some of the water vapor in that rising air condenses. When the moisture condenses, it releases energy known as latent heat of condensation, which allows the rising packet of air to cool less than the cooler surrounding air continuing the cloud's ascension. If enough instability is present in the atmosphere, this process will continue long enough for cumulonimbus clouds to form and produce lightning and thunder. Meteorological indices such as convective available potential energy (CAPE) and the lifted index can be used to assist in determining potential upward vertical development of clouds. Generally, thunderstorms require moisture, an unstable air mass, and a lifting force in order to form.

All thunderstorms, regardless of type, go through three stages: the developing stage, the mature stage, and the dissipation stage. The average thunderstorm has a 24 km (15 mi) diameter. Depending on the conditions present in the atmosphere, each of these three stages take an average of 30 minutes.

=== Developing stage ===
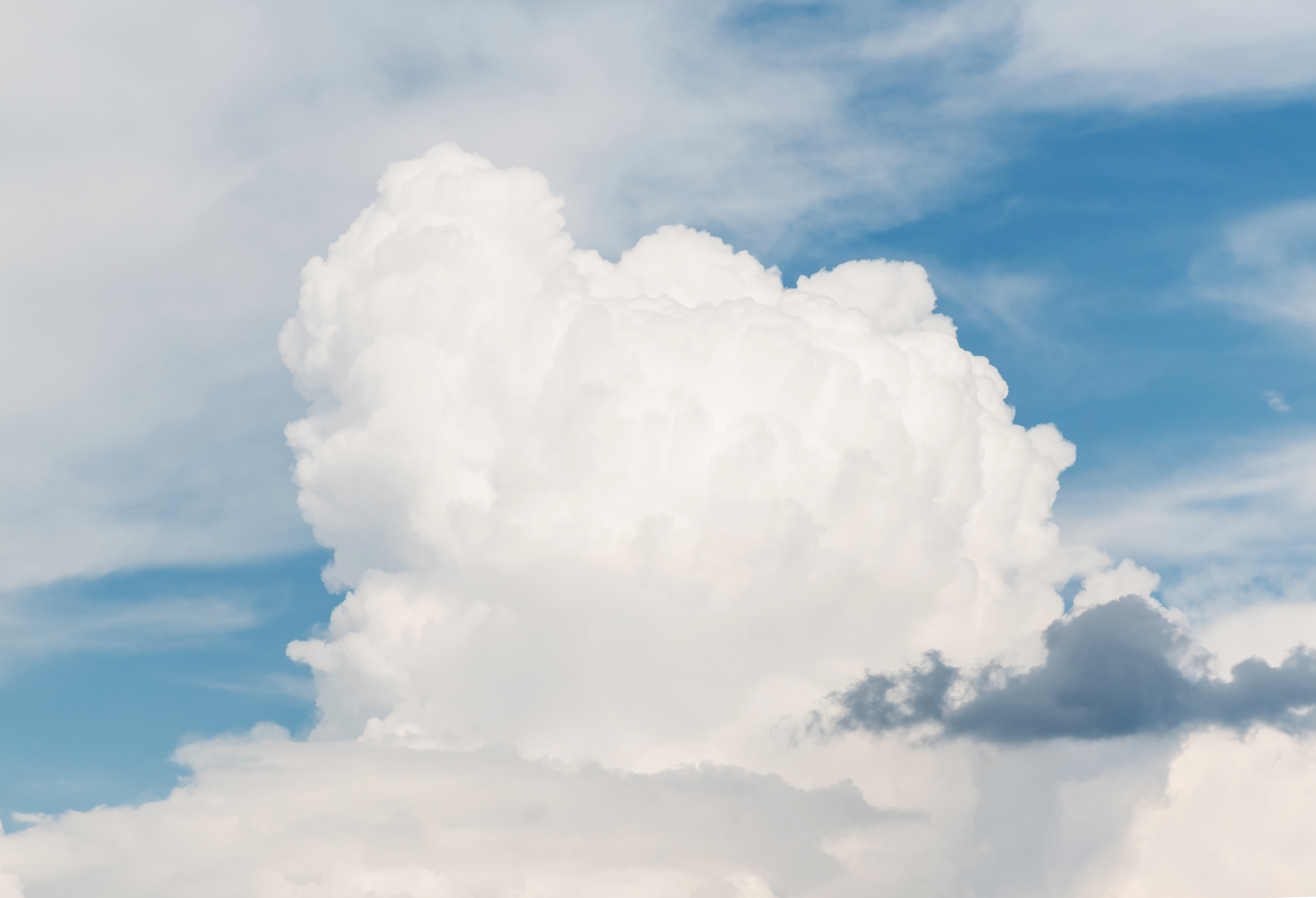
Thunderstorms often develop from cumulus congestus clouds.

The first stage of a thunderstorm is the cumulus stage or developing stage. During this stage, masses of moisture are lifted upwards into the atmosphere. The trigger for this lift can be solar illumination, where the heating of the ground produces thermals, or where two winds converge forcing air upwards, or where winds blow over terrain of increasing elevation. The moisture carried upward cools into liquid drops of water due to lower temperatures at high altitude, which appear as towering cumulus clouds. As the water vapor condenses into liquid, latent heat is released, which warms the air, causing it to become less dense than the surrounding, drier air. The air then continues to rise in an updraft through the process of convection. This process creates a low-pressure zone within and beneath the forming thunderstorm.

=== Mature stage ===
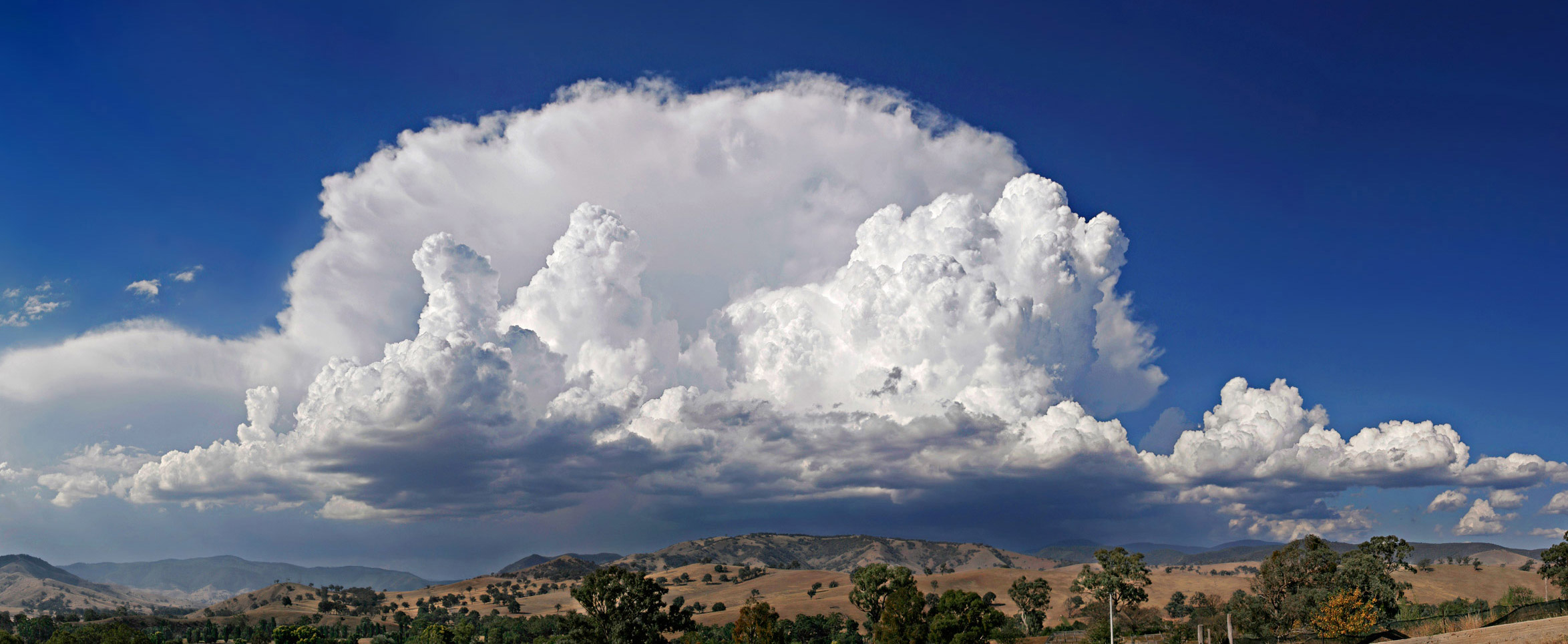
Anvil-shaped thundercloud in the mature stage

In the mature stage of a thunderstorm, the warmed air continues to rise until it reaches an area of warmer air and can rise no farther. Often this 'cap' is the tropopause. The air is instead forced to spread out, giving the storm a characteristic anvil shape. The resulting cloud is called cumulonimbus incus. The water droplets coalesce into larger and heavier droplets and freeze to become ice particles. As these fall, they melt to become rain. If the updraft is strong enough, the droplets are held aloft long enough to become so large that they do not melt completely but fall as hail. While updrafts are still present, the falling rain drags the surrounding air with it, creating downdrafts as well. The simultaneous presence of both an updraft and a downdraft marks the mature stage of the storm and produces cumulonimbus clouds. During this stage, considerable internal turbulence can occur, which manifests as strong winds, severe lightning, and even tornadoes.

Typically, if there is little wind shear, the storm will rapidly enter the dissipating stage and 'rain itself out', but, if there is sufficient change in wind speed or direction, the downdraft will be separated from the updraft, and the storm may become a supercell, where the mature stage can sustain itself for several hours.

=== Dissipating stage ===
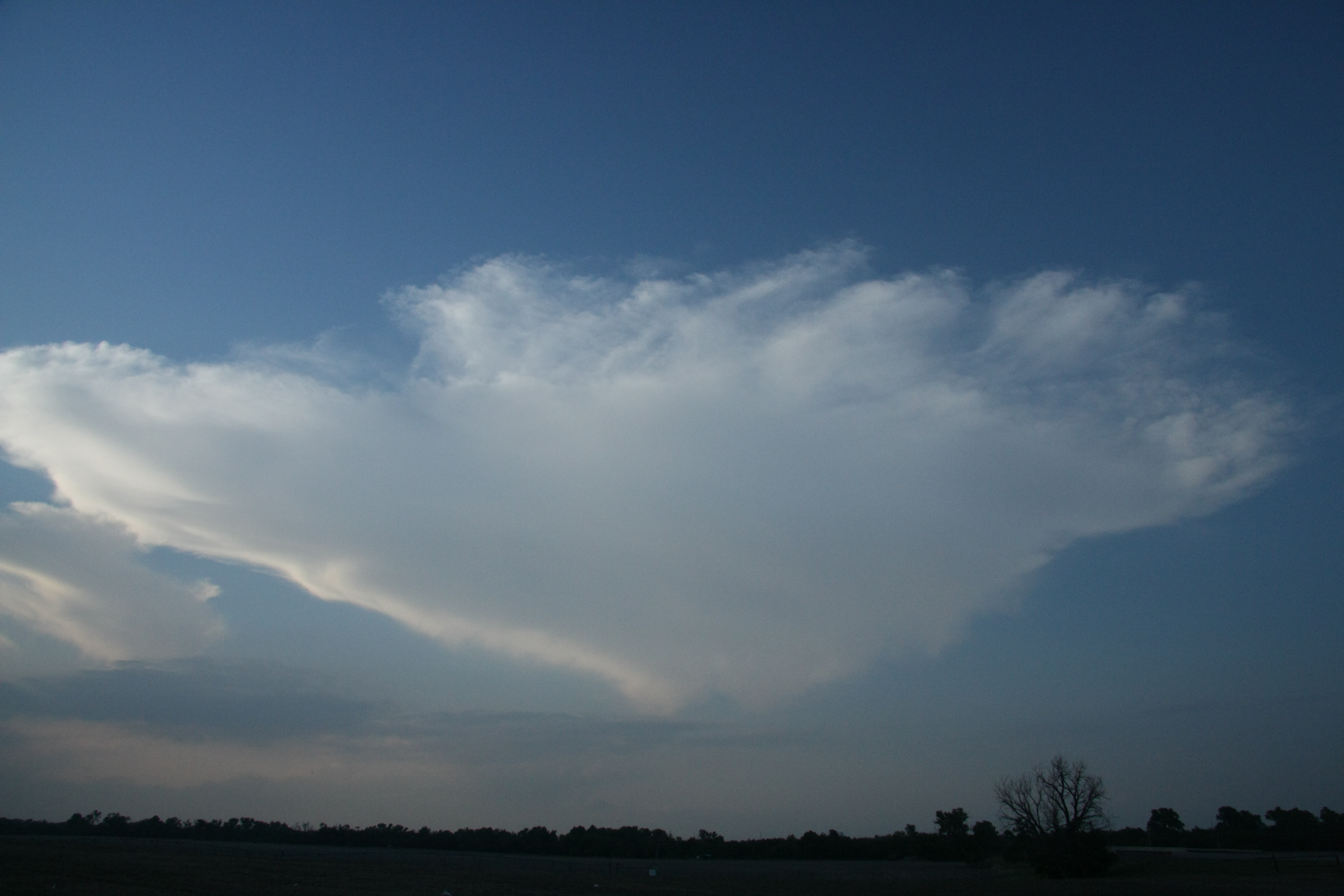
A cirrus spissatus cloud formed from a dissipating thunderstorm

In the dissipation stage, the thunderstorm is dominated by the downdraft. If atmospheric conditions do not support super cellular development, this stage occurs rather quickly, approximately 20–30 minutes into the life of the thunderstorm. The downdraft will push down out of the thunderstorm, hit the ground and spread out. This phenomenon is known as a downburst. The cool air carried to the ground by the downdraft cuts off the inflow of the thunderstorm, the updraft disappears and the thunderstorm will dissipate. Thunderstorms in an atmosphere with virtually no vertical wind shear weaken as soon as they send out an outflow boundary in all directions, which then quickly cuts off its inflow of relatively warm, moist air, and kills the thunderstorm's further growth. The downdraft hitting the ground creates an outflow boundary. This can cause downbursts, a potential hazardous condition for aircraft to fly through, as a substantial change in wind speed and direction occurs, resulting in a decrease of airspeed and the subsequent reduction in lift for the aircraft. The stronger the outflow boundary is, the stronger the resultant vertical wind shear becomes.

== Classification ==
Conditions favorable for thunderstorm types and complexes

There are four main types of thunderstorms: single-cell, multi-cell, squall line (also called multi-cell line) and supercell. Which type forms depends on the instability and relative wind conditions at different layers of the atmosphere ("wind shear"). Single-cell thunderstorms form in environments of low vertical wind shear and last only 20–30 minutes.

Organized thunderstorms and thunderstorm clusters/lines can have longer life cycles as they form in environments of significant vertical wind shear, normally greater than 25 knots (13 m/s) in the lowest 6 kilometres (3.7 mi) of the troposphere, which aids the development of stronger updrafts as well as various forms of severe weather. The supercell is the strongest of the thunderstorms, most commonly associated with large hail, high winds, and tornado formation. Precipitable water values of greater than 31.8 millimetres (1.25 in) favor the development of organized thunderstorm complexes. Those with heavy rainfall normally have precipitable water values greater than 36.9 millimetres (1.45 in). Upstream values of CAPE of greater than 800 J/kg are usually required for the development of organized convection.

=== Single-cell ===
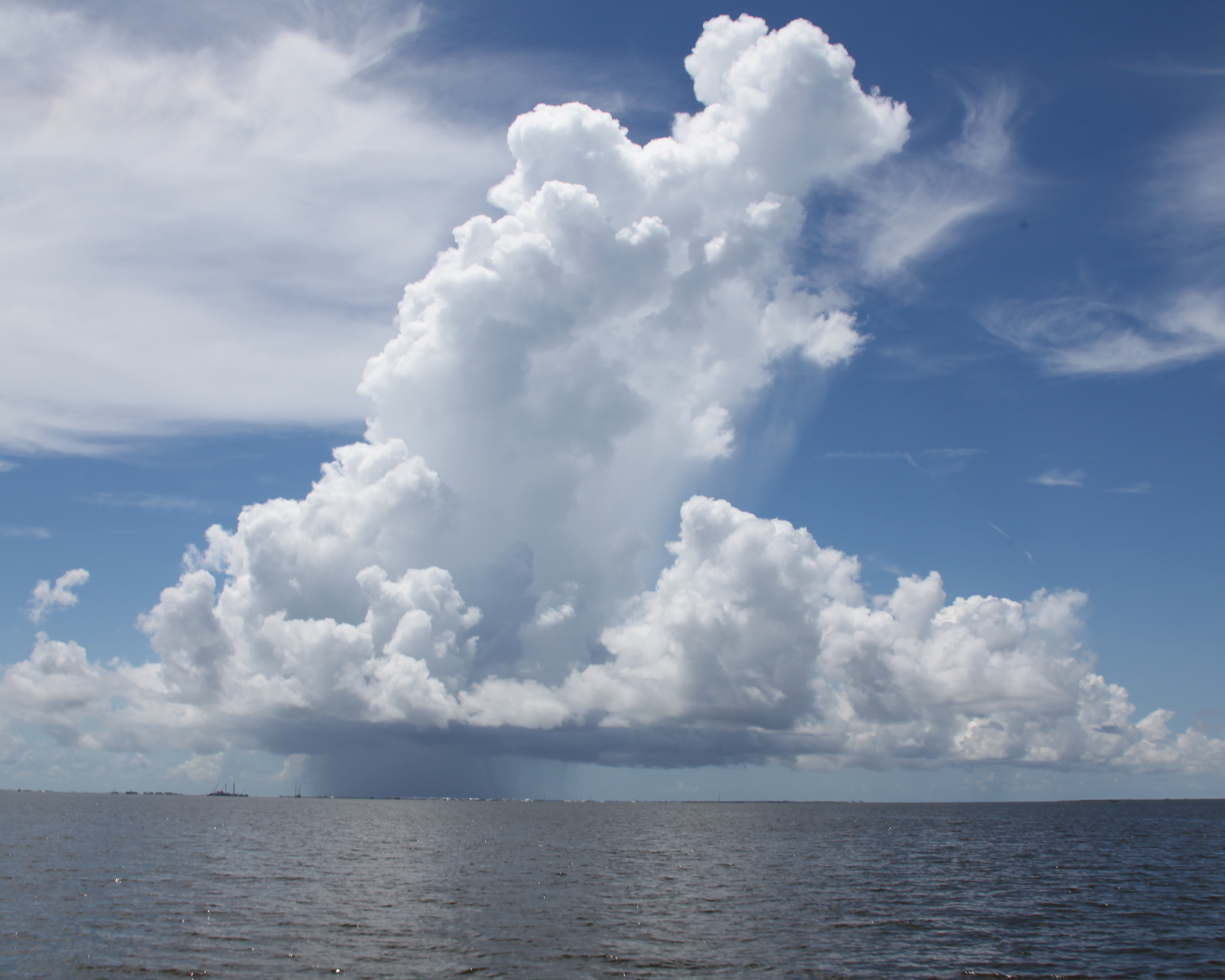
A single-cell thunderstorm over Grand Isle, Louisiana

A single-cell thunderstorm, also known as an air-mass thunderstorm, is a single thunderstorm with one main updraft. Single-cell thunderstorms are the typical summer thunderstorms in many temperate locales. They also occur in the cool unstable air that often follows the passage of a cold front from the sea during winter. Within a cluster of thunderstorms, the term "cell" refers to each separate principal updraft. Thunderstorm cells occasionally form in isolation, as the occurrence of one thunderstorm can develop an outflow boundary that sets up new thunderstorm development. Such storms are rarely severe and are a result of local atmospheric instability; hence the term "air mass thunderstorm". When such storms have a brief period of severe weather associated with them, it is known as a pulse severe storm. Pulse severe storms are poorly organized and occur randomly in time and space, making them difficult to forecast. Single-cell thunderstorms normally last 20–30 minutes.

=== Multi-cell clusters ===
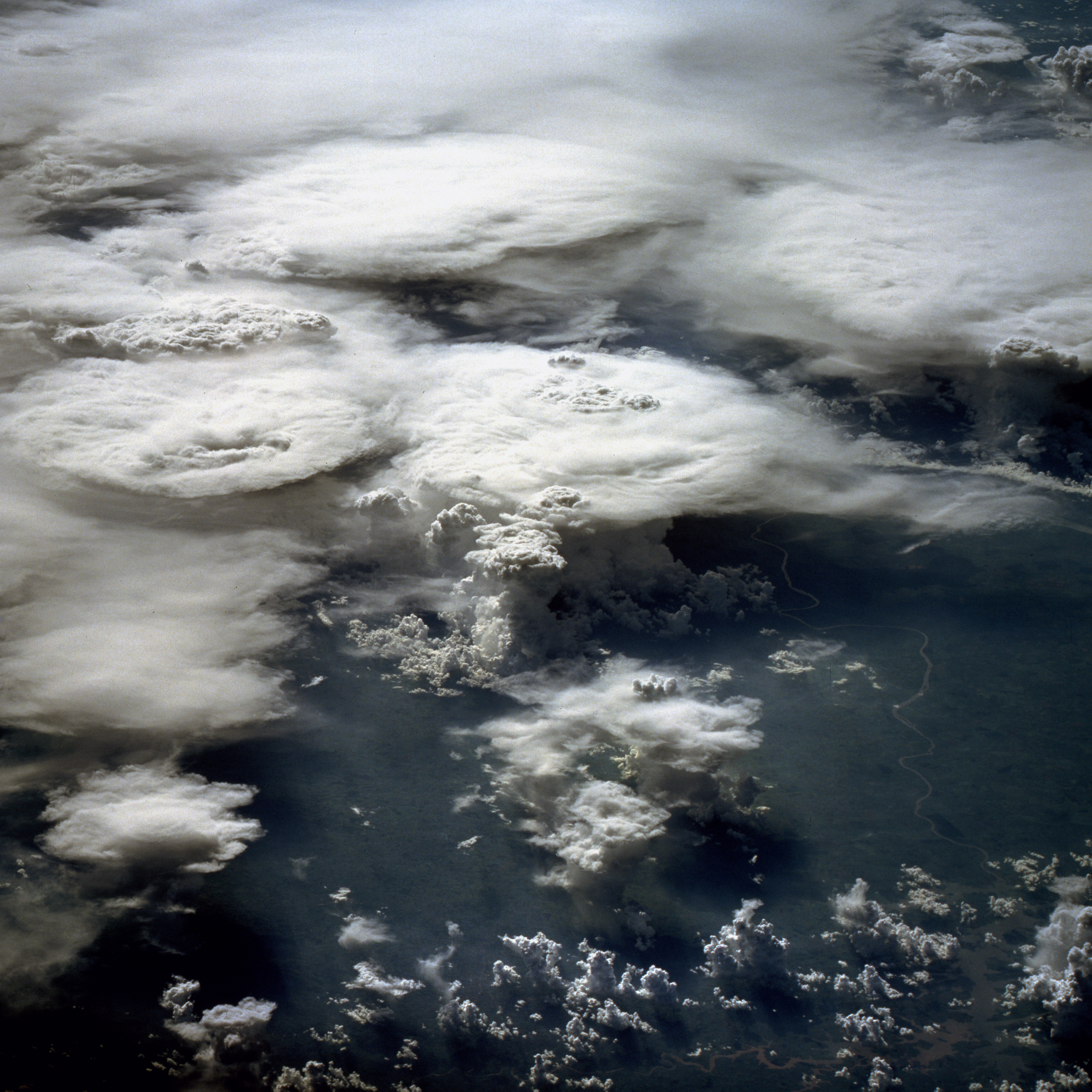
A group of thunderstorms over Brazil photographed by the Space Shuttle Challenger

This is the most common type of thunderstorm development. Mature thunderstorms are found near the center of the cluster, while dissipating thunderstorms exist on their downwind side. Multicell storms form as clusters of storms but may then evolve into one or more squall lines. While each cell of the cluster may only last 20 minutes, the cluster itself may persist for hours at a time. They often arise from convective updrafts in or near mountain ranges and linear weather boundaries, such as strong cold fronts or troughs of low pressure. These types of storms are stronger than the single-cell storm, yet much weaker than the supercell storm. Hazards with the multicell cluster include moderate-sized hail, flash flooding, and weak tornadoes.

=== Squall line ===
A squall line is an elongated line of severe thunderstorms that can form along or ahead of a cold front. In the early 20th century, the term was used as a synonym for cold front. The squall line contains heavy precipitation, hail, frequent lightning, strong straight line winds, and possibly tornadoes and waterspouts. Severe weather in the form of strong straight-line winds can be expected in areas where the squall line itself is in the shape of a bow echo, within the portion of the line that bows out the most. Tornadoes can be found along waves within a line echo wave pattern, or LEWP, where mesoscale low pressure areas are present. Some bow echoes in the summer are called derechos, and move quite fast through large sections of territory. On the back edge of the rain shield associated with mature squall lines, a wake low can form, which is a mesoscale low pressure area that forms behind the mesoscale high pressure system normally present under the rain canopy, which are sometimes associated with a heat burst. This kind of storm is also known as "Wind of the Stony Lake" (simplified Chinese: 石湖风; traditional Chinese: 石湖風; shi2 hu2 feng1) in southern China.

=== Supercells ===
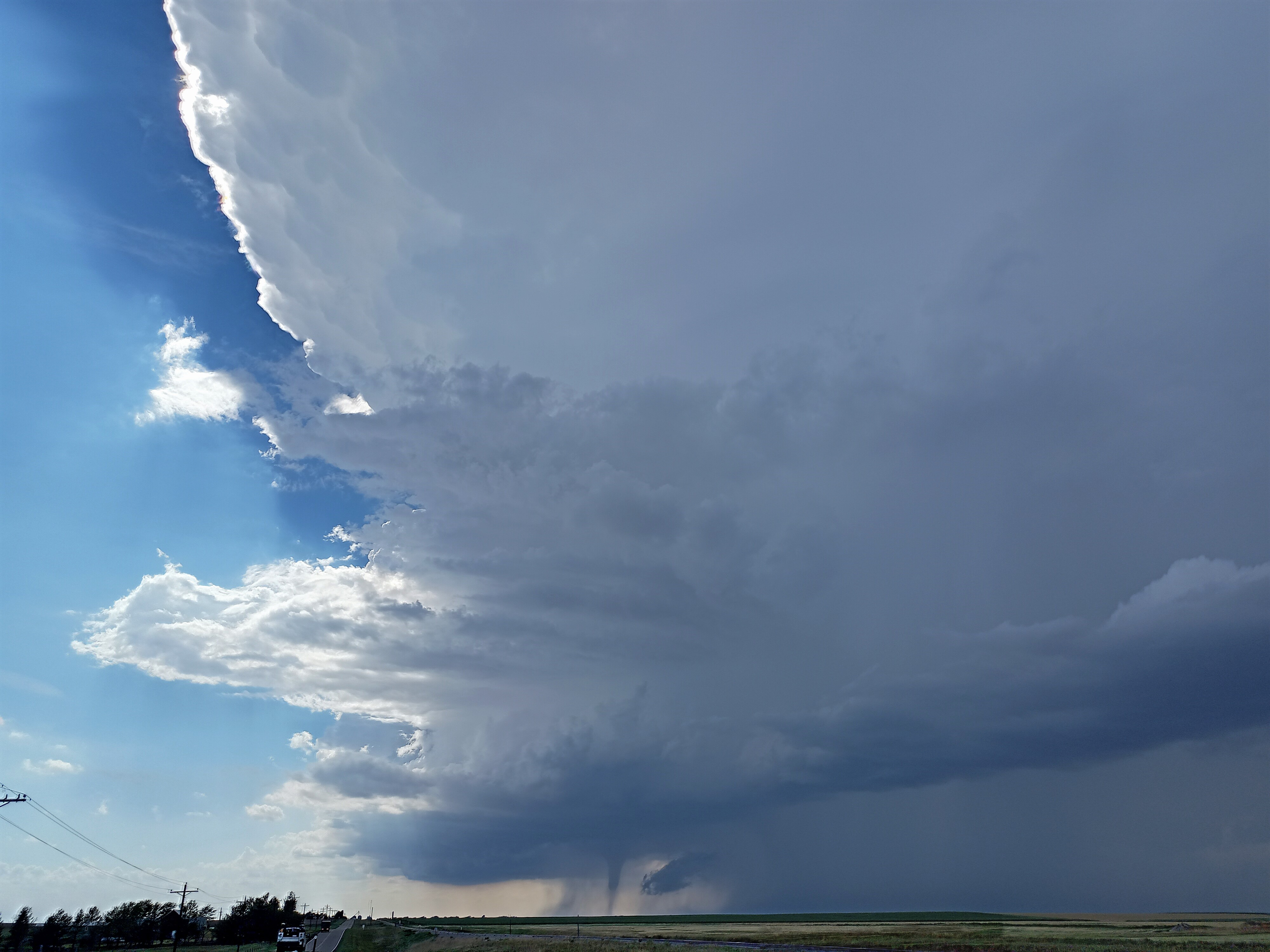
A supercell producing a tornado near Stratton, Colorado.

Supercell storms are large, usually severe, quasi-steady-state storms that form in an environment where wind speed or wind direction varies with height ("wind shear"), and they have separate downdrafts and updrafts (i.e., where its associated precipitation is not falling through the updraft) with a strong, rotating updraft (a "mesocyclone"). These storms normally have such powerful updrafts that the top of the supercell storm cloud (or anvil) can break through the troposphere and reach into the lower levels of the stratosphere. Supercell storms can be 24 kilometres (15 mi) wide. Research has shown that at least 90 percent of supercells cause severe weather. These storms can produce destructive tornadoes, extremely large hailstones (10 centimetres or 4 inches diameter), straight-line winds in excess of 130 km/h (81 mph), and flash floods. In fact, research has shown that most tornadoes occur from this type of thunderstorm. Supercells are generally the strongest type of thunderstorm.

=== Severe thunderstorms ===
In the United States, a thunderstorm is classed as severe if winds reach at least 93 kilometres per hour (58 mph), hail is 25 millimetres (1 in) in diameter or larger, or if funnel clouds or tornadoes are reported. Although a funnel cloud or tornado indicates a severe thunderstorm, a tornado warning is issued in place of a severe thunderstorm warning. A severe thunderstorm warning is issued if a thunderstorm becomes severe, or will soon turn severe. In Canada, a rainfall rate greater than 50 millimetres (2 in) in one hour, or 75 millimetres (3 in) in three hours, is also used to indicate severe thunderstorms. Severe thunderstorms can occur from any type of storm cell. However, multicell, supercell, and squall lines represent the most common forms of thunderstorms that produce severe weather.

=== Mesoscale convective systems ===
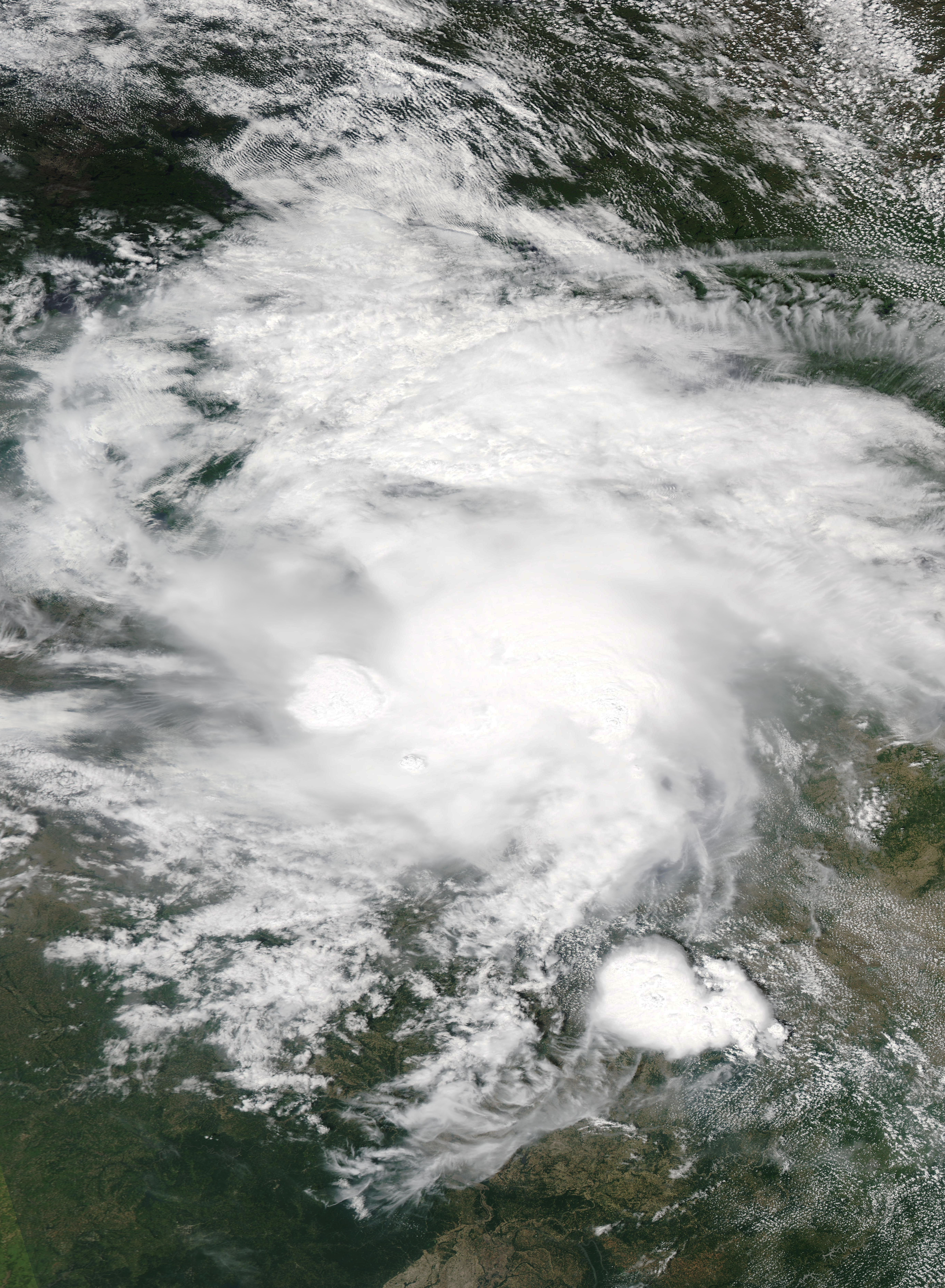
A mesoscale convective complex (MCC) moving through the Great Lakes region

A mesoscale convective system (MCS) is a complex of thunderstorms that becomes organized on a scale larger than the individual thunderstorms but smaller than extratropical cyclones, and normally persists for several hours or more. A mesoscale convective system's overall cloud and precipitation pattern may be round or linear in shape, and include weather systems such as tropical cyclones, squall lines, lake-effect snow events, polar lows, and mesoscale convective complexes (MCCs), and they generally form near weather fronts. Most mesoscale convective systems develop overnight and continue their lifespan through the next day. They tend to form when the surface temperature varies by more than 5 °C (9 °F) between day and night. The type that forms during the warm season over land has been noted across North America, Europe, and Asia, with a maximum in activity noted during the late afternoon and evening hours.

Forms of MCS that develop in the tropics are found in use either the Intertropical Convergence Zone or monsoon troughs, generally within the warm season between spring and fall. More intense systems form over land than over water. One exception is that of lake-effect snow bands, which form due to cold air moving across relatively warm bodies of water, and occurs from fall through spring. Polar lows are a second special class of MCS. They form at high latitudes during the cold season. Once the parent MCS dies, later thunderstorm development can occur in connection with its remnant mesoscale convective vortex (MCV). Mesoscale convective systems are important to the United States rainfall climatology over the Great Plains since they bring the region about half of their annual warm season rainfall.

== Motion ==
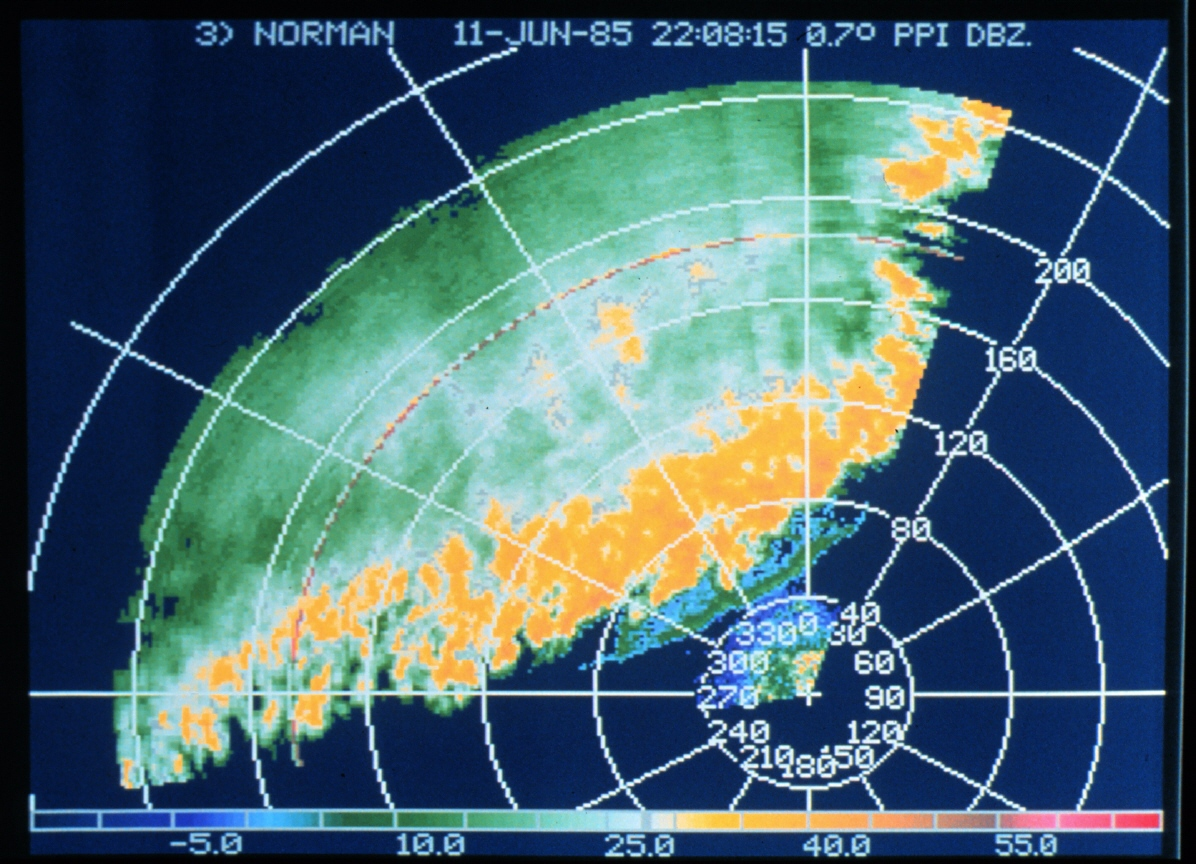
Thunderstorm line viewed in reflectivity (dBZ) on a plan position indicator radar display

The two major ways thunderstorms move are via advection of the wind and propagation along outflow boundaries towards sources of greater heat and moisture. Many thunderstorms move with the mean wind speed through the Earth's troposphere, the lowest 8 kilometres (5.0 mi) of the Earth's atmosphere. Weaker thunderstorms are steered by winds closer to the Earth's surface than stronger thunderstorms, as the weaker thunderstorms are not as tall. Organized, long-lived thunderstorm cells and complexes move at a right angle to the direction of the vertical wind shear vector. If the gust front, or leading edge of the outflow boundary, races ahead of the thunderstorm, its motion will accelerate in tandem. This is more of a factor with thunderstorms with heavy precipitation (HP) than with thunderstorms with low precipitation (LP). When thunderstorms merge, which is most likely when numerous thunderstorms exist in proximity to each other, the motion of the stronger thunderstorm normally dictates the future motion of the merged cell. The stronger the mean wind, the less likely other processes will be involved in storm motion. On weather radar, storms are tracked by using a prominent feature and tracking it from scan to scan.

=== Back-building thunderstorm ===
A back-building thunderstorm, commonly referred to as a training thunderstorm, is a thunderstorm in which new development takes place on the upwind side (usually the west or southwest side in the Northern Hemisphere), such that the storm seems to remain stationary or propagate in a backward direction. Though the storm often appears stationary on radar, or even moving upwind, this is an illusion. The storm is really a multi-cell storm with new, more vigorous cells that form on the upwind side, replacing older cells that continue to drift downwind. When this happens, catastrophic flooding is possible. In Rapid City, South Dakota, in 1972, an unusual alignment of winds at various levels of the atmosphere combined to produce a continuously training set of cells that dropped an enormous quantity of rain upon the same area, resulting in devastating flash flooding. A similar event occurred in Boscastle, England, on 16 August 2004, and over Chennai on 1 December 2015.

== Hazards ==
Each year, many people are killed or seriously injured by severe thunderstorms despite the advance warning. While severe thunderstorms are most common in the spring and summer, they can occur at just about any time of the year.

=== Cloud-to-ground lightning ===
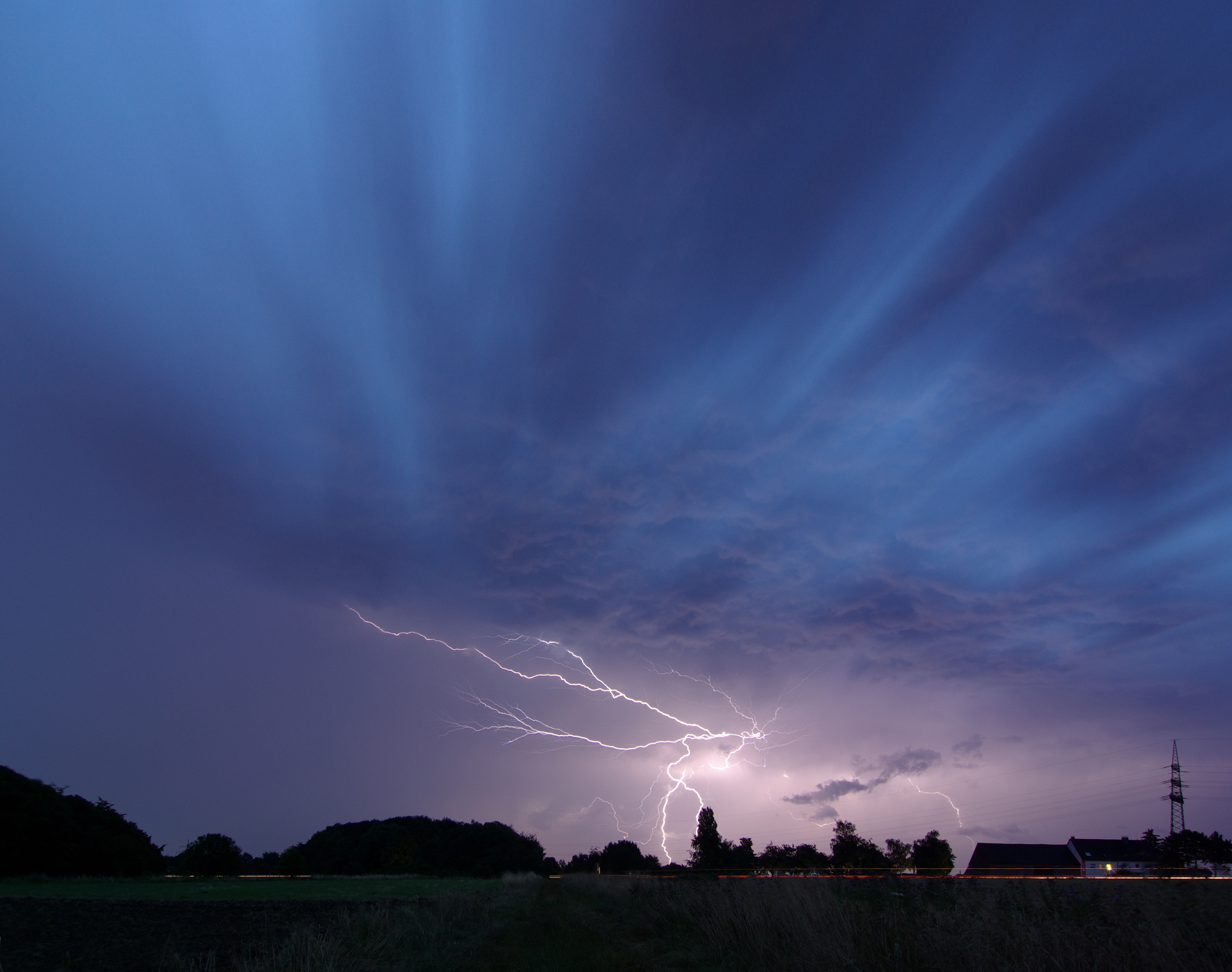
A return stroke, cloud-to-ground lightning strike during a thunderstorm

Cloud-to-ground lightning frequently occurs within the phenomena of thunderstorms and have numerous hazards towards landscapes and populations. One of the more significant hazards lightning can pose is the wildfires they are capable of igniting. Under a regime of low precipitation (LP) thunderstorms, where little precipitation is present, rainfall cannot prevent fires from starting when vegetation is dry as lightning produces a concentrated amount of extreme heat. Direct damage caused by lightning strikes occurs on occasion. In areas with a high frequency for cloud-to-ground lightning, like Florida, lightning causes several fatalities per year, most commonly to people working outside.

=== Acid rain ===
Acid rain is also a frequent risk produced by thunderstorms. Distilled water has a neutral pH of 7. "Clean" or unpolluted rain has a slightly acidic pH of about 5.2, because carbon dioxide and water in the air react together to form carbonic acid, a weak acid (pH 5.6 in distilled water), but unpolluted rain also contains other chemicals. Nitric oxide present during thunderstorm phenomena, caused by the oxidation of atmospheric nitrogen, can result in the production of acid rain, if nitric oxide forms compounds with the water molecules in precipitation, thus creating acid rain. Acid rain can damage infrastructures containing calcite or certain other solid chemical compounds. In ecosystems, acid rain can dissolve plant tissues of vegetations and increase acidification process in bodies of water and in soil, resulting in deaths of marine and terrestrial organisms.

=== Hail ===
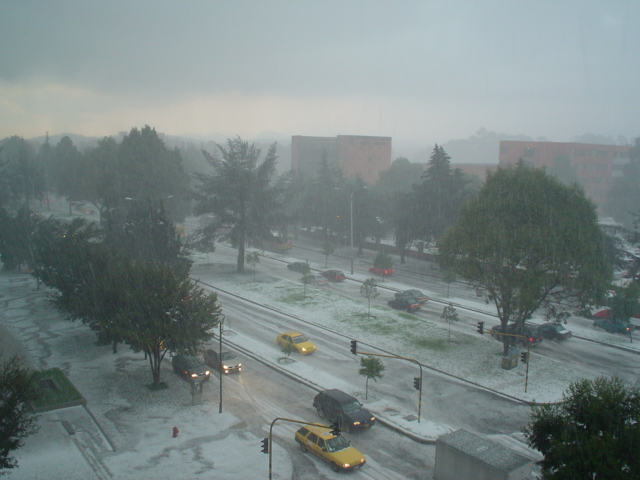
Hailstorm in Bogotá, Colombia

Any thunderstorm that produces hail that reaches the ground is known as a hailstorm. Thunderclouds that are capable of producing hailstones are sometimes seen with green coloration. Hail is more common along mountain ranges because mountains force horizontal winds upwards (known as orographic lifting), thereby intensifying the updrafts within thunderstorms and making hail more likely.

Hail can cause serious damage, notably to automobiles, aircraft, skylights, glass-roofed structures, livestock, and most commonly, farmers' crops. Hail is one of the most significant thunderstorm hazards to aircraft. When hail stones exceed 13 millimetres (0.5 in) in diameter, planes can be seriously damaged within seconds. The hailstones accumulating on the ground can also be hazardous to landing aircraft.

Wheat, corn, soybeans, and tobacco are the most sensitive crops to hail damage. Hail is one of Canada's most costly hazards.

Hailstorms have been the cause of costly and deadly events throughout history. One of the earliest recorded incidents occurred around the 9th century in Roopkund, Uttarakhand, India. The largest hailstone in terms of maximum circumference and length ever recorded in the United States fell in 2003 in Aurora, Nebraska, United States.

One of the more common regions for large hail is across mountainous northern India, which reported one of the highest hail-related death tolls on record in 1888. China also experiences significant hailstorms. Across Europe, Croatia experiences frequent occurrences of hail.

In North America, hail is most common in the area where Colorado, Nebraska, and Wyoming meet, known as "Hail Alley". Hail in this region occurs between the months of March and October during the afternoon and evening hours, with the bulk of the occurrences from May through September. Cheyenne, Wyoming, is North America's most hail-prone city with an average of nine to ten hailstorms per season. In South America, areas prone to hail are cities like Bogotá, Colombia.

=== Tornadoes and waterspouts ===
In June 2007, the town of Elie, Manitoba was struck by an F5 tornado.

A tornado is a violent, rotating column of air in contact with both the surface of the earth and a cumulonimbus cloud (otherwise known as a thundercloud) or, in rare cases, the base of a cumulus cloud. Tornadoes come in many sizes but are typically in the form of a visible condensation funnel, whose narrow end touches the earth and is often encircled by a cloud of debris and dust. Most tornadoes have wind speeds between 40 and 110 mph (64 and 177 km/h), are approximately 75 metres (246 ft) across, and travel several kilometers (a few miles) before dissipating. Some attain wind speeds of more than 300 mph (480 km/h), stretch more than 1,600 metres (1 mi) across, and stay on the ground for more than 100 kilometres (dozens of miles).

The Fujita scale and the Enhanced Fujita Scale rate tornadoes by damage caused. An EF0 tornado, the weakest category, damages trees but does not cause significant damage to structures. An EF5 tornado, the strongest category, rips buildings off their foundations and can deform large skyscrapers. The similar TORRO scale ranges from a T0 for extremely weak tornadoes to T11 for the most powerful known tornadoes. Doppler radar data, photogrammetry, and ground swirl patterns (cycloidal marks) may also be analyzed to determine intensity and award a rating.

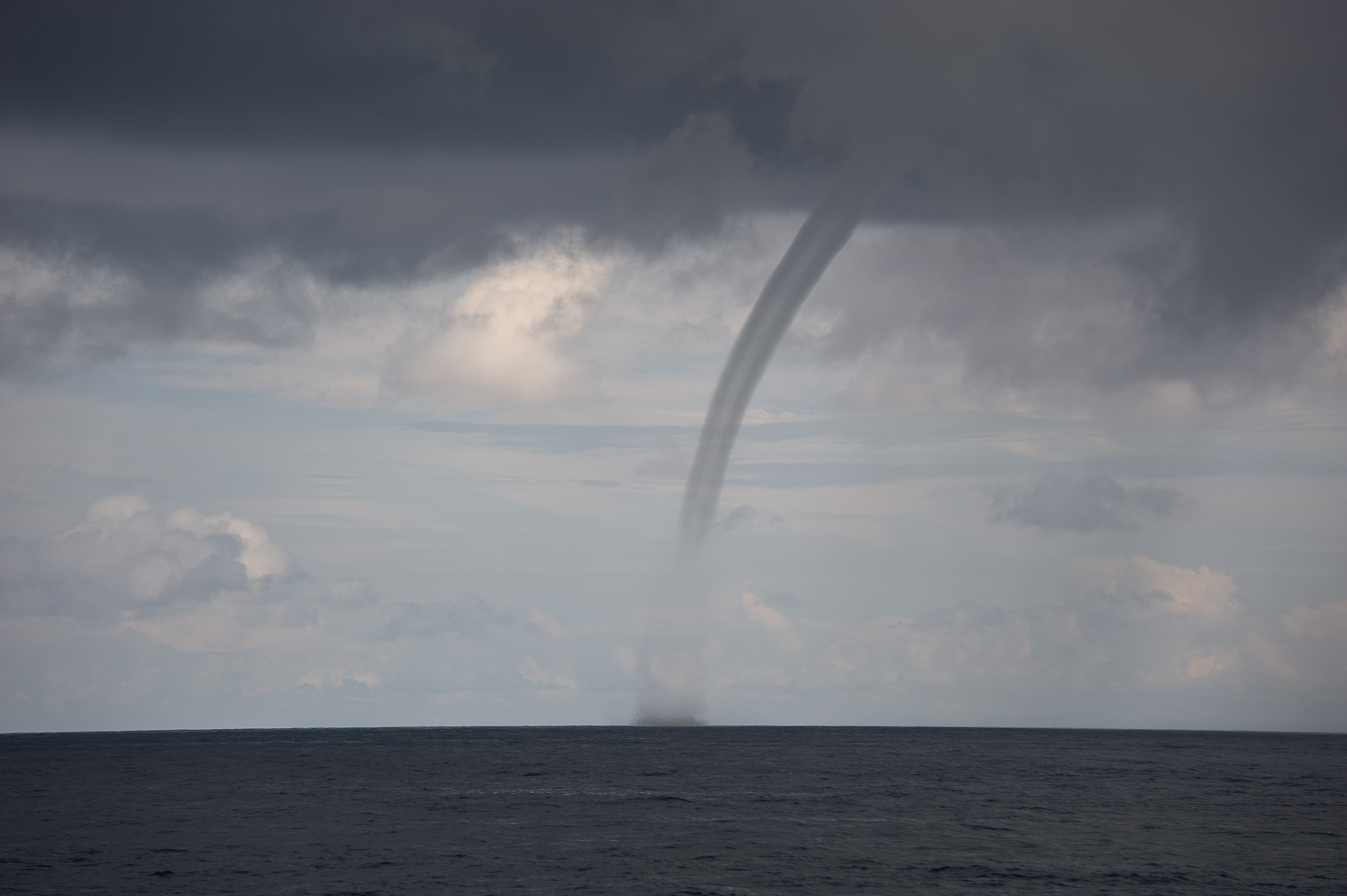
A waterspout near Thailand

Waterspouts have similar characteristics as tornadoes, characterized by a spiraling funnel-shaped wind current that form over bodies of water, connecting to large cumulonimbus clouds. Waterspouts are generally classified as forms of tornadoes, or more specifically, non-supercelled tornadoes that develop over large bodies of water. These spiralling columns of air frequently develop within tropical areas close to the equator, but are less common within areas of high latitude.

=== Flash flood ===
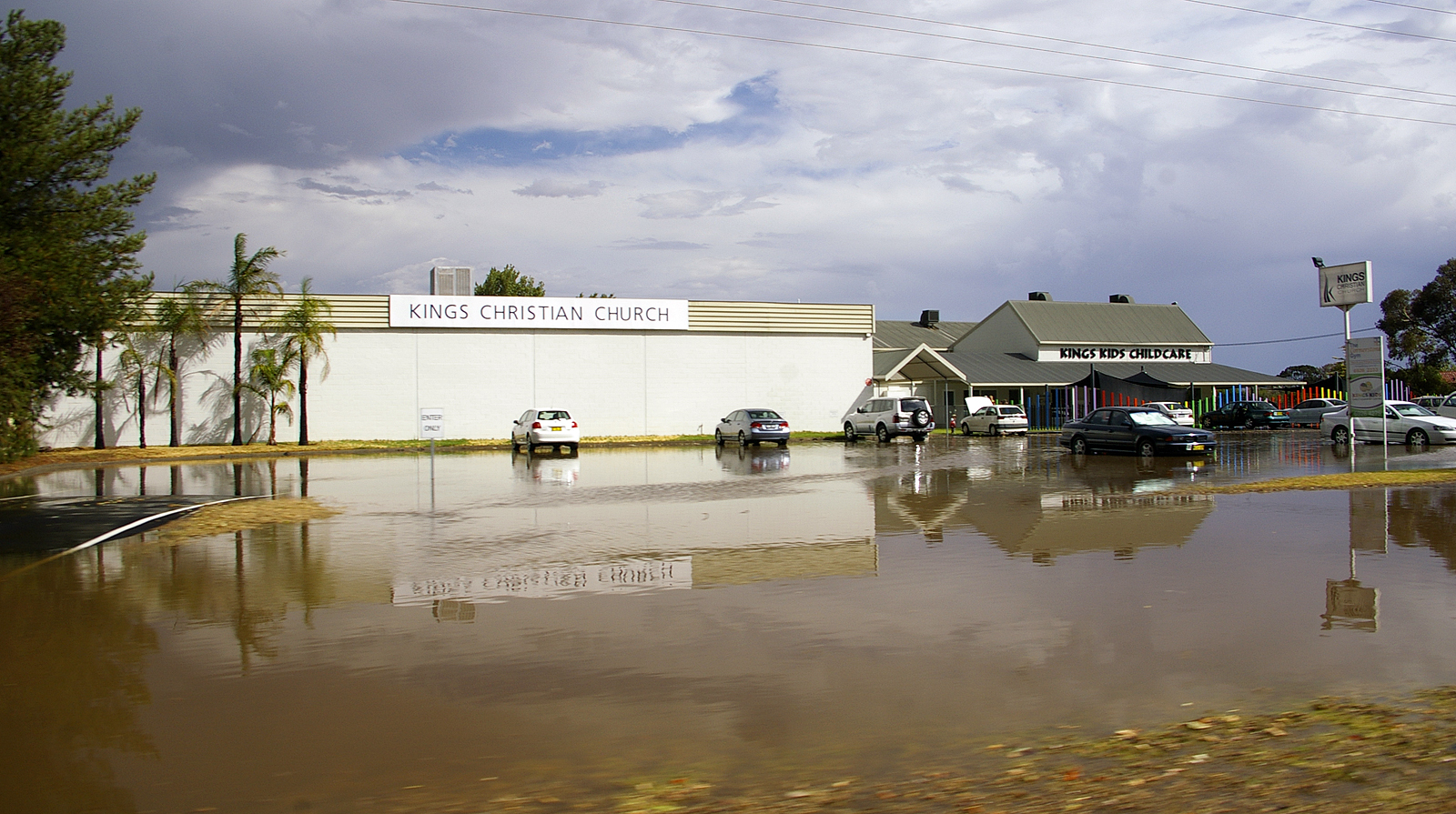
A flash flood caused by a severe thunderstorm

Flash flooding is the process where a landscape, most notably an urban environment, is subjected to rapid floods. These rapid floods occur more quickly and are more localized than seasonal river flooding or areal flooding and are frequently (though not always) associated with intense rainfall. Flash flooding can frequently occur in slow-moving thunderstorms and is usually caused by the heavy liquid precipitation that accompanies it. Flash floods are most common in arid regions as well as densely populated urban environments, where few plants, and bodies of water are present to absorb and contain the extra water. Flash flooding can be hazardous to small infrastructure, such as bridges, and weakly constructed buildings. Plants and crops in agricultural areas can be destroyed and devastated by the force of raging water. Automobiles parked within affected areas can also be displaced. Soil erosion can occur as well, exposing risks of landslide phenomena.

=== Downburst ===
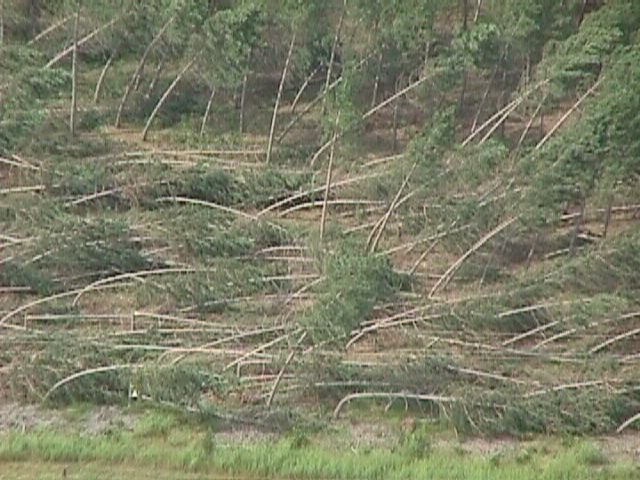
Trees uprooted or displaced by the force of a downburst wind in northwest Monroe County, Wisconsin

Downburst winds can produce numerous hazards to landscapes experiencing thunderstorms. Downburst winds are generally very powerful, and are often mistaken for wind speeds produced by tornadoes, due to the concentrated amount of force exerted by their straight-horizontal characteristic. Downburst winds can be hazardous to unstable, incomplete, or weakly constructed infrastructures and buildings. Agricultural crops, and other plants in nearby environments can be uprooted and damaged. Aircraft engaged in takeoff or landing can crash. Automobiles can be displaced by the force exerted by downburst winds. Downburst winds are usually formed in areas when high pressure air systems of downdrafts begin to sink and displace the air masses below it, due to their higher density. When these downdrafts reach the surface, they spread out and turn into the destructive straight-horizontal winds.

=== Thunderstorm asthma ===
Thunderstorm asthma is the triggering of an asthma attack by environmental conditions directly caused by a local thunderstorm. During a thunderstorm, pollen grains can absorb moisture and then burst into much smaller fragments with these fragments being easily dispersed by wind. While larger pollen grains are usually filtered by hairs in the nose, the smaller pollen fragments are able to pass through and enter the lungs, triggering the asthma attack.

== Safety precautions ==
Most thunderstorms come and go fairly uneventfully; however, any thunderstorm can become severe, and all thunderstorms, by definition, present the danger of lightning. Thunderstorm preparedness and safety refers to taking steps before, during, and after a thunderstorm to minimize injury and damage.

=== Preparedness ===
Preparedness refers to precautions that should be taken before a thunderstorm. Some preparedness takes the form of general readiness (as a thunderstorm can occur at any time of the day or year). Preparing a family emergency plan, for example, can save valuable time if a storm arises quickly and unexpectedly. Preparing the home by removing dead or rotting limbs and trees, which can be blown over in high winds, can also significantly reduce the risk of property damage and personal injury.

The National Weather Service (NWS) in the United States recommends several precautions that people should take if thunderstorms are likely to occur:

- Know the names of local counties, cities, and towns, as these are how warnings are described.
- Monitor forecasts and weather conditions and know whether thunderstorms are likely in the area.
- Be alert for natural signs of an approaching storm.
- Cancel or reschedule outdoor events (to avoid being caught outdoors when a storm hits).
- Take action early so you have time to get to a safe place.
- Get inside a substantial building or hard-topped metal vehicle before threatening weather arrives.
- If you hear thunder, get to the safe place immediately.
- Avoid open areas like hilltops, fields, and beaches, and do not be or be near the tallest objects in an area when thunderstorms are occurring.
- Do not shelter under tall or isolated trees during thunderstorms.
- If in the woods, put as much distance as possible between you and any trees during thunderstorms.
- If in a group, spread out to increase the chances of survivors who could come to the aid of any victims from a lightning strike.

=== Safety ===
While safety and preparedness often overlap, "thunderstorm safety" generally refers to what people should do during and after a storm. The American Red Cross recommends that people follow these precautions if a storm is imminent or in progress:

- Take action immediately upon hearing thunder. Anyone close enough to the storm to hear thunder can be struck by lightning.
- Avoid electrical appliances, including corded telephones. Cordless and wireless telephones are safe to use during a thunderstorm.
- Close and stay away from windows and doors, as glass can become a serious hazard in high wind.
- Do not bathe or shower, as plumbing conducts electricity.
- If driving, safely exit the roadway, turn on hazard lights, and park. Remain in the vehicle and avoid touching metal.

The NWS stopped recommending the "lightning crouch" in 2008 as it does not provide a significant level of protection and will not significantly lower the risk of being killed or injured from a nearby lightning strike.

== Frequent occurrences ==
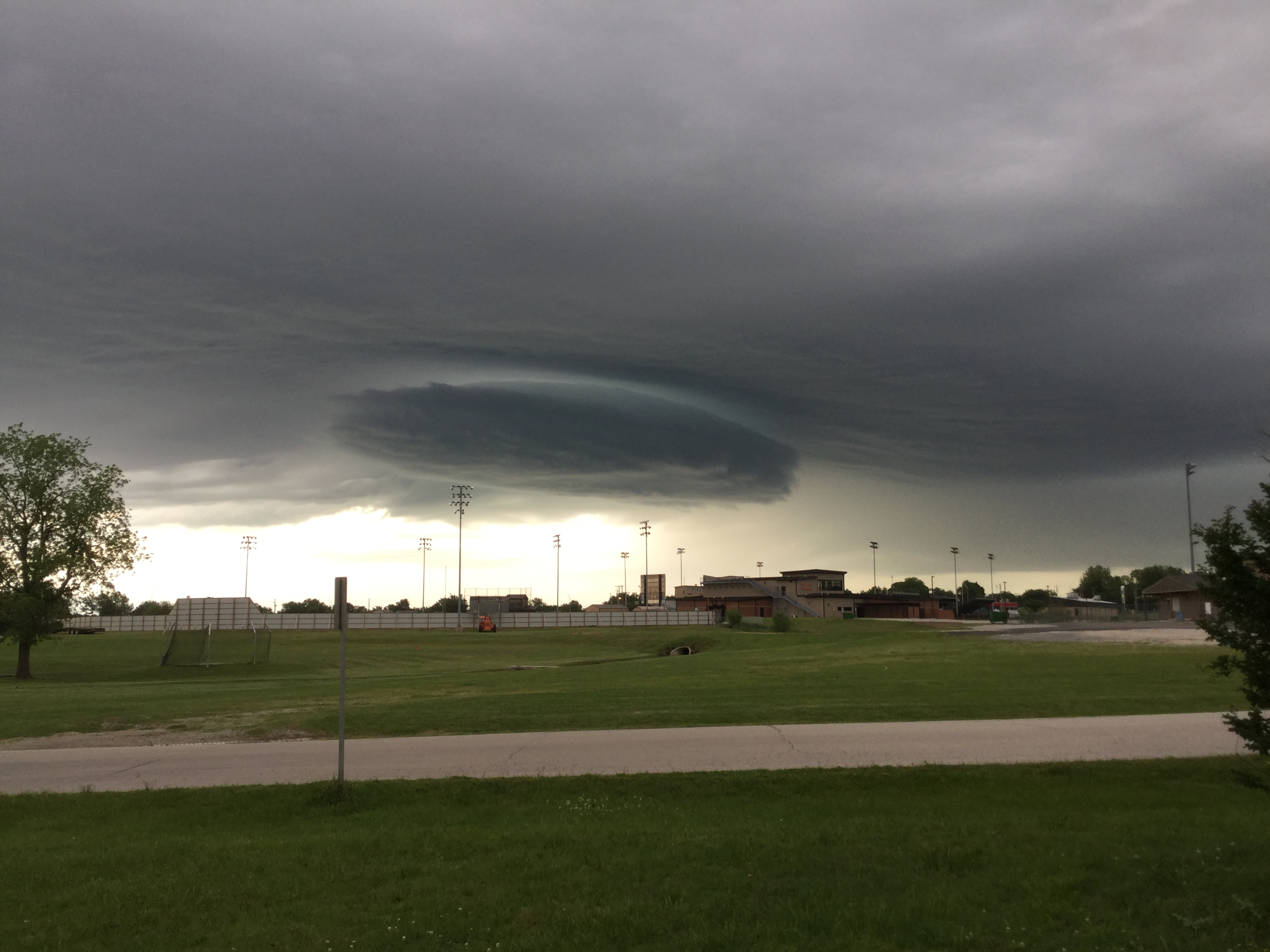
Rotating wall cloud in Oklahoma

Thunderstorms occur throughout the world, even in the polar regions, with the greatest frequency in tropical rainforest areas, where they may occur nearly daily. At any given time, approximately 2,000 thunderstorms are occurring on Earth. Kampala and Tororo in Uganda have each been mentioned as the most thunderous places on Earth, a claim also made for Singapore and Bogor on the Indonesian island of Java. Other cities known for frequent storm activity include Darwin, Caracas, Manila and Mumbai. Thunderstorms are associated with the various monsoon seasons around the globe, and they populate the rainbands of tropical cyclones. In temperate regions, they are most frequent in spring and summer, although they can occur along or ahead of cold fronts at any time of year. They may also occur within a cooler air mass following the passage of a cold front over a relatively warmer body of water. Thunderstorms are rare in polar regions because of cold surface temperatures.

Some of the most powerful thunderstorms over the United States occur in the Midwest and the Southern states. These storms can produce large hail and powerful tornadoes. Thunderstorms are relatively uncommon along much of the West Coast of the United States, but they occur with greater frequency in the inland areas, particularly the Sacramento and San Joaquin Valleys of California. In spring and summer, they occur nearly daily in certain areas of the Rocky Mountains as part of the North American Monsoon regime. In the Northeast, storms take on similar characteristics and patterns as the Midwest, but with less frequency and severity. During the summer, air-mass thunderstorms are an almost daily occurrence over central and southern parts of Florida.

== Energy ==
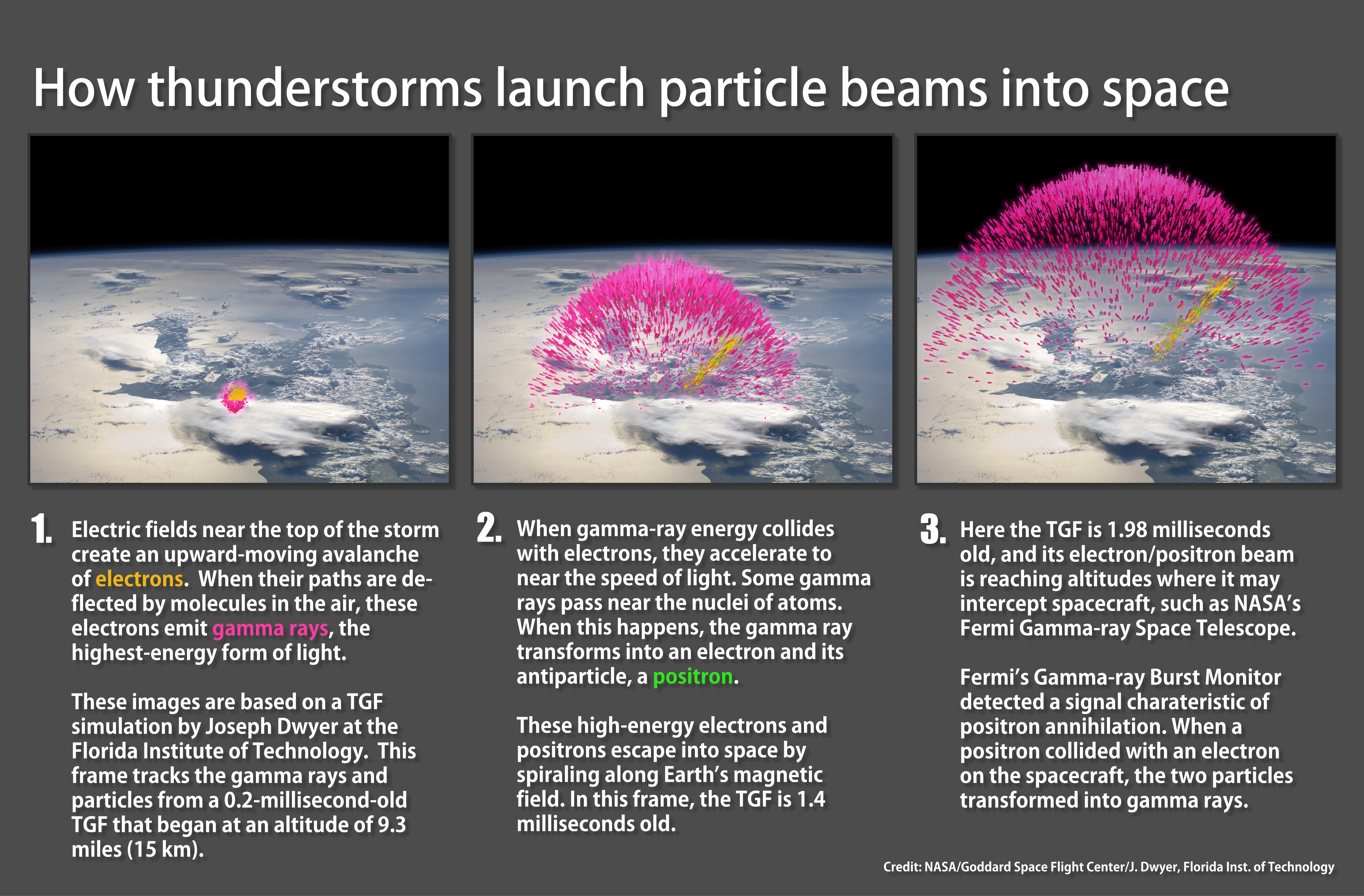
How thunderstorms launch particle beams into space

If the quantity of water that is condensed in and subsequently precipitated from a cloud is known, then the total energy of a thunderstorm can be calculated. In a typical thunderstorm, approximately 5×10^{8} kg of water vapor are lifted, and the amount of energy released when this condenses is 10^{15} joules. This is on the same order of magnitude of energy released within a tropical cyclone, and more energy than that released during the atomic bomb blast at Hiroshima, Japan in 1945.

The Fermi Gamma-ray Burst Monitor results show that gamma rays and antimatter particles (positrons) can be generated in powerful thunderstorms. It is suggested that the antimatter positrons are formed in terrestrial gamma-ray flashes (TGF). TGFs are brief bursts occurring inside thunderstorms and associated with lightning. The streams of positrons and electrons collide higher in the atmosphere to generate more gamma rays. About 500 TGFs may occur every day worldwide, but mostly go undetected.

== Studies ==
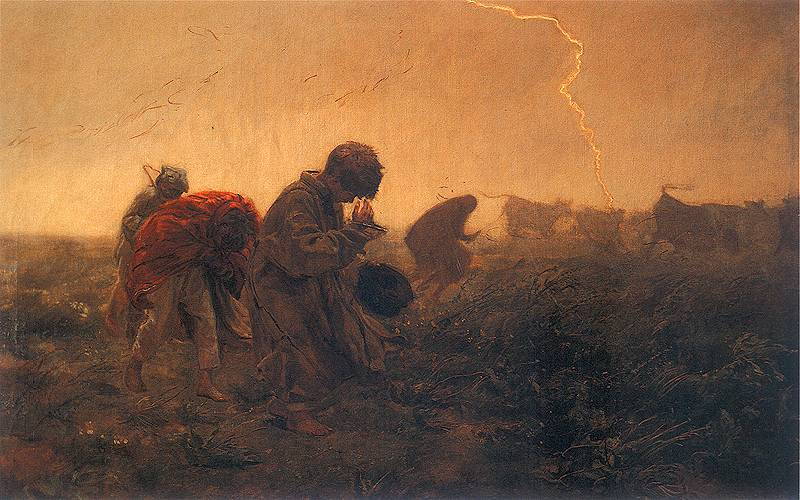
Summer storm in 19th-century Polish countryside – picture by Jozef Chelmonski, 1896, 107 cm (42.1 in)x163 cm (64.1 in), National Museum in Kraków

In more contemporary times, thunderstorms have taken on the role of a scientific curiosity. Every spring, storm chasers head to the Great Plains of the United States and the Canadian Prairies to explore the scientific aspects of storms and tornadoes through use of videotaping. Radio pulses produced by cosmic rays are being used to study how electric charges develop within thunderstorms. More organized meteorological projects such as VORTEX2 use an array of sensors, such as the Doppler on Wheels, vehicles with mounted automated weather stations, weather balloons, and unmanned aircraft to investigate thunderstorms expected to produce severe weather. Lightning is detected remotely using sensors that detect cloud-to-ground lightning strokes with 95 percent accuracy in detection and within 250 metres (820 ft) of their point of origin.

== Mythology and religion ==
Thunderstorms strongly influenced many early civilizations. Greeks believed that they were battles waged by Zeus, who hurled lightning bolts forged by Hephaestus. Some American Indian tribes associated thunderstorms with the Thunderbird, who they believed was a servant of the Great Spirit. The Norse considered thunderstorms to occur when Thor went to fight Jötnar, with the thunder and lightning being the effect of his strikes with the hammer Mjölnir. Hinduism recognizes Indra as the god of rain and thunderstorms. Christian doctrine accepts that fierce storms are the work of God. These ideas were still within the mainstream as late as the 18th century.

Martin Luther was out walking when a thunderstorm began, causing him to pray to God for being saved and promising to become a monk.

== Outside of Earth ==
Thunderstorms, evidenced by flashes of lightning, on Jupiter have been detected and are associated with clouds where water may exist as both a liquid and ice, suggesting a mechanism similar to that on Earth. (Water is a polar molecule that can carry a charge, so it is capable of creating the charge separation needed to produce lightning). These electrical discharges can be up to a thousand times more powerful than lightning on the Earth. The water clouds can form thunderstorms driven by the heat rising from the interior. The clouds of Venus may also be capable of producing lightning; some observations suggest that the lightning rate is at least half of that on Earth.

== See also ==
- Barber's pole
- Continuous gusts
- Convective storm detection
- Derecho
- Hector (cloud)
- Severe thunderstorm warning and Severe thunderstorm watch
- Thundersnow
- Tornado warning
- Tornado watch
- Training (meteorology)
