= A199 autoroute =

Former road in France

Autoroute 199 is a small French motorway connecting Noisy-le-Grand to Torcy. At Noisiel, there is access to the A4 autoroute and N104. Though previously designated "H3", it has been downgraded into "RD 199".

== Junction ==
km	Exit	Destinations	Notes
0.0	1	Torcy	
	2	Val Maubuée	
		Noisiel	Access to A4, N104
		Champs-sur-Marne	
		Noisy-le-Grand via RN370	Road becomes RN370; eastern terminus
1.000 mi = 1.609 km; 1.000 km = 0.621 mi
