= Air-mass thunderstorm =

Thunderstorm that is generally weak and usually not severe

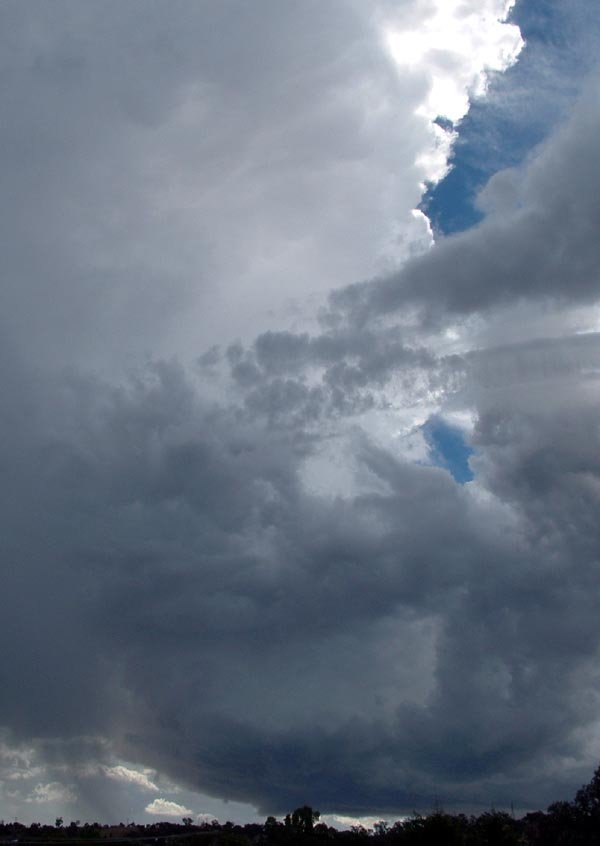
An air-mass thunderstorm over Wagga Wagga.

An air-mass thunderstorm, also called an "ordinary", "single cell", "isolated" or "garden variety" thunderstorm, is a thunderstorm that is generally weak and usually not severe. These storms form in environments where at least some amount of Convective Available Potential Energy (CAPE) is present, but with very low levels of wind shear and helicity. The lifting source, which is a crucial factor in thunderstorm development, is usually the result of uneven heating of the surface, though they can be induced by weather fronts and other low-level boundaries associated with wind convergence. The energy needed for these storms to form comes in the form of insolation, or solar radiation. Air-mass thunderstorms do not move quickly, last no longer than an hour, and have the threats of lightning, as well as showery light, moderate, or heavy rainfall.

Lightning characteristics are related to characteristics of the parent thunderstorm, and could induce wildfires near thunderstorms with minimal rainfall. On unusual occasions, there could be a weak downburst and small hail. They are common in temperate zones during a summer afternoon. Like all thunderstorms, the mean-layered wind field the storms form within determine motion. When the deep-layered wind flow is light, outflow boundary progression will determine storm movement. Since thunderstorms can be a hazard to aviation, pilots are advised to fly above any haze layers within regions of better visibility and to avoid flying under the anvil of these thunderstorms, which can be regions where hail falls from the parent thunderstorm. Vertical wind shear is also a hazard near the base of thunderstorms which have generated outflow boundaries.

== Life cycle ==
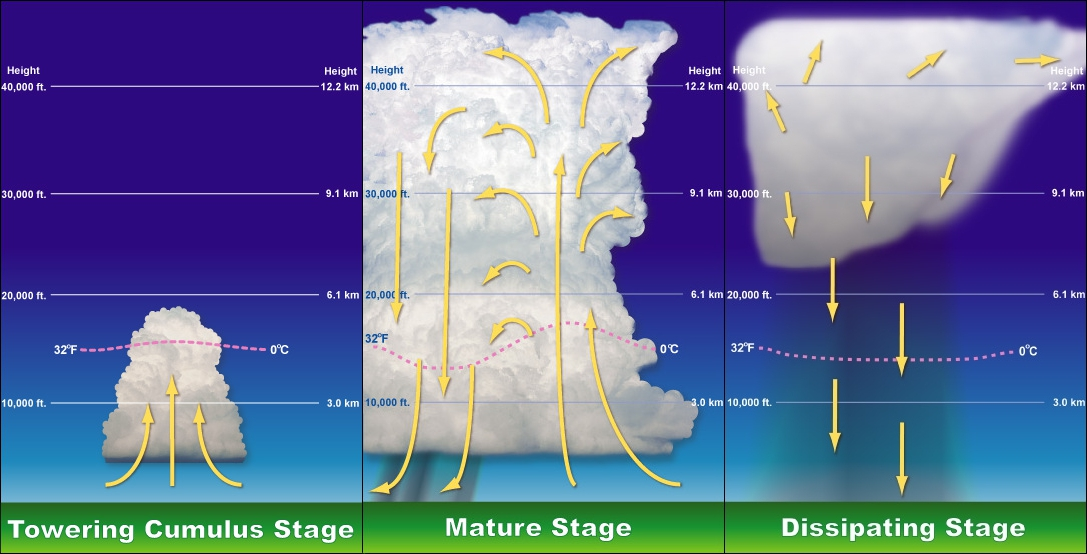
Stages of a thunderstorm's life

The trigger for the lift of the initial cumulus cloud can be insolation heating the ground producing thermals, areas where two winds converge forcing air upwards, or where winds blow over terrain of increasing elevation. The moisture rapidly cools into liquid drops of water due to the cooler temperatures at high altitude, which appears as cumulus clouds. As the water vapor condenses into liquid, latent heat is released which warms the air, causing it to become less dense than the surrounding dry air. The air tends to rise in an updraft through the process of convection (hence the term convective precipitation). This creates a low-pressure zone beneath the forming thunderstorm, otherwise known as a cumulonimbus cloud. In a typical thunderstorm, approximately 5×10^{8} kg of water vapor is lifted into the Earth's atmosphere. As they form in areas of minimal vertical wind shear, the thunderstorm's rainfall creates a moist and relatively cool outflow boundary which undercuts the storm's low level inflow, and quickly causes dissipation. Waterspouts, small hail, and strong wind gusts can occur in association with these thunderstorms.

== Common locations of appearance ==
Also known as single cell thunderstorms, these are the typical summer thunderstorms in many temperate locales. They also occur in the cool unstable air which often follows the passage of a cold front from the sea during winter. Within a cluster of thunderstorms, the term "cell" refers to each separate principal updraft. Thunderstorm cells occasionally form in isolation, as the occurrence of one thunderstorm can develop an outflow boundary which sets up new thunderstorm development. Such storms are rarely severe and are a result of local atmospheric instability; hence the term "air mass thunderstorm". When such storms have a brief period of severe weather associated with them, it is known as a pulse severe storm. Pulse severe storms are poorly organized due to the minimal vertical wind shear in the storm's environment and occur randomly in time and space, making them difficult to forecast. Between formation and dissipation, single cell thunderstorms normally last 20–30 minutes.

== Motion ==
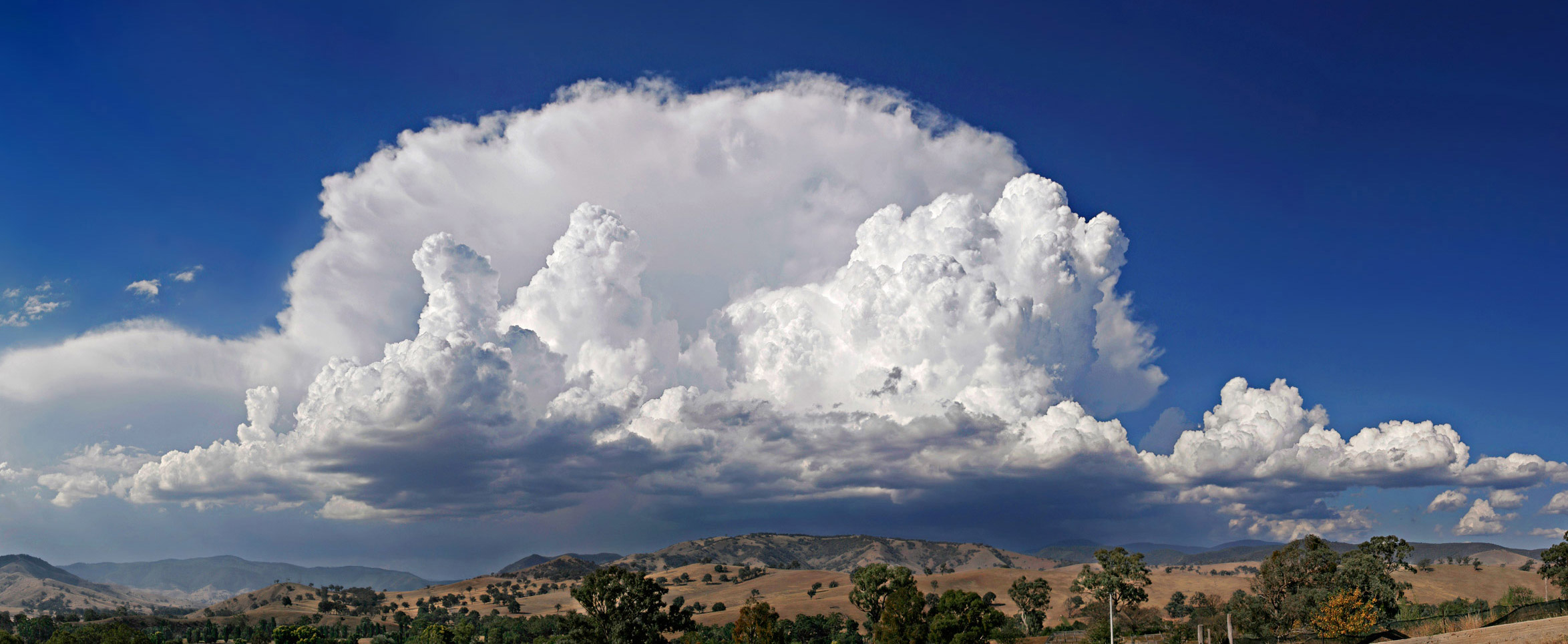
Anvil shaped thundercloud in the mature stage over Swifts Creek, Victoria

The two major ways thunderstorms move are via advection of the wind and propagation along outflow boundaries towards sources of greater heat and moisture. Many thunderstorms move with the mean wind speed through the Earth's troposphere, or the lowest 8 kilometres (5.0 mi) of the Earth's atmosphere. Younger thunderstorms are steered by winds closer to the Earth's surface than more mature thunderstorms as they tend not to be as tall. If the gust front, or leading edge of the outflow boundary, moves ahead of the thunderstorm, the thunderstorm's motion will move in tandem with the gust front. This is more of a factor with thunderstorms with heavy precipitation (HP), such as air-mass thunderstorms. When thunderstorms merge, which is most likely when numerous thunderstorms exist in proximity to each other, the motion of the stronger thunderstorm normally dictates future motion of the merged cell. The stronger the mean wind, the less likely other processes will be involved in storm motion. On weather radar, storms are tracked by using a prominent feature and tracking it from scan to scan.

== Convective precipitation ==
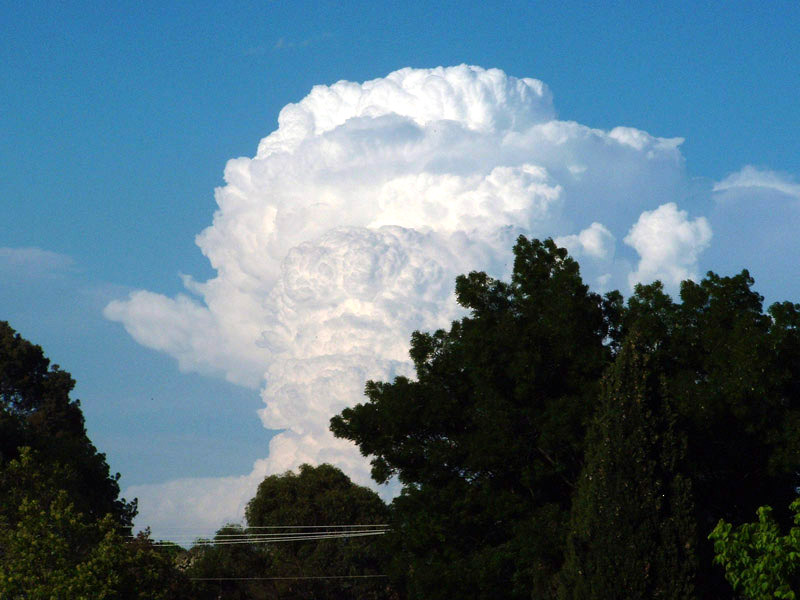
Calvus type cumulonimbus cloud

Convective rain, or showery precipitation, occurs from cumulonimbus clouds. It falls as showers with rapidly changing intensity. Convective precipitation falls over a certain area for a relatively short time, as convective clouds such as thunderstorms have limited horizontal extent. Most precipitation in the tropics appears to be convective. Graupel and hail are good indicators of convective precipitation and thunderstorms. In mid-latitudes, convective precipitation is intermittent and often associated with baroclinic boundaries such as cold fronts, squall lines, and warm fronts. High rainfall rates are associated with thunderstorms with larger raindrops and these leads to fading of microwave echoes, starting above the frequency of 10 gigahertz (GHz) but is more severe above frequencies of 15 GHz, which could lead to misinterpretation of radar intensity of the precipitation.

== Lightning ==
Relationships between lightning frequency and the height of precipitation within thunderstorms have been found. Thunderstorms which show radar returns above 14 kilometres (8.7 mi) in height are associated with storms which have more than ten lightning flashes per minute. There is also a correlation between the total lightning rate and the size of the thunderstorm, its updraft velocity, and amount of graupel over land. The same relationships fail over tropical oceans, however. Lightning from low precipitation (LP) thunderstorms is one of the leading causes of wildfires.

== Aviation concerns ==
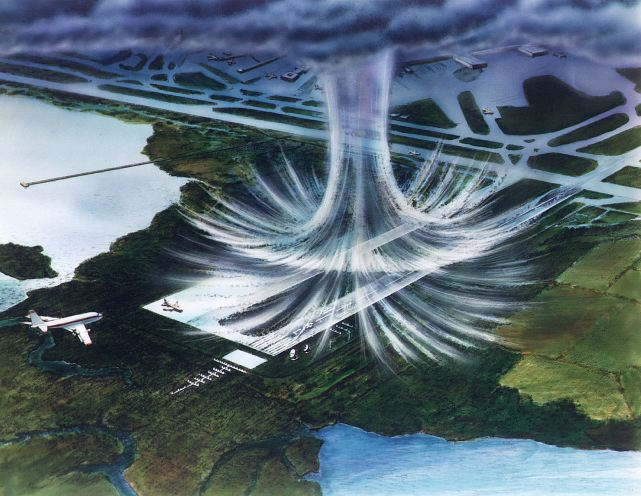
Downward motion of cooler air from thunderstorms spreads outward in all directions when the environmental wind flow is light

In areas where these thunderstorms form in isolation and horizontal visibility is good, pilots can evade these storms rather easily. In more moist atmospheres which become hazy, pilots navigate above the haze layer in order to get a better vantage point of these storms. Flying under the anvil of thunderstorms is not advised, as hail is more likely to fall in such areas outside the thunderstorm's main rain shaft. When an outflow boundary forms due to a shallow layer of rain-cooled air spreading out near ground level from the parent thunderstorm, both speed and directional wind shear can result at the leading edge of the three-dimensional boundary. The stronger the outflow boundary is, the stronger the resultant vertical wind shear will become.

== See also ==
- Heat lightning
