= Lycée Jean Moulin (Torcy, Seine-et-Marne) =

Parisian high school

Lycée Jean Moulin is a senior high school in Torcy, Seine-et-Marne, in the Paris metropolitan area. It first opened in 1985.

As of 2011, the school was under capacity, as it had 508 students even though the school had space for 1,000 students. At the same time, the student populations of Lycée Martin-Luther-King in Bussy-Saint-Georges and Lycée Emilie-Brontë in Lognes were increasing.
