= Torcy, Seine-et-Marne =

Torcy
- Subprefecture and commune
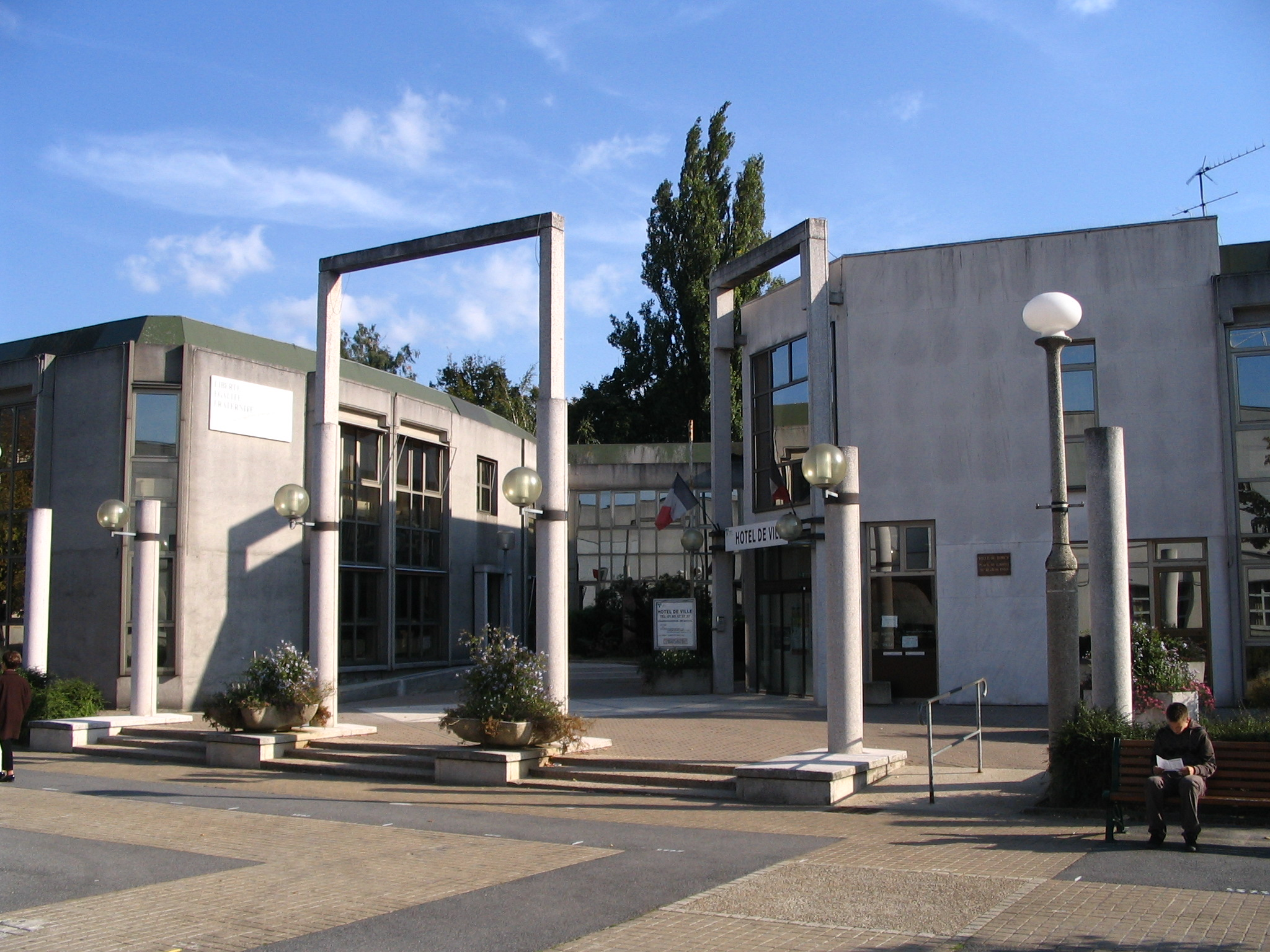
- The Hôtel de Ville

- Coat of arms

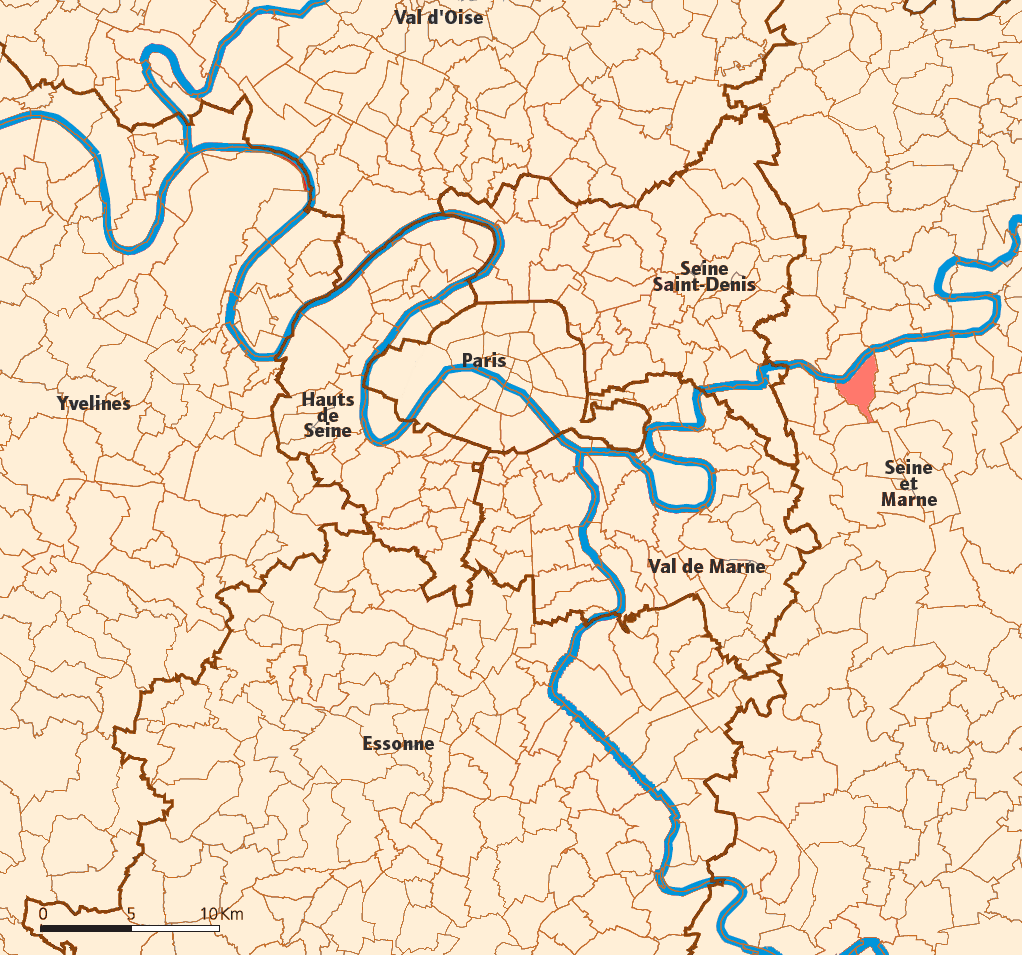
- Location (in red) within Paris inner and outer suburbs
- Location of Torcy
- Location within France Location within Île-de-France (region)
- Coordinates: 48°51′01″N 2°39′03″E
- Country: France
- Region: Île-de-France
- Department: Seine-et-Marne
- Arrondissement: Torcy
- Canton: Torcy
- Intercommunality: CA Paris - Vallée de la Marne

Government
  - Mayor (2020–2026): Guillaume Le Lay-Felzine
- Area^{1}: 6.00 km^{2} (2.32 sq mi)
- Highest elevation: 106 m (348 ft)
- Lowest elevation: 37 m (121 ft)
- Population (2023): 22,810
  - Density: 3,800/km^{2} (9,850/sq mi)
- Time zone: UTC+01:00 (CET)
  - Summer (DST): UTC+02:00 (CEST)
- INSEE/Postal code: 77468 /77200
- ^{1} French Land Register data, which excludes lakes, ponds, glaciers > 1 km^{2} (0.386 sq mi or 247 acres) and river estuaries.

Torcy (French pronunciation: [tɔʁsi]) is a commune in the Seine-et-Marne department, Île-de-France, north-central France. It is located in the eastern suburbs of Paris, 21.8 km (13.5 mi) from the center of Paris.

Torcy is a sub-prefecture of the department and the seat of an arrondissement. The commune of Torcy is part of the Val Maubuée sector, one of the four sectors in the "new town" of Marne-la-Vallée.

== History ==
The Hôtel de Ville was completed in 1986.

== Transport ==
Torcy is served by Torcy station on Paris RER line A.

== Demographics ==
Inhabitants of Torcy are called Torcéens in French.

The suburbanization and affluence of the Vietnamese population in France has resulted in a demographic shift in Torcy since the 1980s. Vietnamese businesses and community organizations have been established in Torcy, and the commune, along with nearby Ivry-sur-Seine, contains one of the highest concentrations of Vietnamese people in France at 10% to 20% of the population. As of 1998, about 5-6% of the city's population is made up of East Asians.

Historical population

Year	Pop.	±% p.a.
1793	725	—
1800	703	−0.44%
1806	701	−0.05%
1821	758	+0.52%
1831	695	−0.86%
1836	703	+0.23%
1841	692	−0.31%
1846	715	+0.66%
1851	727	+0.33%
1856	812	+2.24%
1861	796	−0.40%
1866	863	+1.63%
1872	865	+0.04%
1876	979	+3.14%
1881	1,171	+3.65%
1886	1,220	+0.82%
1891	1,416	+3.02%
1896	1,405	−0.16%
1901	1,499	+1.30%

Year	Pop.	±% p.a.
1906	1,726	+2.86%
1911	1,795	+0.79%
1921	1,901	+0.58%
1926	1,971	+0.73%
1931	1,993	+0.22%
1936	1,883	−1.13%
1946	1,857	−0.14%
1954	2,212	+2.21%
1962	3,221	+4.81%
1968	3,401	+0.91%
1975	4,800	+5.05%
1982	12,279	+14.36%
1990	18,681	+5.39%
1999	21,595	+1.62%
2007	22,117	+0.30%
2012	23,471	+1.20%
2017	22,568	−0.78%
2023	22,810	+0.18%

Source: EHESS and INSEE (1968-2023)

== Education ==
There are ten public primary school groups (preschool and elementary) in Torcy, along with three junior high schools and one senior high school.

Junior high schools:

- Collège de l'Arche-Guédon
- Collège Louis-Aragon
- Collège Victor-Schoelcher

Senior high school

- Lycée Jean-Moulin

== See also ==
- Communes of the Seine-et-Marne department
