= Val d'Europe =

New town in France, near Disneyland Paris

Coordinates: 48°51′13″N 2°46′47″E

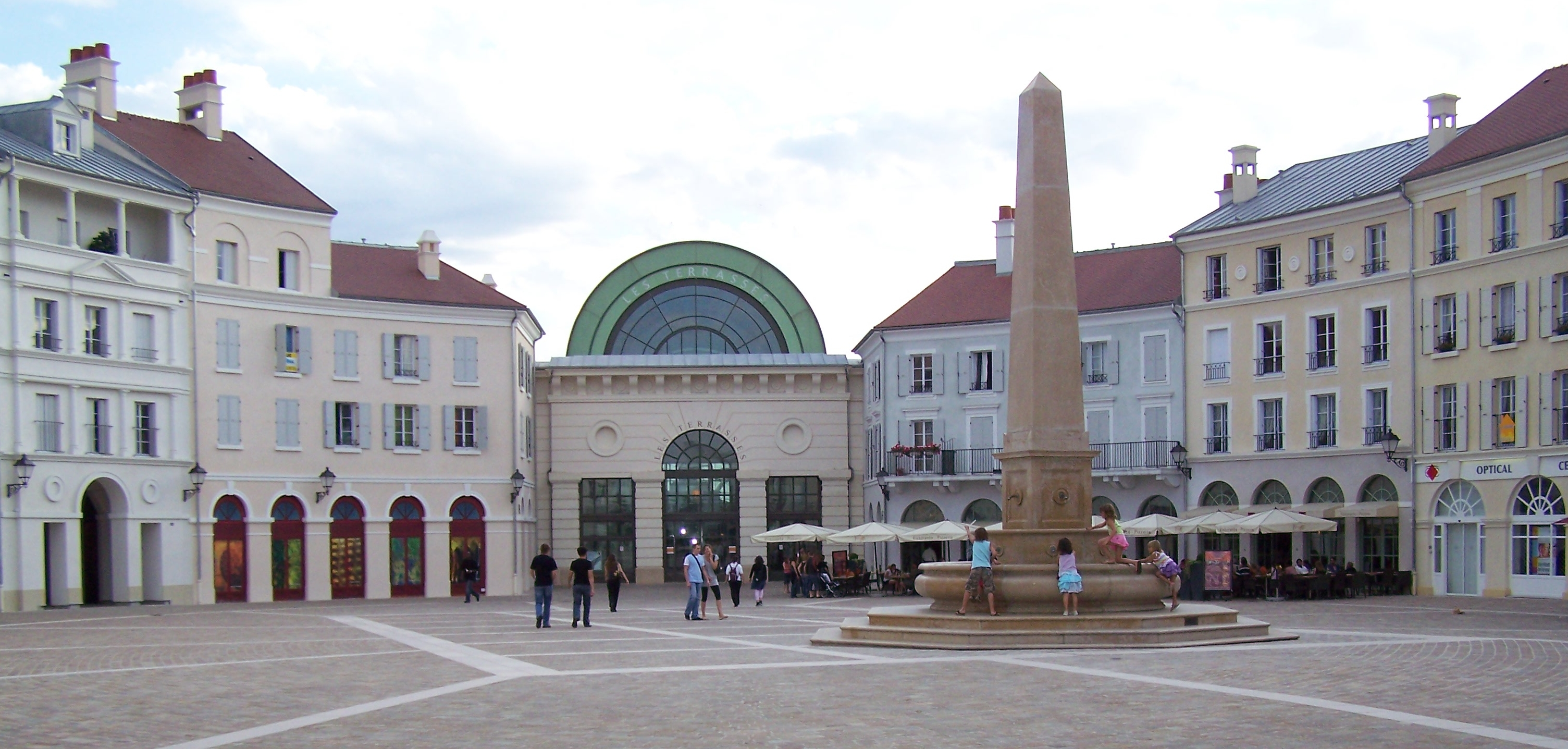
Place de Toscane in Serris, Val d'Europe, designed by new classical architect Pier Carlo Bontempi in 2002

Val d'Europe (pronounced [val døʁɔp]; lit. 'Vale of Europe') is the easternmost sector (Secteur IV) of the new town of Marne-la-Vallée, located around 35 km (22 mi) to the east of the city centre of Paris, France. It was built as part of a public–private partnership between The Walt Disney Company and the French state, based on a convention signed in 1987. It is bordered by the Marne river to the north, the A4 motorway to the south, and is served by the RER A suburban train line (stations Marne-la-Vallée–Chessy (opened 1992) and Val d'Europe (opened 2001)) as well as the LGV Interconnexion Est high-speed train line (station Marne-la-Vallée–Chessy).

== Description ==
Val d'Europe is made up of six communes, which have grouped together to form a town council. Five of them — Bailly-Romainvilliers, Chessy, Coupvray, Magny-le-Hongre, and Serris — form the historical territory of sector IV. The sixth commune, Villeneuve-le-Comte, joined the general interest project in 2011. These communes, as well as four neighbouring ones, are grouped into an urban community, called Val d'Europe Agglomeration (VEA).

The area is primarily given over to Disneyland Park, as per the contract between the government and The Walt Disney Company. One of the terms was that the Euro Disney Resort (now Disneyland Paris) immediately got 19.40 km^{2} (7.49 sq mi) of land to build Festival Disney (now named Disney Village).

The Walt Disney Company is the only company within France that has had such a large say in the development of an urban area of this scale. The government was represented by an EPA (governmental development company). Disney has also contributed to the development of the new town Marne-la-Vallée.

Communes of Val d'Europe

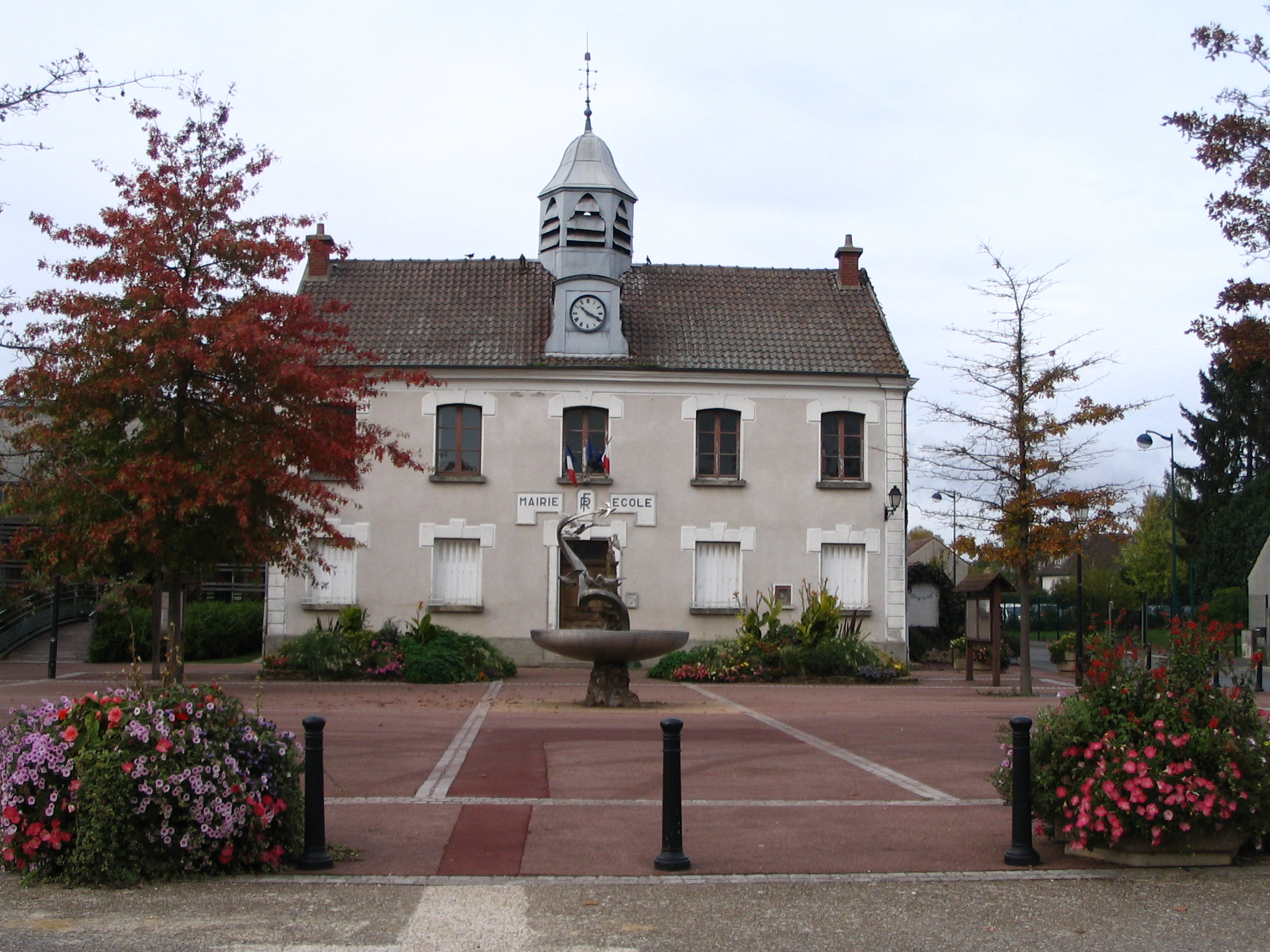
Bailly-Romainvilliers

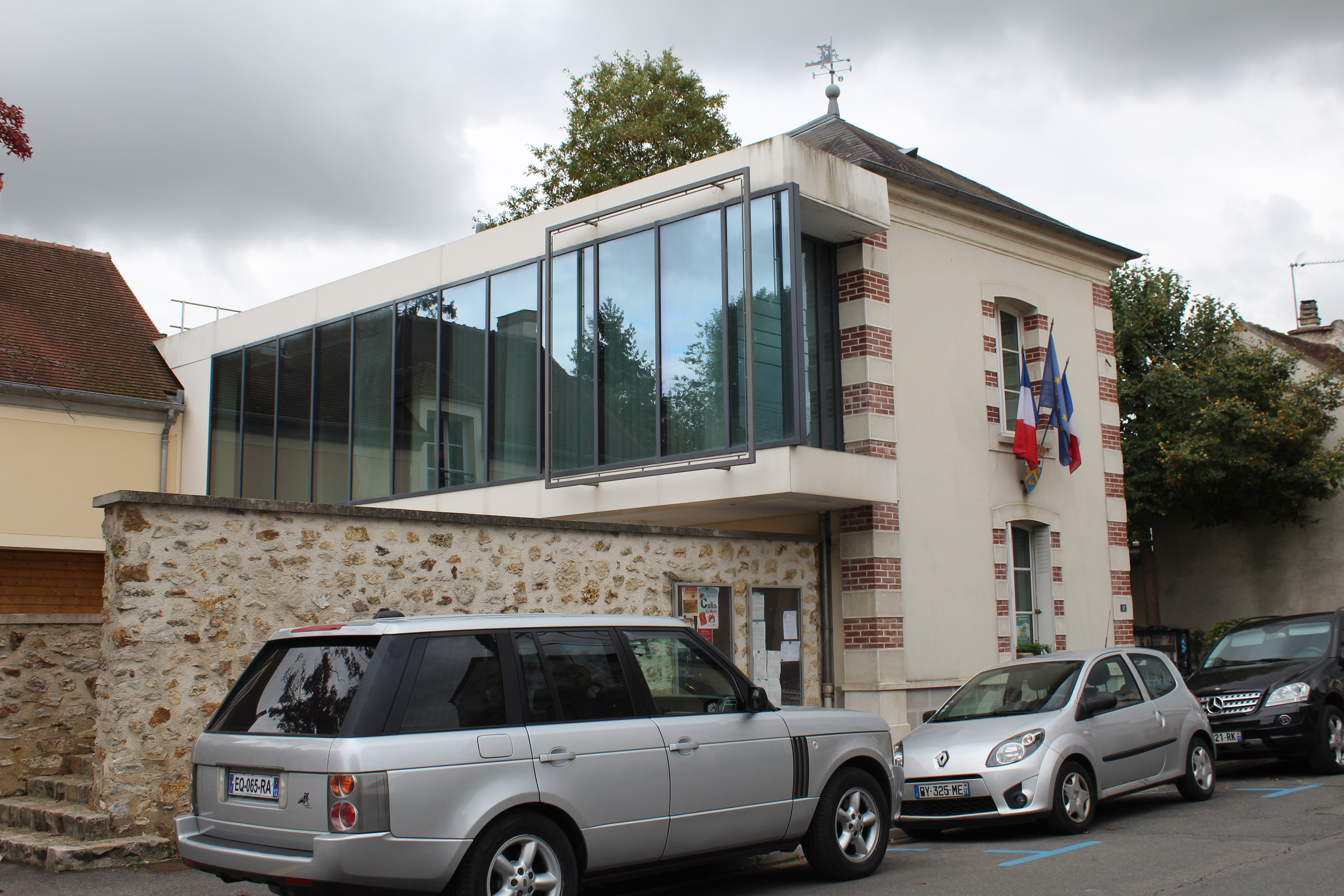
Chessy

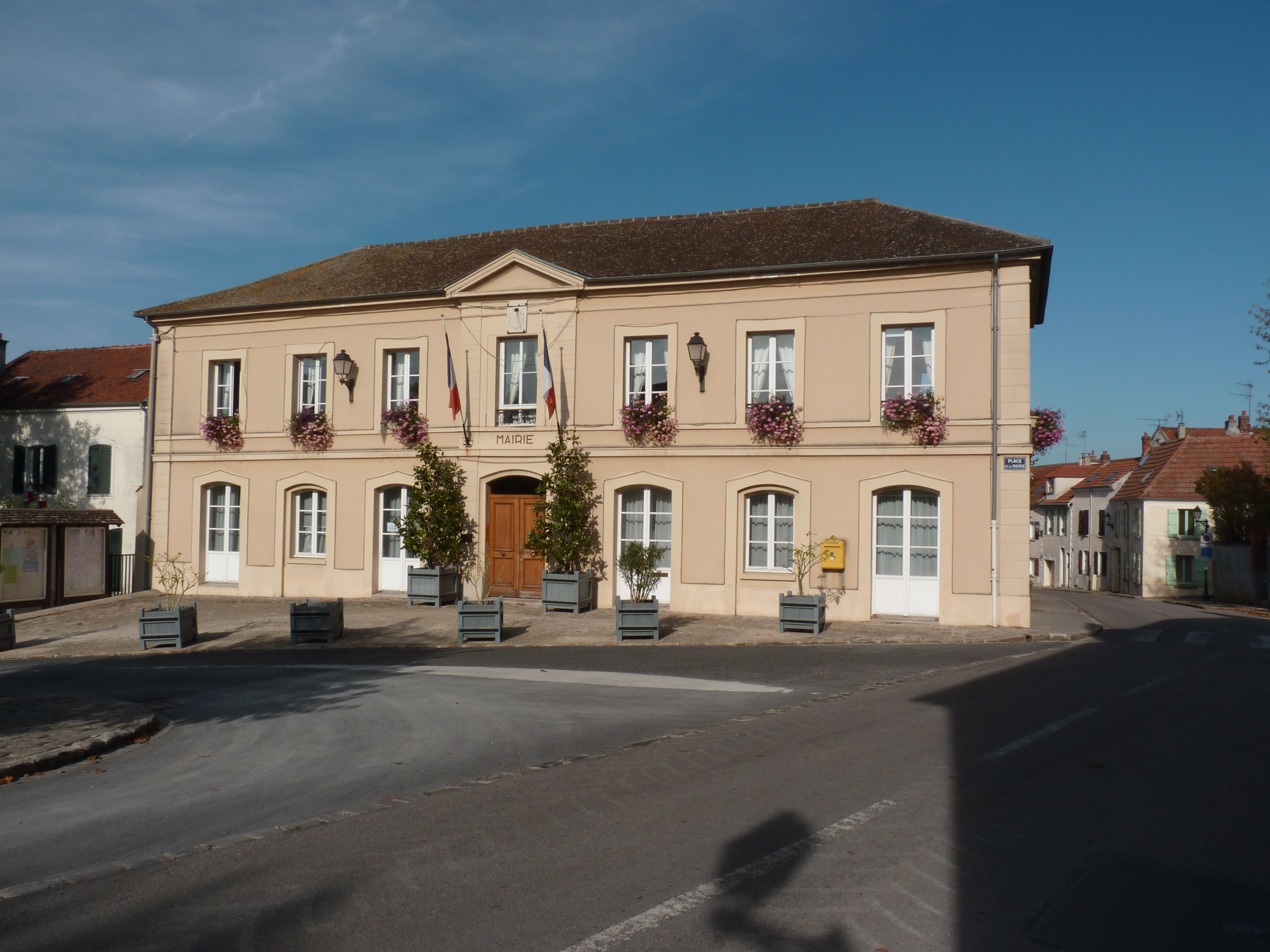
Coupvray

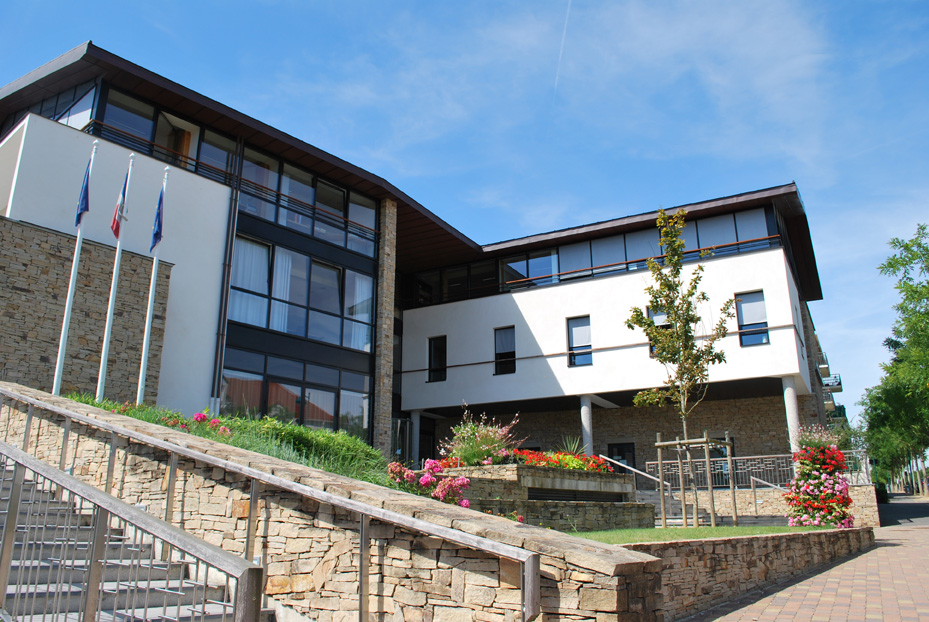
Magny-le-Hongre

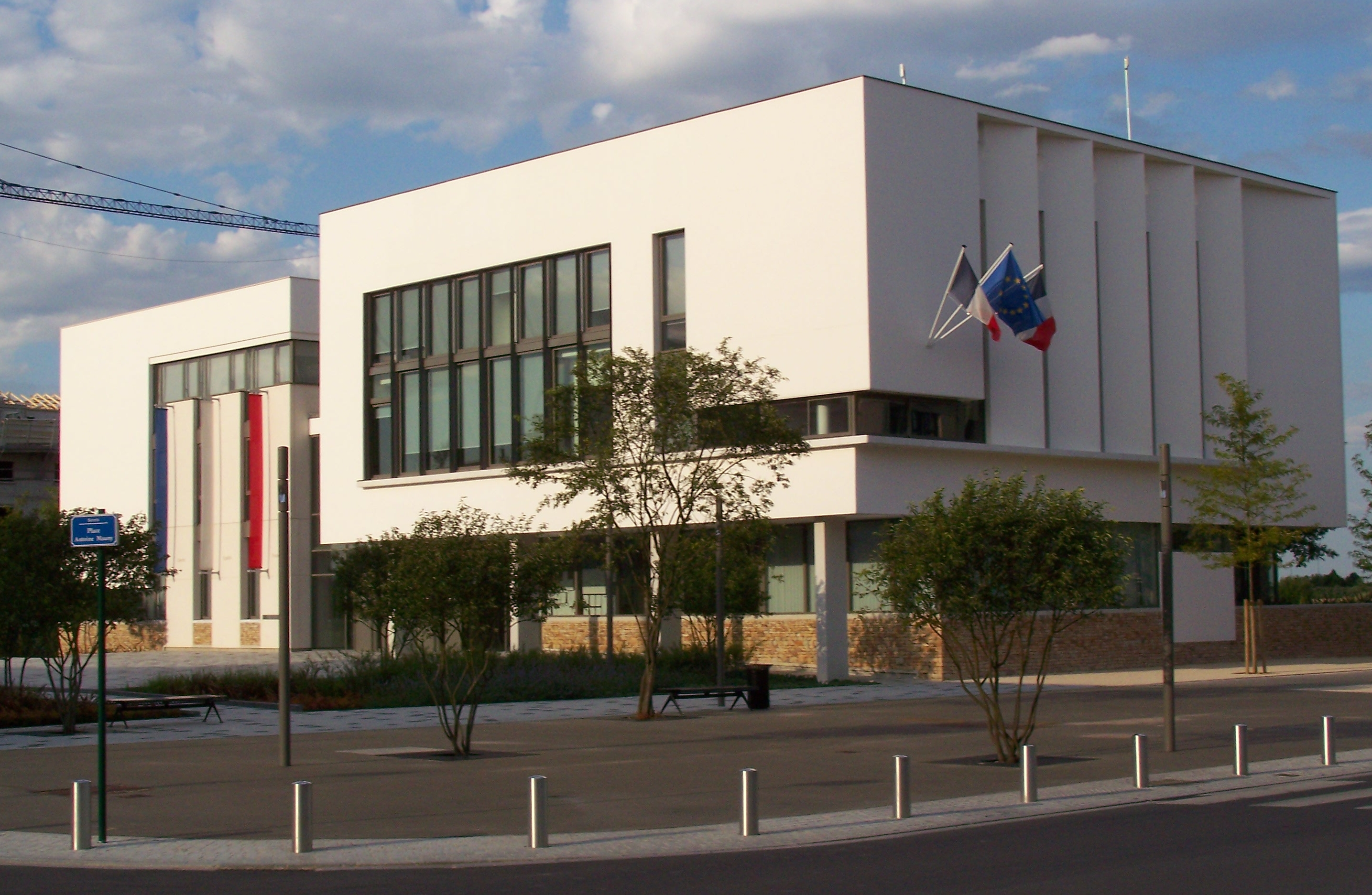
Serris

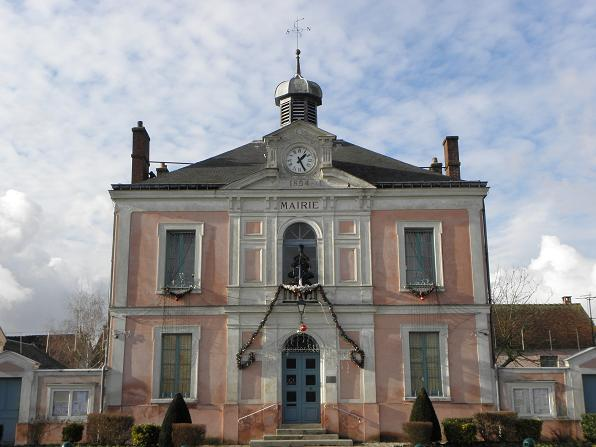
Villeneuve-le-Comte

== History ==
The building work started in 1987, after Jacques Chirac (then French prime minister) and Disney signed the contract. Val d'Europe was to be opened with the Euro Disney Resort in 1992.

As of 2005, Val d'Europe had a population of 19,700 people, increasing to 37,008 by 2019. 19.43 km^{2} (7.50 sq mi) out of 30.00 km^{2} (11.58 sq mi) is set aside for development by Disney. The Walt Disney Company has spent €5 billion, compared to €500 million from the French government.

The architectural style takes inspiration from the "neo-traditional" style of Baron Haussmann, who supervised the construction of many buildings in Paris in the 19th century. The town plan, by the firm of a Driehaus Prize winner, Cooper, Robertson & Partners of New York City, was designed based upon traditional French town planning principles consistent with the New Urbanism, a design philosophy which is frequently used in the United States and used with the intent to plan new cities based upon known working principles studied by architects. Disney had previously created a New Urbanist city in Florida, known as Celebration, also designed by Cooper, Robertson & Partners. Val d'Europe and Celebration can be seen as descendants of Walt Disney's original 1960s plans for a city of the future, the Experimental Prototype Community of Tomorrow (EPCOT).

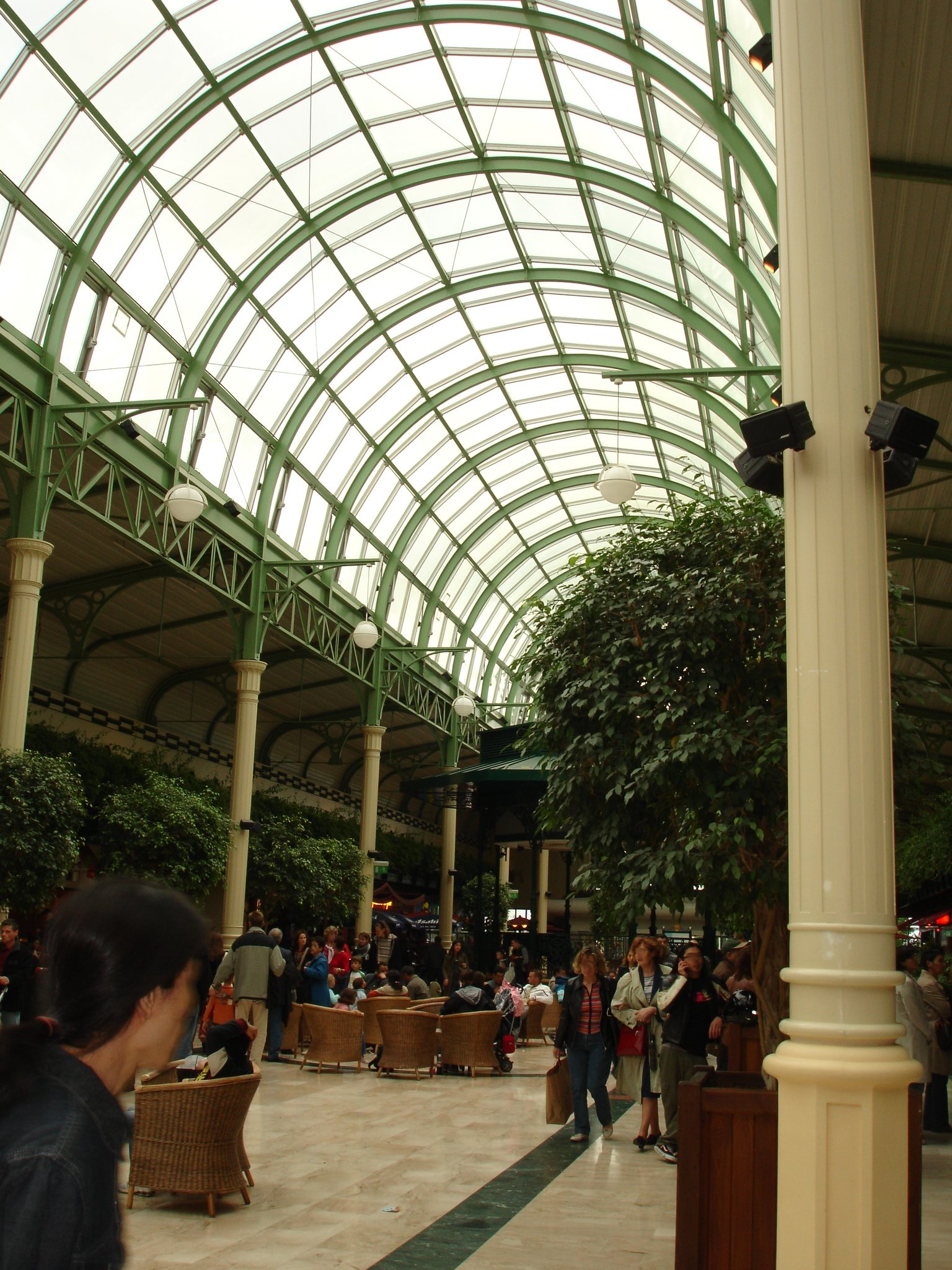
Val d'Europe shopping mall

== Shopping centre ==
In 2000, a large shopping centre also named Val d'Europe opened. It features 190 shops, 30 restaurants, a large Auchan hypermarket and a Sea Life aquarium.

== See also ==
- Golden Oak at Walt Disney World Resort, a concept high-end resort living community within the Walt Disney World resort
- Celebration, Florida, a census-designated place (CDP) and a master-planned community in Osceola County, Florida, United States, located near Walt Disney World Resort and originally developed by The Walt Disney Company.
