= Chessy, Seine-et-Marne =

Chessy
- Commune
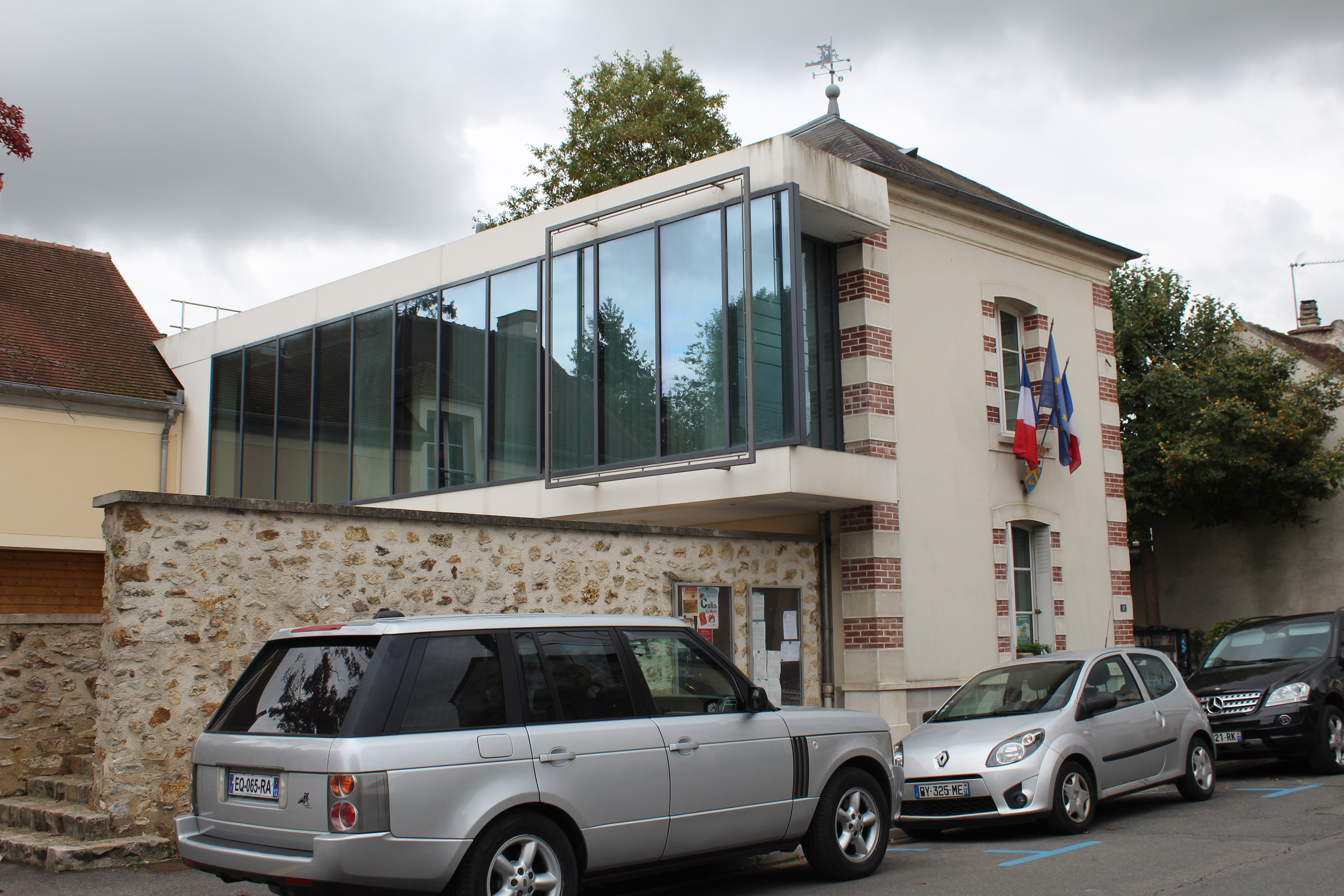
- The town hall in Chessy

- Coat of arms

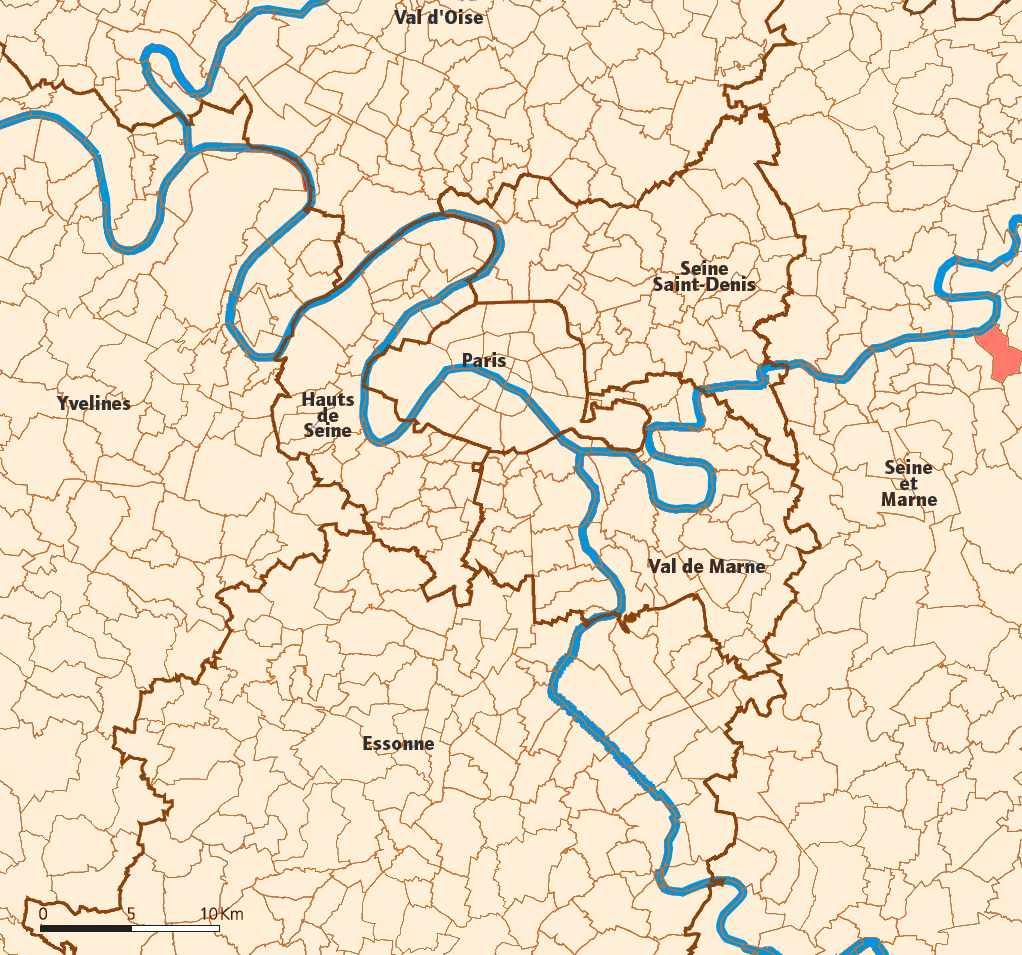
- Location (in red) within Paris inner and outer suburbs
- Location of Chessy
- Location within France Location within Île-de-France (region)
- Coordinates: 48°52′50″N 2°45′52″E
- Country: France
- Region: Île-de-France
- Department: Seine-et-Marne
- Arrondissement: Torcy
- Canton: Serris
- Intercommunality: Val d'Europe Agglomération

Government
  - Mayor (2026–32): Cyril Marsaud
- Area^{1}: 5.74 km^{2} (2.22 sq mi)
- Highest elevation: 130 m (430 ft)
- Lowest elevation: 37 m (121 ft)
- Population (2023): 7,771
  - Density: 1,350/km^{2} (3,510/sq mi)
- Demonym: Cassassiens
- Time zone: UTC+01:00 (CET)
  - Summer (DST): UTC+02:00 (CEST)
- INSEE/Postal code: 77111 /77700
- Website: www.chessy77.fr
- ^{1} French Land Register data, which excludes lakes, ponds, glaciers > 1 km^{2} (0.386 sq mi or 247 acres) and river estuaries.

Chessy (French pronunciation: [ʃɛsi]) is a commune in the eastern outer suburbs of Paris, on the left bank of the Marne in the Seine-et-Marne department in the Île-de-France region in north-central France. It is located 30.6 km (19.0 mi) from the centre of Paris.

Chessy is famous as the location of Disneyland Paris, which lies for the most part on the territory of the commune. Chessy is located in Val d'Europe, the fastest growing sector in the "new town" of Marne-la-Vallée.

== Demographics ==
A village of only 760 inhabitants in 1982, Chessy was since then absorbed by the suburbs of Paris. The inhabitants are called Cassassiens in French.

Historical population
Year	Pop.	±% p.a.
1968	462	—
1975	582	+3.35%
1982	760	+3.89%
1990	1,124	+5.01%
1999	1,667	+4.48%
2007	3,438	+9.47%
2012	4,517	+5.61%
2017	5,633	+4.51%
2023	7,771	+5.51%
Source: INSEE

== Transport ==
Chessy is served by two stations on Paris RER line:

- Val d'Europe
- Marne-la-Vallée–Chessy (this station is located at the hub area of Disneyland Paris).

Marne-la-Vallée–Chessy station is also served by high speed trains towards Lille, Lyon, Nantes and Bordeaux.

== Education ==
Three preschool and elementary schools, L'école maternelle et élémentaire Cornélius, L'école maternelle et élémentaire Gaïus, and L'école maternelle et élémentaire Tournesol, are in Chessy.

There is a junior high school in Chessy, Collège Le vieux Chêne. Nearby is the Collège Jacqueline de Romilly in Magny-le-Hongre.

Senior high schools in the surrounding area include Lycée Emilie Brontë in Lognes, Lycée Emilie du Châtelet in Serris, Lycée Pierre de Coubertin in Meaux, Lycée Martin Luther King in Bussy-Saint-Georges, Lycée René Cassin in Noisiel, and Lycée Van Dongen in Lagny-sur-Marne. Vocational high schools in the surrounding area include Emilie du Châtelet, Lycée technique Pierre de Coubertin, LEP Auguste Perdonnet in Thorigny-sur-Marne, LEP Charles Baudelaire in Meaux, and LEP Louis Lumière in Chelles.

== Politics ==
Chessy is a part of Seine-et-Marne's 8th constituency.

== See also ==
- Communes of the Seine-et-Marne department
