= Bailly-Romainvilliers =

- Commune
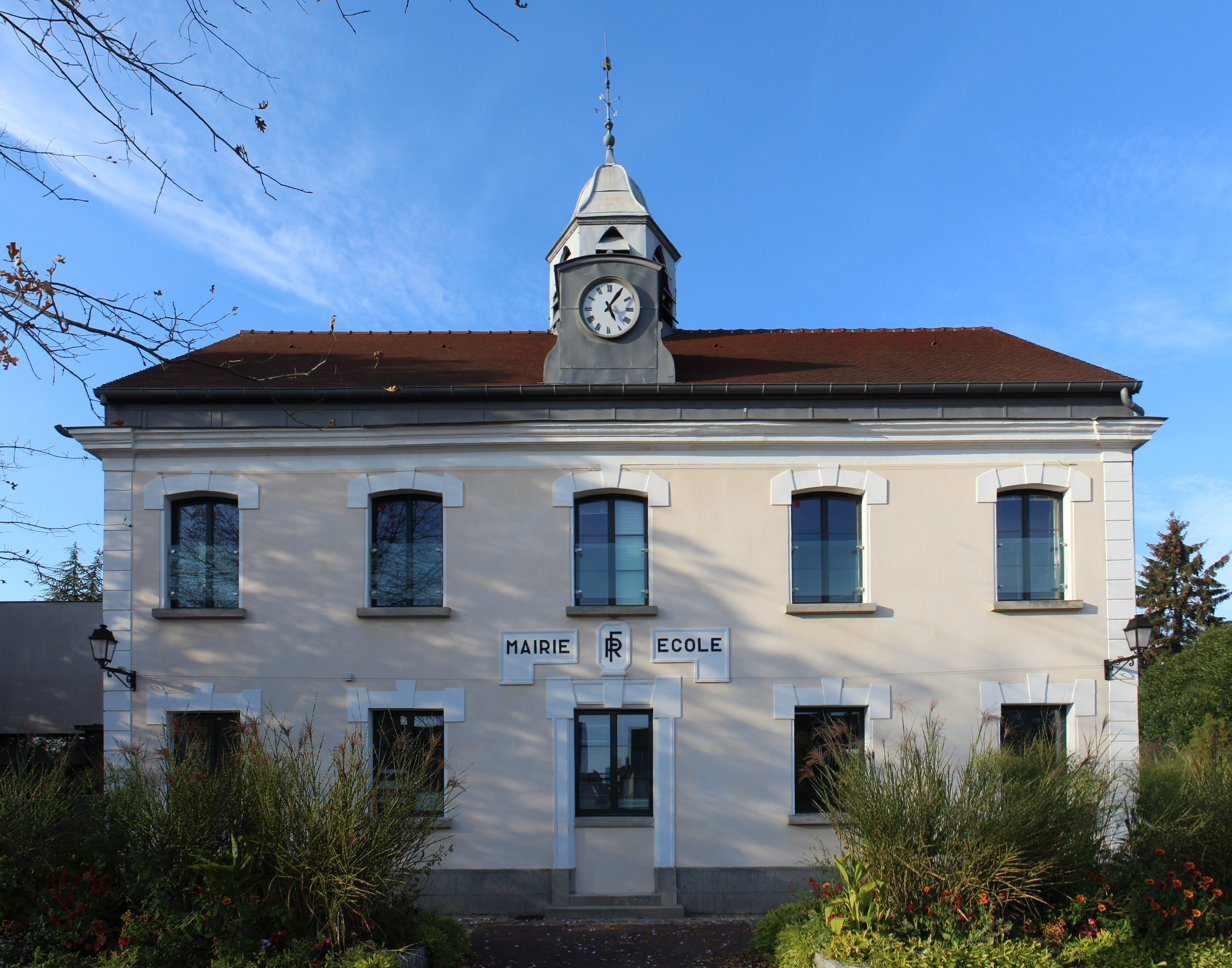
- The town hall in Bailly-Romainvilliers
- Location of Bailly-Romainvilliers
- Location within France Location within Île-de-France (region)
- Coordinates: 48°50′25″N 2°48′41″E
- Country: France
- Region: Île-de-France
- Department: Seine-et-Marne
- Arrondissement: Torcy
- Canton: Serris
- Intercommunality: Val d'Europe Agglomération

Government
  - Mayor (2020–2026): Anne Gbiorczyk
- Area^{1}: 6.21 km^{2} (2.40 sq mi)
- Highest elevation: 140 m (460 ft)
- Lowest elevation: 125 m (410 ft)
- Population (2023): 6,980
  - Density: 1,120/km^{2} (2,910/sq mi)
- Time zone: UTC+01:00 (CET)
  - Summer (DST): UTC+02:00 (CEST)
- INSEE/Postal code: 77018 /77700
- ^{1} French Land Register data, which excludes lakes, ponds, glaciers > 1 km^{2} (0.386 sq mi or 247 acres) and river estuaries.

Bailly-Romainvilliers (French: [baji ʁɔmɛ̃vilje]) is a commune in the Seine-et-Marne department in the Île-de-France region in north-central France.

== Demographics ==
The inhabitants of the town of Bailly-Romainvilliers are called Romainvillersois, Romainvillersoises in French. Bailly-Romainvilliers is home to a Marriott complex of villas. The town is a popular place to stay, because of its convenient location near Disneyland Paris, and Paris itself. The shopping precinct is home to a bakery, parking facilities and a Carrefour Market supermarket.

Historical population
Year	Pop.	±% p.a.
1968	245	—
1975	371	+6.11%
1982	402	+1.15%
1990	609	+5.33%
1999	3,393	+21.03%
2007	5,666	+6.62%
2012	7,175	+4.84%
2017	7,521	+0.95%
2023	6,980	−1.24%
Source: INSEE

== Schools ==
The community has three primary schools, Alizés, Coloriades, and Girandoles; as well as one junior high school, Collège Les Blés d'Or.

Lycée Émilie du Châtelet, the area senior high school/sixth-form college, is in nearby Serris.

== See also ==
- Communes of the Seine-et-Marne department
