= Bontempi (surname) =

Bontempi is a surname. Notable people with the surname include:

- Checco Bontempi, Italian musician and producer, member of the group Corona and records under the alias Lee Marrow
- Giovanni Andrea Bontempi (c. 1624 – 1705), Italian singer, composer and music theorist
- Guido Bontempi (born 1960), Italian cyclist
- Paola Bontempi (born 1971), Spanish actress
- Gianluca Bontempi (born 1968), Italian professor in Machine Learning Group, Université Libre de Bruxelles, director of Interuniversity Institute of Bioinformatics in Brussels from 2013 to 2017
- Pier Carlo Bontempi (born 1954), Italian traditionalist architect
- Teresina Bontempi (1883–1968), Swiss writer, editor and journalist
