= Magny-le-Hongre =

- Commune
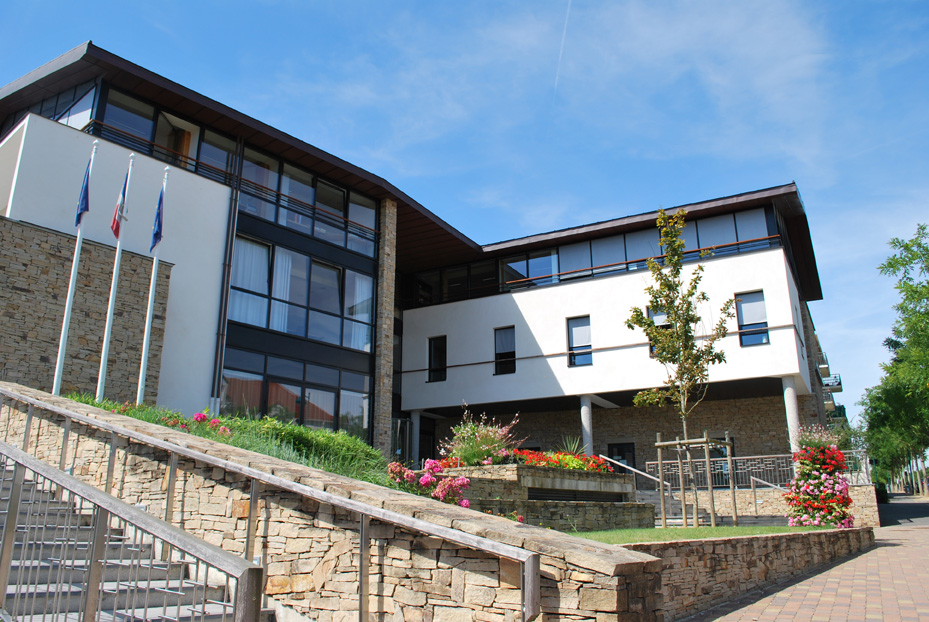
- The town hall in Magny-le-Hongre
- Location of Magny-le-Hongre
- Location within France Location within Île-de-France (region)
- Coordinates: 48°51′47″N 2°48′48″E
- Country: France
- Region: Île-de-France
- Department: Seine-et-Marne
- Arrondissement: Torcy
- Canton: Serris
- Intercommunality: Val d'Europe Agglomération

Government
  - Mayor (2020–2026): Véronique Flament-Bjarstal
- Area^{1}: 4.66 km^{2} (1.80 sq mi)
- Highest elevation: 135 m (443 ft)
- Lowest elevation: 65 m (213 ft)
- Population (2023): 9,060
  - Density: 1,940/km^{2} (5,040/sq mi)
- Time zone: UTC+01:00 (CET)
  - Summer (DST): UTC+02:00 (CEST)
- INSEE/Postal code: 77268 /77700
- ^{1} French Land Register data, which excludes lakes, ponds, glaciers > 1 km^{2} (0.386 sq mi or 247 acres) and river estuaries.

Magny-le-Hongre (French pronunciation: [maɲi lə ɔ̃ɡʁ]) is a commune in the Seine-et-Marne department in the Île-de-France region in north-central France. It is part of Val d'Europe Agglomération together with the communes of Bailly-Romainvilliers, Chessy, Coupvray and Serris.

== Demographics ==
Historical population
| Year | Pop. | ±% p.a. |
|---|---|---|
| 1968 | 121 | — |
| 1975 | 223 | +9.13% |
| 1982 | 264 | +2.44% |
| 1990 | 331 | +2.87% |
| 1999 | 1,791 | +20.64% |
| 2007 | 5,158 | +14.14% |
| 2012 | 7,148 | +6.74% |
| 2017 | 8,645 | +3.88% |
| 2023 | 9,060 | +0.78% |
Source: INSEE

Inhabitants are called Hongrémaniens in French.

== Education ==
There are four groups of preschools and elementary schools in Magny: Charles Fauvet, Éric Tabarly, Les Semailles, and Simone Veil. The commune has one junior high school, Collège Jacqueline de Romilly.

The area high school/sixth-form college is Lycée Emilie du Châtelet in Serris.

== See also ==
- Communes of the Seine-et-Marne department
