= Pier Carlo Bontempi =

Italian architect

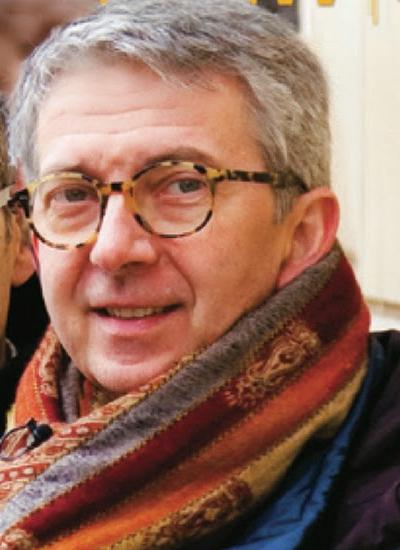
- Born: 1954 (age 71–72); Fornovo di Taro, Italy
- Occupation: Architect
- Awards: Driehaus Architecture Prize
- Projects: Parma urban quarters, Place de Toscane and Quartier du Lac resort in Val d'Europe

Pier Carlo Bontempi (born 1954) is an Italian architect.

He is a representative of New Urbanism and New Classical Architecture, with a particular emphasis on urban context and the continuity of architectural traditions.

Bontempi was awarded the 12th Driehaus Architecture Prize at a ceremony in the Murphy Auditorium of Chicago on 29 March 2014.

Bontempi's office is located close to the town of Collecchio, Province of Parma in Emilia-Romagna, Italy. His studio works on new traditional architecture include restoration, rebuilding and town planning, with award-winning urban old town developments in Parma, the Place de Toscane and the Quartier du Lac resort in Val d'Europe.

== Career ==
Bontempi studied architecture at the University of Florence. During his career, he has subsequently taught at the Architecture Faculty of Florence, the École Spéciale d'Architecture in Paris, Syracuse University Abroad Center in Florence, the State Academy of Art and Design in Stuttgart, and the Prince of Wales’ Foundation for Building Community in London.

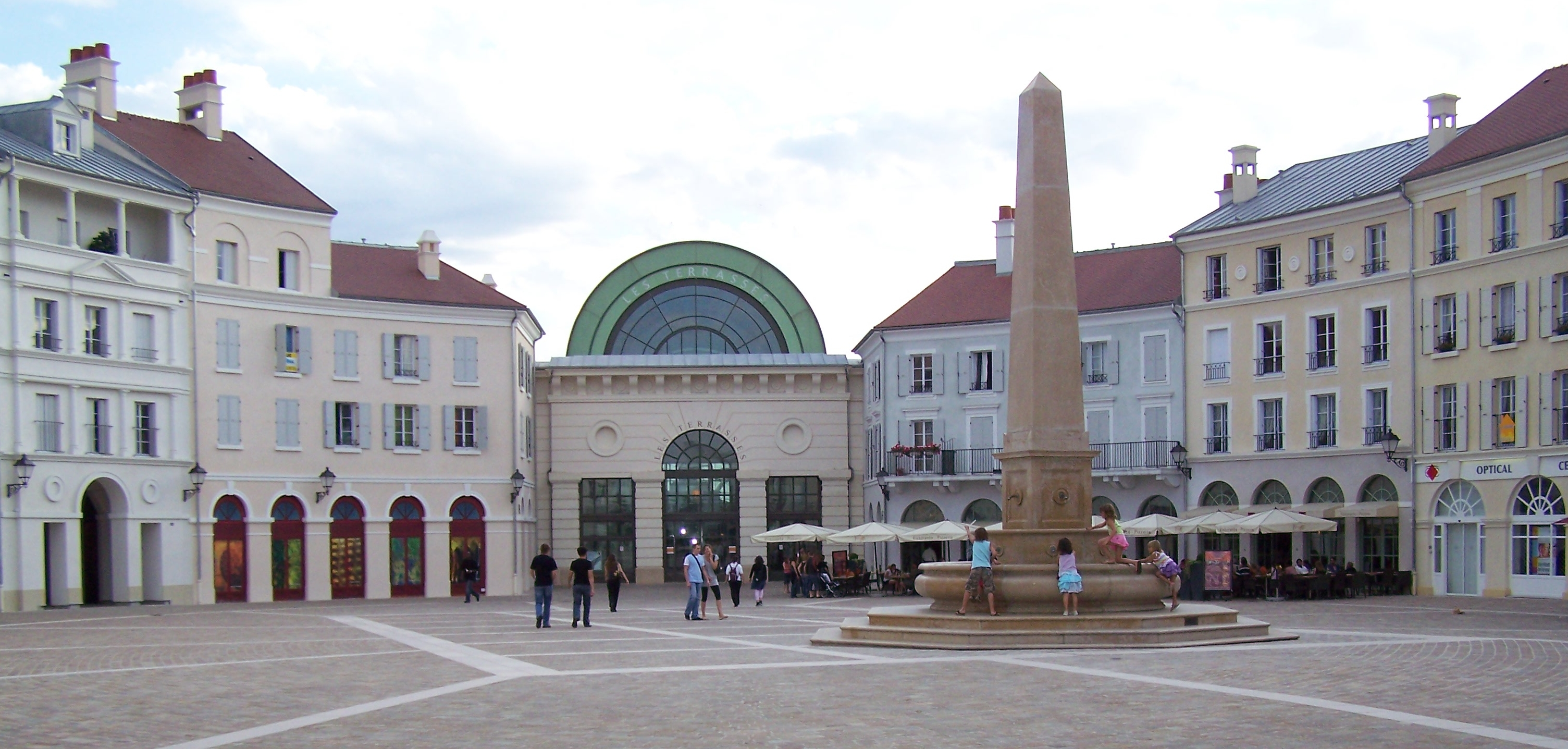
Place de Toscane in Serris, Val d'Europe, France, designed in 2002

He collaborates with the architects Massimo Gandini, Giuseppe Greci, Fabio Paoletti, Matteo Casola, Nicola Bergamaschi and Maria Cristina Celato. Bontempi won the architectural competition for the recovery plan of urban blocks in the historic center of Parma (1981-1987). In the year 1996, Bontempi received his second award at the international Marsham Street Urban Design Competition in London. He was also awarded the Prix Européen de la Reconstruction de la Ville in 1998, by the Fondation Philippe Rotthier pour l'Architecture de Bruxelles in Brussels.

In 2000, Bontempi was the John Burgee Annual Lecturer at the Notre Dame School of Architecture, USA. In June 2001, the architect received a Charter Award at the Congress for the New Urbanism's annual conference ("CNU IX", New York). In 2002, he won the competition for the building of Place de Toscane in Val d'Europe, a project which has won the 2008 Palladio Award in Boston, USA. In 2014, Bontempi was awarded the international Driehaus Architecture Prize for "a career of achievement in the art of traditional architecture". The prize is awarded to "a living architect whose work embodies the highest ideals of traditional and classical architecture in contemporary society, and creates a positive cultural, environmental and artistic impact".
