= Villeneuve-Saint-Denis =

- Commune
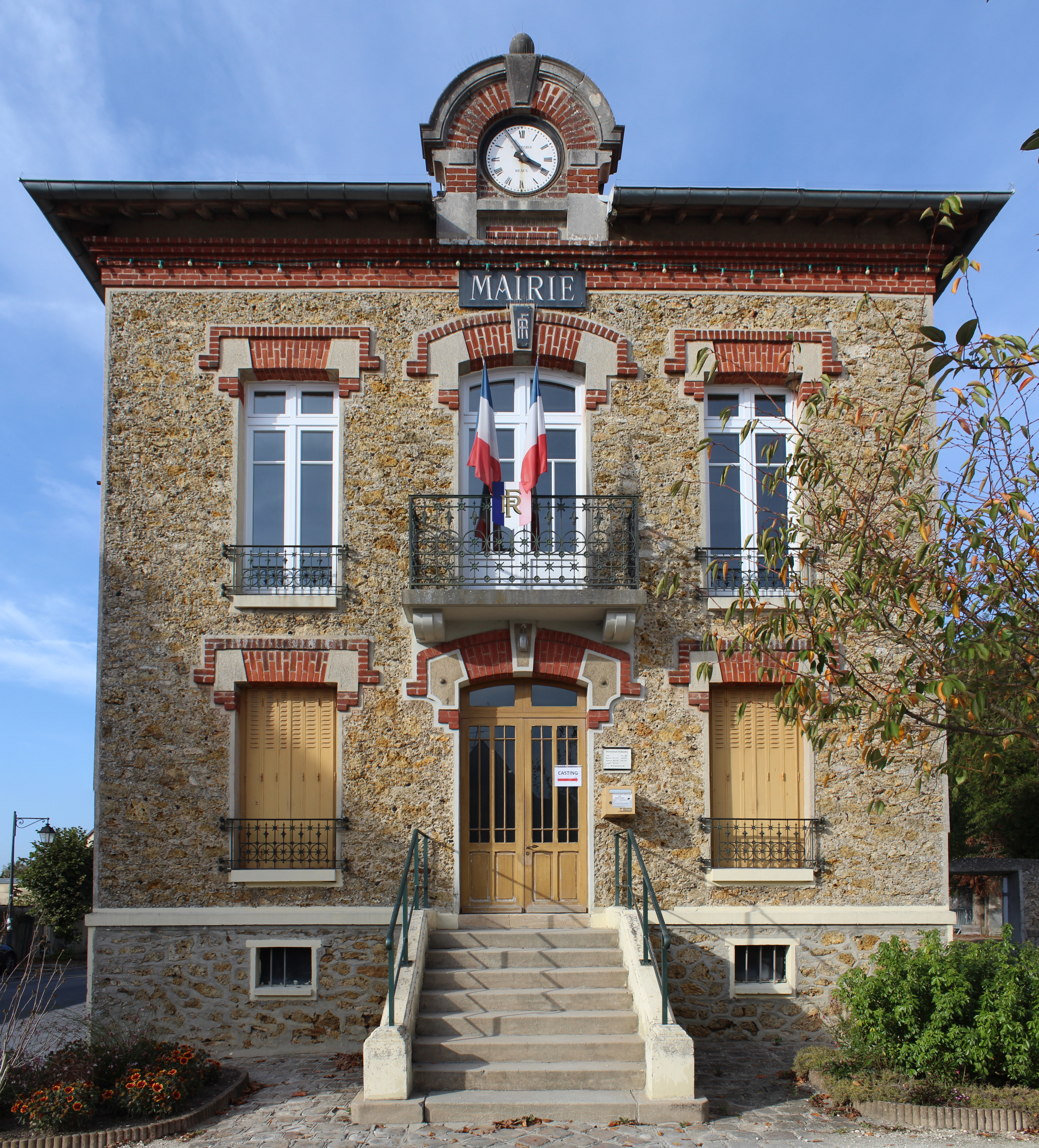
- The town hall in Villeneuve-Saint-Denis

- Coat of arms
- Location of Villeneuve-Saint-Denis
- Location within France Location within Île-de-France (region)
- Coordinates: 48°48′55″N 2°47′39″E
- Country: France
- Region: Île-de-France
- Department: Seine-et-Marne
- Arrondissement: Torcy
- Canton: Ozoir-la-Ferrière
- Intercommunality: Val d'Europe Agglomération

Government
  - Mayor (2020–2026): Peggy Pharisien
- Area^{1}: 7.40 km^{2} (2.86 sq mi)
- Highest elevation: 131 m (430 ft)
- Lowest elevation: 116 m (381 ft)
- Population (2023): 1,369
  - Density: 185/km^{2} (479/sq mi)
- Time zone: UTC+01:00 (CET)
  - Summer (DST): UTC+02:00 (CEST)
- INSEE/Postal code: 77510 /77174
- ^{1} French Land Register data, which excludes lakes, ponds, glaciers > 1 km^{2} (0.386 sq mi or 247 acres) and river estuaries.

Villeneuve-Saint-Denis (French: [vilnœv sɛ̃ dəni]) is a commune in the Seine-et-Marne department in the Île-de-France region in north-central France.

== Demographics ==
Inhabitants of Villeneuve-Saint-Denis are called Vildyonisiens.

== See also ==
- Communes of the Seine-et-Marne department
