= Val d'Europe Agglomération =

Coordinates: 48.88°N 2.77°E

- Communauté d'agglomération
- Country: France
- Region: Île-de-France
- Department: Seine-et-Marne
- No. of communes: {{{nbcomm}}}
- Established: January 2016
- Area: 69.4 km^{2} (26.8 sq mi)
- Population (2018): 50,922
  - Density: 734/km^{2} (1,900/sq mi)

Val d'Europe Agglomération (French pronunciation: [val døʁɔp aɡlɔmeʁasjɔ̃]) is a communauté d'agglomération in the Seine-et-Marne département and in the Île-de-France région of France. It was created on 1 January 2016 from the former syndicat d'agglomération nouvelle (SAN) du Val d'Europe. It was expanded with two communes in January 2018, and with three communes from the former communauté de communes du Pays Créçois in January 2020. Its seat is in Chessy. Its area is 69.4 km^{2}. Its population was 50,922 in 2018.

== Composition ==
It consists of 10 communes:

1. Bailly-Romainvilliers
2. Chessy
3. Coupvray
4. Esbly
5. Magny-le-Hongre
6. Montry
7. Saint-Germain-sur-Morin
8. Serris
9. Villeneuve-le-Comte
10. Villeneuve-Saint-Denis
