= Coupvray =

- Commune
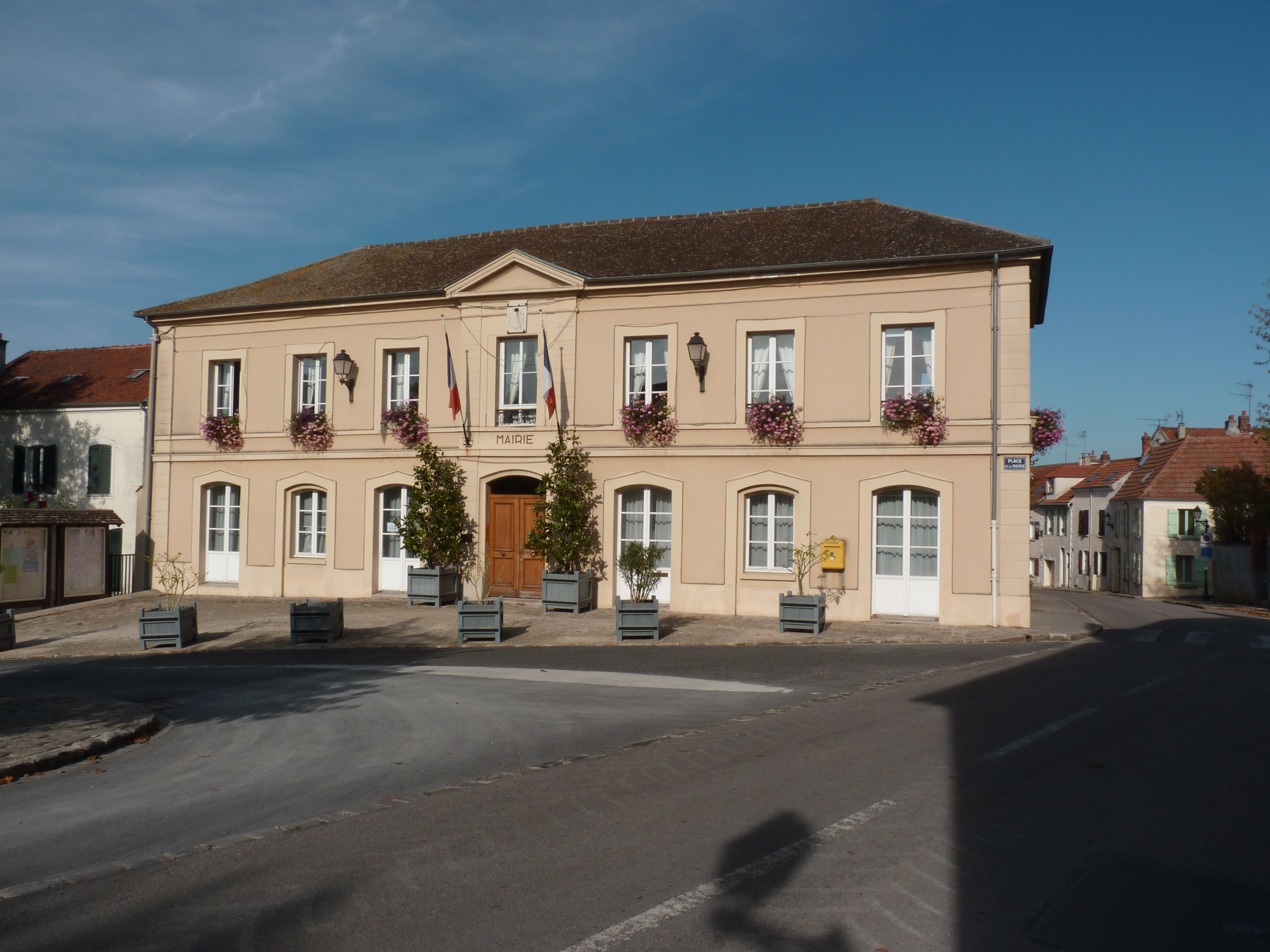
- The town hall in Coupvray
- Location of Coupvray
- Location within France Location within Île-de-France (region)
- Coordinates: 48°53′33″N 2°47′38″E
- Country: France
- Region: Île-de-France
- Department: Seine-et-Marne
- Arrondissement: Torcy
- Canton: Serris
- Intercommunality: Val d'Europe Agglomération

Government
  - Mayor (2020–2026): Thierry Cerri
- Area^{1}: 8.09 km^{2} (3.12 sq mi)
- Highest elevation: 132 m (433 ft)
- Lowest elevation: 41 m (135 ft)
- Population (2023): 3,066
  - Density: 379/km^{2} (982/sq mi)
- Time zone: UTC+01:00 (CET)
  - Summer (DST): UTC+02:00 (CEST)
- INSEE/Postal code: 77132 /77700
- ^{1} French Land Register data, which excludes lakes, ponds, glaciers > 1 km^{2} (0.386 sq mi or 247 acres) and river estuaries.

Coupvray (French: [kuvʁɛ]) is a commune in the Seine-et-Marne department in the Île-de-France region in north-central France about 30kms east of Paris.

== People ==
Coupvray was the birthplace and home of Louis Braille, which is now a museum. His hands are buried in Coupvray as a symbol of Louis’ system of touch reading; the rest of his body is buried in the Panthéon, Paris.

== Points of interest ==
The Castle of Rohan, built over the period 1596–1602 by Hercule de Rohan, Duke of Montbazon, is another visitor attraction, although it is now mostly in ruins. Disneyland Resort Paris is also nearby.

== Demographics ==
Inhabitants of Coupvray are known as Cupressiens in French.

Historical population

Year	Pop.	±% p.a.
1793	588	—
1800	681	+2.12%
1806	629	−1.32%
1821	612	−0.18%
1831	616	+0.07%
1836	572	−1.47%
1841	543	−1.04%
1846	575	+1.15%
1851	566	−0.32%
1856	512	−1.99%
1861	499	−0.51%
1866	480	−0.77%
1872	463	−0.60%
1876	452	−0.60%
1881	456	+0.18%
1886	513	+2.38%
1891	503	−0.39%
1896	513	+0.39%
1901	519	+0.23%

Year	Pop.	±% p.a.
1906	505	−0.55%
1911	516	+0.43%
1921	507	−0.18%
1926	582	+2.80%
1931	521	−2.19%
1936	695	+5.93%
1946	658	−0.55%
1954	707	+0.90%
1962	680	−0.49%
1968	769	+2.07%
1975	1,063	+4.73%
1982	1,416	+4.18%
1990	2,280	+6.14%
1999	2,713	+1.95%
2007	2,790	+0.35%
2012	2,607	−1.35%
2017	2,864	+1.90%
2023	3,066	+1.14%

Source: EHESS and INSEE (1968-2023)

== Education ==
The commune has the Groupe scolaire Francis et Odette Teisseyre, a school group including one preschool and one elementary school. The collège (junior high school) Etablissement Louis Braille in Esbly serves Coupvray, and the assigned senior high school is the Lycée Pierre de Coubertin in Meaux.

== See also ==
- Communes of the Seine-et-Marne department
