= Lycée Émilie du Châtelet =

- High school of excellence in Catering & Hotel management

Location
- 35 Cours du Danube; 77700 Serris; France
- Coordinates: 48°51′25″N 2°46′43″E

Information
- Other name: Lycée d'excellence des métiers de l'Hôtellerie & de la Restauration
- Former name: Lycée Hôtelier de Serris
- Type: State senior high school
- Established: June 2006 (in provisional site)
- Educational authority: Académie de Créteil (Regional Academic Council)
- Category: Polyvalent senior high school
- School code: 0772688D (RNE Code)
- Teaching staff: ~ 110
- Grades: Secondary education (General & Vocational); Higher education (BTS)
- Age range: 15~18 (Secondary) 18~20 (BTS)
- Enrollment: ~ 1,090 (2019)
- Capacity: ~ 1,200
- Average class size: ~ 35 (in general secondary classes)
- Education system: Day school & Boarding school
- Language: French
- Key products: Dishes & products from the training restaurant
- Website: www.lycee-edc.com; www.lycee-edc-hr.com

The Lycée Émilie du Châtelet is a state senior high school in Serris, Seine-et-Marne, France, in the Paris metropolitan area.

This educational establishment is named after Émilie du Châtelet, a French female scientist, especially a natural philosopher and a mathematician, during the first half of the 18th century. She is also known for having strongly argued for girl's education.

== Location ==
Located around 30 km (19 mi) to the east of Paris in the district of Val d'Europe (lit. Valley of Europe), the eastmost part of the new town of Marne-la-Vallée, this sixth-form college has seen its enrollments regularly increase with population growth supported by a strong local economic development through activities often linked to trade (with a local central business district and a large shopping centre) and tourism (with the Disneyland Paris entertainment resort and many leisure places nearby).

== Students ==
The Lycée Émilie du Châtelet welcomed its first students at the start of the 2006 school year in temporary premises near the current site which was inaugurated at the start of the 2010 school year.

Teaching is mainly provided in French and partially in English (standard British English) for the vocational and higher sections. At the same time, the languages (and related foreign civilizations) studied are English, German, Spanish, Italian and Korean. In addition, it is also possible to study Latin.

As of 2011, it had 685 students. Due to the diversity of the trainings offered and the different languages taught associated with the growth of the particularly young local population, the enrollments have continuously increased to reach 1,089 in 2019.

Evolution of the high school enrollment
School year	2009	2011	2015	2017	2019
Enrollment	324	685	891	951	1089

== Trainings provided ==
This establishment has a renowned teaching section specializing in hospitality industry and catering. The training curriculum includes periods of internship. A post-graduate diploma called BTS is issued at the end of studies if the training is validated. The favorable economic environment allows students to enter the workforce quickly and sustainably.

== See also ==
- Secondary education in France
- Education in France
