= Val d'Europe (mall) =

Shopping mall near the city centre of Paris, France

Coordinates: 48.8536°N 2.7807°E

Val d’Europe is a shopping mall located 30 minutes to the east of the city centre of Paris, the French capital and 5 minutes from the Disneyland Paris theme park and the Villages Nature holiday village.

Opened in 2000, the mall has 190 shops, 30 restaurants and an aquarium, covering over 93,000 square metres (1,000,000 sq ft) since its most recent expansion completed in March 2017.

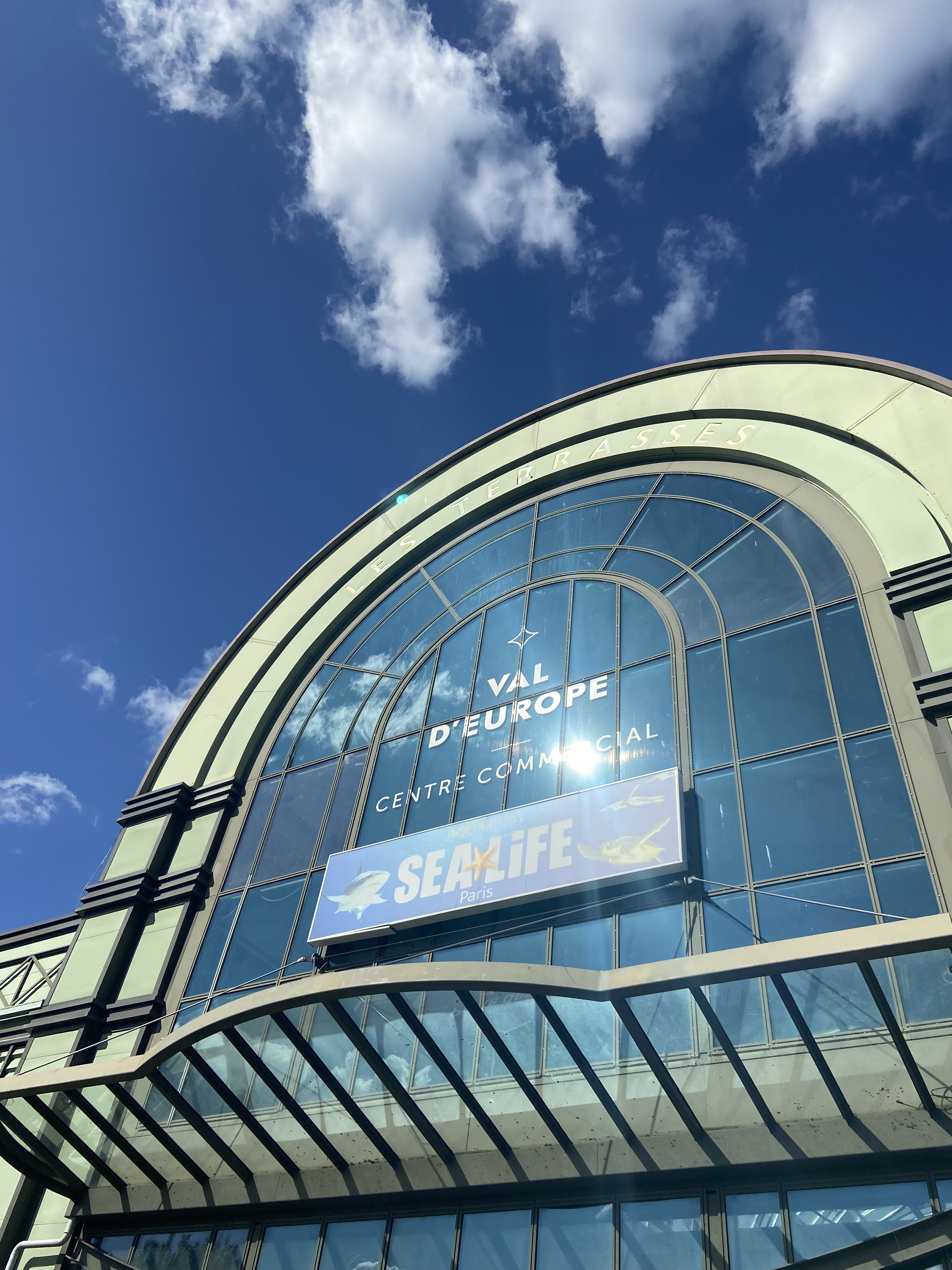
Outside of Val d’Europe shopping centre in 2025

== History ==
The beginnings of the mall can be traced to 1987 when 6 institutions – the state, the Île-de-France region, the Seine-et-Marne department, RATP Group, and government development companies: EPA Marne and EPA France – gave 1943 hectares to The Walt Disney Company, for the construction of an urban project near the pre-existing theme park.

The aim of this project was to re-balance the economic development of the Île-de-France region and the East of the Paris basin.

It was not until 1996 that agreements on the proposed development were signed between the land owners, EuroDisney CSA, and developers, Ségécé, for the creation of a large shopping mall.

Construction began in October 1998 and the mall was opened two years later, on 25 October 2000.

In 2002, Val d’Europe won an ICSC International European Shopping Centre PROCOS award in the New Developments: Large Centres category.

The mall has undergone numerous expansion projects, including one in 2003 for the opening of the Delbard garden centre, which won the ICSC International prize for Innovative Design and Construction, and an almost 1,000-square-metre (11,000 sq ft) extension of the “Les Terrasses” food court in 2006.

In 2010, EuroDisney passed the land to the Klépierre group.

The mall has been able to stay open on Sundays since 2016, when it gained the status of an “international tourist area” (ZTI in French), as Disneyland Paris was the first tourist attraction in Europe to have 15 million visitors per year.

In 2017, the mall underwent further renovation and expansion of over 16,000 square metres (170,000 sq ft) creating 30 new stores and 8 restaurants.

== Architecture ==
=== Design ===
The centre was designed and built by an international team: Graham Gund (USA), Chapman Taylor (Great Britain) and Lobjoy & Bouvier (France). They worked together on the project and drew their inspiration from 19th century Parisian architecture.

The resulting style drew freely from the three leading figures of the period: Gustave Eiffel, Victor Baltard, and Baron Georges Eugène Haussmann.

The mall was divided into four shopping areas:

- Les Halles, a covered market over two buildings, inspired by Baltard's glass and metal constructions, which boasted large glazed ceilings,
- Les Passages Parisiens, which was reminiscent of 19th century shopping arcades,
- La Promenade, inspired by the famous Gare d’Orsay railway station and Parisian boulevards. It included coffered ceilings that cascaded inwards and downwards and were visible from its large glass façade,
- Les Terrasses, with live vegetation and a fountain in a setting of glass and cast iron, gave an environment that changes throughout the year. Les Terrasses also houses the mall's restaurants and is first mall in France to be built as an American-style food court.

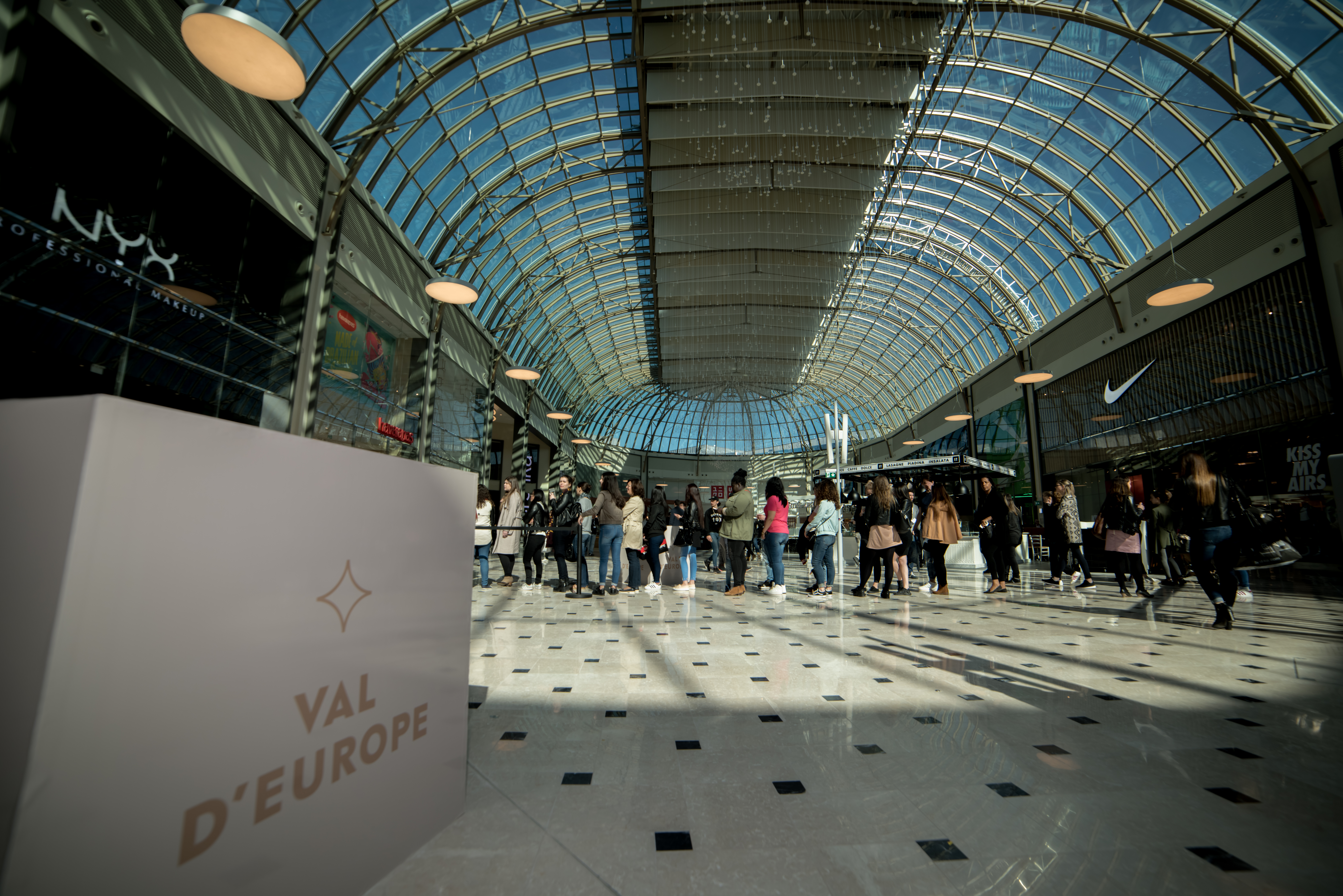
Val d'Europe architecture, inspired by Grand Palais

=== 2017 renovation ===
In 2017, renovations were carried out in a more contemporary style, drawing inspiration from the architecture of the Grand Palais.

Thanks to the 16,000-square-metre (170,000 sq ft) expansion, 30 new stores were opened, including a branch of the clothing retailer Primark, and a new restaurant hub was created. This new space accommodates 8 new restaurants. The largest OLED chandelier in Europe, measuring 65 m in length, is fitted with 6000 LED lamps and illuminates this space known as the Place des étoiles.

== Stores ==
The shopping centre has 190 shops, 30 restaurants, a 16,000-square-metre (170,000 sq ft) Auchan hypermarket and a Sealife aquarium.

Brands from all over the world have stores in Val d’Europe, including retailers in fashion, footwear, leather goods, jewellery, accessories and beauty products. There are also stores from retailers in food, culture and leisure, high-tech, homeware and decoration.

=== Restaurants ===
The mall houses a large American-style food court, with about 30 restaurants, as well as a smaller food court located in the new expansion, with 6 restaurants stands, covering a range of offerings from traditional French pâtisserie and baked goods to full restaurants, including snack outlets and ice-cream parlours. Traditional French cuisine is available, as well as food from Italy, Lebanon, Japan and the USA.

== Services ==
Services are available such as phone recharging stations, wifi, taxi booking, tax refunding. There are also family services (e.g. baby changing facilities, free pushchair hire, children area) and special on-demand services (e.g. personal shopper, cooking workshops).

== Events ==
Every year some events take place in the centre, such as the “Femmes en Or” celebration of innovation. In 2014, attendees to this week-long event were given a randomly-chosen box containing a shoe. If this shoe fitted their foot, they were given the pair.

In July 2016, Nickelodeon showed free children's animations.

Events take place in the mall every three days on average.

== Transportation ==
As the mall is located in the town of Serris, there is a direct train service to the store from Paris (line RER A), which stops at Val d’Europe station. The mall is also a 5-minute journey from Disneyland Paris (i.e. Marne-La-Vallée Chessy on line RER A) and a 10-minute journey from Marne La Vallée TGV station. It is accessible from Charles de Gaulle airport in Paris via the A4 motorway. There are 6,100 car parking spaces. Free shuttle buses link the shopping centre to Disneyland Paris.

== Sources ==
- https://www.challenges.fr/entreprise/le-top-10-des-centres-commerciaux-en-france_163496/slide_1
- http://www.lefigaro.fr/flash-eco/2012/11/08/97002-20121108FILWWW00433-disneyland12-millions-de-visiteurs-2012.php
- http://www.klepierre.com/centres/val-deurope/
- http://www.urbanisme-puca.gouv.fr/IMG/pdf/H-BELMESSOUS_Val_dEurope.pdf
- http://www.studiolentigo.net/?p=3973
- http://www.capital.fr/bourse/communiques/klepierre-le-centre-commercial-val-d-europe-celebre-10-ans-de-succes
- http://www.leparisien.fr/serris-77700/serris-amir-electrise-la-place-des-etoiles-du-centre-commercial-du-val-d-europe-26-04-2017-6892398.php
