= Serris, Seine-et-Marne =

Serris
- Commune
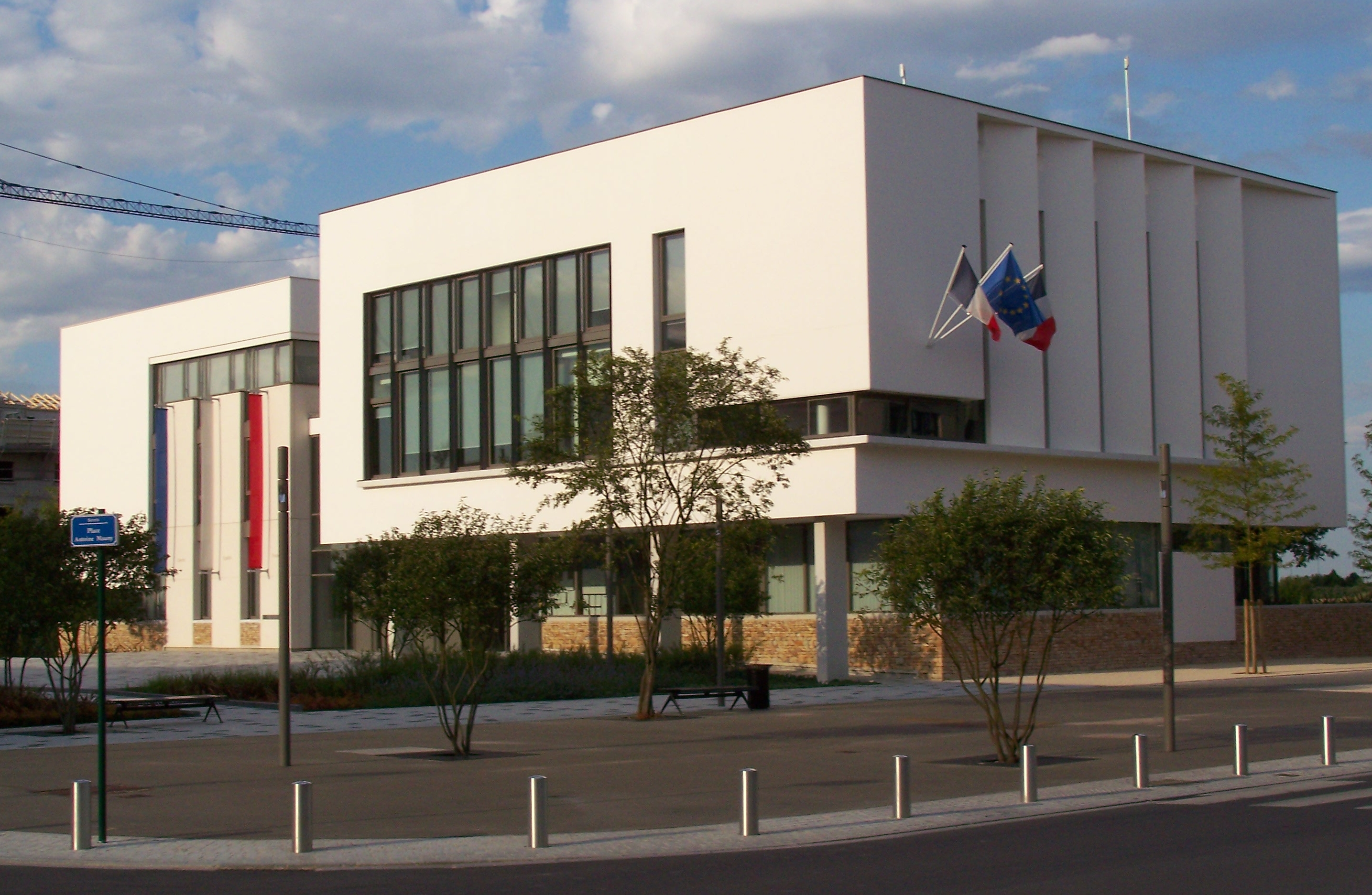
- The town hall in Serris
- Location of Serris
- Location within France Location within Île-de-France (region)
- Coordinates: 48°50′44″N 2°47′16″E
- Country: France
- Region: Île-de-France
- Department: Seine-et-Marne
- Arrondissement: Torcy
- Canton: Serris
- Intercommunality: Val d'Europe Agglomération

Government
  - Mayor (2020–2026): Philippe Descrouet
- Area^{1}: 5.65 km^{2} (2.18 sq mi)
- Highest elevation: 133 m (436 ft)
- Lowest elevation: 123 m (404 ft)
- Population (2023): 10,326
  - Density: 1,830/km^{2} (4,730/sq mi)
- Time zone: UTC+01:00 (CET)
  - Summer (DST): UTC+02:00 (CEST)
- INSEE/Postal code: 77449 /77700
- ^{1} French Land Register data, which excludes lakes, ponds, glaciers > 1 km^{2} (0.386 sq mi or 247 acres) and river estuaries.

Serris (French pronunciation: [sɛʁis]) is a commune in the Seine-et-Marne department in the Île-de-France region in north-central France. The area has an outlet mall known as La Vallée Village.

== Demographics ==
Inhabitants of Serris are called Serrissiens in French.

Historical population
Year	Pop.	±% p.a.
1968	232	—
1975	304	+3.94%
1982	422	+4.80%
1990	898	+9.90%
1999	2,320	+11.12%
2007	6,592	+13.94%
2012	8,117	+4.25%
2017	9,040	+2.18%
2023	10,326	+2.24%
Source: INSEE

== Education ==
The commune has four primary school groups (combined preschool and elementary schools): Robert Doisneau (opened in 1999), Jules Verne (opened in 2001), Jean de la Fontaine (opened in 1992), and Henri Matisse (opened in 2004).

Collège Madeleine Renaud, a junior high school in Serris, opened in 2005. Lycée Émilie du Châtelet, the senior high school, opened in 2010.

University of Marne-la-Vallée provides university education in the area. As of 2016 1,300 of its students resided in Serris.

== See also ==
- Communes of the Seine-et-Marne department
