= Baton =

Baton may refer to:

== Stick-like objects ==
- Baton, a type of club
  - Baton (law enforcement)
  - Baston (weapon), a type of baton used in Arnis and Filipino Martial Arts
  - Baton charge, a coordinated tactic for dispersing crowds of people
- Baton (conducting), a short thin stick used for directing a musical performance
- Baton (military), a symbolic attribute of military or other office
- Baton (running), an object transferred by runners in a relay race
- Baton sinister, a mark of cadency in heraldry
- Baton twirling, a gymnastic sport that uses hand-held sticks
- Baton, a smaller version of a baguette
- Baton, in stick juggling, the central stick, which is manipulated with the side-sticks (control sticks)
- Baton, another word for a batonette, a culinary knife cut
- Batons, in the keyboard of a carillon, the stick-like keys used to play the bells
- Batons (suit) in Latin-style card decks, including tarot
  - Suit of wands in tarot cartomancy

== People ==
- Baton (mythology), a mythological charioteer of ancient Greece
- Baton of Sinope, 3rd-century BCE historian
- Baton of Athens, 3rd-century BCE comic poet

== Other uses ==
- BATON, a Type 1 block cipher, used by the United States to secure all types of classified information
- Baton (2009 film), a Japanese animated science fiction film by Ryuhei Kitamura
- Baton (2026 film), an American sports drama film by Danny Ramirez
- Baton Bob, a costumed street performer currently based in Atlanta, Georgia
- Baton Broadcasting, a Canadian broadcaster that is the predecessor to present-day Bell Media
- Baton Broadcasting System, a defunct television system owned by Baton Broadcasting Inc.
- Baton Bunny, a Bugs Bunny cartoon of the Looney Tunes series produced in 1958
- BATON Overlay or Balanced Tree Over-lay Network, a distributed tree structure for Peer-to-Peer (P2P) systems
- Baton Records, a record label
- Baton River, a river in the Tasman District of New Zealand

== See also ==
- Baton Rouge (disambiguation)
- Batton, a surname
- Bato (Illyrian name), a name sometimes rendered in ancient Greek as "Baton"
- Batten (disambiguation)
- Batong (disambiguation)
- Batoni (disambiguation)
