= Beton =

Beton may refer to:

- Beton, a type of concrete
- Beton (typeface)
- Beton, a Czech drink containing Becherovka and tonic
- Jean-Claude Beton (1925–2013), Algerian-French businessman
- Concrete (novel) (original name Beton), a 1982 novel by Berthod
- "Beton", a song by C418 from the album Excursions

== See also ==
- Bethon, a commune in northeastern France
- Béthon, a commune in northwestern France
- Beton-Bazoches, a commune in France
- Marchais-Beton, a former commune in France
- Béton brut, architectural surface made of concrete
- Baton (disambiguation)
