= Pommeuse =

- Commune
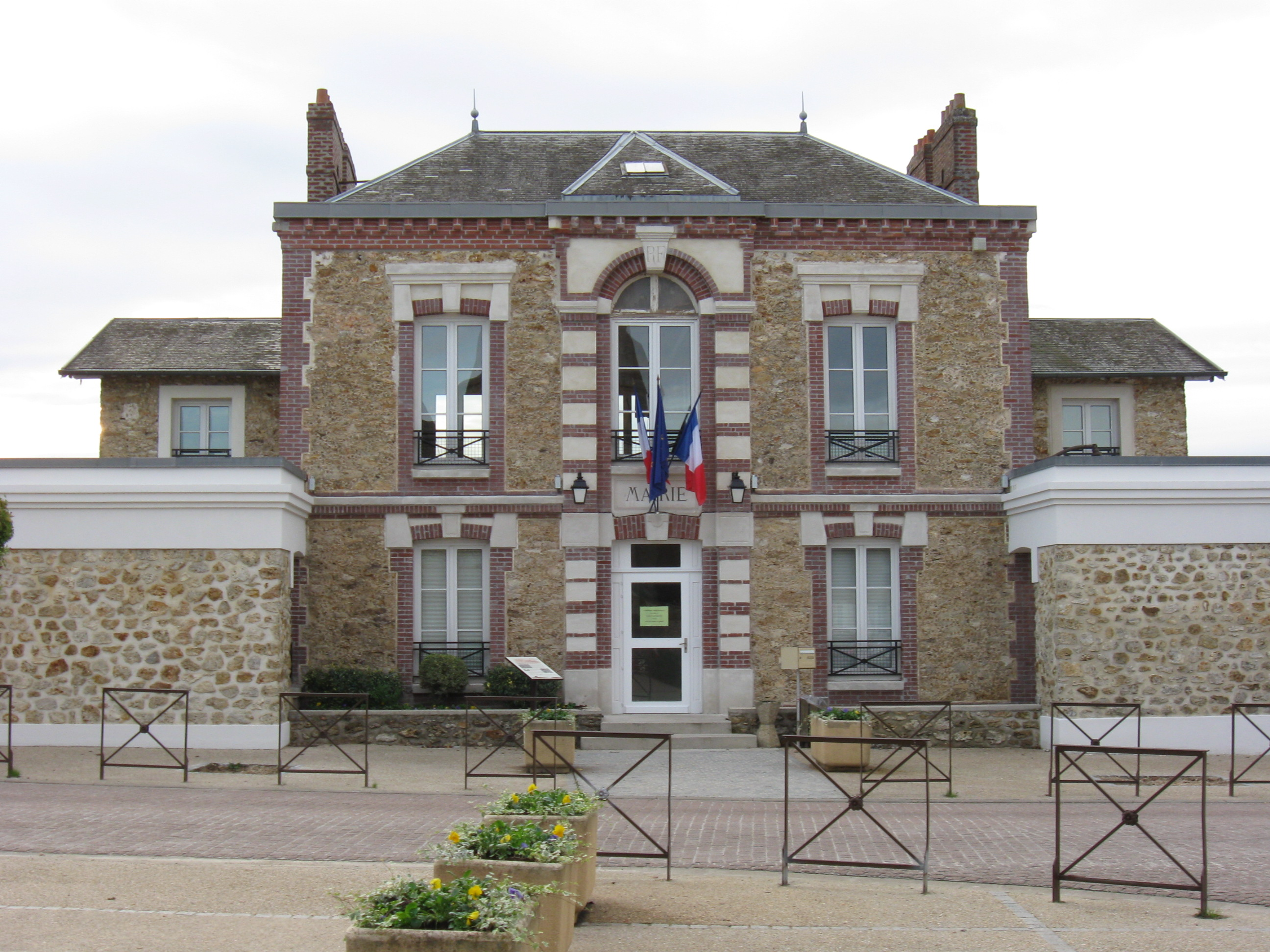
- The town hall in Pommeuse

- Coat of arms
- Location of Pommeuse
- Location within France Location within Île-de-France (region)
- Coordinates: 48°49′02″N 3°01′02″E
- Country: France
- Region: Île-de-France
- Department: Seine-et-Marne
- Arrondissement: Meaux
- Canton: Fontenay-Trésigny
- Intercommunality: CA Coulommiers Pays de Brie

Government
  - Mayor (2020–2026): Christophe De Clerck
- Area^{1}: 12.80 km^{2} (4.94 sq mi)
- Highest elevation: 146 m (479 ft)
- Lowest elevation: 55 m (180 ft)
- Population (2023): 3,049
  - Density: 238.2/km^{2} (616.9/sq mi)
- Time zone: UTC+01:00 (CET)
  - Summer (DST): UTC+02:00 (CEST)
- INSEE/Postal code: 77371 /77515
- ^{1} French Land Register data, which excludes lakes, ponds, glaciers > 1 km^{2} (0.386 sq mi or 247 acres) and river estuaries.

Pommeuse (French pronunciation: [pɔmøz]) is a commune in the Seine-et-Marne department in the Île-de-France region in north-central France.

== Geography ==
Pommeuse is located in the valley of the Grand Morin and on the northern bank of the afore-mentioned valley. Two rivers flow through the commune: the Grand Morin and the Aubetin.

The largest part of the commune is occupied by agricultural land, dedicated to the growth of cereals (mainly corn and wheat), and the farming of cattle. Part of the commune is wooded, notably along the banks of the Grand Morin and on the bank of the valley. A railway line links Pommeuse to Paris in 56 minutes and also reaches out to the town of Coulommiers.

== Neighboring communes ==
The neighboring communes are :

- Faremoutiers
- Mouroux
- La Celle-sur-Morin
- Saint-Augustin

== History ==
The word "Pommeuse" signifies bridge over the Morin. The commune was previously named Eboriac and was at the junction of two Roman highways.

The Pommeuse fief was created in 1144.
There were four successive castles or manors. The first dates back to the 11th century, and allowed the lord to perceive a tax from the people wanting to cross the Morin. This castle was located on a mound overlooking the feodal land. The second castle was surrounded by a mote fed by the Morin, and was severely damaged during the Hundred Years' War. The third castle build around 1480 was based upon a Renaissance type model. It was destroyed during the revolution and its occupants (the De Langlois family) guillotined. The fourth castle still inhabited to this day, was built from 1825 to 1830. It was upon recently still occupied by the De Langlois family.

== Administration ==
List of mayors
Term	Name
2001–2014	Jacques Alonso
2014–2020	Joël Duceillier
2020–incumbent	Christophe De Clerck

== Demography ==
The population has doubled in 30 years, as it did in a large part of the east of the Paris area. Its inhabitants are called Pommeusiens in French.

Historical population
Year	Pop.	±% p.a.
1968	1,317	—
1975	1,370	+0.57%
1982	1,518	+1.48%
1990	1,808	+2.21%
1999	2,476	+3.56%
2007	2,674	+0.97%
2012	2,835	+1.18%
2017	2,925	+0.63%
2023	3,049	+0.69%
Source: INSEE

== Religious heritage ==
The commune is host to a twelfth-century church, and a more recent chapel. Pommeuse and the neighbouring village of Faremoutiers are united in one parish, itself part of the diocese of Meaux.

The abbot Jean Perrin (born 1912) has been the parish priest for 50 years. Mass has however only very rarely been celebrated in Pommeuse in the past few years because of the age of the priest.

== Economy ==
A Pechiney factory used to exist by the Grand Morin, but was closed down, as a result Pommeuse is virtually devoid of industry. Economic activity is limited to:

- agricultural activity
- a chemists
- a bread shop
- a grocers
- a paper shop
- a hairdressers
- a play school and an elementary school

== Places of interest ==
- Faremoutiers and Pommeuse train station.
- Pommeuse church
- four watermills
- monument for the commemoration of the dead of the World Wars
- the Pommeuse Castle.

== See also ==
- Communes of the Seine-et-Marne department
