= List of shipwrecks in December 1880 =

Shipwrecks

The list of shipwrecks in December 1880 includes ships sunk, foundered, grounded, or otherwise lost during December 1880.

== 1 December ==
List of shipwrecks: 1 December 1880
Ship	State	Description
Catherine and Helen	United Kingdom	The schooner was driven ashore at Thurso, Caithness. Her six crew were rescued by the Thurso Lifeboat. She was on a voyage from Bangor, Caernarfonshire to Peterhead, Aberdeenshire.
Daniel	United Kingdom	The brigantine ran aground and was wrecked at Port Talbot, Glamorgan. She was on a voyage from Bilbao, Spain to Port Talbot.
Franklin	United Kingdom	The ship ran aground on the Courland Bank, off Queenstown, County Cork. She was refloated and put back.
Jane Butcher	United Kingdom	The schooner struck a rock and sank off Holm Island. She was on a voyage from Kingston, Jamaica to Middlesbrough, Yorkshire.
Josefina	Sweden	The brig ran aground and sprang a leak at Egersund, Norway. She was on a voyage from Hållsta to Newcastle upon Tyne, Northumberland, United Kingdom.
Lietch	Norway	The brig was run into by the steamship Storm Queen (United Kingdom) off Nash Point, Glamorgan and was severely damaged. Leitch was on a voyage from Cardiff, Glamorgan to Veracruz, Mexico.
Louise Henri	France	The ship struck a sunken wreck in the North Sea 30 nautical miles (56 km) off Flamborough Head, East Riding of Yorkshire and was damaged. She was on a voyage from Newcastle upon Tyne to Catania, Sicily, Italy. She out in to Whitby, Yorkshire in a leaky condition.
Marie	Germany	The steamship ran aground at Falsterbo, Sweden. She was on a voyage from Riga, Russia to London, United Kingdom. She was refloated and takne in to Copenhagen, Denmark.
Marion	(United Kingdom of Great Britain and Ireland) Isle of Man	The schooner was wrecked on the Burbo Bank, in Liverpool Bay. Her crew were rescued.
Pilen	Norway	The schooner was wrecked at Egersund with the loss of all hands. She was on a voyage from Kragerø to Wick, Caithness, United Kingdom.
Progress	United Kingdom	The ship struck rocks off Peterhead, Aberdeenshire. She was on a voyage from Cromarty to Goole, Yorkshire. She put in to Aberdeen in a leaky condition.
Vesper	United Kingdom	The ship struck wreckage and foundered in the Bristol Channel off the coast of Devon. Her crew survived.
Vincedore	Norway	The barque was abandoned in the Atlantic Ocean (49°22′N 17°42′W). Her crew were rescued by the Zeeland (Netherlands). Vincedore was on a voyage from Dalhousie, New Brunswick, Canada to Liverpool, Lancashire, United Kingdom.
Cape Cod Lifeboat	United States Life-Saving Service	The lifeboat capsized off Cape Cod, Massachusetts with the loss of three of her crew.
Unnamed	United States	The sloop was driven ashore at Cape Cod. Her crew were rescued by the Cape Cod Lifeboat.

== 2 December ==
List of shipwrecks: 2 December 1880
Ship	State	Description
Anglesea	United Kingdom	The ship departed from the Mobile Bay for a British port. No further trace, reported missing.
Constance	United Kingdom	The schooner sank at Cherbourg, Manche. She was on a voyage from Newcastle upon Tyne, Northumberland, United Kingdom to Carentan, Manche.
Hea	Norway	The barque caught fire at Nordenham, Germany. She was on a voyage from Philadelphia, Pennsylvania, United States to Bremen, Germany.
Louise Elizabeth	United Kingdom	The schooner was driven ashore at Cromer, Norfolk.
Release	United Kingdom	The fishing smack ran aground on the Newcombe Sand, in the North Sea off the coast of Norfolk. She was refloated with the assistance of the tug Rainbow (United Kingdom).
Unnamed	Belgium	The barge was run down and sunk in the Scheldt by the steamship Alster(United Kingdom) with the loss of her captain.

== 3 December ==
List of shipwrecks: 3 December 1880
Ship	State	Description
Cairngorm	United Kingdom	The ship was driven ashore at Peterhead, Aberdeenshire. She was refloated.
Georges Anger	France	The barque was abandoned in the Atlantic Ocean with the loss of all but five of her crew. Survivors were rescued by Lockett (United Kingdom). Georges Anger was on a voyage from Martinique to Havre de Grâce, Seine-Inférieure, France.
Jeune Marie	France	The ship was driven ashore on Île Vesique, Morbihan and sank. Her crew were rescued.
Latoan	United Kingdom	The ship struck the Cole Rock. She was on a voyage from Maceió, Brazil to Liverpool, Lancashire. She completed her voyage in a severely leaky condition.
Philemon	France	The barque caught fire at Havre de Grâce and was scuttled.
Quarryman	United Kingdom	The schooner ran ashore in the Sound of Islay. She was refloated on 5 November.
Rodell Bay	United Kingdom	The barque departed from San Francisco, California, United States for Queenstown, County Cork, and was not heard of again. Lost with all 21 hands.
Unnamed	United Kingdom	The steamship ran aground on the Salisbury Bank, in Liverpool Bay.
Unnamed	United Kingdom	The brig was driven ashore on Nosy Be, Madagascar. She was on a voyage from the Persian Gulf to Port Elizabeth, Cape Colony.

== 4 December ==
List of shipwrecks: 4 December 1880
Ship	State	Description
Aislaby	United Kingdom	The steamship ran aground in the Danube at Gorgova, United Principalities.
Alfrida	Spain	The ship was driven ashore and wrecked at "Frangisvaag", Faroe Islands.
Arrival	United Kingdom	The schooner ran aground on the Cutler Sand, in the North Sea off the coast of Suffolk. She was refloated with the assistance of the smack Dawn (United Kingdom) and taken in to Southwold in a leaky condition. Her captain committed suicide. Arrival was on a voyage from London to Goole, Yorkshire.
Ceres	United Kingdom	The sloop was driven ashore and wrecked on the Anstead Rocks, off North Sunderland, Northumberland. Her crew survived. She was on a voyage from Eyemouth, Berwickshire to South Shields, County Durham.
Charles Pauline	France	The schooner was driven ashore and wrecked at Lemvig, Denmark. She was on a voyage from Cherbourg, Seine-Inférieure to Dram, Norway.
Glencairn	United Kingdom	The ship was wrecked on the Oosterbank, in the North Sea off the coast of Zeeland, Netherlands. Her crew were rescued. She was on a voyage from Newcastle upon Tyne, Northumberland to Rotterdam, South Holland, Netherlands.
Isabella Maclean	United Kingdom	The ship departed from Cuxhaven, Germany for Aberdeen. No further trace, reported overdue.
Ivanhoe	Russia	The barque was wrecked on the Morant Cays, Jamaica. Her crew were rescued. She was on a voyage from Saint-Nazaire, Ille-et-Vilaine to Ship Island, Mississippi, United States.
Sappho	United Kingdom	The steamship was damaged by fire at Antwerp, Belgium.

== 5 December ==
List of shipwrecks: 5 December 1880
Ship	State	Description
Camille	France	The barque was run into by the steamship St. Oswin (United Kingdom) and sank in the North Sea off the mouth of the Humber with the loss of one of her eight crew. Survivors were rescued by St. Oswin. Camille was on a voyage from Caen, Calvados to Blyth, Northumberland, United Kingdom.
Cornwall and Emerald	United Kingdom	The steamship Emerald ran aground at Sunderland, County Durham and was run into by the steamship Cornwall, which also ran aground. Both vessels were refloated. Emerald was on a voyage from Havre de Grâce, Seine-Inférieure, France to Sunderland.
Fresia	Chilean Navy	War of the Pacific: The torpedo boat was sunk at Callao, Peru by shore based artillery.
Gaetano S.	Italy	The full-rigged ship was driven ashore on Terschelling, Friesland. She was on a voyage from Akyab, Burma to Bremen, Germany. She subsequently became a wreck.
Galatea	United Kingdom	The barque collided with the steamship Edendale (United Kingdom) and sank 10 nautical miles (19 km) north west of Trevose Head, Cornwall. Her twelve crew were rescued by Edendale. Galatea was on a voyage from Swansea, Glamorgan to Port Nolloth, Cape Colony.

== 6 December ==
List of shipwrecks: 6 December 1880
Ship	State	Description
Alarm	United Kingdom	The ship was driven ashore at Cliffe, Kent. She was refloated.
Algonquin	United Kingdom	The ship ran aground at Carrigaloe, County Cork. She was on a voyage from Queenstone to Cork. She was refloated.
Ane Ellen	Denmark	The ship departed from King's Lynn, Norfolk, United Kingdom for Copenhagen. No further trace, reported hopelessly overdue.
Argosy	United Kingdom	The schooner was driven ashore at Barra Grande, Brazil. She was on a voyage from Rio de Janeiro, Brazil to New York, United States. She was a total loss.
Aurora	United Kingdom	The barque was driven ashore at Riga, Russia. Her crew were rescued. She was on a voyage from Boston, Massachusetts, United States to Riga.
Blumenthal	United Kingdom	The brig was wrecked at "Millerraggan". Her crew were rescued. She was on a voyage from Memel to Southampton, Hampshire, United Kingdom.
Coringa	United States	The barque was wrecked on the coast of Pattangi, Siam with the loss of three of her crew.
Fresia	Chilean Navy	War of the Pacific: The torpedo boat was sunk off Callao, Peru. She was refloated.
Galatea	United Kingdom	The barque was run down by the steamship Edendale (United Kingdom) and sank in the Atlantic Ocean 10 nautical miles (19 km) north by west of Trevose Head, Cornwall. Her crew were rescued by Edendale. Galatea was on a voyage from Swansea, Glamorgan to Cape Town, Cape Colony.
Milton	United Kingdom	The brigantine was wrecked at Bahia, Brazil. She was on a voyage from Aracaju, Brazil to the English Channel.
Princess	United Kingdom	The steamship was run into by the steamship Walsgrif (United Kingdom) in the Prince's Channel and was severely damaged.
Providence	United Kingdom	The fishing smack was run into by the schooner Heimdal (Norway) off the Silverpits, in the North Sea, and was severely damaged. She put in to Great Yarmouth, Norfolk in a severely leaky condition on 10 December.
Thales	United Kingdom	The steamship ran aground in the Scheldt. She was on a voyage from the River Plate to Antwerp, Belgium.

== 7 December ==
List of shipwrecks: 7 December 1880
Ship	State	Description
Alice	United Kingdom	The ketch was driven ashore at Newtown, Isle of Wight. She was on a voyage from Goole, Yorkshire to Exmouth, Devon. She was refloated and towed in to West Cowes, Isle of Wight in a leaky condition.
Express	United Kingdom	The ship was run into by Epaminondas (United Kingdom) and sank at Ayr.
Gazelle	Netherlands	The ship ran aground on the Dragor Sands, in the Baltic Sea. She was on a voyage from Riga, Russia to Amsterdam, North Holland. She was refloated and resumed her voyage.
Glenfalloch	United Kingdom	The ship ran aground in the River Duddon. She was on a voyage from Boston, Massachusetts, United States to Maryport, Cumberland. She was refloated and taken in to Maryport in a leaky condition.
Grangemouth	United Kingdom	The steamship ran aground at Leith, Lothian. She was on a voyage from Grangemouth, Stirlingshire to Leith. She was refloated.
Sovereign	United Kingdom	The ship ran aground at Wexford. She was on a voyage from Saint John, New Brunswick, Dominio of Canada to Wexford. She was refloated the next day with the assistance of a tug.

== 8 December ==
List of shipwrecks: 8 December 1880
Ship	State	Description
Beata	United Kingdom	The tug sank at North Shields, Northumberland. She was refloated on 11 December and beached.
Blue Bell	United Kingdom	The fishing lugger collided with the smack Golden Harp and was severely damaged. She put back to Lowestoft, Suffolk.
Colorado	United Kingdom	The barque was driven ashore on Holy Isle, in the Firth of Clyde. She was on a voyage from Liverpool, Lancashire to Saint John's, Newfoundland Colony. She was refloated and taken in to Lamlash, Isle of Arran.
Dolphin	United Kingdom	The ship ran aground on the Sangevoog, in the North Sea. Her crew were rescued. She was on a voyage from an English port to Brake, Germany.
Isabella	United Kingdom	The ship was run into by the schooner Betsy (United Kingdom) off Happisburgh, Norfolk and was severely damaged. Isabella was on a voyage from Hull, Yorkshire to London. She was towed in to Great Yarmouth, Norfolk.
Margarethe	Denmark	The hoy departed from Hull for Copenhagen. No further trace, reported overdue.
Minnie Knapp	United Kingdom	The brig was driven ashore at Longrock, County Down. She was on a voyage from Belfast, County Antrim to Newport, Monmouthshire. She was refloated on 9 December and towed in to Belfast.
Resta	United Kingdom	The tug sank at North Shields, Northumberland.
Zulu	United Kingdom	The steamship struck the pier at Dover, Kent and sprang a leak. She consequently ran aground.

== 9 December ==
List of shipwrecks: 9 December 1880
Ship	State	Description
Aios Nicolaos	Greece	The brig ran aground on the Tehardak Shoal, in the Dardanelles. She was on a voyage from Taganrog, Russia to Marseille, Bouches-du-Rhône, France.
Amcott	United Kingdom	The steamship ran aground at Middlesbrough, Yorkshire.
Clutha	United Kingdom	The steamship collided with the steamship Tay (United Kingdom) off the mouth of the River Carron and was beached. Clutha was on a voyage from Middlesbrough to Grangemouth, Stirlingshire. She was refloated and taken in to Grangemouth.
Fanchon	Canada	The ship was abandoned in the Atlantic Ocean. Her twelve crew were rescued by L. G. Bigelow (United States). Fanchon was on a voyage from Charleston, South Carolina, United States to Cette, Hérault, France.
Garnet	United Kingdom	The steamship departed from Burntisland, Fife for Flensburg, Germany. Presumed foundered with the loss of all seventeen crew; a boat from the ship was discovered in the North Sea by the steamship Concurrent (Germany) on 14 December. Garnet may have foundered on 12 December.
Gwalior	United Kingdom	The barque ran aground at Kastrup, Denmark. She was on a voyage from Sandarne, Sweden to Stockton-on-Tees, County Durham. She was refloated and resumed her voyage.
John Elden	Sweden	The schooner was driven ashore on Skagen, Denmark and was abandoned by her crew. She was on a voyage from Newcastle upon Tyne, Northumberland, United Kingdom to Helsingør, Denmark.
Summer Cloud	United Kingdom	The ship ran aground on the Burnhoarie Bank, in the Firth of Forth. She was on a voyage from a port in New Brunswick, Canada to Dundee, Forfarshire.
Vivienne	United Kingdom	The steamship ran aground at Maassluis, South Holland, Netherlands. She was on a voyage from Bilbao, Spain to Rotterdam, South Holland. She was refloated the next day.

== 10 December ==
List of shipwrecks: 10 December 1880
Ship	State	Description
Alpha	Netherlands	The ship was driven ashore and wrecked in the Gulf of Riga. Her crew were rescued.
Bella Tumelty	United Kingdom	The brigantine ran aground on "Las Rocques". She was on a voyage from Cardiff, Glamorgan to "Tucasas". She broke up the next day with the loss of her captain.
Defiance	United Kingdom	The schooner ran aground at Irvine, Ayrshire. She was on a voyage from Donaghadee, County Down to Irvine.
Else Katrine	Norway	The ship struck the wreck of Osnabruck (Flag unknown) in the River Teifi and ran aground. She was on a voyage from Sundsvall, Sweden to Cardigan, United Kingdom. She was refloated and taken in to Cardigan in a severely damaged condition.
Fremad	Norway	The brig was driven ashore and wrecked at Lemvig, Denmark. Her crew were rescued.
Hermod	Denmark	The ship departed from the River Tyne for Fredericia. No further trace, reported missing.
Jacobus	Russia	The full-rigged ship was towed in to Karlskrona, Sweden in a waterlogged condition. She was on a voyage from Pori, Grand Duchy of Finland to Lübeck, Germany.
Johanna	Germany	The galiot was driven ashore and wrecked in the Emshörn Channel. Her crew were rescued. She was on a voyage from Danzig to Leer. She was refloated in June 1881 and taken in to Thisted, Denmark for repairs. She arrived on 19 June.
Katrine	Denmark	The schooner was driven ashore at Lemvig. Her crew were rescued. She was on a voyage from Hull, Yorkshire, United Kingdom to Copenhagen.
Leven	France	The brigantine foundered in the Atlantic Ocean. Her crew were rescued by Sofia (Italy).
Marquis of Lorne	(Dominion of Newfoundland) Newfoundland Colony	The barque ran aground at Havre de Grâce, Seine-Inférieure, France and was damaged. She was on a voyage from Baltimore, Maryland, United States to Havre de Grâce.
Nonatum	United Kingdom	The barque was wrecked on the coast of the Newfoundland Colony with the loss of fifteen of her seventeen crew. She was on a voyage from Miramichi, New Brunswick, Canada to London and/or Gibraltar.
Phœnician	(United Kingdom of Great Britain and Ireland) Isle of Man	The schooner was abandoned off Thurso, Caithness. Her crew were rescued by the Thurso Lifeboat.
Regina Cœli	France	The ship sank in a cyclone at Réunion with the loss of twenty of her 24 crew.
Sarah Margaret	United Kingdom	The brig was driven ashore at Whitby, Yorkshire. Her crew were rescued.
Sylphide	Norway	The barque was driven ashore and wrecked at Lemvig with the loss of her captain from her eight crew. She was on a voyage from Grimsby, Lincolnshire, United Kingdom to Gothenburg, Sweden.
Three Sisters	United Kingdom	The Thames barge was run into by the steamship Resolute (United Kingdom) and sank in the River Thames at Gravesend.
Valencia	United Kingdom	The steamship ran ashore at Cortadura, Spain. She was on a voyage from Glasgow, Renfrewshire to Barcelona, Spain. She was refloated and resumed her voyage.
Unnamed	Flag unknown	The ship was abandoned off Thurso. Her crew were rescued by the Thurso Lifeboat.

== 11 December ==
List of shipwrecks: 11 December 1880
Ship	State	Description
Annie Cecilie	Denmark	The schooner was driven ashore. She was refloated in June 1881 and taken in to Thisted, where she arrived on 19 June.
Azorean	United States	The barque was driven ashore on Faial Island, Azores with the loss of a crew member.
Glendevon	United Kingdom	The steamship ran aground at Newcastle upon Tyne, Northumberland. She was on a voyage from Newcastle upon Tyne to Genoa, Italy. She was refloated and resumed her voyage.

== 12 December ==
List of shipwrecks: 12 December 1880
Ship	State	Description
Courier	Germany	The barque was driven ashore and wrecked at Thisted, Denmark. She was on a voyage from Vyborg, Grand Duchy of Finland to Grimsby, Lincolnshire, United Kingdom.
Emmanuel	United Kingdom	The brig was driven ashore and wrecked on Læsø.
Isabel	United States of Colombia	The steamship suffered a boiler explosion and sank in the Magdalena River with the loss of twelve lives and many injured. She was on a voyage from Barranquilla to Bogotá or vice versa.
Julie Heyn	Germany	The barque was driven ashore and wrecked at Thisted.
Marie Louise	Norway	The ship was wrecked at Gothenburg, Sweden. Her crew were rescued.
Nordpolen	Norway	The ship was abandoned off the Horn Reef. She was on a voyage from Lisbon, Portugal to Kristiansand.
Quorn	United Kingdom	The barque, which had previously sprang a leak, was beached at Magilligan, County Londonderry. Her eighteen crew were rescued by rocket apparatus. She was on a voyage from Greenock, Renfrewshire to New Orleans, Louisiana, United States. She subsequently became a wreck.
Sleipner	Norway	The schooner was driven ashore and wrecked at Thisted. She was on a voyage from Libava, Courland Governorate to Schiedam, South Holland, Netherlands.
Vindosala	United Kingdom	The steamship ran aground at New York. She was refloated.
Volgia	Norway	The ship foundered in the Baltic Sea.
Weser	Denmark	The barque was driven ashore at Thisted. Her crew were rescued by rocket apparatus. She was a total loss.

== 13 December ==
List of shipwrecks: 13 December 1880
Ship	State	Description
Bravo	Norway	The barque was abandoned east of the Dogger Bank. Her crew were rescued by the smack Minnie (United Kingdom and another smack. Bravo was on a voyage from Dartmouth, Devon, United Kingdom to Dram.
Colonist	Norway	The barque was driven ashore at Lemvig, Denmark. Her crew were rescued. She was on a voyage from London, United Kingdom to Christiania.
Gros Turbot	France	The sloop collided with the steamship Marie (France) and sank at Dunkirk, Nord with the loss of two of her crew. Gros Turbot was on a voyage from London to Havre de Grâce, Seine-Inférieure.
Gyda	Norway	The barque was driven ashore at Lemvig. Her crew were rescued. She was on a voyage from Rouen, Seine-Inférieure to Arendal.
Howick	United Kingdom	The ship was driven ashore at Fredrikshavn, Denmark. She was on a voyage from Königsberg, Germany to London. She was refloated with assistance from a number of steamships.
Leeds	United Kingdom	The steamship struck the pier at Maassluis, South Holland, Netherlands and was wrecked. All on board were rescued. She was on a voyage from Grimsby, Lincolnshire to Rotterdam, South Holland.
Margaretha Hendrika	Netherlands	The galiot was wrecked on the Randzel Bank, in the North Sea off the German coast with the loss of all but one of her crew. She was on a voyage from Newcastle upon Tyne, Northumberland, United Kingdom to Groningen.
Ondine	Belgium	The ship was abandoned at sea. Her crew were rescued. She was on a voyage from Kristiansand, Denmark to Ostend, West Flanders.
Pallas	United Kingdom	The brigantine ran aground on the Brambles, in the Solent. She was on a voyage from Newcastle upon Tyne to Plymouth, Devon. She was refloated and taken in to Cowes, Isle of Wight.
Pallas	United Kingdom	The barque was driven ashore at Lemvig. Her crew were rescued. She was on a voyage fvrom London to Christiania.
Ranzani	Italy	The steamship was driven ashore at Venice. She was on a voyage from Newport, Monmouthshire, United Kingdom to Venice. She was refloated.
Walereren	Netherlands	The ship ran aground in the Nieuw Diep. She was on a voyage from Riga, Russia to the Nieuw Diep.
Unnamed	Flag unknown	The ship was wrecked near Cheticamp, Cape Breton Island, Nova Scotia, Canada with the loss of 22 lives.

== 14 December ==
List of shipwrecks: 14 December 1880
Ship	State	Description
Catharina Elizabeth	Netherlands	The brig was abandoned at sea.
Cyclone	United Kingdom	The schooner collided with the schooner Pioneer in the Dogger Bank and sank.
Embro	Flag unknown	The ship sank near "Vallona". She was on a voyage from Bayonne, Basses-Pyrénées, France to Trieste.
Frigate Bird	Norway	The barque was wrecked on the Goodwin Sands, Kent, United Kingdom. Her crew were rescued by the tug Daring (United Kingdom). Frigate Bird was on a voyage from Dieppe, Seine-Inférieure, France to Kristiansand.
Hartlepool	United Kingdom	The steamship struck the pier at Dover, Kent and was severely damaged.
Lorely	United States	The ship ran aground in the Weser. She was on a voyage from Philadelphia, Pennsylvania to Hamburg, Germany. She was refloated and taken in to Hamburg.
Matrona	Denmark	The abandoned schooner drove ashore on Sylt, Germany.
P. C. Petersen	Norway	The barque ran aground at Fort-Liberté, Haiti. She was refloated and put back to Fort-Liberté.
Presto	Flag unknown	The ship was lost in the North Sea. Her crew were rescued. She was on a voyage from Danzig, Germany to Dunkirk, Nord, France.
Unnamed	United Kingdom	The barge was run into by the steamship Apollo (United Kingdom) and sank in the River Thames.

== 15 December ==
List of shipwrecks: 15 December 1880
Ship	State	Description
Eblana	United Kingdom	The ship ran aground in Liverpool Bay. She was on a voyage from Calcutta, India to Liverpool, Lancashire. She was refloated with assistance from three tugs and towed in to Liverpool.
Hakon Adelstein	Norway	The steamship ran aground at "Russoer" and sprang a leak.
Lady Mary	United Kingdom	The brigantine was driven ashore and wrecked at Whiting Bay, Isle of Arran. Her crew were rescued. She was on a voyage from Irvine, Ayrshire to Belfast, County Antrim.
St. Pierre Justine	France	The sloop was driven ashore at Dunkirk, Nord. She was on a voyage from Havre de Grâce, Seine-Inférieure to Antwerp, Belgium.
Ten Brothers	United Kingdom	The schooner was driven ashore at Cushendall, County Antrim.
Unnamed	Germany	The lighter sprang a leak at Bremen and was beached.

== 16 December ==
List of shipwrecks: 16 December 1880
Ship	State	Description
Andriane	Netherlands	The barque ran aground on the Dragor Sand, in the Baltic Sea. She was on a voyage from Härnösand, Sweden to Hartlepool, County Durham, United Kingdom.
Carl	Sweden	The brig was driven ashore and wrecked at Lemvig, Denmark. She was on a voyage from Gävle to Newcastle upon Tyne, Northumberland, United Kingdom.
Claverhouse	United Kingdom	The steamship ran ashore at Cooktown, Queensland. She was on a voyage from Fuzhou, China to Brisbane, Queensland. She was refloated on 18 December and resumed her voyage.
Contest	(United Kingdom of Great Britain and Ireland) Guernsey	The brig ran aground off the French coast and was wrecked. Her nine crew took to a boat; they were rescued by the steamship Isla (United Kingdom). Contest was on a voyage from South Shields, County Durham to Plymouth, Devon. She subsequently floated off and was taken in to Shoreham-by-Sea, Sussex in a waterlogged condition by a Belgian pilot cutter.
Dagny	Norway	The barque was driven ashore and wrecked at Lemvig. Three of her crew were rescued; her captain drowned. She was on a voyage from London, United Kingdom to Christiania.
Florence Richards	United Kingdom	The steamship was damaged by fire at Newport, Monmouthshire.
John N. Gamewill	United States	The brigantine was destroyed by fire in Algoa Bay. She was on a voyage from Bombay, India to London.
Learmouth	Flag unknown	The steamship ran aground at Honfleur, Manche, France. She was on a voyage from Charleston, South Carolina, United States to Sevastopol, Russia.
Maggie Cross	United Kingdom	The brigantine was driven ashore and wrecked near Port Charlotte, Islay. She was on a voyage from Greenock, Renfrewshire to Tralee, County Kerry.
Margarethe	Germany	The schooner was driven ashore at Lemvig. She was on a voyage from Gothenburg, Sweden to Gloucester, United Kingdom.
Saint	United Kingdom	The schooner sprang a leak and was beached at Yarmouth, Isle of Wight. She was on a voyage from Middlesbrough, Yorkshire to Cardiff, Glamorgan. The leak was repaired and she was refloated.
Sophie Kromann	Germany	The ship was driven ashore at Lemvig. She was on a voyage from Königsberg to Sunderland, County Durham, United Kingdom.
Via	United Kingdom	The smack was abandoned in the North Sea 90 nautical miles (170 km) East by North of Spurn Point, Yorkshire. Her crew were rescued by the smack Apennine (United Kingdom), which towed Via in to Hull, Yorkshire.

== 17 December ==
List of shipwrecks: 17 December 1880
Ship	State	Description
Charles Bal	United States	The ship ran aground at Emshorn, Germany. She was on a voyage from New York to Emden, Germany.
Charlotte Young	United Kingdom	The barque ran aground at Hayle, Cornwall. She was on a voyage from Hayle to Boston, Massachusetts and/or Philadelphia, Pennsylvania, United States.
Margarethe Hendrika	Netherlands	The ship was wrecked on the Randgal Bank, in the North Sea. Her crew were rescued. She was on a voyage from Newcastle upon Tyne, Northumberland to Groningen, Netherlands.
Roecliff	United Kingdom	The ship struck the Owers Sandbank, in the English Channel off the coast of Sussex. She was on a voyage from Sunderland, County Durham to Southampton, Hampshire. She put in to Littlehampton, Sussex in a leaky condition.

== 18 December ==
List of shipwrecks: 18 December 1880
Ship	State	Description
Anglo-Dane	United Kingdom	The steamship ran aground on the Bredegrund, in the Baltic Sea. She was on a voyage from Hull, Yorkshire to Libava, Courland Governorate. She put in to Malmö, Sweden with a damaged propeller.
Bee	United Kingdom	The brig departed from Sunderland, County Durham for Aberdeen. No further trace, presumed foundered with the loss of all hands.
Belle	United Kingdom	The ship ran aground at the entrance to the Larne Lough. She was refloated and resumed her voyage.
Blink Bonnie	United Kingdom	The ship was abandoned at sea. Her crew were rescued. She was on a voyage from Maryport, Cumberland to Londonderry.
Pretoria	United Kingdom	The steamship was driven ashore and damaged near Oskarshamn, Sweden. She was refloated on 22 December and towed in to Oskarshamn.

== 19 December ==
List of shipwrecks: 19 December 1880
Ship	State	Description
Cassowary	United Kingdom	The schooner was driven ashore at Aberdeen. Her crew were rescued. She was on a voyage from the River Tyne to Kirkwall, Orkney Islands.
Clio	Sweden	The brig ran aground and was wrecked at Ardrossan, Ayrshire, United Kingdom. Her eight crew were rescued by the Ardrossan Lifeboat Fair Maid of Perth ( Royal National Lifeboat Institution).
Diamond	United Kingdom	The brigantine was driven against the breakwater at Ardrossan and was severely damaged.
Duen	Norway	The barque ran aground in North Bay. She was on a voyage from Troon, Ayrshire to Cienfuegos, Cuba. She was refloated and put back to Troon in a severely leaky condition.
Elizabeth Ann, and Lydia	United Kingdom; Norway	Elizabeth Ann was driven ashore at Portrush, County Antrim. She was driven into by the barque Lydia, which also went ashore. Both vessels were severely damaged. Both were refloated; Lydia was found to be leaky.
Fay	United Kingdom	The schooner ran ashore at Teignmouth, Devon. She was refloated the next day.
Garland	United Kingdom	The smack ran aground on the Hollywood Bank, in the Belfast Lough.
Gwen Jones	United Kingdom	The schooner was driven ashore and wrecked on Gigha, Inner Hebrides. Her crew survived. She was on a voyage from Barmouth, Merionethshire to Aberdeen.
Liberty	United Kingdom	The ship was driven ashore near Kilroot, County Antrim.
Malmo	United Kingdom	The sloop foundered in the North Sea off Beadnell, Northumberland. Her crew were rescued by the tug Flying Scotsman (United Kingdom). Malmo was on a voyage from the River Tyne to Eyemouth, Berwickshire.
Nancy Lee	United Kingdom	The ship sank at Liverpool, Lancashire.
Walrus	United Kingdom	The sloop foundered off Beadnell, Northumberland. Her crew were rescued by Flying Scotchman (United Kingdom). Walrus was on a voyage from the River Tyne to Eyemouth.
Warkworth Castle	United Kingdom	The brig ran aground on the Boudicar Rock, off the coast of Northumberland. Her crew were rescued by the Amble Lifeboat.Warkworth Castle was on a voyage from Gloucester to Amble, Northumberland. She was later refloated and towed in to Amble.
William Hill	United Kingdom	The brig was wrecked at Ayr with the loss of two of her five crew. Survivors were rescued by the Ayr Lifeboat The Glasgow Workmen ( Royal National Lifeboat Institution). William Hill was on a voyage from Drogheda, County Louth to Ayr.
Unnamed	Italy	The ship foundered off Coverack, Cornwall, United Kingdom with the loss of all hands.

== 20 December ==
List of shipwrecks: 20 December 1880
Ship	State	Description
Anna Dora	United Kingdom	The schooner was wrecked off Whalsay, Shetland Islands. Her crew were rescued. She was on a voyage from Grimsby, Lincolnshire to Iceland.
Derwent	United Kingdom	The brig was driven ashore and wrecked on Holy Isle, in the Firth of Clyde. Her crew were rescued. She was on a voyage from Maryport, Cumberland to Londonderry.
Ellida	France	The ship was driven ashore at Lyngør, Norway. She was on a voyage from Pärnau, Russia to Dunkirk, Nord.
Envoy	United Kingdom	The steamship struck a sunken rock and foundered in the English Channel 2 nautical miles (3.7 km) north west of Barfleur, Manche, France with the loss of seven of her 26 crew. Six of the survivors were rescued by the lugger Perseverant (France). Envoy was on a voyage from Sunderland, County Durham to Rochefort, Charente-Inférieure, France.
Goshawk	United Kingdom	The barque was driven ashore and wrecked at Lowland Point, Cornwall. Her 22 crew took to the lifeboats; they landed at Gorran Haven. She was on a voyage from Dundee, Forfarshire to New Orleans, Louisiana, United States.
Janet and Mary	United Kingdom	The lighter foundered off Souter Point, Northumberland. Both crew were rescued by a tug. She was being towed from Middlesbrough to Newcastle upon Tyne, Northumberland.
Jedderen	Norway	The barque ran aground on the Middelgrunden, in the Baltic Sea. She was on a voyage from Memel, Germany to Newcastle upon Tyne. She was refloated with assistance and taken in to Copenhagen, Denmark.
John Clarck	Germany	The brig ran aground on the Middelgrunden. She was on a voyage from Memel to London, United Kingdom. She was refloated and resumed her voyage.
Julian	(United Kingdom of Great Britain and Ireland) Isle of Man	The ship sprang a leak and was abandoned in Luce Bay. She was subsequently taken in to Dromore, County Down.
Lumley Castle	United Kingdom	The steamship was wrecked off the Horns Reef, in the Baltic Sea. Her crew survived. She was on a voyage from New Orleans, Louisiana, United States to Reval, Russia.
Makrine	Norway	The barque was abandoned in the North Sea. Her crew were rescued by the schooner Maria (Denmark). Makrine was on a voyage from Christiania to Honfleur, Manche France.
Messenger	United Kingdom	The schooner was driven ashore and wrecked near the Hook Lighthouse, County Wexford. Her crew were rescued. She was on a voyage from Newport, Monmouthshire to Cork.
Salisbury	(Dominion of Newfoundland) Newfoundland Colony	The brigantine was driven ashore at Troon, Ayrshire, United Kingdom. She was on a voyage from Dundalk, County Louth to Troon. She was refloated on 17 January 1881 and taken in to Troon.
Three unnamed vessels	Switzerland	The vessels foundered in Lake Zurich with the loss of five lives.

== 21 December ==
List of shipwrecks: 21 December 1880
Ship	State	Description
Ada	United Kingdom	The barque was driven ashore at Blakeney, Norfolk. She was on a voyage from Hull, Yorkshire to Dunkirk, Nord, France
Alfretha	United Kingdom	The brigantine was driven ashore in Loch Indaal. She was on a voyage from Ardrossan, Ayrshire to Limerick. She was refloated.
John and Anne	United Kingdom	The smack foundered in the Irish Sea off Cemaes, Anglesey .
Liddesdale	United Kingdom	The steamship was driven ashore at "Rivah", Ottoman Empire. She was on a voyage from Sulina, United Principalities to Constantinople, Ottoman Empire.
Marie	Denmark	The barque ran aground on the Goodwin Sands, Kent, United Kingdom. She was on a voyage from Antwerp, Belgium to Yokohama, Japan. She was refloated with assistance from the lugger Champion (United Kingdom) and towed in to Dover, Kent.
Ploen	Norway	The barque was driven ashore "on Tomfruland". Her crew were rescued.

== 22 December ==
List of shipwrecks: 22 December 1880
Ship	State	Description
America	France	The steamship was driven ashore at Barletta, Italy.
Elena C.	Austria-Hungary	The brig was driven ashore at Barletta.
Grace Rome	United Kingdom	The schooner was driven ashore on the Carr Rock, off the coast of Lothian. Her four crew survived. She was on a voyage from Invergordon, Ross-shire to Leith, Lothian.
Hecka	Netherlands	The steamship ran aground at Finkenwerder, Germany. She was on a voyage from Amsterdam, North Holland to Hamburg, Germany.
H. P.	France	The schooner was driven ashore at Spittal Point, Northumberland. She was on a voyage from Dunkirk, Nord to Berwick upon Tweed. She was refloated with the assistance of a tug and taken in to Berwick upon Tweed.
Langley	United Kingdom	The steamship ran aground at Sunderland, County Durham. She was on a voyage from Sunderland to London. She was refloated with the assistance of a tug and resumed her voyage.
Madonna della Libera	Italy	The schooner was driven ashore at Barletta.
Thabor	Japan	The steamship was driven ashore and wrecked near Nagasaki. She was on a voyage from Kumamoto to Nagasaki.

== 23 December ==
List of shipwrecks: 23 December 1880
Ship	State	Description
Grace	United Kingdom	The schooner was wrecked on Fife Ness. Her crew survived. She was on a voyage from Invergordon, Ross-shire to Leith, Lothian.
Linda	United Kingdom	The smack was driven ashore at Kilkeel, County Down.
Margarethe	Germany	The schooner foundered in the North Sea 8 nautical miles (15 km) off Lømstrup, Denmark. Her crew survived. She was on a voyage from Middlesbrough, Yorkshire, United Kingdom to Stettin.
Montgomeryshire	United Kingdom	The steamship departed from Cardiff, Glamorgan for Singapore, Straits Settlements. No further trace, reported missing.
Spey	United Kingdom	The steamship was driven ashore and wrecked at Fife Ness. All thirteen people on board survived. She was on a voyage from Dundee, Forfarshire to Burntisland, Fife.
Union	United Kingdom	The brig departed from the River Tyne for Christiania, Norway. No further trace, presumed foundered with the loss of all eight crew.

== 24 December ==
List of shipwrecks: 24 December 1880
Ship	State	Description
Catherine	United Kingdom	The schooner foundered off Holyhead, Anglesey with the loss of all hands.
George	United Kingdom	The ship was driven ashore and wrecked near "Gushage". Her crew were rescued. She was on a voyage from Sunderland, County Durham to Odense, Denmark.
James Stewart	United Kingdom	The brig foundered at sea. Her crew were rescued by the full-rigged ship W. E. Reard (United States). James Stewart was on a voyage from Cádiz, Spain to the Newfoundland Colony.
Minerva	Norway	The steamship ran aground near Christiania. She was on a voyage from Randers to Christiania. She was refloated.
Monica	United Kingdom	The collier, a steamship, collided with the steamship Longdale (United Kingdom) and sank in the River Thames at Northfleet, Kent.
Nelly G. Troop	United States	The full-rigged ship was wrecked on Ameland, Friesland, Netherlands with the loss of four of her nineteen crew. She was on a voyage from Baltimore, Maryland to Bremen, Germany.
Nicholaos	Greece	The brig ran aground in the Dardanelles. She was refloated but found to be leaky.
Rebecca	Norway	The barque ran aground on the Nord Sand. She was refloated with the assistance of two tugs and towed in to Cuxhaven, Germany.
Virginia	United Kingdom	The ship was wrecked at Yarmouth, Isle of Wight with the loss of all hands.

== 25 December ==
List of shipwrecks: 25 December 1880
Ship	State	Description
Barbara	United Kingdom	The schooner ran aground on the Haisborough Sands, in the North Sea off the coast of Norfolk. She was on a voyage from Newcastle upon Tyne, Northumberland to London. She was refloated and taken in to Great Yarmouth, Norfolk in a leaky condition.
Bergitha	Norway	The schooner was driven ashore on Öland, Sweden.
Bombay	Hong Kong	The steamship was destroyed by fire in the Yangtse.
David	Italy	The barque was driven ashore at Alexandria, Egypt. She was on a voyage from Berdianski, Russia to an English port.

== 26 December ==
List of shipwrecks: 26 December 1880
Ship	State	Description
USC&GS Baton Rouge	United States Coast and Geodetic Survey	The survey ship, a paddle steamer, sank in the Mississippi River. She was refloated and sold in 1881.
Brenda	Norway	The brig was wrecked at Minatitlán, Mexico.
Giuseppe	Italy	The barque collided with Oberon (United Kingdom) and foundered in the Atlantic Ocean 100 nautical miles (190 km) west of the Isles of Scilly, United Kingdom with the loss of a crew member. Survivors were rescued by Oberon. Giuseppe was on a voyage from Gravesend, Kent, United Kingdom to New York, United States.
Ino	Germany	The schooner was driven ashore on Amrum. She was on a voyage from the Angostura River to Hamburg.

== 27 December ==
List of shipwrecks: 27 December 1880
Ship	State	Description
Egyptian	United Kingdom	The steamship was damaged by fire at Liverpool, Lancashire.
Merapi	Netherlands	The steamship struck a rock in the Banda Sea off Timor Laut, Netherlands East Indies and was wrecked. Her crew were rescued.

== 28 December ==
List of shipwrecks: 28 December 1880
Ship	State	Description
Alida	Netherlands	The ship foundered in the North Sea 150 nautical miles (280 km) north east by east of Spurn Point, Yorkshire, United Kingdom. Her crew were rescued by the fishing smack Livingstone (United Kingdom). Alida was on a voyage from Randers, Norway to Leith, Lothian, United Kingdom.
Brilliant	United Kingdom	The steam sloop collided with Palm (United Kingdom) and sank. All on board were rescued by Palm. Brilliant was on a voyage from Sunderland, County Durham to Scarborough, Yorkshire.
Bristol City	United Kingdom	The steamship departed from New York, United States for Bristol, Gloucestershire. No further trace, reported overdue.
Mars	Netherlands	The steamship was driven ashore at Callantsoog, North Holland. She was on a voyage from Danzig, Germany to Amsterdam, North Holland. She was refloated with the assistance of a tug and taken in to IJmuiden, North Holland.
Montgomeryshire	United Kingdom	The steamship foundered in the Atlantic Ocean 9 nautical miles (17 km) north of Figueira da Foz, Portugal in late December with the loss of all 30 crew. She was on a voyage from Cardiff to Singapore, Straits Settlements. Wreckage found at Tocha, Portugal was thought to be from this vessel.

== 29 December ==
List of shipwrecks: 29 December 1880
Ship	State	Description
Acacia	United Kingdom	The brig was damaged by fire at Leith, Lothian. Her captain was severely wounded.
Bengairn	United Kingdom	The barque was driven ashore and severely damaged at Dungeness, Kent. Her crew were rescued by rocket apparatus. She was on a voyage from Dunkirk, Nord, France to Liverpool, Lancashire. She was refloated on 3 February 1881 and towed in to Dover, Kent by the tugs Granville and Palmerston (both United Kingdom).
Humber	United Kingdom	The steamship was driven ashore near Bergen, Norway.
Lena	United Kingdom	The steamship was driven ashore at Falsterbo, Sweden. She was refloated in January 1881 and taken in to Copenhagen, Denmark.
Richelieu	French Navy	The ironclad central battery ship caught fire in the harbor at Toulon, France, and was scuttled in 10.75 metres (35 ft 3 in) of water to prevent her ammunition magazine from exploding, capsizing almost 90 degrees to port as she sank. She was raised and repaired, and she was returned to service in October 1881.
Viceroy	United Kingdom	The steamship struck the Cabezos Rocks, off the coast of Spain, and sank with the loss of all hands. She was on a voyage from Newcastle upon Tyne, Northumberland to Gibraltar.
Waterford	United Kingdom	The schooner ran aground on the Middle Hook, in the Bristol Channel off the coast of Somerset.

== 30 December ==
List of shipwrecks: 30 December 1880
Ship	State	Description
Blossom	(United Kingdom of Great Britain and Ireland) Isle of Man	The fishing smack struck a sunken rock off Finnart Point, Argyllshire and sank. Her four crew survived.
Doctor Kneiss	Germany	The brig was driven ashore on Saltholmen, Denmark. She was on a voyage from Riga, Russia to Hartlepool, County Durham, United Kingdom.
Farnley	United Kingdom	The steamship was wrecked on the Horns Reef, off the coast of Jutland. She was on a voyage from Savannah, Georgia, United States to Reval, Russia. On 3 January 1881, two boats, one containing two bodies, and several bales of cotton washed up at Bjerregård, near Ringkøbing.
Hotspur	United Kingdom	The steamship sank off Tarifa, Spain with the loss of all hands. She was on a voyage from Newport, Monmouthshire to Naples, Italy.
King	United Kingdom	The schooner collided with an Austro-Hungarian barque and sank off Ramsgate, Kent with the loss of all but one of her crew. The survivor was rescued by a tug. King was on a voyage from Guernsey, Channel Islands to London.
Longfellow	United States	The barque ran aground in the Bristol Channel off the coast of Somerset, United Kingdom. She was on a voyage from New York to Sharpness, Gloucestershire, United Kingdom. She was refloated and taken in to the Kingroad.
Rochester	United Kingdom	The steamship ran aground at Boston, Massachusetts, United States. She was on a voyage from Boston to London. She had been refloated by 5 January 1881 and resumed her voyage.
Unionist	United Kingdom	The ship was abandoned in the North Sea. Her crew were rescued. Unionist was on a voyage from Rochester, Kent to Seaham, County Durham. She was towed in to Hartlepool, County Durham by Marie Leonie (United Kingdom).

== 31 December ==
List of shipwrecks: 31 December 1879
Ship	State	Description
Brahmin	United Kingdom	The ship was wrecked at sea. She was on a voyage from the Clyde to Bombay, India.
Cora	United Kingdom	The ship departed from Saint John's, Newfoundland Colony for Lisbon, Portugal. No further trace, reported missing.
Ellen	United Kingdom	The schooner was driven ashore and damaged at Randesund. Norway. She was on a voyage from Skien, Denmark to a Welsh port.
Lancastria	United Kingdom	The barque was driven ashore and wrecked at "Robenstein", Cape Colony with the loss of two of her crew.
Linda	United Kingdom	The steamship was driven ashore and sank at Civita Vecchia, Italy. Her crew were rescued.
Merkur	Norway	The schooner was driven ashore and severely damaged at Mandal, Norway. She was on a voyage from Kragerø to Wick, Caithness, United Kingdom.
Olive Leaf	United Kingdom	The schooner struck a sunken wreck and was damaged. She was on a voyage from Sunderland, County Durham to Portsmouth, Hampshire. She put in to Great Yarmouth, Norfolk.
Piako	New Zealand	The steamer struck a small, submerged rock near Morgen's Harbour, Whangārei, New Zealand and foundered.
Sophie Wilhelmine	Norway	The schooner was driven ashore and severely damaged at Mandal. She was on a voyage from Porsgrund to Peterhead, Aberdeenshire, United Kingdom.
Stucley	United Kingdom	The ketch was wrecked off Bude, Cornwall. Her three crew were rescued by the Bude Lifeboat.

== Unknown date ==
List of shipwrecks: Unknown date in December 1879
Ship	State	Description
Ada	United Kingdom	The ship was driven ashore. She was on a voyage from Singapore, Straits Settlements to Mauritius. She was refloated and taken in to Batavia, Netherlands East Indies. She was consequently condemned.
Adolph	Sweden	The barque was abandoned at sea before 14 December. Her crew were rescued. She was on a voyage from Helsingborg to London, United Kingdom. She came ashore at Lemvig, Denmark on 16 December and was wrecked.
Aggenatta	Norway	The schooner was wrecked on Norderney, Germany with the loss of five of her seven crew. She was on a voyage from Brevig to London.
Alfred	United Kingdom	The steamship ran aground and was damaged 2 nautical miles (3.7 km) off Bolderāja, Russia. She was refloated with assistance.
Ane Cecilie	Denmark	The schooner was driven ashore and wrecked at Vestervik, Sweden. She was on a voyage from Sonderberg, Sweden to Leith, Lothian, United Kingdom.
Archibald	(Dominion of Newfoundland) Newfoundland Colony	The schooner was wrecked. She was on a voyage from Labrador to Saint John's.
Archibald	United Kingdom	The schooner was driven ashore at the Hurst Castle, Hampshire.
Ayton	United Kingdom	The barque was run into by a steamship at Smyrna, Ottoman Empire and was severely damaged.
Azinga	Netherlands	The kuff foundered off Skagen, Denmark. She was on a voyage from Trelleborg, Sweden to London.
Balgownie	Denmark	The barque collided with the barque Star of Peace (United Kingdom) and was severely damaged. Balgownie then ran aground on the Vogelsand, in the North Sea off the coast of Germany. She was on a voyage from Hamburg, Germany to Charleston, South Carolina, United States.
Barden	United Kingdom	The ship was wrecked off the coast of Cornwall. Wreckage came ashore near Boscastle on 1 January 1881.
Beaver	Canada	The steamship was driven ashore on Hare Island, Quebec. Her crew survived.
Belgravia	United Kingdom	The barque was abandoned in the Atlantic Ocean. Her crew were rescued by St. Albans (United Kingdom). Belgravia was on a voyage from Quebec City, Canada to Greenock, Renfrewshire.
Belle	(Dominion of Newfoundland) Newfoundland Colony	The schooner was wrecked. She was on a voyage from Labrador to Saint John's.
Bellona	Norway	The brig was abandoned in the North Sea 120 nautical miles (220 km) south of Heligoland. Her crew were rescued by the smack Two Brothers (United Kingdom). Bellona was on a voyage from Kotka, Grand Duchy of Finland to Leith. She came ashore on Föhr, Germany on 28 December and was wrecked.
Bombay	United Kingdom	The steamship was destroyed by fire at Wusong, China.
Break	Norway	The ship was driven ashore and wrecked at Minatitlán, Mexico. She was on a voyage from Brownsville, Texas, United States to Minatitlán.
Bylgia	Norway	The ship foundered in the Baltic Sea. Her crew were rescued.
Cavaliere Squardelli	United Kingdom	The ship foundered in the West Indies. Her crew were rescued. She was on a voyage from the Clyde to Demerara, British Guiana.
Celestine	France	The ship was wrecked at Scoglitti, Sicily, Italy. Her crew were rescued.
Charles Bal	United States	The ship ran aground at Emshorn, Germany. She was on a voyage from New York to Emden, Germany.
Christina	Netherlands	The brig was wrecked on the Randzel Bank, off the coast of Friesland. She was on a voyage from Fredrikstad, Denmark to Amsterdam, North Holland.
City of Charlottetown	United Kingdom	The barque was driven ashore at Paraíba, Brazil. She was on a voyage from Paraíba to Liverpool, Lancashire. She was refloated on 13 December and put back to Paraíba.
City of Montreal	United Kingdom	The ship was abandoned in the Atlantic Ocean before 9 December. Her crew were rescued by the barque Energy (United Kingdom). City of Montreal was on a voyage from Quebec City to Greenock.
Columbus	Norway	The barque was driven ashore at Faro. Her crew were rescued. She was on a voyage from "Kappata" to Antwerp, Belgium.
Constance, and Emma Trechmann	United Kingdom	The steamship collided off the coast of Glamorgan. Constance put back to Cardiff. Emma Trechmann was beached at Penarth.
Copernicus	Belgium	The steamship ran aground on Flores Island, Azores. She was on a voyage from Antwerp to the River Plate.
Courier	United Kingdom	The brigantine was destroyed by fire at sea. Her crew were rescued. She was on a voyage from Rosario to Rio de Janeiro, Brazil.
Dauntless	United Kingdom	The ship was driven ashore and wrecked at "Kadava", Fiji before 4 December.
Dawn	United Kingdom	The schooner was abandoned in the Atlantic Ocean before 10 December. She was on a voyage from Cardiff, Glamorgan to Saint John's, Newfoundland Colony.
Dion	Norway	The barque was abandoned in the North Sea. She came ashore on Sylt, Germany on 4 December.
Elise	Germany	The ship collided with another vessel and was abandoned in the Pacific Ocean in a sinking condition. Her crew were rescued. She was on a voyage from Bremen to Callao, Peru.
Esperance	France	The barque was driven ashore and wrecked at Mazatlán, Mexico. She was on a voyage from Havre de Grâce, Seine-Inférieure to Mazatlán.
Fairy	United Kingdom	The schooner was driven ashore at Southend, Argyllshire. She was refloated and taken in to Islay, Inner Hebrides.
Fontabelle	United Kingdom	The barque was wrecked at "Salt Marsh", Jamaica with the loss of eight of the thirteen people on board.
Fortuna	Denmark	The ship was driven ashore and wrecked at Saltfleet, Lincolnshire, United Kingdom. She was on a voyage from Nyköping to Hull, Yorkshire.
Frankfurt Hall	United Kingdom	The barque was destroyed by fire at sea before 19 December. Her crew were rescued. She was on a voyage from Liverpool to Valparaíso, Chile.
Garibaldi	Italy	The ship was stranded at Weller's Beach, Consecon, Ontario, Canada with the loss of one of her five crew. She was on a voyage from Liverpool to Toronto, Ontario.
Gaucho	Flag unknown	The ship was wrecked at "Santa Anna". She was on a voyage from Santa Anna to London.
Georg Freiherr von Vincke	Germany	The brig was abandoned in the Baltic Sea. Her crew survived.
Germania	Germany	The steamship collided with the steamship Donati (United Kingdom) at Havre de Grâce and was severely damaged. She consequently sank at the quayside.
'Glenfruin	United Kingdom	The barque-rigged steamship foundered in the Pacific Ocean. Her crew were rescued. she was on a voyage from Victoria, British Columbia, Canada to a port in Oregon, United States.
Gloria	Germany	The brig was driven ashore on Öland, Sweden. She was refloated and towed in to Visby, Sweden.
Governorn Loch	(United Kingdom of Great Britain and Ireland) Isle of Man	The schooner was driven ashore at "Swytha", Orkney Islands. She had been refloated with assistance by 22 December.
Grunpast	Norway	The ship was abandoned in the Atlantic Ocean before 3 December.
Hardwick	United Kingdom	The ship was wrecked on Nexø, Denmark.
Hathersage	United Kingdom	The steamship was driven ashore in Chesapeake Bay. She was on a voyage from Baltimore, Maryland, United States to Rochefort, Charente-Inférieure, France. She wasrefloated and taken in to Baltimore.
Hawk	United Kingdom	The smack was holed by her anchor and was beached at Penarth, Glamorgan.
Henri IV	France	The steamship caught fire whilst on a voyage from Saint Vincent, Virgin Islands to Havre de Grâce. The fire was extinguished but she was severely damaged forward.
Joaquina	Spain	The barque ran aground and was wrecked on the Cayo de Piedra, Cuba. She was on a voyage from Santander to Havana, Cuba.
Johanne	Germany	The schooner was wrecked at Vestervik. She was on a voyage from Gävle, Sweden to Antwerp, Belgium.
Keepsake	United Kingdom	The brig was driven ashore and wrecked at Little River, Maine, United States after 17 December. She was on a voyage from Parrsboro, Nova Scotia, Canada to the Mumbles, Glamorgan.
Lady Louise	(Dominion of Newfoundland) Newfoundland Colony	The ship was abandoned in the Atlantic Ocean. She was on a voyage from Harbour Grace to Bristol, Gloucestershire, United Kingdom.
Lina	Russia	The schooner was towed in to Slite, Sweden in a waterlogged condition by the steamship Fiducia (Germany).
Lovebird	Germany	The steamship was abandoned in the North Sea. Her crew were rescued by the steamship Libau (Germany). Lovebird was on a voyage from Danzig to London.
Mainz 16	Germany	The steamship sank at Hanseweert, Zeeland, Netherlands. She was on a voyage from Antwerp to the Rhine.
Margaret McGowan	United Kingdom	The ship was driven ashore on "Sandy Beach", Islay, Inner Hebrides. She was on a voyage from Frome, Somerset to Londonderry.
Marie	Denmark	The schooner was wrecked in the Faroe Islands before 13 December. Her crew survived.
Mazeppa	United Kingdom	The steamship was sunk by ice off Ochakoff, Russia.
Minde	United Kingdom	The brig was driven ashore at Ballywater, County Antrim. She was on a voyage from Belfast, County Antrim to Newport, Monmouthshire.
Monica	United Kingdom	The steamship was driven ashore at South Shields, County Durham. She was refloated on 2 December.
Nanny	Germany	The ship was driven ashore on the Norwegian coast before 8 December. Her crew survived.
Nerio	(United Kingdom of Great Britain and Ireland) Jersey	The smack capsized at Burnham-on-Sea, Somerset. Her crew survived.
Nestoria	United Kingdom	The ship was driven ashore "in the Slieve". She was on a voyage from Skutskär, Sweden to Gravesend, Kent. She was refloated and resumed her voyage.
Nettlesworth	United Kingdom	The steamship ran aground on the Norgin Reef. She was on a voyage from Charleston to Reval, Russia.
Nunquam Dormio	United States	The ship was driven ashore on Bermuda. She was on a voyage from Savannah, Georgia to Liverpool. She was a total loss.
Okenbury	United Kingdom	The brig was driven ashore on "Sloe". She was on a voyage from Antwerp to Newcastle upon Tyne. She was later refloated with assistance.
Perseverance	United Kingdom	The brigantine was destroyed by fire off Wrabness, Essex. Her crew were rescued by the steamship Essex (United Kingdom).
Persian Monarch	United Kingdom	The steamship was driven ashore at New York. She was on a voyage from New York to London.
Rarah	Norway	The schooner was abandoned in the North Sea. She was subsequently towed in to Gravesend by the steamship Albana (Norway).
Rattler	United Kingdom	The tug was run down and sunk off Lundy Island, Devon by the barque Amazon (Norway) before 9 December. Her crew were rescued.
Ravenswood	(Dominion of Newfoundland) Newfoundland Colony	The brig was wrecked. She was on a voyage from Labrador to New York.
Reindeer	United Kingdom	The ship was driven ashore at Maassluis, South Holland, Netherlands. She was on a voyage from Rotterdam, South Holland to Ipswich, Suffolk. She was refloated and put in to Newcastle upon Tyne in a damaged condition.
Siam	France	The barque ran aground and sank at Barranquilla, United States of Colombia with the loss of her captain from her eight crew. She was on a voyage from Cardiff to Barranquilla.
Skyro	Flag unknown	The steamship was driven ashore at Ingerbournon Point, Ottoman Empire. She was on a voyage from Brăila, United Principalities to Gibraltar.
Spring	United Kingdom	The schooner collided with the ketch Enterprise ( (United Kingdom of Great Britain and Ireland) ) Jersey) and sank in the North Sea. Her crew were rescued by Enterprise. Spring was on a voyage from London to York.
Teutonia	United States	The ship was driven ashore and wrecked at Mazatlán.
Thomas Roy	Canada	The schooner was abandoned in the Atlantic Ocean before 6 December. She was on a voyage from Port Clyde, Nova Scotia to Saint-Pierre, Saint Pierre and Miquelon.
Victoria	Denmark	The steamship was driven ashore and wrecked at Hjørring with the loss of her captain. She was on a voyage from Newcastle upon Tyne to Copenhagen.
Victory	United Kingdom	The steamship foundered off the south coast of Spain after 19 December. She was on a voyage from the River Tyne to Gibraltar.
Warree	United Kingdom	The schooner was driven ashore on "Sandy Beach", Islay.
William	Germany	The barque was abandoned in the Baltic Sea. She was on a voyage from Stettin to Gloucester, United Kingdom. She was towed in to Geestemünde in a waterlogged condition.
W. T. Harward	United States	The ship was driven ashore at Philadelphia. She was on a voyage from Calais, France to Philadelphia.
