= Angostura =

Angostura may refer to:

== Places ==
=== Mexico ===
- Angostura, Sinaloa, a city in north-west Mexico
  - Angostura Municipality, Sinaloa, a municipality in Sinaloa, Mexico
- Puerto de la Angostura, Coahuila, site of the 1847 Battle of Buena Vista between American and Mexican forces

=== Venezuela ===
- Angostura, Venezuela, the former name of Ciudad Bolívar
- Angostura Municipality, Venezuela, a municipality in Bolivar State

=== Other places ===
- Angostura River, a river in Chile
- Angostura, Antioquia, a municipality in the Department of Antioquia, Colombia
- Angostura, South Dakota, a populated area in Fall River County, South Dakota, US
- Angostura, Sullana, a village in Sullana Province, Peru
- La Angostura (disambiguation)
- Villa La Angostura, a mountain town in Neuquén, Argentina

== Other uses ==
- Angostura (plant), a genus in the family Rutaceae
- Angostura bark, a spice made from the bark of the tree Angostura trifoliata
- Angostura bitters, a flavoring
- Congress of Angostura, an 1819–1821 legislative body of Gran Colombia
- House of Angostura, a Trinidad and Tobago company manufacturing angostura bitters

== See also ==
- Primera Angostura, a part of the Strait of Magellan, Chile
- Segunda Angostura, a part of the Strait of Magellan, Chile
- Angostura Guías, in Patagonia, Chile
- Angostura Inglesa, in Patagonia, Chile
- Angostura de Paine, a locale on Route 5 in both Santiago Metropolitan Region and O'Higgins Region of Chile
- Angostura Bridge, a bridge near Ciudad Bolívar, Venezuela
- Angostura Colorada Formation, a geological formation in Argentina
- Angostura Dam (disambiguation)
- Angostura Reservoir, South Dakota
- La Angostura (disambiguation)
- Angustura, Minas Gerais, Brazil
- Angustura, New Mexico, US
