= Baton Rouge (disambiguation) =

Baton Rouge is the capital city of the U.S. state of Louisiana.

Baton Rouge may also refer to:

== Ships ==
- USC&GS Baton Rouge, previously USCS Baton Rouge, a survey ship in commission in the United States Coast Survey from 1875 to 1878 and in the United States Coast and Geodetic Survey from 1878 to 1880
- USS Baton Rouge, a United States Navy submarine in commission from 1977 to 1995

== Arts ==
- Baton Rouge (band), American hard rock band
- Bâton rouge (1985 film), a French film
- Baton Rouge (1988 film), a Spanish film

== Other uses ==
- Baton Rouge, South Carolina, an unincorporated community
- Bâton Rouge (restaurant), a Canadian restaurant chain
- Petit bâton rouge, a small red stick used for color grading by the Tabasco pepper harvesters
