= Batt (surname) =

Batt is an English surname, derived from Bartholomew. Notable people with the surname include:

- Batt (Gentlemen cricketer), English cricketer (no first name known)
- Andrey Batt (born 1985), Russian rapper, actor, producer
- Bryan Batt (born 1963), American actor
- Charles Batt (1928–2007), Australian politician
- Damian Batt (born 1984), English footballer
- David Alan Batt (born 1958), the birth name of English musician David Sylvian
- Dennis E. Batt (1886–1941), American political activist and journalist
- Isaac Batt (ca. 1725–1791), Canadian fur trader
- J Batt (born 1981), American sports administrator
- Jacque Batt (1926–2014), First Lady of Idaho 1995–1999
- Jay Batt (1960/1961–2025), American politician
- John Batt (born 1935), Australian jurist
- John Batt (solicitor and composer) (1929–2017), British solicitor, author and (as John Malcolm) composer
- Mike Batt (born 1949), English songwriter
- Neil Batt (born 1937), Australian politician
- Phil Batt (1927–2023), American politician
- Ryley Batt (born 1989), Australian wheelchair rugby player
- Sarah Holland-Batt (born 1982), Australian poet, critic, academic
- Stephen Batt (born 1959), the birth name of English musician Steve Jansen
- Terry Batt (born 1949) Australian sculptor
