= Saint-Genest =

Saint-Genest may refer to the following places in France:

- Saint-Genest, Allier, a commune in the department of Allier
- Saint-Genest, Vosges, a commune in the department of Vosges
- Saint-Genest-d'Ambière, a commune in the department of Vienne
- Saint-Genest-de-Beauzon, a commune in the department of Ardèche
- Saint-Genest-de-Contest, a commune in the department of Tarn
- Saint-Genest-Lachamp, a commune in the department of Ardèche
- Saint-Genest-Lerpt, a commune in the department of Loire
- Saint-Genest-Malifaux, a commune in the department of Loire
- Saint-Genest-sur-Roselle, a commune in the department of Haute-Vienne
- Bouchy-Saint-Genest, a commune in the department of Marne
- Saint-Remy-en-Bouzemont-Saint-Genest-et-Isson, a commune in the department of Marne
