= Batonga =

Batonga may refer to:

- Tonga people of Malawi
- Tonga people of Zambia and Zimbabwe
- The Batonga Foundation, for adolescent girls in sub-Saharan Africa
- "Batonga", a 1991 song by Angélique Kidjo

== See also ==
- Batong (disambiguation)
