= Villiers-Saint-Georges =

- Commune
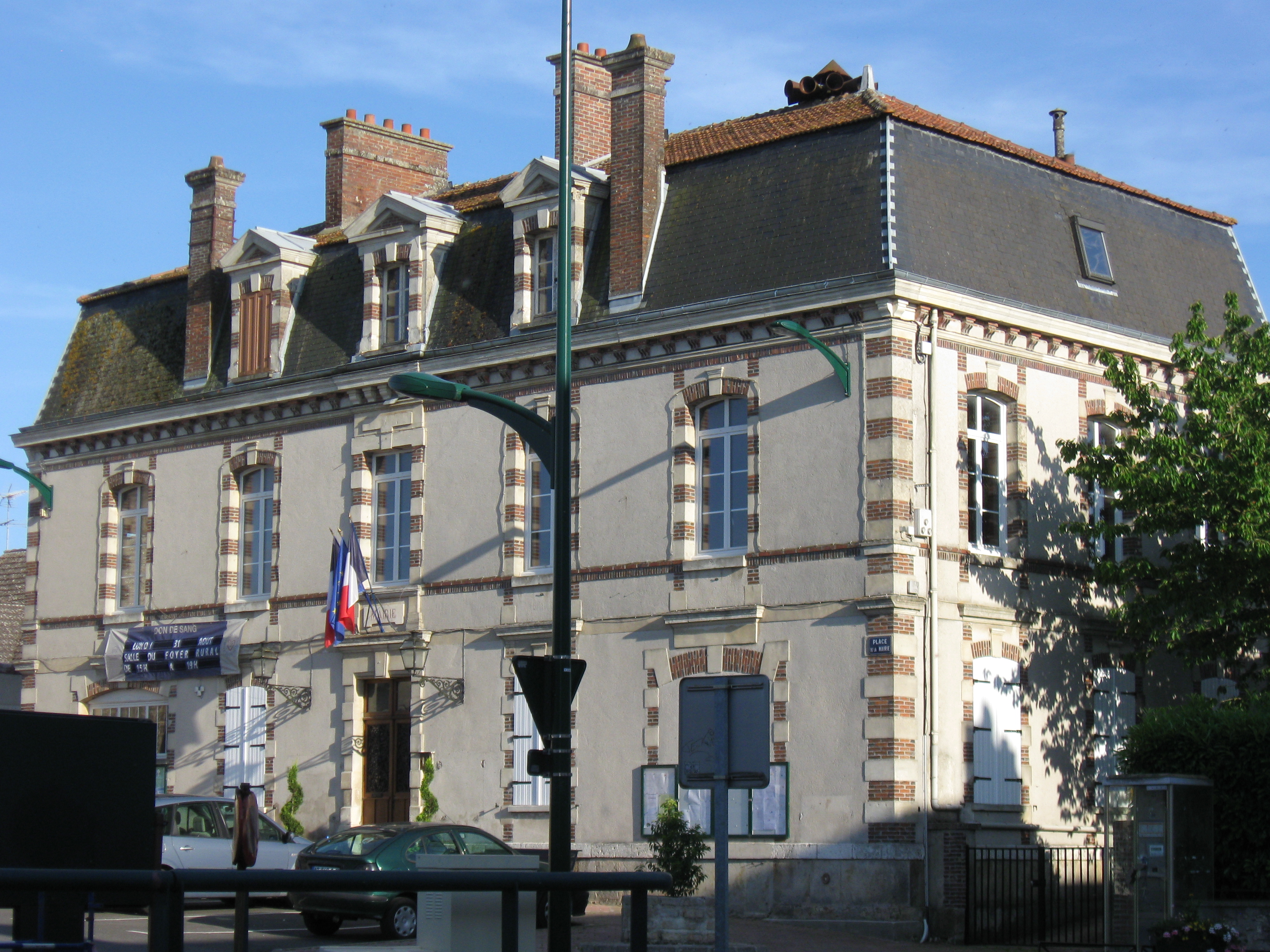
- The town hall in Villiers-Saint-Georges
- Location of Villiers-Saint-Georges
- Location within France Location within Île-de-France (region)
- Coordinates: 48°39′03″N 3°24′21″E
- Country: France
- Region: Île-de-France
- Department: Seine-et-Marne
- Arrondissement: Provins
- Canton: Provins
- Intercommunality: Provinois

Government
  - Mayor (2020–2026): Tony Pita
- Area^{1}: 33.27 km^{2} (12.85 sq mi)
- Highest elevation: 191 m (627 ft)
- Lowest elevation: 140 m (460 ft)
- Population (2023): 1,160
  - Density: 34.9/km^{2} (90.3/sq mi)
- Time zone: UTC+01:00 (CET)
  - Summer (DST): UTC+02:00 (CEST)
- INSEE/Postal code: 77519 /77560
- ^{1} French Land Register data, which excludes lakes, ponds, glaciers > 1 km^{2} (0.386 sq mi or 247 acres) and river estuaries.

Villiers-Saint-Georges (French pronunciation: [vilje sɛ̃ ʒɔʁʒ]) is a commune in the Seine-et-Marne department in the Île-de-France region in north-central France.

== Geography ==
The river Aubetin flows westward through the northern part of the commune.

== See also ==
- Communes of the Seine-et-Marne department
