= Batton =

Batton is an English and French (IPA: [batɔ̃]) surname with several proposed etymologies. In English it may be a diminutive form of Batt – itself derived from the Middle English Batte, a pet form of Bartholomew – and in French a variant of Baston. The occurrence in Germany is attributable to the influx of Huguenot refugees in the 17th and 18th century. Notable people with this name include:

- Chris Batton (born 1954), American baseball pitcher
- Dave Batton (born 1956), retired American basketball player
- Désiré-Alexandre Batton (1798–1855), French composer
- Gary Batton (born 1966), Native American politician
- J. D. Batton (1911–1981), American municipal police chief
