= La Celle-sur-Morin =

- Commune
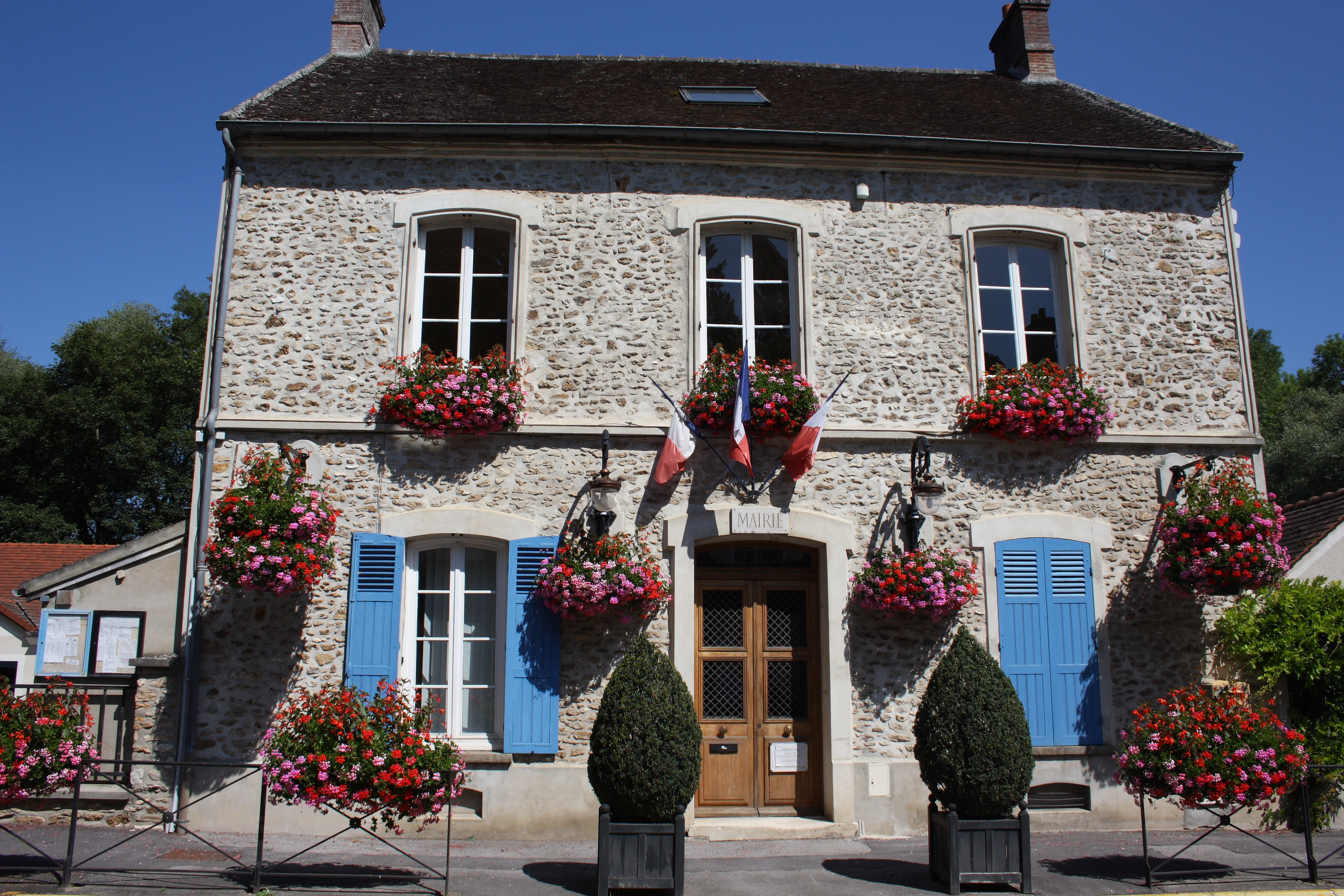
- The town hall in La Celle-sur-Morin

- Coat of arms
- Location of La Celle-sur-Morin
- Location within France Location within Île-de-France (region)
- Coordinates: 48°48′14″N 2°58′04″E
- Country: France
- Region: Île-de-France
- Department: Seine-et-Marne
- Arrondissement: Meaux
- Canton: Coulommiers
- Intercommunality: CA Coulommiers Pays de Brie

Government
  - Mayor (2020–2026): Jacqueline Schaufler
- Area^{1}: 7.56 km^{2} (2.92 sq mi)
- Highest elevation: 134 m (440 ft)
- Lowest elevation: 51 m (167 ft)
- Population (2023): 1,235
  - Density: 163/km^{2} (423/sq mi)
- Time zone: UTC+01:00 (CET)
  - Summer (DST): UTC+02:00 (CEST)
- INSEE/Postal code: 77063 /77515
- ^{1} French Land Register data, which excludes lakes, ponds, glaciers > 1 km^{2} (0.386 sq mi or 247 acres) and river estuaries.

La Celle-sur-Morin (French pronunciation: [la sɛl syʁ mɔʁɛ̃], literally La Celle on Morin) is a commune in the Seine-et-Marne department in the Île-de-France region in north-central France.

== Demographics ==
The inhabitants are called Cellois.

== See also ==
- Communes of the Seine-et-Marne department
