= La Angostura =

La Angostura may refer to:

- La Angostura, Santa Cruz, a town in Bolivia
- La Angostura Lake, Bolivia
- Angostura Dam (Mexico)
- Villa La Angostura, a village in Argentina
- La Angostura, a valley on Gran Canaria

== See also ==
- Angostura (disambiguation)
