= Aubetin =

River in France

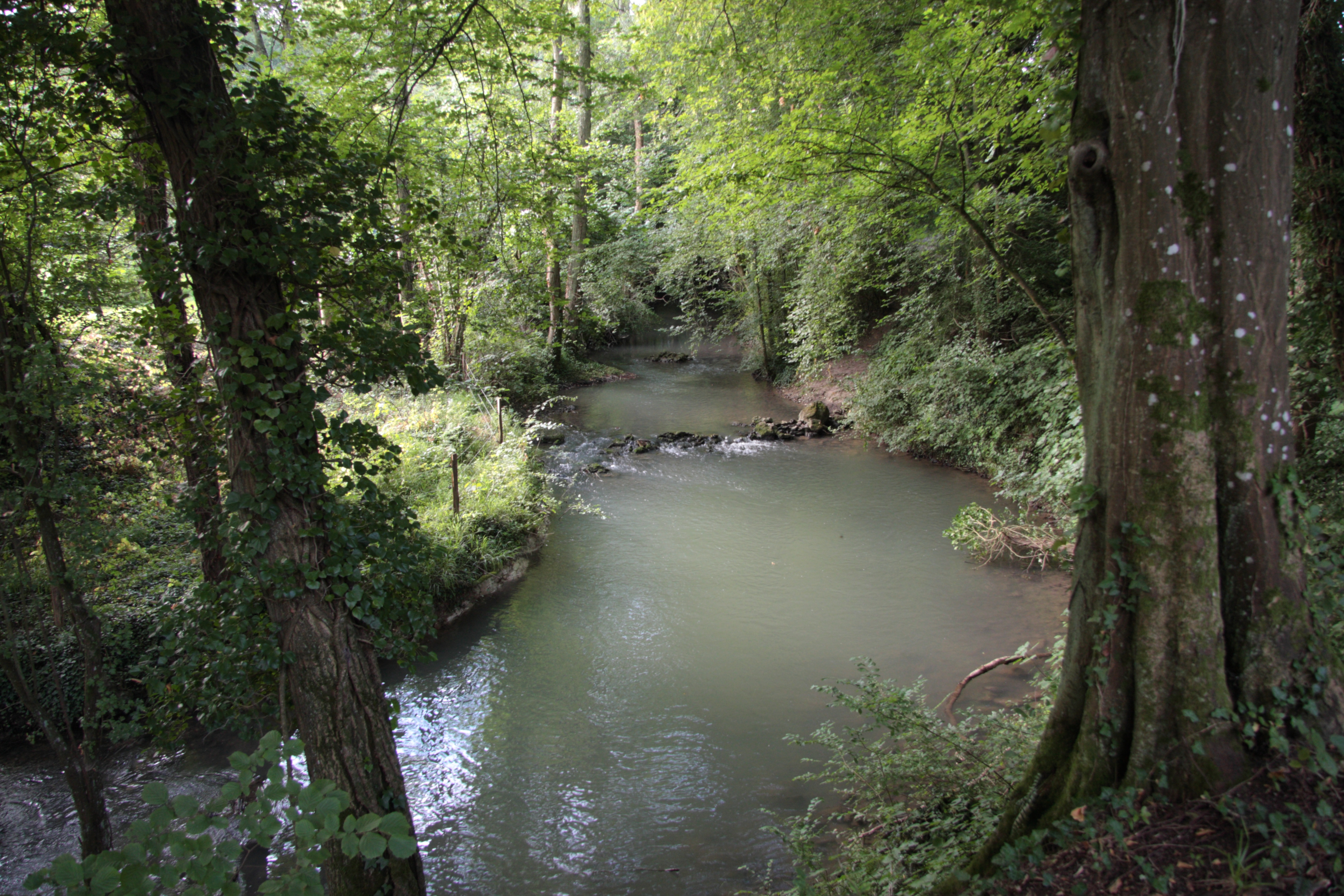

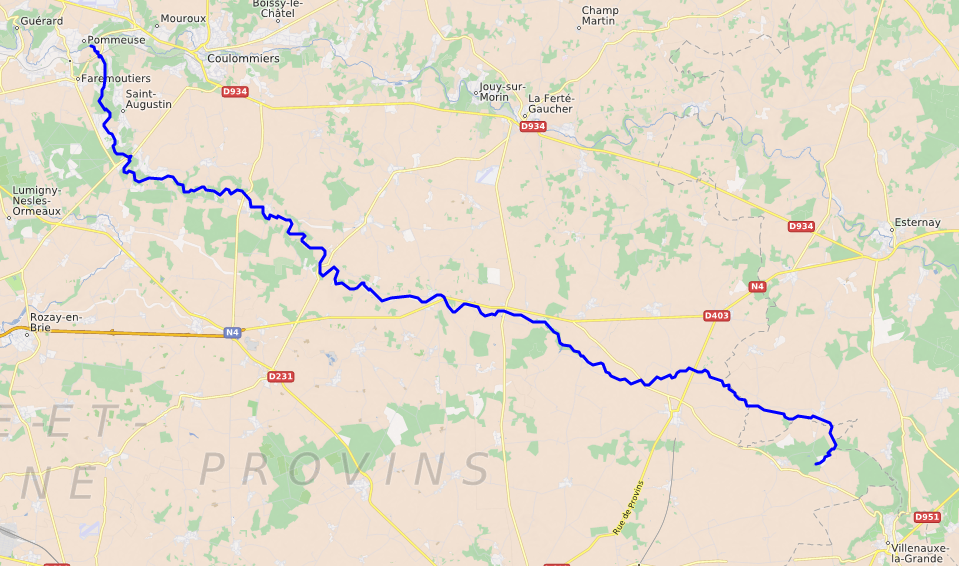

Location
- Country: France

Physical characteristics
- Source
  - location: Les Essarts-le-Vicomte
  - coordinates: 48°40′05″N 03°32′14″E
  - elevation: 177 m (581 ft)
- Mouth
  - location: Grand Morin
  - coordinates: 48°48′56″N 03°00′26″E
  - elevation: 60 m (200 ft)
- Length: 61.2 km (38.0 mi)
- Basin size: 270 km^{2} (100 sq mi)
- Discharge
  - average: 1.5 m^{3}/s (53 cu ft/s)

Basin features
- Progression: Grand Morin→ Marne→ Seine→ English Channel

The Aubetin is a 61.2-kilometre (38.0 mi) long river in the Marne and Seine-et-Marne départements, northeastern France. Its source is at Les Essarts-le-Vicomte, 20 kilometres (12 mi) northeast of Nogent-sur-Seine. It flows generally west-northwest. It is a left tributary of the Grand Morin into which it flows at Pommeuse, 5 kilometres (3 mi) west of Coulommiers.

== Communes along its course ==
This list is ordered from source to mouth:

- Marne: Les Essarts-le-Vicomte, Bouchy-Saint-Genest,
- Seine-et-Marne: Louan-Villegruis-Fontaine, Villiers-Saint-Georges, Augers-en-Brie, Cerneux, Courtacon, Beton-Bazoches, Frétoy, Dagny, Amillis, Beautheil, Saints, Mauperthuis, Saint-Augustin, Pommeuse,
