= Augers-en-Brie =

- Commune
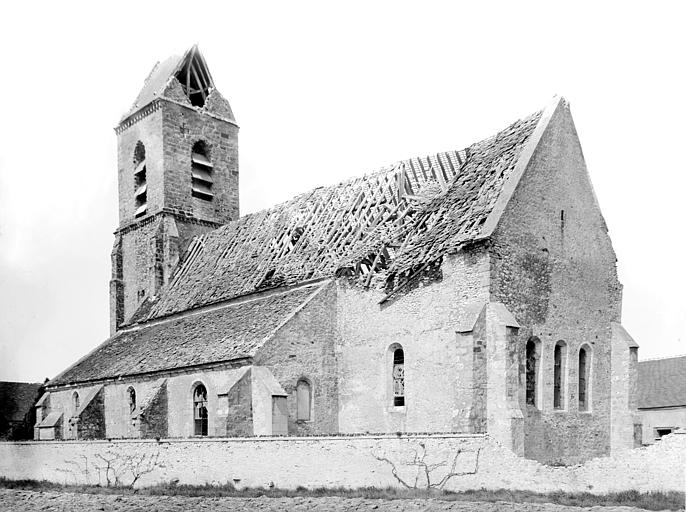
- The ruined church in Augers-en-Brie around 1919
- Location of Augers-en-Brie
- Location within France Location within Île-de-France (region)
- Coordinates: 48°40′49″N 3°21′31″E
- Country: France
- Region: Île-de-France
- Department: Seine-et-Marne
- Arrondissement: Provins
- Canton: Provins
- Intercommunality: CC Provinois

Government
  - Mayor (2020–2026): Alain Hanneton
- Area^{1}: 13.5 km^{2} (5.2 sq mi)
- Highest elevation: 168 m (551 ft)
- Lowest elevation: 134 m (440 ft)
- Population (2023): 265
  - Density: 19.6/km^{2} (50.8/sq mi)
- Time zone: UTC+01:00 (CET)
  - Summer (DST): UTC+02:00 (CEST)
- INSEE/Postal code: 77012 /77560
- ^{1} French Land Register data, which excludes lakes, ponds, glaciers > 1 km^{2} (0.386 sq mi or 247 acres) and river estuaries.

Augers-en-Brie (French pronunciation: [oʒe ɑ̃ bʁi], literally Augers in Brie) is a commune in the Seine-et-Marne department in the Île-de-France region in north-central France.

== Geography ==
The river Aubetin flows northwestward through the commune.

== Demographics ==
The inhabitants are called Augreois.

== See also ==
- Communes of the Seine-et-Marne department
