= Les Essarts-le-Vicomte =

- Commune
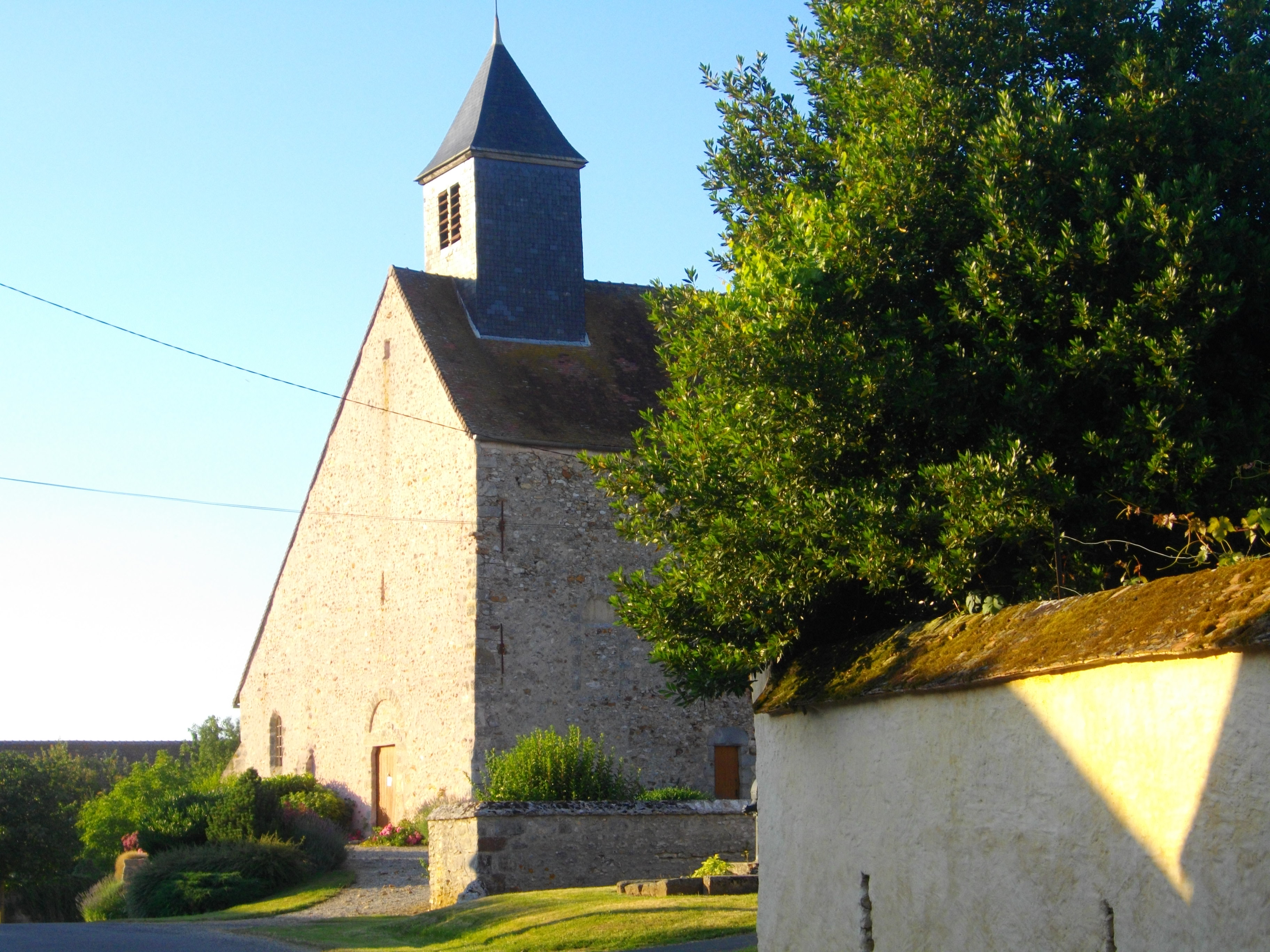
- The church in Eglise St-Michel 2.JPG

- Coat of arms
- Location of Les Essarts-le-Vicomte
- Location within France Location within Grand Est
- Coordinates: 48°39′39″N 3°33′21″E
- Country: France
- Region: Grand Est
- Department: Marne
- Arrondissement: Épernay
- Canton: Sézanne-Brie et Champagne
- Intercommunality: Sézanne-Sud Ouest Marnais

Government
  - Mayor (2020–2026): Cyril Laurent
- Area^{1}: 11.29 km^{2} (4.36 sq mi)
- Elevation: 182 m (597 ft)
- Population (2023): 134
  - Density: 11.9/km^{2} (30.7/sq mi)
- Time zone: UTC+01:00 (CET)
  - Summer (DST): UTC+02:00 (CEST)
- INSEE/Postal code: 51236 /51310
- ^{1} French Land Register data, which excludes lakes, ponds, glaciers > 1 km^{2} (0.386 sq mi or 247 acres) and river estuaries.

Les Essarts-le-Vicomte (French pronunciation: [lez‿esaʁ lə vikɔ̃t]) is a commune in the Marne department in north-eastern France.

== Geography ==
The river Aubetin has its source in the commune.

== See also ==
- Communes of the Marne department
