= Cerneux =

- Commune
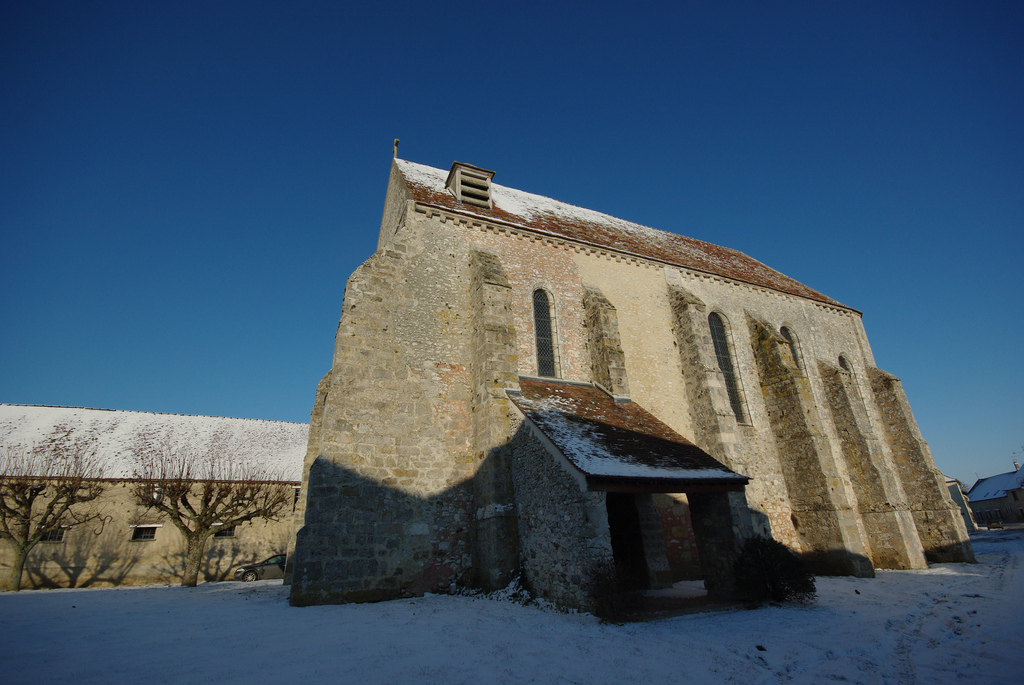
- The church in Cerneux
- Location of Cerneux
- Location within France Location within Île-de-France (region)
- Coordinates: 48°41′38″N 3°20′47″E
- Country: France
- Region: Île-de-France
- Department: Seine-et-Marne
- Arrondissement: Provins
- Canton: Provins
- Intercommunality: CC Provinois

Government
  - Mayor (2020–2026): Olivier Mazzuchelli
- Area^{1}: 22.10 km^{2} (8.53 sq mi)
- Highest elevation: 192 m (630 ft)
- Lowest elevation: 132 m (433 ft)
- Population (2023): 272
  - Density: 12.3/km^{2} (31.9/sq mi)
- Time zone: UTC+01:00 (CET)
  - Summer (DST): UTC+02:00 (CEST)
- INSEE/Postal code: 77066 /77320
- ^{1} French Land Register data, which excludes lakes, ponds, glaciers > 1 km^{2} (0.386 sq mi or 247 acres) and river estuaries.

Cerneux (French pronunciation: [sɛʁnø]) is a commune in the Seine-et-Marne department in the Île-de-France region in north-central France.

== Geography ==
The river Aubetin forms part of the commune's southern border.

== Demographics ==
The inhabitants are called Cernois.

== See also ==
- Communes of the Seine-et-Marne department
