= Courtacon =

- Commune
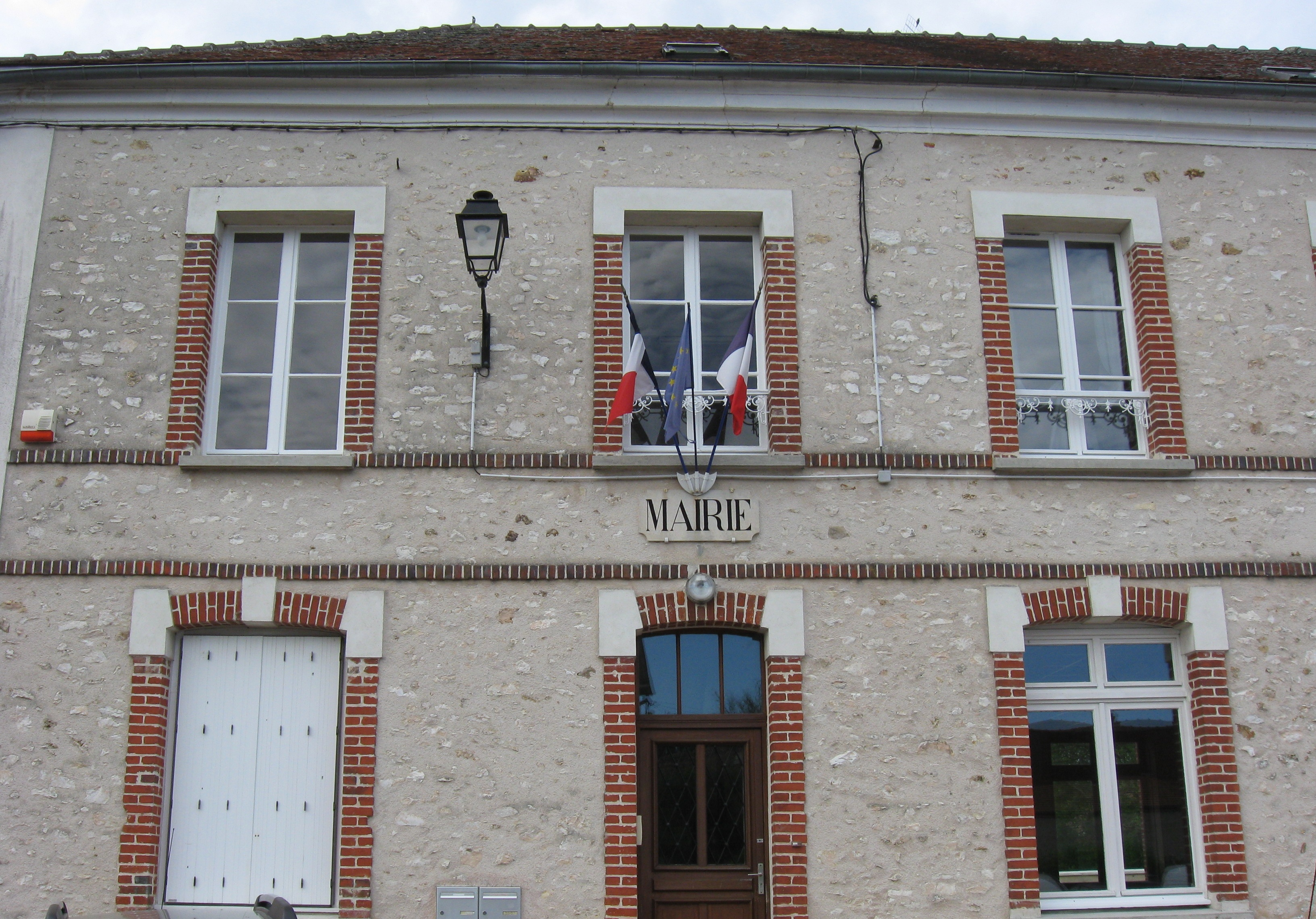
- The town hall in Courtacon
- Location of Courtacon
- Location within France Location within Île-de-France (region)
- Coordinates: 48°41′46″N 3°17′33″E
- Country: France
- Region: Île-de-France
- Department: Seine-et-Marne
- Arrondissement: Provins
- Canton: Provins
- Intercommunality: CC Provinois

Government
  - Mayor (2020–2026): Didier Agnus
- Area^{1}: 11.88 km^{2} (4.59 sq mi)
- Highest elevation: 184 m (604 ft)
- Lowest elevation: 132 m (433 ft)
- Population (2023): 245
  - Density: 20.6/km^{2} (53.4/sq mi)
- Time zone: UTC+01:00 (CET)
  - Summer (DST): UTC+02:00 (CEST)
- INSEE/Postal code: 77137 /77560
- ^{1} French Land Register data, which excludes lakes, ponds, glaciers > 1 km^{2} (0.386 sq mi or 247 acres) and river estuaries.

Courtacon (French pronunciation: [kuʁtakɔ̃]) is a commune in the Seine-et-Marne department in the Île-de-France region in north-central France.

== Geography ==
The river Aubetin flows westward through the southern part of the commune, forms part of its south-eastern and south-western borders and crosses the village.

== Demographics ==
The inhabitants are called Courtaconnais.

== See also ==
- Communes of the Seine-et-Marne department
