= Isaac Batt =

Isaac Batt (c. 1730 – 1791) was a Canadian fur trader. He was born to parents Dantzick Batt and Sarah Lindsel. He had a younger brother, Dantzick, baptized January 23, 1729. Isaac was baptized January 7, 1731 in Widford, Hertfordshire, England. He was a fur trader mostly with the Hudson's Bay Company (HBC) and the first record of him dates to 1754. At that time he had a contract to serve as a labourer at York Factory (Man.).

Batt quickly proved to be useful in the "Inland trade"' aspect of the company business and was influential amongst the Indians near present day The Pas, Manitoba. Batt married a Cree chief's daughter in 1756 and had one daughter Margaret Nistichio Batt. Nistichio, Cree for three-persons-in-one, was born in 1757 in what was then Rupertsland. She was raised to be at home in both native and Scottish cultures. In 1758 he was west of Cumberland Lake, in 1763 near The Pas and in a later year on the upper Assiniboine River. In 1771/72 he was with Louis Primeau. In August 1773 he and James Batt left York Factory, Manitoba but had to turn back because of low water. In 1776, he hired his services to Joseph Frobisher, one of the "Pedlars" who carried on trade competitive to the HBC. He did, however, return to company services the next year and finished his life in the inland trade. In 1791 he left Manchester House to go hunting with some Indians he did not know. They robbed and murdered him. He was one of the few HBC men killed by Indians.

Batt epitomizes the type of service rendered by many of the early inland employees of the Company. Although illiterate, and therefore unsuited to keeping proper records and making written reports, he won the trust of the natives and married into their society. He left descendants in the country where he died. "Isaac's House", a temporary post somewhere downstream from Prince Albert, Saskatchewan was named after him.

== References links ==
- Brown, Jennifer S.H. (1979). "Batt, Isaac". In Halpenny, Francess G. (ed.). Dictionary of Canadian Biography. Vol. IV (1771–1800) (online ed.). University of Toronto Press.
- Morton, Arthur S (1939). A History of the Canadian West to 1870-71: Being a History of Rupert's Land (The Hudson's Bay Company's Territory) and of the North West Territory (including the Pacific Slope). Thomas Nelson & Sons Limited.
