= Angostura Dam =

Angostura Dam may refer to:

- Angostura Dam (U.S.), on the Cheyenne River
- Angostura Dam (Mexico), on the Grijalva River
- Angostura Dam (Chile), on the Bío Bío River
- Angostura Dam (Costa Rica), on the Reventazón River
- Angostura Diversion Dam, New Mexico
