= Beton-Bazoches =

- Commune
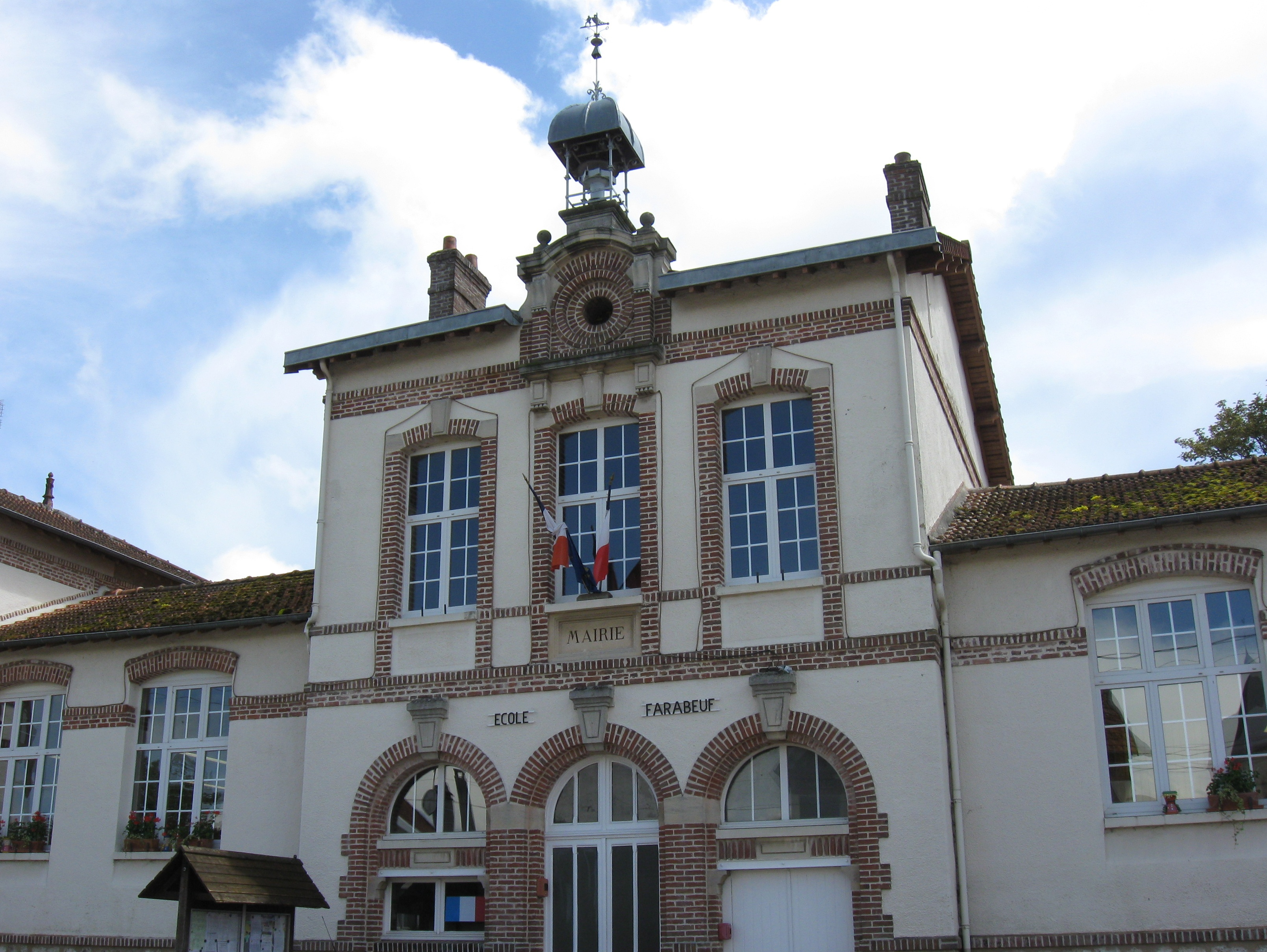
- The town hall in Beton-Bazoches
- Location of Beton-Bazoches
- Location within France Location within Île-de-France (region)
- Coordinates: 48°42′06″N 3°14′42″E
- Country: France
- Region: Île-de-France
- Department: Seine-et-Marne
- Arrondissement: Provins
- Canton: Provins
- Intercommunality: CC Provinois

Government
  - Mayor (2020–2026): Alain Boullot
- Area^{1}: 18.32 km^{2} (7.07 sq mi)
- Highest elevation: 183 m (600 ft)
- Lowest elevation: 128 m (420 ft)
- Population (2023): 890
  - Density: 49/km^{2} (130/sq mi)
- Time zone: UTC+01:00 (CET)
  - Summer (DST): UTC+02:00 (CEST)
- INSEE/Postal code: 77032 /77320
- ^{1} French Land Register data, which excludes lakes, ponds, glaciers > 1 km^{2} (0.386 sq mi or 247 acres) and river estuaries.

Beton-Bazoches is a commune in the Seine-et-Marne department in the Île-de-France region in north-central France.

== Geography ==
The river Aubetin flows westward through the commune and crosses the village.

== Population ==
Historical population
Year	Pop.	±% p.a.
1968	549	—
1975	557	+0.21%
1982	538	−0.49%
1990	633	+2.05%
1999	700	+1.12%
2007	754	+0.93%
2012	843	+2.26%
2017	906	+1.45%
2023	890	−0.30%
Source: INSEE

== See also ==
- Communes of the Seine-et-Marne department
