= Batoni =

Batoni may refer to:

- Batoni (title), a Georgian honorific
- Batoni, Italy, a hamlet
- Pompeo Batoni (1708–1787), Italian painter

== See also ==
- Batöni waterfall arena, a place with five waterfalls in the Alps, south of Weisstannen, canton of St. Gallen, Switzerland
- Batumi, a city in the country of Georgia
