= Bouchy-Saint-Genest =

- Commune
- Coat of arms
- Location of Bouchy-Saint-Genest
- Location within France Location within Grand Est
- Coordinates: 48°39′00″N 3°30′33″E
- Country: France
- Region: Grand Est
- Department: Marne
- Arrondissement: Épernay
- Canton: Sézanne-Brie et Champagne

Government
  - Mayor (2024–2026): Jean-Michel Collignon
- Area^{1}: 19.69 km^{2} (7.60 sq mi)
- Elevation: 84 m (276 ft)
- Population (2023): 213
  - Density: 10.8/km^{2} (28.0/sq mi)
- Time zone: UTC+01:00 (CET)
  - Summer (DST): UTC+02:00 (CEST)
- INSEE/Postal code: 51071 /51310
- ^{1} French Land Register data, which excludes lakes, ponds, glaciers > 1 km^{2} (0.386 sq mi or 247 acres) and river estuaries.

Bouchy-Saint-Genest is a commune of the Marne department in northeastern France.

== Geography ==
The river Aubetin flows northwest through the southern part of the commune and forms part of its western border.

== Population ==
Historical population
Year	Pop.	±% p.a.
1968	189	—
1975	149	−3.34%
1982	150	+0.10%
1990	157	+0.57%
1999	162	+0.35%
2007	157	−0.39%
2012	186	+3.45%
2017	193	+0.74%
2023	213	+1.66%
Source: INSEE

== See also ==
- Communes of the Marne department
