= Baton of Athens =

Ancient Greek poet

Baton (Ancient Greek: Βάτων) was an Athenian comic poet of the New Comedy, who flourished about 280 BCE.

We have fragments of the following comedies by him:

- The Aetolian(s) (Αἰτωλός or Αιτωλοί)
- The Euergetes (Ευεργέται)
- Audrophonos (Αυδροφόνος)
- Deceiving Together (Συνεξαπατῶν)

His plays appear to have been chiefly designed to ridicule the philosophers of the day.

His name is incorrectly written in some passages of the ancient authors, variously as "Battos" (Βάττος), "Batton" (Βάττων), or "Bathon" (Βάθων).
