= Baton (mythology) =

Character from Greek mythology

Baton (Ancient Greek: Βάτων) is a character from Greek mythology.

Image of Amphiaraus and Baton in a chariot.

He was said to have been the charioteer of the hero Amphiaraus, and that both belonged to the house of the legendary seer Melampus. After the war of the Seven against Thebes, both were swallowed up by the earth.

Baton was afterwards worshipped as a hero, and had a sanctuary at Argos. He was represented on the chest of Cypselus, and at Delphi his statue stood by the side of that of Amphiaraus, both having been dedicated there by the Argives.

The renowned 6th-century grammarian Stephanus of Byzantium wrote that, after the disappearance of Amphiaraus, Baton emigrated to the town of Harpyia in Illyria; but Stephanus seems to confuse here the mythical Baton with one of the historical people bearing the Illyrian name Bato.
