= Bethon =

- Commune
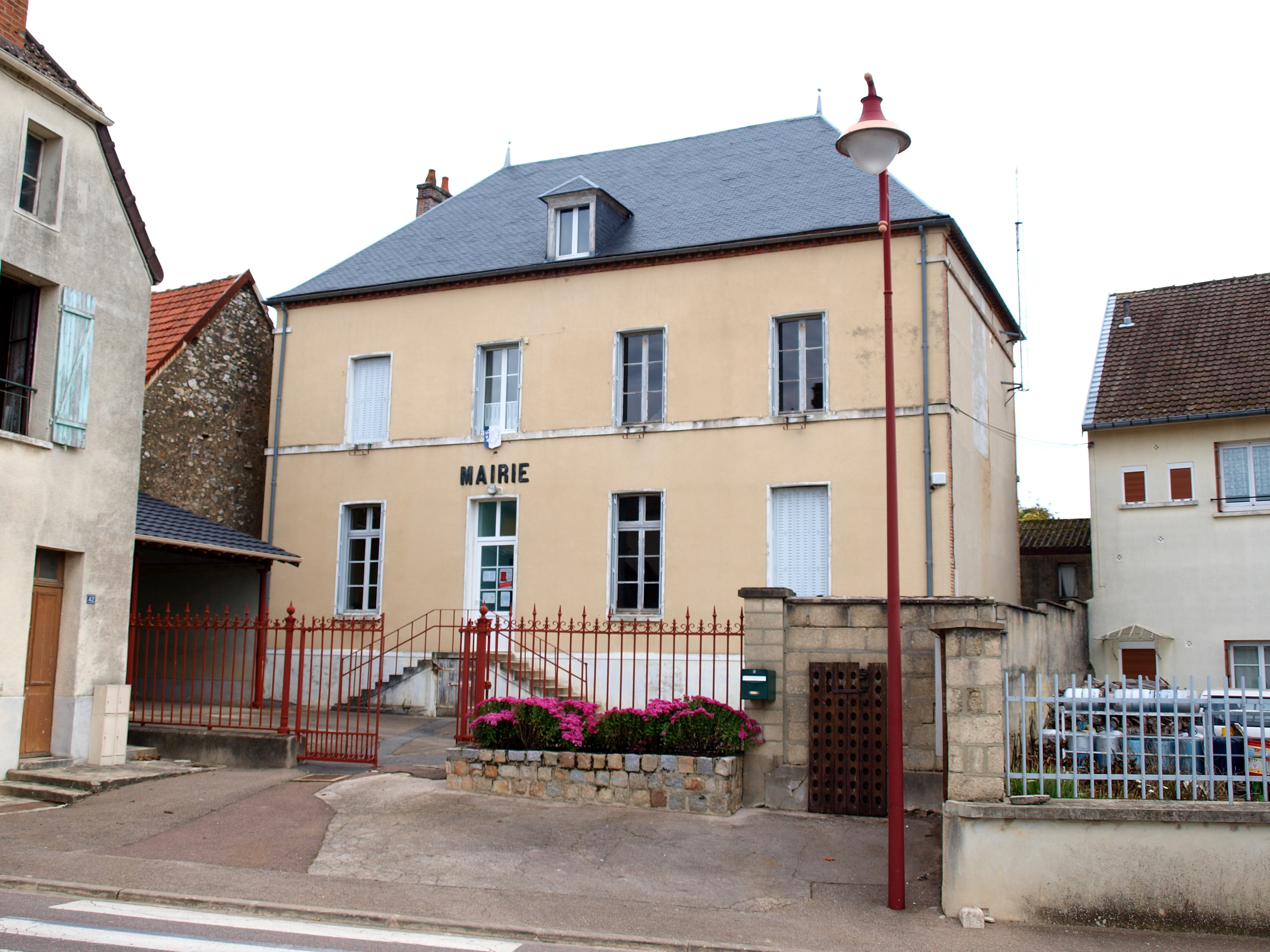
- The town hall in Bethon
- Location of Bethon
- Location within France Location within Grand Est
- Coordinates: 48°36′48″N 3°36′56″E
- Country: France
- Region: Grand Est
- Department: Marne
- Arrondissement: Épernay
- Canton: Sézanne-Brie et Champagne

Government
  - Mayor (2020–2026): Daniel Gomes de Pinho
- Area^{1}: 15.23 km^{2} (5.88 sq mi)
- Elevation: 170 m (560 ft)
- Population (2023): 222
  - Density: 14.6/km^{2} (37.8/sq mi)
- Time zone: UTC+01:00 (CET)
  - Summer (DST): UTC+02:00 (CEST)
- INSEE/Postal code: 51056 /51260
- ^{1} French Land Register data, which excludes lakes, ponds, glaciers > 1 km^{2} (0.386 sq mi or 247 acres) and river estuaries.

Bethon (French pronunciation: [bətɔ̃]) is a commune in the Marne department in northeastern France.

== Population ==
Historical population
Year	Pop.	±% p.a.
1968	319	—
1975	300	−0.87%
1982	296	−0.19%
1990	291	−0.21%
1999	274	−0.67%
2007	265	−0.42%
2012	287	+1.61%
2017	281	−0.42%
2023	222	−3.85%
Source: INSEE

== See also ==
- Communes of the Marne department
