= Baton Bob =

American artist

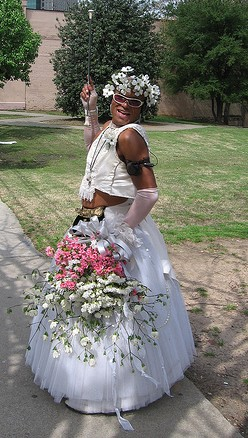
Baton Bob in a wedding dress. He more frequently wears a tutu.

Bob Jamerson, known as Baton Bob, is a well known local character and costumed street performer, currently based in Atlanta, Georgia. Baton Bob used to live in St. Louis, Missouri and in both cities is a significant local personality. He typically marches down urban sidewalks dressed in a tutu and occasionally a tiara. As his name suggests, he almost always twirls a baton as well. His stated goal is to amuse and cheer passersby, to "lift people’s spirits and put a simple smile on people’s faces during their daily routine". He occasionally calls himself the "Ambassador of Mirth".

== Origin ==
Jamerson grew up an only child on a farm in Martinsville, Virginia. As a boy, he became enthralled with band majorettes at college football games. When he went to high school, he asked to be his school's first male baton twirler. Wearing a cheerleader's sweater and white pants with gold stripes, he often was tempted to outperform the majorettes. Jamerson eventually moved to St. Louis and worked as a flight attendant, but was laid off after the 9/11 attacks (he now works as a floral designer). To counter his depression, a psychologist recommended he do things that brought him joy and so Jamerson began twirling his baton in public again. He expanded his wardrobe of transgressive costumes and marched through city streets several afternoons every week. Although some have gossiped that he is "crazy", there is no serious indication that this is true.

Baton Bob's motive to entertain is often tied to the current state of the world. Though he created his character to raise peoples' spirits after the 9/11 attacks, other events have caused him to continue. When interviewed by CNN, he made reference to the wars in Iraq and Afghanistan, and the Indian Ocean tsunami of 2004.

== Events precipitating his departure from St. Louis ==
Press reports indicate the public in Atlanta highly appreciates Baton Bob. Though he was appreciated by some, he annoyed others in St. Louis and Atlanta as well. Several exceptional events precipitated his departure.

- During the summer of 2003, an observer mooned the character. Both men mutually escalated the situation until the unidentified observer struck Baton Bob in the cheek, an injury that required five stitches. The observer was later arrested by St. Louis detectives and prosecuted.
- The following summer, when he marched with Missouri NARAL in a suburban 4th of July parade, police manhandled him in an attempt to remove him from the procession. Though the police allowed Baton Bob to remain in the parade, the incident prompted a complaint that alleged the police also swore and called him names.
- Later the same summer, Baton Bob was arrested while participating in a Kerry/Edwards rally at St. Louis Union Station. He swore at a police officer who stepped on the train of Bob's $500 wedding dress, prompting an arrest for trespassing. The arrest proved to be the proverbial last straw, as Baton Bob left St. Louis for Atlanta soon thereafter.

== Performances ==
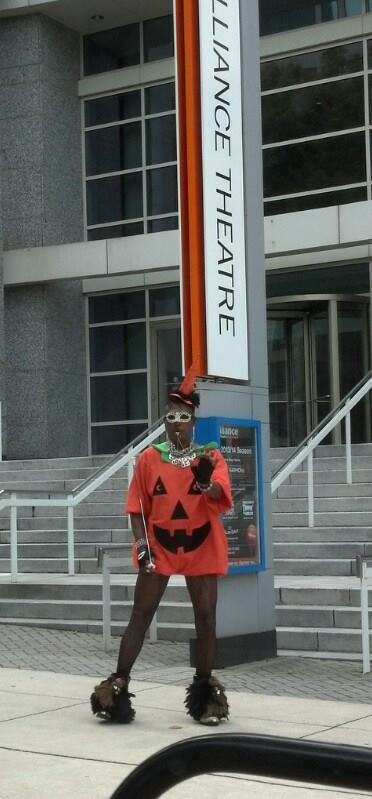
Baton Bob in Midtown, Atlanta celebrating Halloween on Peachtree street.

Baton Bob usually marches solo in a tutu, though he also wears thigh-revealing miniskirts, leotards, and occasionally a wedding dress. Often a whistle complements the ensemble, which can confuse and disturb motorists who sometimes assume a policeman is nearby giving directions. When actor Christopher Reeve died, Baton Bob wore a Superman costume in tribute, though he has also dressed as Superwoman and Spider-Man. Other costumes include a majorette's uniform and an Indian headdress. In St. Louis he typically marched down city streets and sidewalks (centering on the Central West End) and occasionally participated in parades. In Atlanta he frequently performs at and around Piedmont Park.

He was featured in Atlanta magazine as one of the city's top personalities and was in an ad campaign for the Georgia Aquarium. In June 2006, he appeared in The Comedy of Errors for the Georgia Shakespeare Festival. He led the parade of performers at the beginning of the play and entertained the crowd for half an hour before the show. Baton Bob has most recently appeared in the pilot episode of Laugh Out, a gay-themed comedy. He also made a guest appearance in Atlanta's production of the play Peachtree Battle to benefit Atlanta's Human Rights Campaign chapter. Recently he was featured in a video on CNN's website, a seven-minute piece produced by TBS-Storyline's Eric Lanford.

In 2007, he participated in a fashion show in Atlanta at Grady High School during Atlanta Fashion Week. The line was titled "Pecan Pie Couture" by designer Clint Ziegler, as a benefit of the high school's "UrbanCouture" fashion design program, and featured many southern inspired designs, which Baton Bob was proud to help show off.

He appeared on the cover of Creative Loafing's May 24–30 issue: "Hunting for Atlanta's Treasures SUMMER GUIDE '07," to honor the character. The same year, he was selected "grand marshal" of the Inman Park Festival Parade. In Creative Loafing's "BEST OF ATLANTA 2007", he was voted best in three categories: Best Local Hero, Best Local Celebrity and Best Street Character.

In 2008, he was selected by 10Best.com Travel Guides as one of the Atlanta Colorful Characters He was a 2008 10Best Bet award winners.

During January 2008, he participated in the "Doggies on the Catwalk", a pet fashion show at Grady High School. The event was produced by Grady's fashion program Urban Couture, featuring other local celebs with their pets, as a benefit for Pets Are Loving Support.

He participated in the official opening reception for the 2008 Special Events Tradeshow held at The World Of Coke Pavilon. He has presided as Master Of Ceremonies for radio station 99X's "2008 Mardi Gras Ball" at Club OPERA. In June 2008, he was featured on Revision3's Internet Superstar.

At 5:06 PM, on November 6, 2013, he twirled his way through a reporter's live WSB-TV appearance.

== 2013 arrest and eventual marriage ==
On June 26, 2013, in the wake of several Supreme Court decisions that favored same sex marriage, Baton Bob performed in a wedding dress in Midtown Atlanta. Several police officers asked him to leave, and he refused, allegedly kicking one of the officers. According to Baton Bob, an officer then logged on to Baton Bob's Facebook account and posted a pro-police message reading, in part, "I want to verify, that the Atlanta police was respectful to me considering the circumstances". The charges were later dismissed, and the officer who posted the message resigned; his lieutenant was disciplined for "violating the responsibilities of a supervisor".

Baton Bob filed a federal civil rights lawsuit against the city. Although the city released a statement calling Baton Bob's claims "baseless", they offered a $20,000 settlement.

On June 26, 2015, two years to the day after the arrest, Baton Bob married local chef Gary Bender in a ceremony that had been long planned for that day. Their wedding happened to fall on the same date that the Supreme Court announced its decision legalizing same-sex marriage nationwide.
