= Baton Rouge, South Carolina =

Settlement in South Carolina, United States

Coordinates: 34°41′49″N 81°20′38″W

Baton Rouge is an unincorporated community in Chester County, in the U.S. state of South Carolina.

== History ==
The community was named for a red pole (French: baton rouge) which marked the frontier between Indian lands and colonial lands. A variant name is "Batonrouge".
