= Terry Batt =

Australian artist and sculptor

- Born: 1949 (age 76–77); Bristol, United Kingdom
- Education: Massachusetts College of Art, Boston
- Known for: Painting, sculpture

Terry Batt is an Australian artist and sculptor.

== Biography ==
Terry Batt was born in Bristol, England and emigrated to Australia as a young child. He completed a Diploma of Visual Arts in 1977 at the Massachusetts College of Art & Design in Boston, followed by a Graduate Diploma in 1980 and a Master of Fine Art in 1982. He was appointed associate professor in Fine Art at the Royal Melbourne Institute of Technology, Melbourne in 1995 and was head of the graduate programme in Hong Kong until 2010. Batt lives and works in Melbourne.

== Exhibitions ==
Batt began exhibiting in 1974 at the Leveson Gallery, Melbourne and has continued to exhibit regularly, participating in over 40 solo and group shows. Since 1986 he has been exhibiting at Niagara Galleries, Melbourne, with his most recent show, A Delicate Balance, taking place in 2011. Batt has shown his work extensively in Australia, exhibiting at Michael Nagy Fine Art and DC-ART in Sydney, as well as internationally, with shows at the John Batten Gallery and 10 Chancery Lane Gallery in Hong Kong, Waikato Museum in Hamilton, New Zealand and various galleries in Boston, during his days as a student at the Massachusetts College of Art & Design.

Batt has also been included in various Australian and international art fairs, such as the Melbourne Art Fair in 2010 and 2006 and the Australian Contemporary Art Fair in 2002, 1994, 1992 and 1988. Batt showed at the Korea International Art Fair at the COEX Convention & Exhibition Center in Seoul in 2010 and the Gong Ju National Art Festival at the Lim Lip Museum, South Korea in 2006.

In 2002 Batt undertook a residency at the Ernst-Mach Foundation in France, where he produced a number of paintings and sculptures that were included as part of his Point of No Return exhibition at Niagara Galleries.

== Painting ==
Batt's studio practice includes both painting and sculpture. His paintings act as visual puns, a humorous and autobiographical take on order and rationality in the late twentieth century. His work is informed by an American lineage of art making and the influence from American pop and folk art are apparent in his classic cars, big cities and wild west pop romanticism. His paintings are curious figurative tableaus, where absurd figures interact and perform.

== Sculpture ==
His sculptural work features constructed wood or cast bronze characters. These figures have been released from his canvases and appear in real space. As with the paintings, they are a combination of surreal, naïve and primitive aesthetics. Stripes cover the surface of the sculpture in a collision of modernist painting and animal camouflage. Moving parts are incorporated with the use of small solar panels. The sun supporting new media.

== Collections ==
Batt's work is represented in the permanent collections of major Australian galleries such as the National Gallery of Australia, Canberra and the National Gallery of Victoria, Melbourne, and numerous state, regional and university collections, such as the Ballarat Fine Art Gallery, Bendigo Art Gallery, Latrobe Valley Arts Centre, Victoria, Dobell Foundation, Sydney, Gold Coast City Art Gallery, Queensland and the RMIT Collection, Melbourne. His work is also featured internationally in the Chartwell Collection in the Auckland Art Gallery, New Zealand and Lim Lip Museum, South Korea.
