= Saint-Augustin, Seine-et-Marne =

Saint-Augustin
- Commune
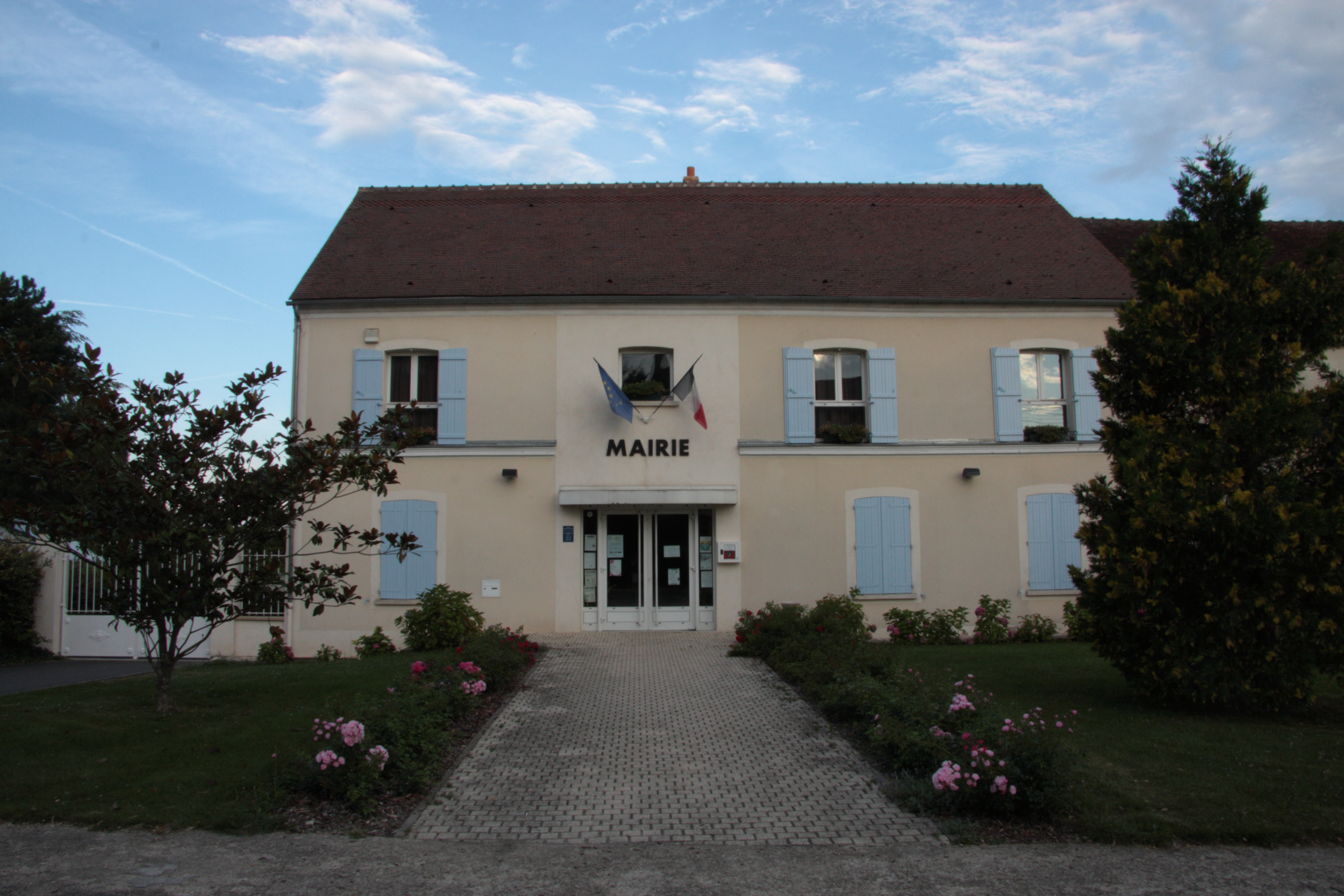
- The town hall in Saint-Augustin

- Coat of arms
- Location of Saint-Augustin
- Location within France Location within Île-de-France (region)
- Coordinates: 48°47′07″N 3°01′51″E
- Country: France
- Region: Île-de-France
- Department: Seine-et-Marne
- Arrondissement: Meaux
- Canton: Coulommiers
- Intercommunality: CA Coulommiers Pays de Brie

Government
  - Mayor (2020–2026): Sébastien Houdayer
- Area^{1}: 10.37 km^{2} (4.00 sq mi)
- Highest elevation: 152 m (499 ft)
- Lowest elevation: 69 m (226 ft)
- Population (2023): 1,888
  - Density: 182.1/km^{2} (471.5/sq mi)
- Time zone: UTC+01:00 (CET)
  - Summer (DST): UTC+02:00 (CEST)
- INSEE/Postal code: 77400 /77515
- ^{1} French Land Register data, which excludes lakes, ponds, glaciers > 1 km^{2} (0.386 sq mi or 247 acres) and river estuaries.

Saint-Augustin (French pronunciation: [sɛ̃.t‿oɡystɛ̃]) is a commune in the Seine-et-Marne department in the Île-de-France region in north-central France.

== Geography ==
The river Aubetin flows northward through the commune.

== Demographics ==
Inhabitants of Saint-Augustin are called Saint-Augustinois.

== See also ==
- Communes of the Seine-et-Marne department
