= USC&GS Baton Rouge =

Survey ship

History

United States
- Name: Baton Rouge
- Namesake: Baton Rouge, Louisiana
- Builder: S.D. Bardmore, Louisville, Kentucky
- Completed: 1875
- Commissioned: 1875
- Fate: Sank 26 December 1880; Raised and sold 1881

General characteristics
- Type: Survey ship
- Length: 95 ft (29 m)
- Beam: 20 ft (6.1 m)
- Draft: 4 ft (1.2 m)
- Propulsion: Steam engine, stern wheel

USCS Baton Rouge, later USC&GS Baton Rouge, was a stern-wheel steamer that served as a survey ship in the United States Coast Survey from 1875 to 1878 and in the United States Coast and Geodetic Survey from 1878 to 1880.

Baton Rouge was built for the Coast Survey by S.D. Bardmore at Louisville, Kentucky, and entered service in 1875. In 1878, the Coast Survey was renamed the U.S. Coast and Geodetic Survey.

Baton Rouge sank in the Mississippi River on 26 December 1880. She apparently was raised and sold in 1881.
