= Batong =

Batong may refer to:

- Batong Line, Beijing Subway, in China
- Batong, Rueso, a sub-District (tambon) in Rueso District (Amphoe) of Thailand
- Kampong Batong, village in Brunei
