= Angostura River =

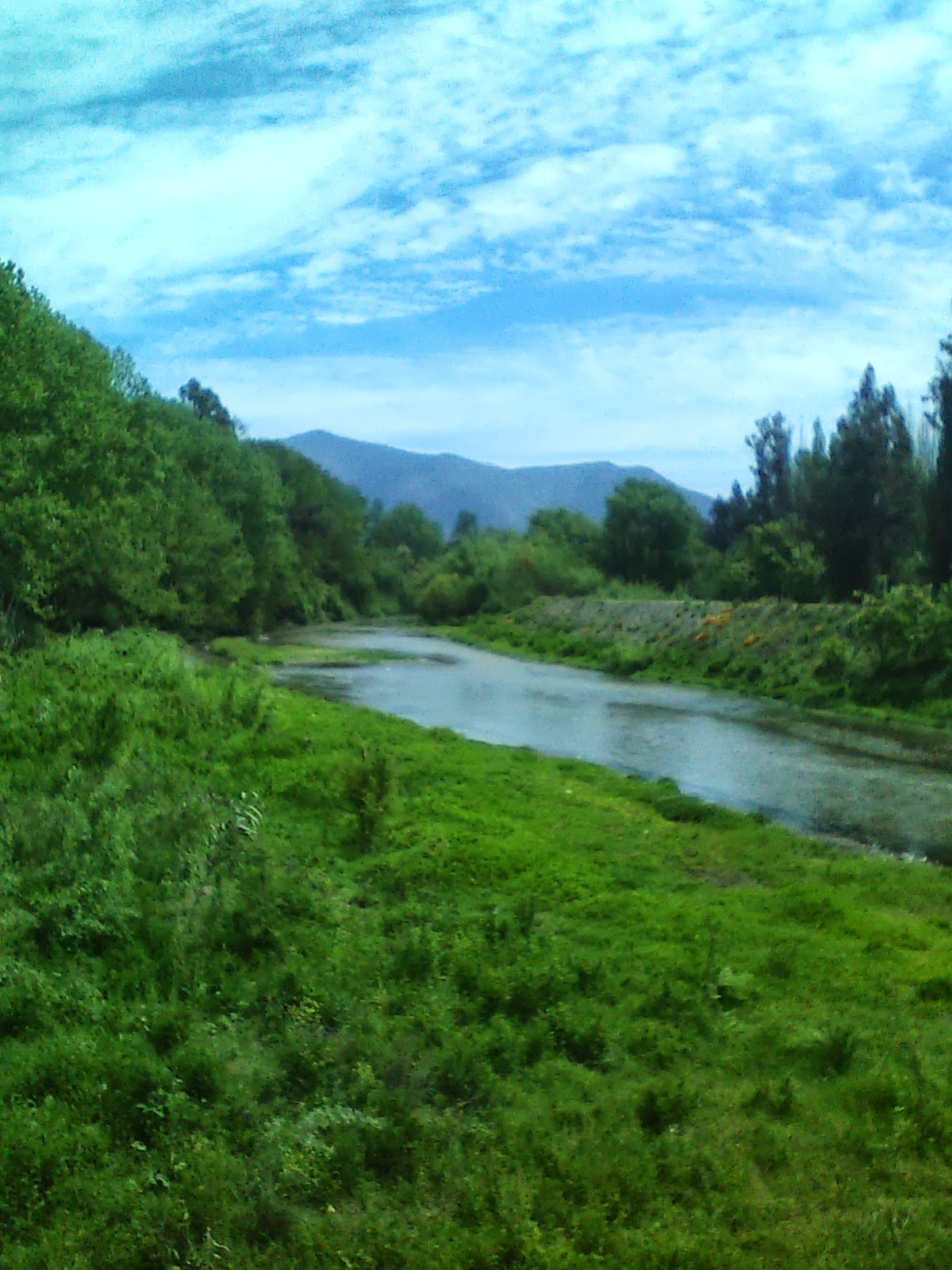

Location
- Country: Chile

Physical characteristics
- Mouth: Maipo River
  - coordinates: 33°48′19″S 70°53′51″W

The Angostura River is a river of Chile.

== See also ==
- List of rivers of Chile
