= Grand Morin =

River in France

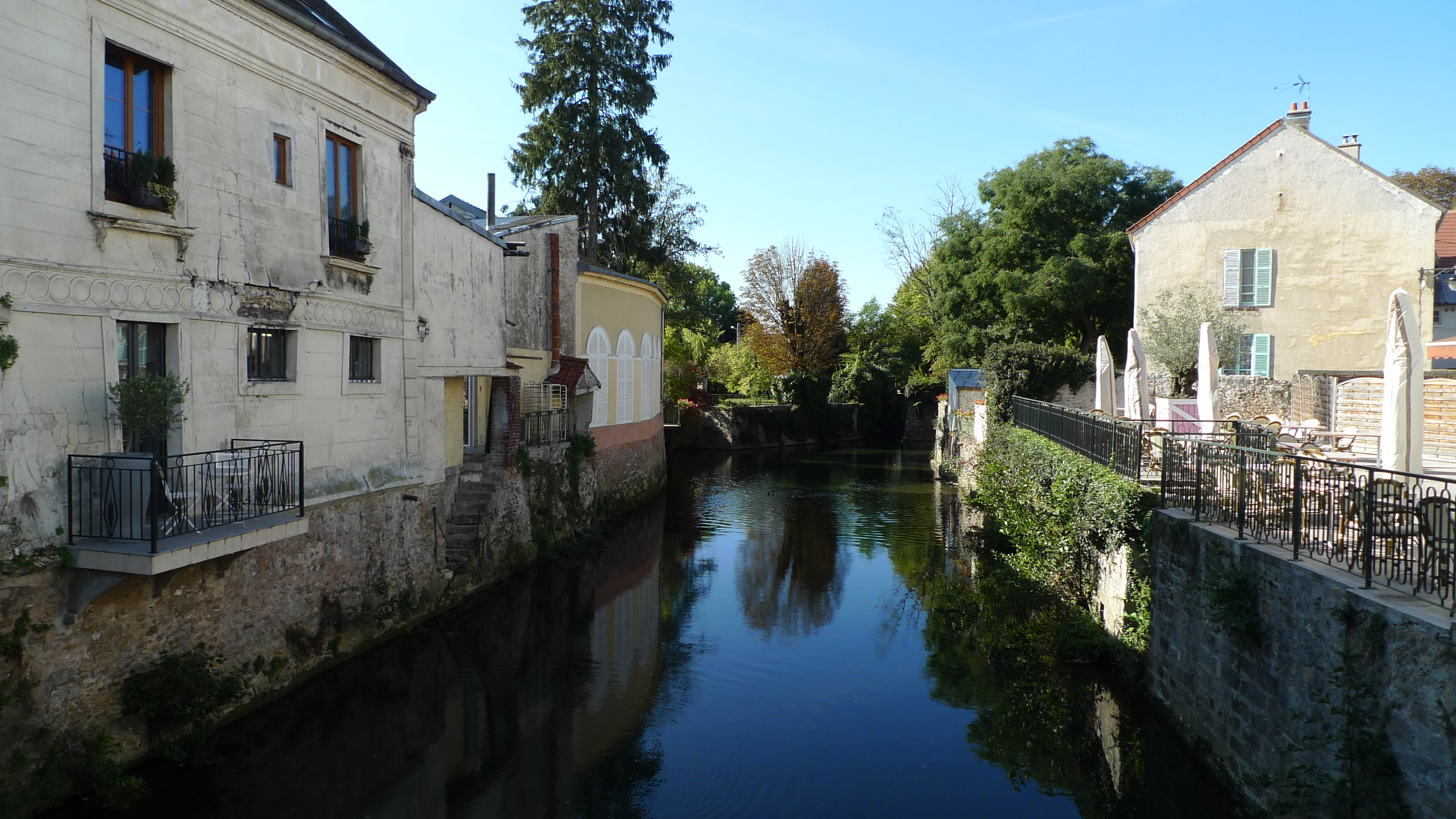

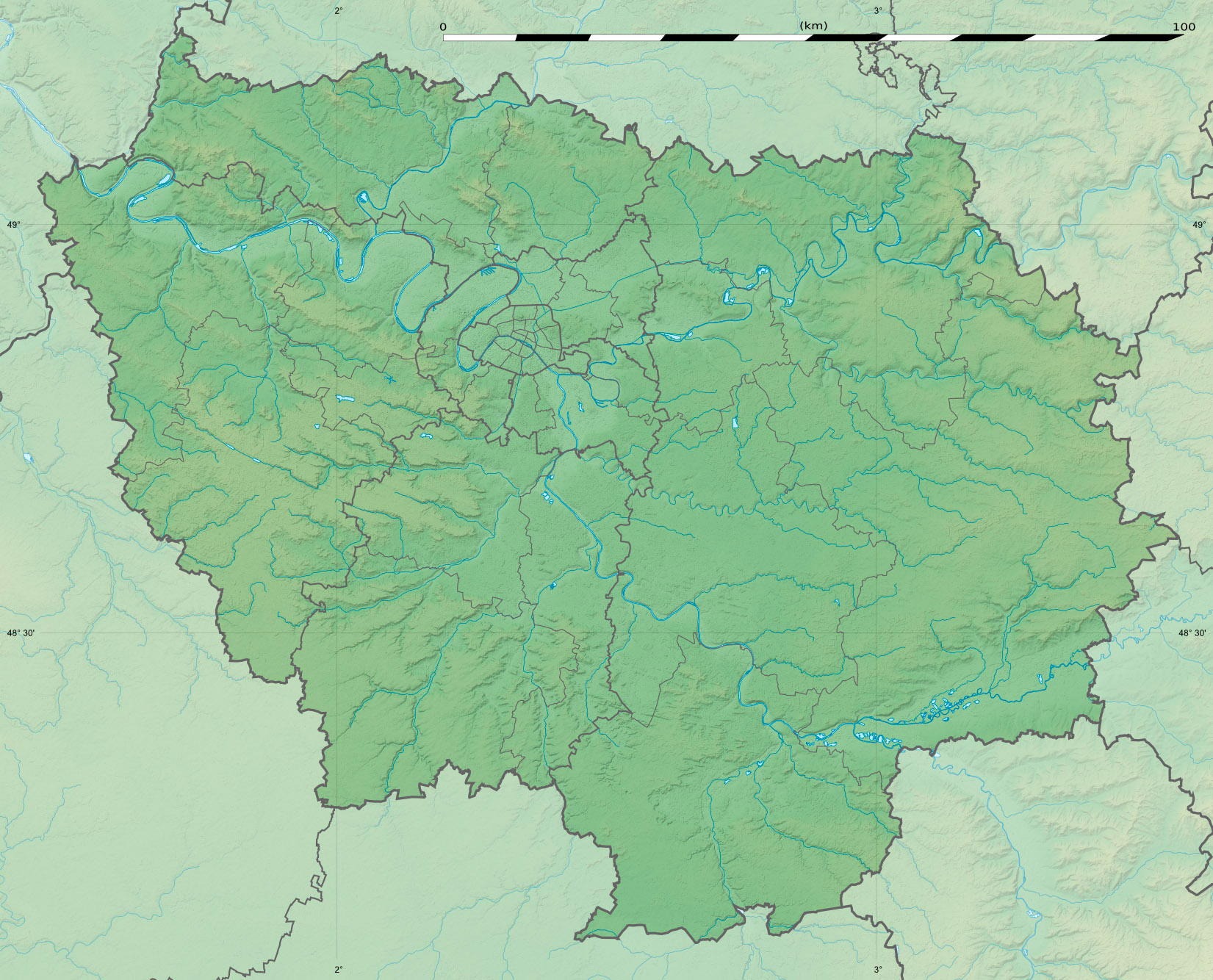
- Location within France Location within Île-de-France (region)

Location
- Country: France

Physical characteristics
- Source
  - location: Champagne
- Mouth
  - location: Marne
  - coordinates: 48°54′1″N 2°49′50″E
- Length: 118 km (73 mi)
- Basin size: 1,180 km^{2} (460 mi^{2})

Basin features
- Progression: Marne→ Seine→ English Channel

The Grand Morin (French pronunciation: [ɡʁɑ̃ mɔʁɛ̃]; lit. 'Great Morin') is a 118-kilometre (73 mi) long river in France, left tributary of the Marne. Its source is near the village of Lachy. Its course crosses the departments of Marne and Seine-et-Marne. It flows westwards through the towns of Esternay, La Ferté-Gaucher, Coulommiers and Crécy-la-Chapelle, finally flowing into the Marne in Esbly.

Its main tributary is the Aubetin.
