= Canton of Rebais =

Coordinates: 48°52′00″N 3°16′09″E

Rebais
- Former canton
- Interactive map of Rebais
- Country: France
- Region: Île-de-France
- Department: Seine-et-Marne
- No. of communes: {{{nbcomm}}}
- Disbanded: 2015
- Area: 198.87 km^{2} (76.78 sq mi)
- Population (2012): 13,674
  - Density: 68.758/km^{2} (178.08/sq mi)

The canton of Rebais is a French former administrative division, located in the arrondissement of Provins, in the Seine-et-Marne département (Île-de-France région). It was disbanded following the French canton reorganisation which came into effect in March 2015. It consisted of 18 communes, which joined the canton of Coulommiers in 2015.

== Demographics ==
Historical population
Year	Pop.	±%
1999	12,262	—
2006	13,087	+6.7%
2012	13,674	+4.5%

== Composition ==
The canton of Rebais was composed of 18 communes:

- Bellot
- Boitron
- Chauffry
- Doue
- Hondevilliers
- Montdauphin
- Montenils
- Orly-sur-Morin
- Rebais
- Sablonnières
- Saint-Cyr-sur-Morin
- Saint-Denis-lès-Rebais
- Saint-Germain-sous-Doue
- Saint-Léger
- Saint-Ouen-sur-Morin
- La Trétoire
- Verdelot
- Villeneuve-sur-Bellot

== See also ==
- Cantons of the Seine-et-Marne department
- Communes of the Seine-et-Marne department
