= Canton of La Ferté-Gaucher =

Coordinates: 48°46′12″N 3°16′50″E

La Ferté-Gaucher
- Former canton
- Interactive map of La Ferté-Gaucher
- Country: France
- Region: Île-de-France
- Department: Seine-et-Marne
- No. of communes: {{{nbcomm}}}
- Disbanded: 2015
- Area: 249.74 km^{2} (96.43 sq mi)
- Population (2012): 16,185
  - Density: 64.807/km^{2} (167.85/sq mi)

The canton of La Ferté-Gaucher is a French former administrative division, located in the arrondissement of Provins, in the Seine-et-Marne département (Île-de-France région). It was disbanded following the French canton reorganisation which came into effect in March 2015. It consisted of 18 communes, which joined the canton of Coulommiers in 2015.

== Demographics ==
Historical population
Year	Pop.	±%
1999	13,880	—
2006	14,857	+7.0%
2012	16,185	+8.9%

== Composition ==
The canton of La Ferté-Gaucher was composed of 18 communes:

- Amillis
- La Chapelle-Moutils
- Chartronges
- Chevru
- Choisy-en-Brie
- Dagny
- La Ferté-Gaucher
- Jouy-sur-Morin
- Lescherolles
- Leudon-en-Brie
- Marolles-en-Brie
- Meilleray
- Montolivet
- Saint-Barthélemy
- Saint-Mars-Vieux-Maisons
- Saint-Martin-des-Champs
- Saint-Rémy-la-Vanne
- Saint-Siméon

== See also ==
- Cantons of the Seine-et-Marne department
- Communes of the Seine-et-Marne department
