= Boitron =

Boitron may refer to:

- Boitron, a commune of the Orne department in France
- Boitron, a commune of the Seine-et-Marne department in France
