= Villeneuvois =

Villeneuvois may refer to:

- Villeneuve-les-Bordes commune inhabitants
- Villeneuve-Saint-Denis inhabitants
- Villeneuve-sous-Dammartin inhabitants
- Villeneuve-sur-Bellot inhabitants
