= Saint-Germain-sous-Doue =

- Commune
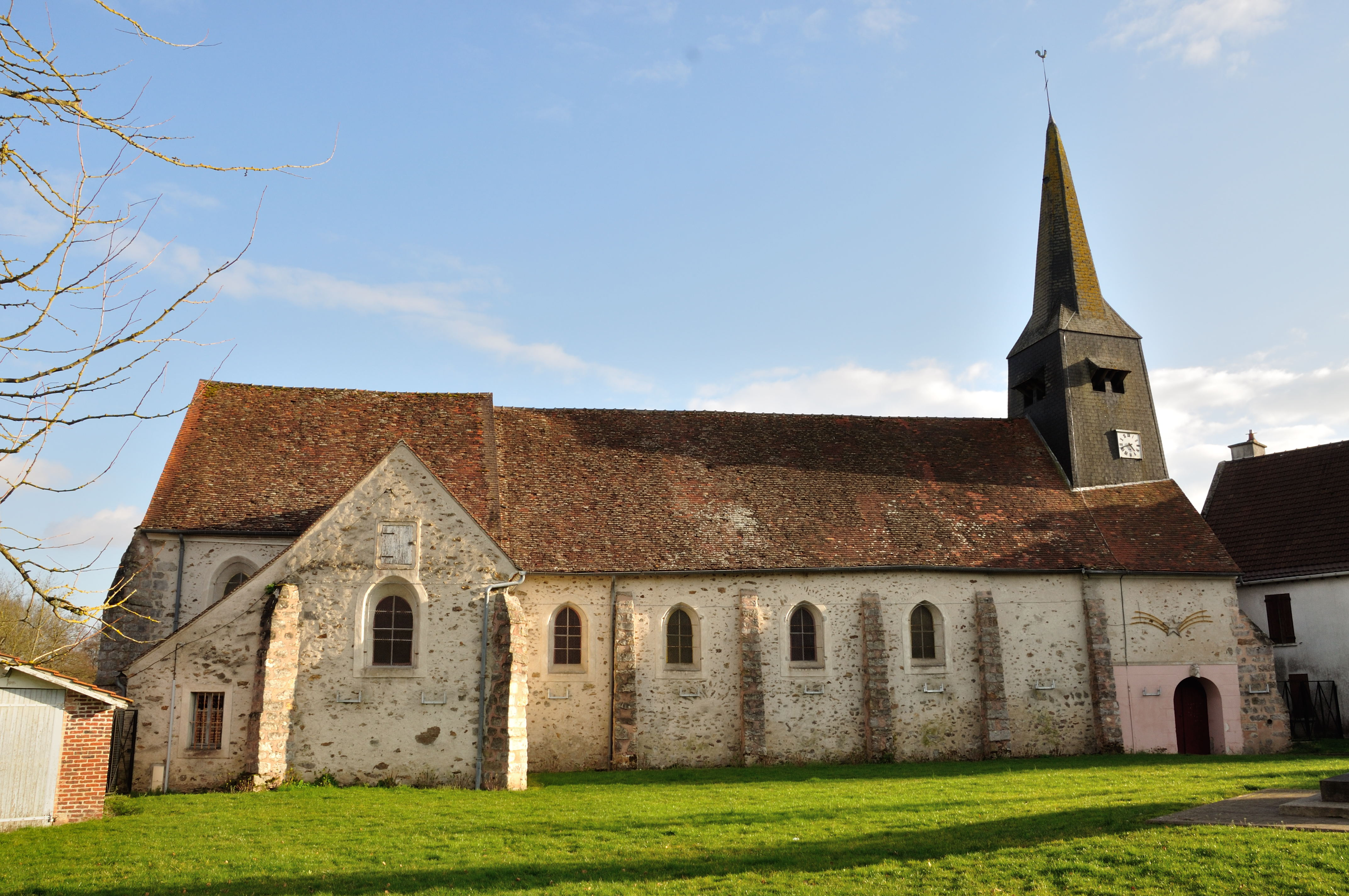
- The church in Saint-Germain-sous-Doue
- Location of Saint-Germain-sous-Doue
- Location within France Location within Île-de-France (region)
- Coordinates: 48°51′10″N 3°08′40″E
- Country: France
- Region: Île-de-France
- Department: Seine-et-Marne
- Arrondissement: Provins
- Canton: Coulommiers

Government
  - Mayor (2020–2026): Yvan Sevestre
- Area^{1}: 10.01 km^{2} (3.86 sq mi)
- Highest elevation: 161 m (528 ft)
- Lowest elevation: 106 m (348 ft)
- Population (2023): 549
  - Density: 54.8/km^{2} (142/sq mi)
- Time zone: UTC+01:00 (CET)
  - Summer (DST): UTC+02:00 (CEST)
- INSEE/Postal code: 77411 /77169
- ^{1} French Land Register data, which excludes lakes, ponds, glaciers > 1 km^{2} (0.386 sq mi or 247 acres) and river estuaries.

Saint-Germain-sous-Doue (French pronunciation: [sɛ̃ ʒɛʁmɛ̃ su du], literally Saint-Germain under Doue) is a commune in the Seine-et-Marne department in the Île-de-France region in north-central France.

== Demographics ==
Inhabitants of Saint-Germain-sous-Doue are called Germinois.

== See also ==
- Communes of the Seine-et-Marne department
