= Hautefeuille =

- Commune
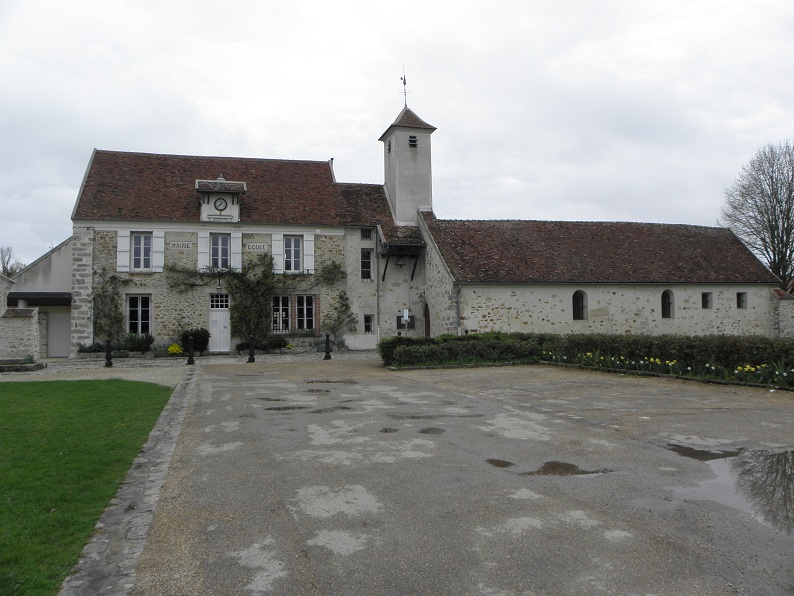
- The town hall and church in Hautefeuille
- Location of Hautefeuille
- Location within France Location within Île-de-France (region)
- Coordinates: 48°45′58″N 2°58′06″E
- Country: France
- Region: Île-de-France
- Department: Seine-et-Marne
- Arrondissement: Meaux
- Canton: Coulommiers
- Intercommunality: CA Coulommiers Pays de Brie

Government
  - Mayor (2020–2026): Joël Chauvin
- Area^{1}: 9.80 km^{2} (3.78 sq mi)
- Highest elevation: 126 m (413 ft)
- Lowest elevation: 111 m (364 ft)
- Population (2023): 253
  - Density: 25.8/km^{2} (66.9/sq mi)
- Time zone: UTC+01:00 (CET)
  - Summer (DST): UTC+02:00 (CEST)
- INSEE/Postal code: 77224 /77515
- ^{1} French Land Register data, which excludes lakes, ponds, glaciers > 1 km^{2} (0.386 sq mi or 247 acres) and river estuaries.

Hautefeuille (French pronunciation: [otfœj]) is a commune in the Seine-et-Marne département in the Île-de-France region in north-central France.

== Demographics ==
Inhabitants are called Hautefeuillois.

== See also ==
- Communes of the Seine-et-Marne department
