= Boissy-le-Châtel =

- Commune
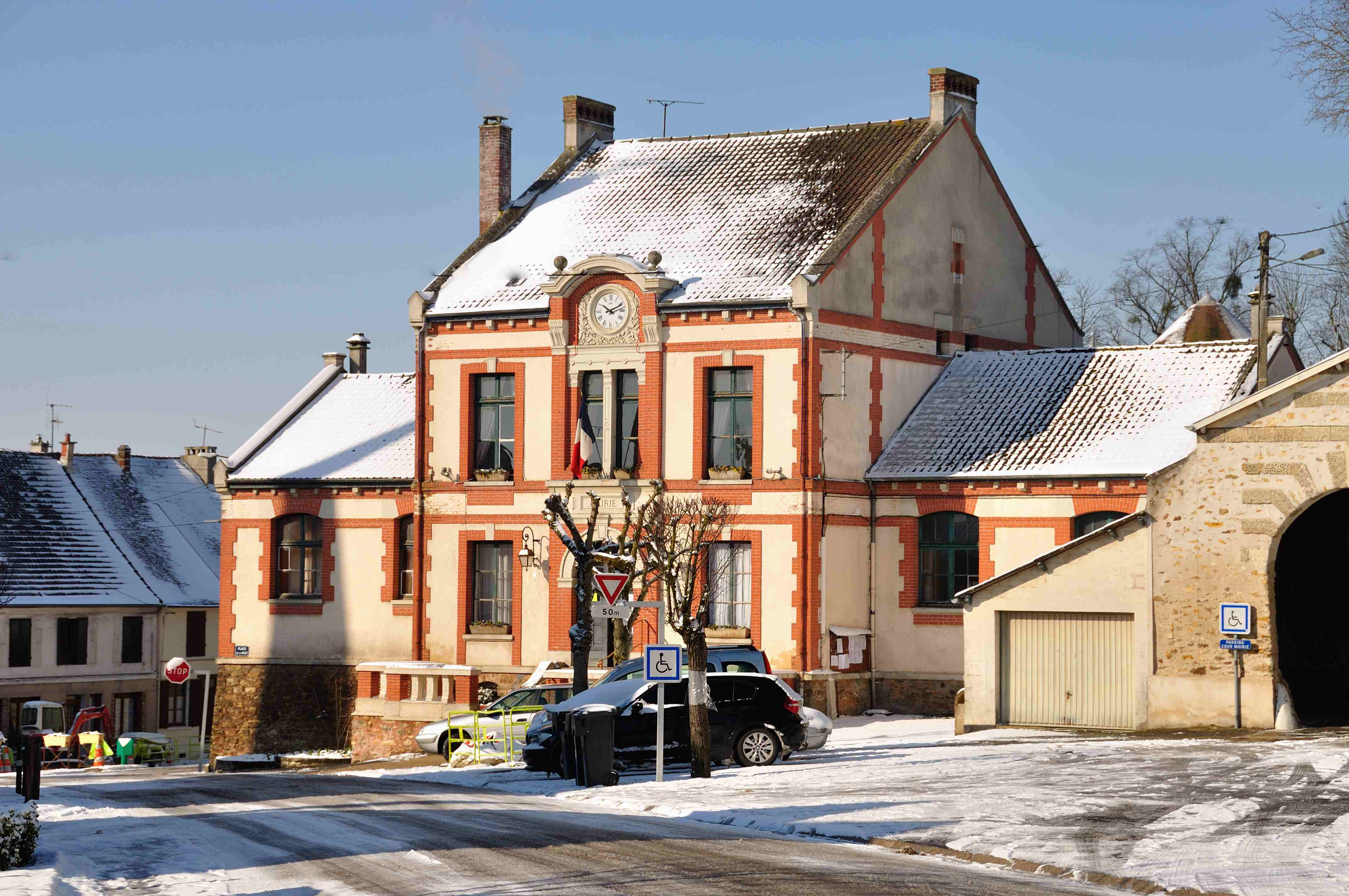
- The town hall in Boissy-le-Châtel

- Coat of arms
- Location of Boissy-le-Châtel
- Location within France Location within Île-de-France (region)
- Coordinates: 48°49′15″N 3°08′19″E
- Country: France
- Region: Île-de-France
- Department: Seine-et-Marne
- Arrondissement: Meaux
- Canton: Coulommiers
- Intercommunality: CA Coulommiers Pays de Brie

Government
  - Mayor (2020–2026): Guy Dhorbait
- Area^{1}: 9.95 km^{2} (3.84 sq mi)
- Highest elevation: 150 m (490 ft)
- Lowest elevation: 72 m (236 ft)
- Population (2023): 3,346
  - Density: 336/km^{2} (871/sq mi)
- Time zone: UTC+01:00 (CET)
  - Summer (DST): UTC+02:00 (CEST)
- INSEE/Postal code: 77042 /77169
- ^{1} French Land Register data, which excludes lakes, ponds, glaciers > 1 km^{2} (0.386 sq mi or 247 acres) and river estuaries.

Boissy-le-Châtel (French: [bwasi lə ʃɑtɛl]) is a commune in the Seine-et-Marne department in the Île-de-France region in north-central France.

== Population ==
Historical population
| Year | Pop. | ±% p.a. |
|---|---|---|
| 1968 | 1,284 | — |
| 1975 | 1,393 | +1.17% |
| 1982 | 1,725 | +3.10% |
| 1990 | 2,366 | +4.03% |
| 1999 | 2,661 | +1.31% |
| 2007 | 3,028 | +1.63% |
| 2012 | 3,114 | +0.56% |
| 2017 | 3,151 | +0.24% |
| 2023 | 3,346 | +1.01% |
Source: INSEE

The inhabitants are called Buccéens in French.

== Economy ==
- Paper mill

== See also ==
- Communes of the Seine-et-Marne department
