= Aulnoy, Seine-et-Marne =

Aulnoy
- Commune
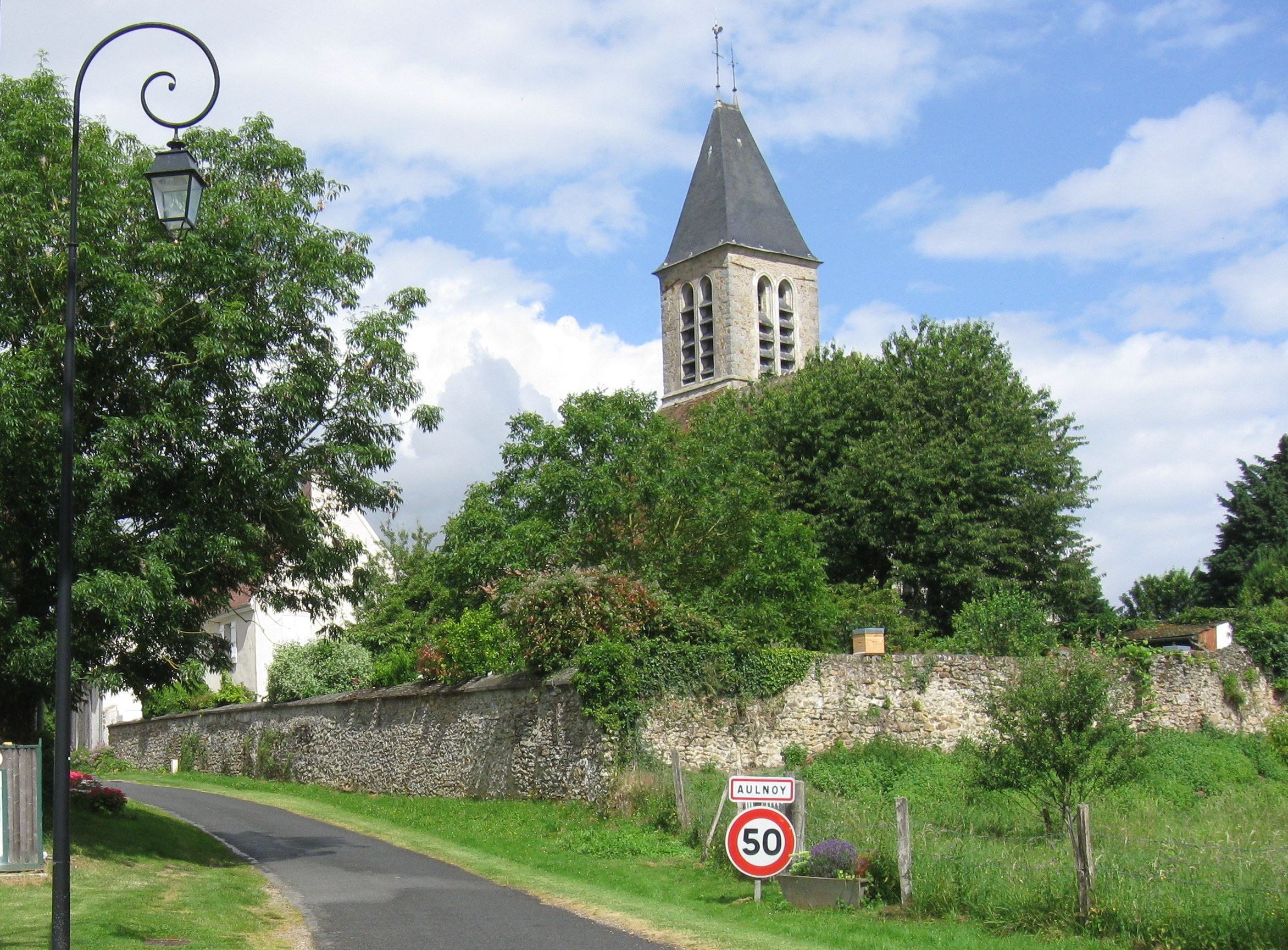
- The road into Aulnoy
- Location of Aulnoy
- Location within France Location within Île-de-France (region)
- Coordinates: 48°50′30″N 3°05′46″E
- Country: France
- Region: Île-de-France
- Department: Seine-et-Marne
- Arrondissement: Meaux
- Canton: Coulommiers
- Intercommunality: CA Coulommiers Pays de Brie

Government
  - Mayor (2020–2026): Éric Gobard
- Area^{1}: 15.00 km^{2} (5.79 sq mi)
- Highest elevation: 149 m (489 ft)
- Lowest elevation: 84 m (276 ft)
- Population (2023): 362
  - Density: 24.1/km^{2} (62.5/sq mi)
- Time zone: UTC+01:00 (CET)
  - Summer (DST): UTC+02:00 (CEST)
- INSEE/Postal code: 77013 /77120
- ^{1} French Land Register data, which excludes lakes, ponds, glaciers > 1 km^{2} (0.386 sq mi or 247 acres) and river estuaries.

Aulnoy (French pronunciation: [o(l)nwa]) is a commune in the Seine-et-Marne department in the Île-de-France region in north-central France.

== Demographics ==
The inhabitants are called Alnaisiens.

== See also ==
- Communes of the Seine-et-Marne department
