= Giremoutiers =

- Commune
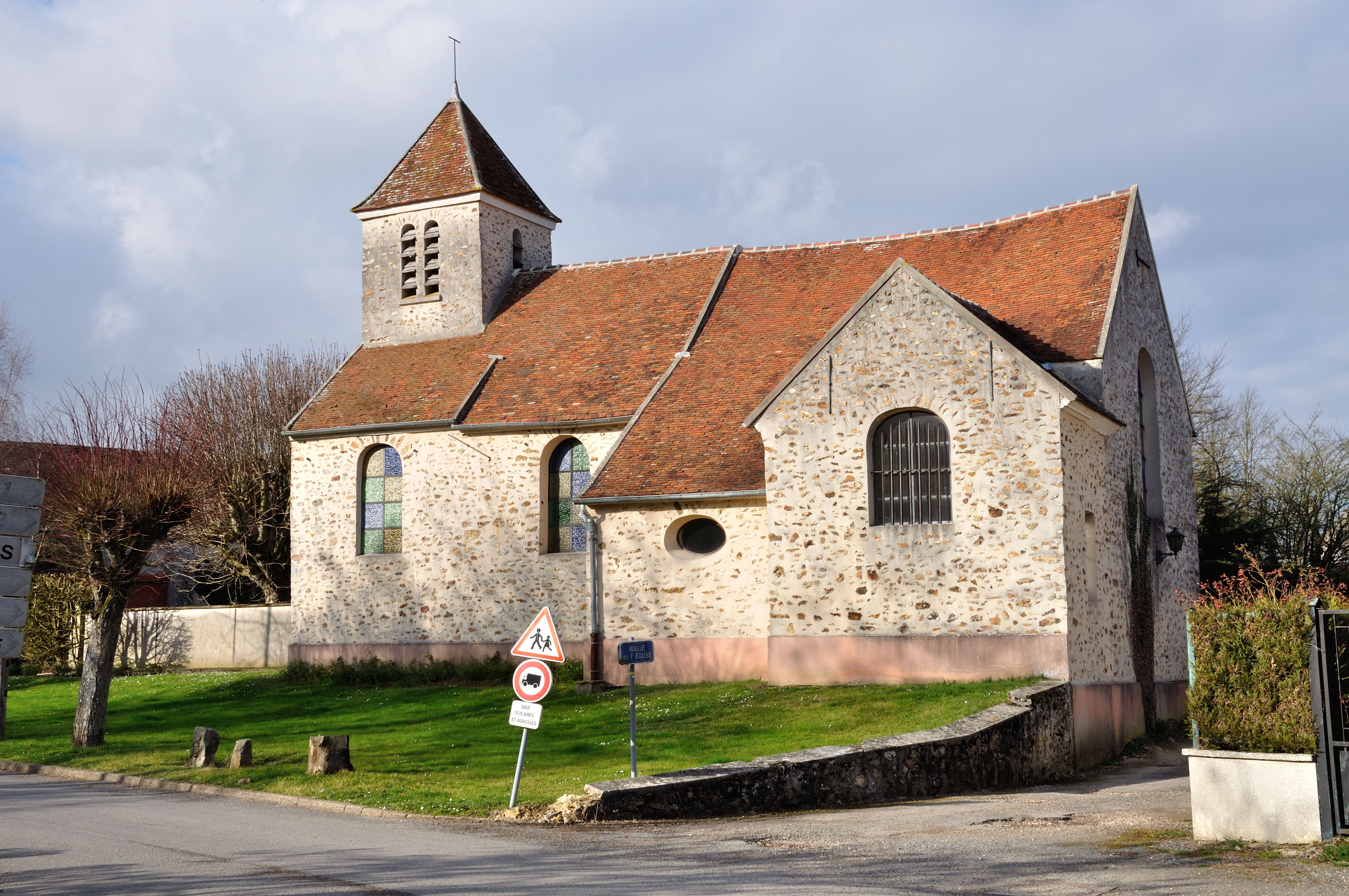
- The church in Giremoutiers
- Location of Giremoutiers
- Location within France Location within Île-de-France (region)
- Coordinates: 48°50′35″N 3°01′50″E
- Country: France
- Region: Île-de-France
- Department: Seine-et-Marne
- Arrondissement: Meaux
- Canton: Coulommiers
- Intercommunality: CA Coulommiers Pays de Brie

Government
  - Mayor (2020–2026): Yves Brodard
- Area^{1}: 6.01 km^{2} (2.32 sq mi)
- Highest elevation: 154 m (505 ft)
- Lowest elevation: 120 m (390 ft)
- Population (2023): 188
  - Density: 31.3/km^{2} (81.0/sq mi)
- Time zone: UTC+01:00 (CET)
  - Summer (DST): UTC+02:00 (CEST)
- INSEE/Postal code: 77206 /77120
- ^{1} French Land Register data, which excludes lakes, ponds, glaciers > 1 km^{2} (0.386 sq mi or 247 acres) and river estuaries.

Giremoutiers (French pronunciation: [ʒiʁmutje]) is a commune in the Seine-et-Marne département in the Île-de-France region in north-central France.

== Demographics ==
Inhabitants are called Giremontois.

== See also ==
- Communes of the Seine-et-Marne department
