= Pézarches =

- Commune
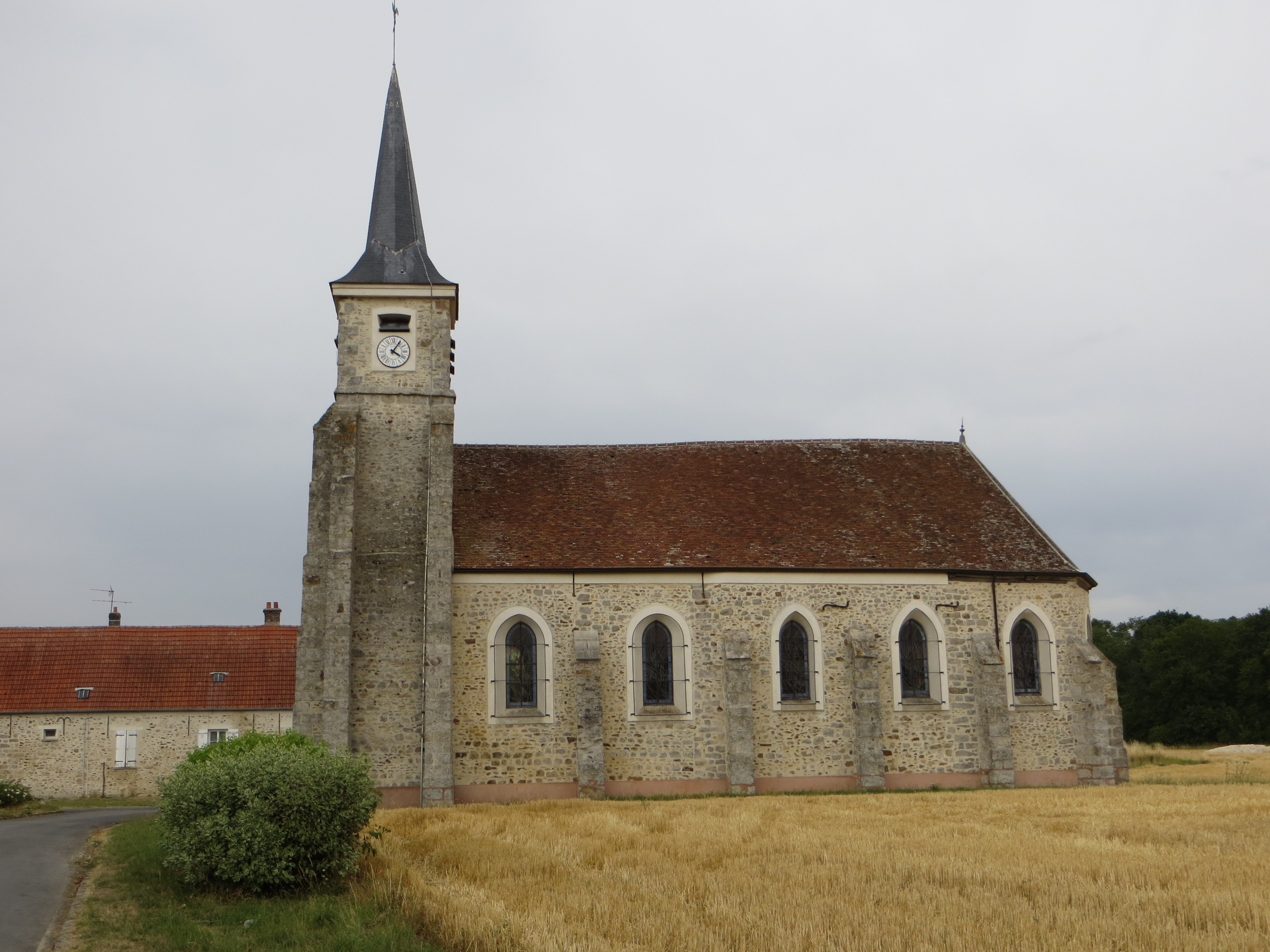
- The church in Pézarches

- Coat of arms
- Location of Pézarches
- Location within France Location within Île-de-France (region)
- Coordinates: 48°44′15″N 2°59′35″E
- Country: France
- Region: Île-de-France
- Department: Seine-et-Marne
- Arrondissement: Meaux
- Canton: Coulommiers
- Intercommunality: CA Coulommiers Pays de Brie

Government
  - Mayor (2020–2026): Alexandre Denamiel
- Area^{1}: 8.94 km^{2} (3.45 sq mi)
- Highest elevation: 139 m (456 ft)
- Lowest elevation: 107 m (351 ft)
- Population (2023): 410
  - Density: 46/km^{2} (120/sq mi)
- Time zone: UTC+01:00 (CET)
  - Summer (DST): UTC+02:00 (CEST)
- INSEE/Postal code: 77360 /77131
- ^{1} French Land Register data, which excludes lakes, ponds, glaciers > 1 km^{2} (0.386 sq mi or 247 acres) and river estuaries.

Pézarches (French pronunciation: [pezaʁʃ]) is a commune in the Seine-et-Marne department in the Île-de-France region in north-central France.

== Demographics ==
Inhabitants are called Pézarchois.

== See also ==
- Communes of the Seine-et-Marne department
