= Maisoncelles-en-Brie =

- Commune
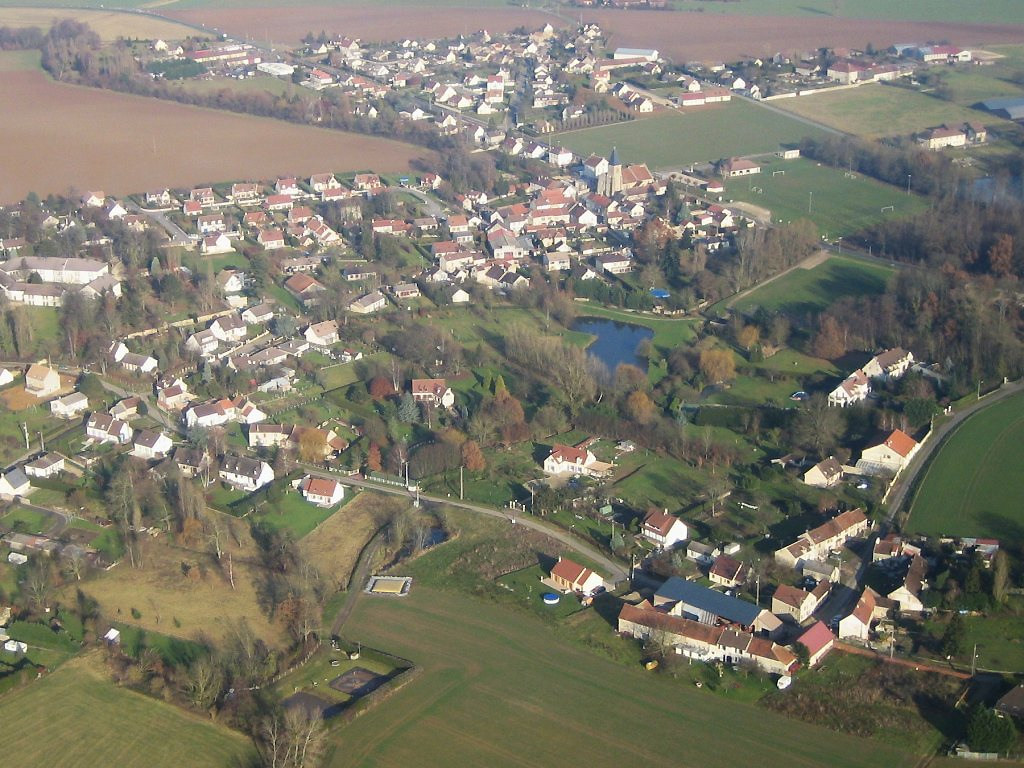
- A general view of Maisoncelles-en-Brie

- Coat of arms
- Location of Maisoncelles-en-Brie
- Location within France Location within Île-de-France (region)
- Coordinates: 48°51′48″N 2°59′32″E
- Country: France
- Region: Île-de-France
- Department: Seine-et-Marne
- Arrondissement: Meaux
- Canton: Coulommiers
- Intercommunality: CA Coulommiers Pays de Brie

Government
  - Mayor (2020–2026): Cédric Thomas
- Area^{1}: 13.57 km^{2} (5.24 sq mi)
- Highest elevation: 158 m (518 ft)
- Lowest elevation: 119 m (390 ft)
- Population (2023): 977
  - Density: 72.0/km^{2} (186/sq mi)
- Time zone: UTC+01:00 (CET)
  - Summer (DST): UTC+02:00 (CEST)
- INSEE/Postal code: 77270 /77580
- ^{1} French Land Register data, which excludes lakes, ponds, glaciers > 1 km^{2} (0.386 sq mi or 247 acres) and river estuaries.

Maisoncelles-en-Brie (French pronunciation: [mɛzɔ̃sɛl ɑ̃ bʁi], literally Maisoncelles in Brie) is a commune in the Seine-et-Marne département in the Île-de-France region in north-central France.

== Demographics ==
Inhabitants are called Maisoncellois.

== See also ==
- Communes of the Seine-et-Marne department
