= Mouroux =

- Commune
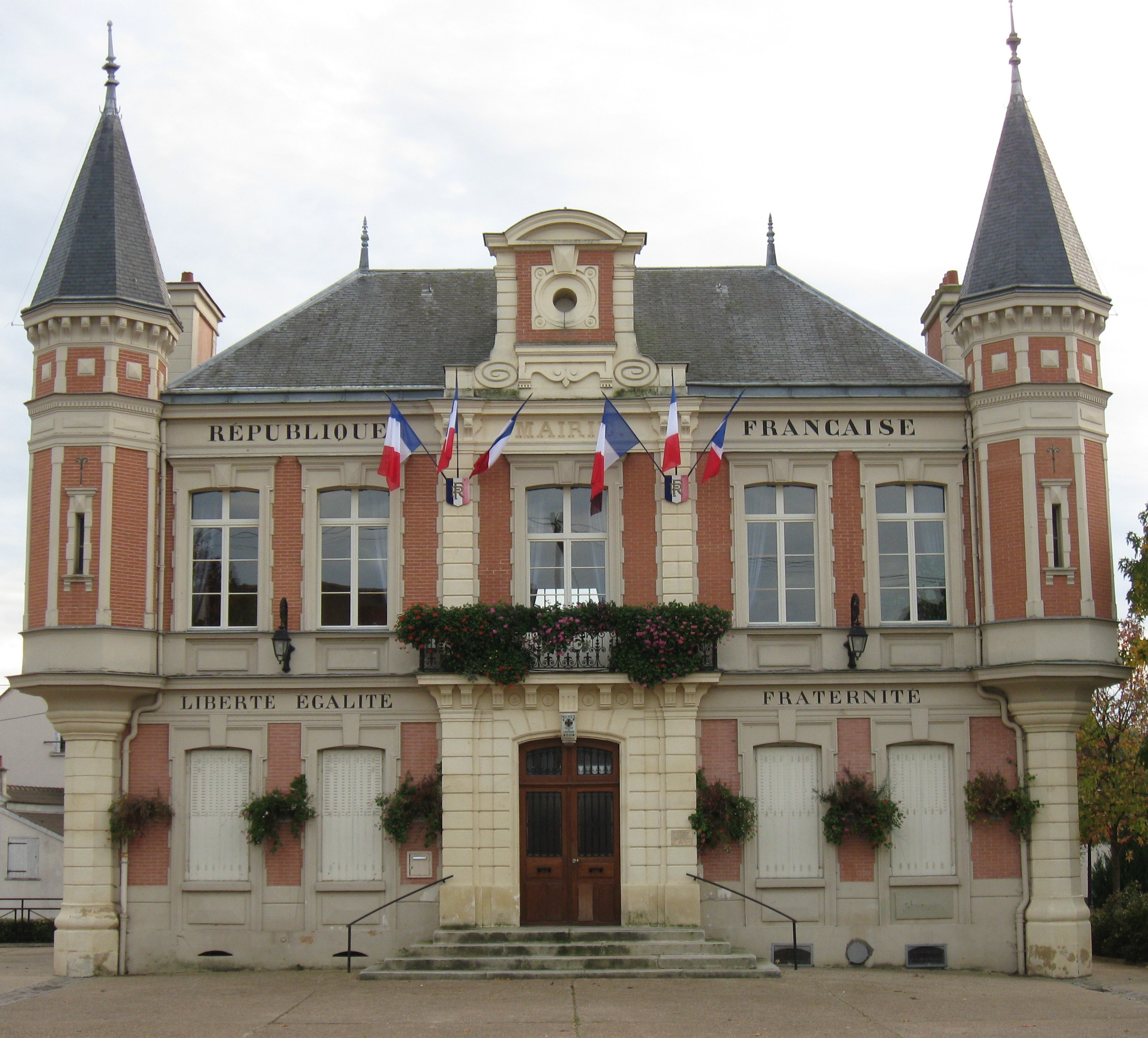
- The town hall in Mouroux

- Coat of arms
- Location of Mouroux
- Location within France Location within Île-de-France (region)
- Coordinates: 48°49′20″N 3°02′17″E
- Country: France
- Region: Île-de-France
- Department: Seine-et-Marne
- Arrondissement: Meaux
- Canton: Coulommiers
- Intercommunality: CA Coulommiers Pays de Brie

Government
  - Mayor (2024–2026): Jean-Louis Bogard
- Area^{1}: 16.77 km^{2} (6.47 sq mi)
- Highest elevation: 156 m (512 ft)
- Lowest elevation: 63 m (207 ft)
- Population (2023): 5,810
  - Density: 346/km^{2} (897/sq mi)
- Time zone: UTC+01:00 (CET)
  - Summer (DST): UTC+02:00 (CEST)
- INSEE/Postal code: 77320 /77120
- ^{1} French Land Register data, which excludes lakes, ponds, glaciers > 1 km^{2} (0.386 sq mi or 247 acres) and river estuaries.

Mouroux (French pronunciation: [muʁu]) is a commune in the Seine-et-Marne department in the Île-de-France region in north-central France.

== Demographics ==
The inhabitants are called Mourousiens in French.

Historical population
Year	Pop.	±% p.a.
1968	1,829	—
1975	2,246	+2.98%
1982	2,834	+3.38%
1990	3,594	+3.01%
1999	4,201	+1.75%
2007	4,671	+1.33%
2012	5,104	+1.79%
2017	5,491	+1.47%
2023	5,810	+0.95%
Source: INSEE

== See also ==
- Communes of the Seine-et-Marne department
