= Villeneuve-sur-Bellot =

- Commune
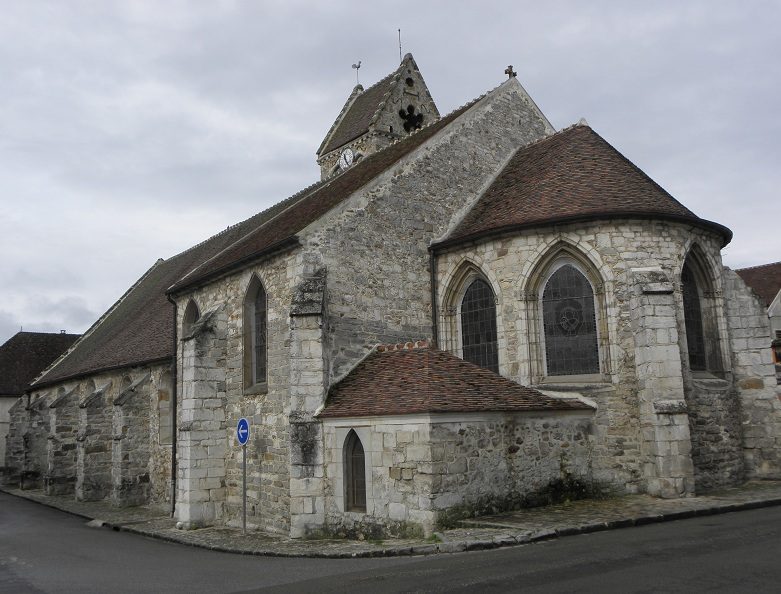
- The church in Villeneuve-sur-Bellot

- Coat of arms
- Location of Villeneuve-sur-Bellot
- Location within France Location within Île-de-France (region)
- Coordinates: 48°51′50″N 3°20′35″E
- Country: France
- Region: Île-de-France
- Department: Seine-et-Marne
- Arrondissement: Provins
- Canton: Coulommiers

Government
  - Mayor (2020–2026): Jean-Claude Laplaige
- Area^{1}: 9.52 km^{2} (3.68 sq mi)
- Highest elevation: 203 m (666 ft)
- Lowest elevation: 83 m (272 ft)
- Population (2023): 1,151
  - Density: 121/km^{2} (313/sq mi)
- Time zone: UTC+01:00 (CET)
  - Summer (DST): UTC+02:00 (CEST)
- INSEE/Postal code: 77512 /77510
- ^{1} French Land Register data, which excludes lakes, ponds, glaciers > 1 km^{2} (0.386 sq mi or 247 acres) and river estuaries.

Villeneuve-sur-Bellot (French pronunciation: [vilnœv syʁ bɛlo], literally Villeneuve on Bellot) is a commune in the Seine-et-Marne department in the Île-de-France region in north-central France.

== Demographics ==
Inhabitants of Villeneuve-sur-Bellot are called Villeneuvois.

== See also ==
- Communes of the Seine-et-Marne department
