= Saint-Ouen-sur-Morin =

- Commune
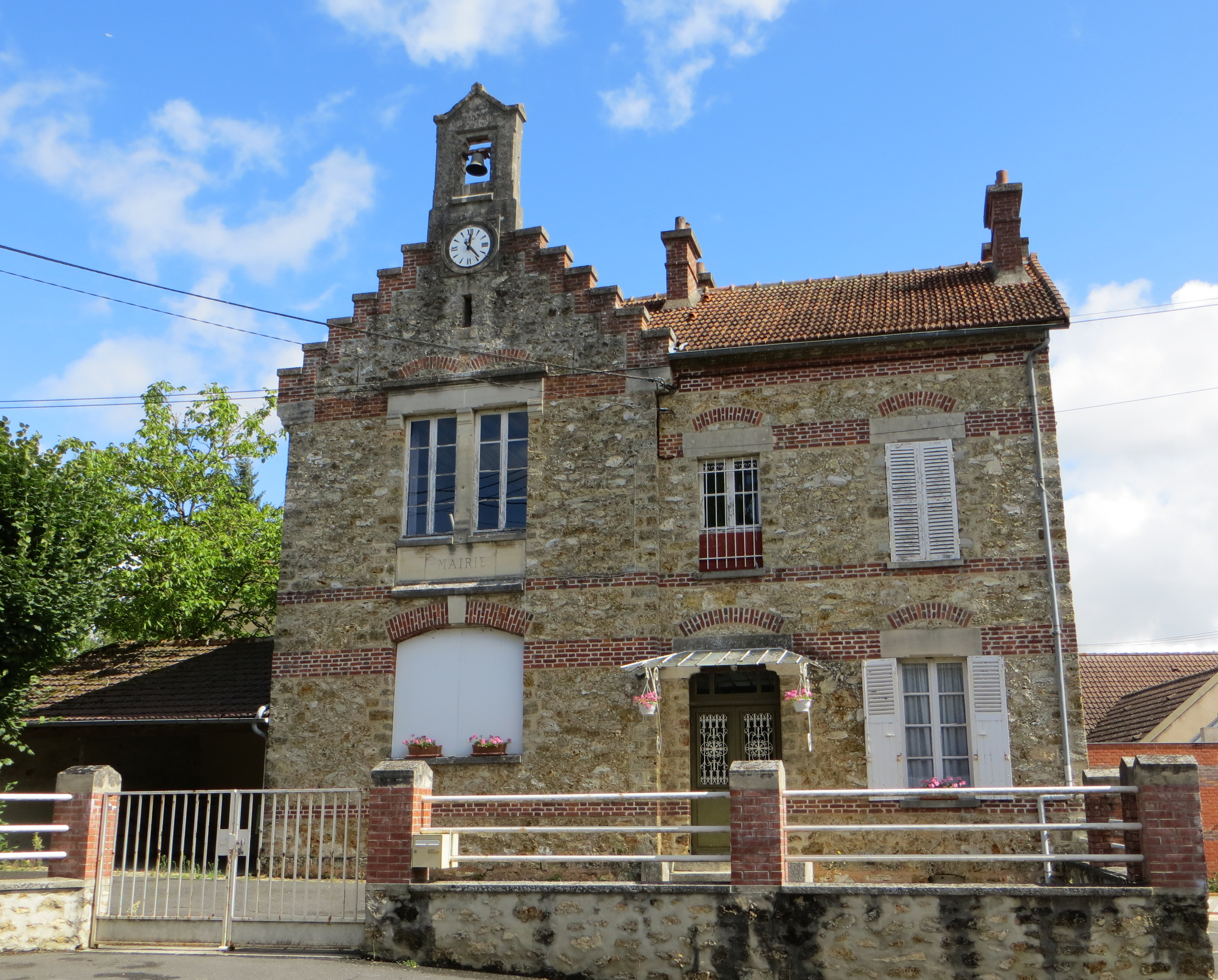
- The town hall in Saint-Ouen-sur-Morin

- Coat of arms
- Location of Saint-Ouen-sur-Morin
- Location within France Location within Île-de-France (region)
- Coordinates: 48°54′20″N 3°11′32″E
- Country: France
- Region: Île-de-France
- Department: Seine-et-Marne
- Arrondissement: Provins
- Canton: Coulommiers

Government
  - Mayor (2023–2026): Nathalie Vibert
- Area^{1}: 3.79 km^{2} (1.46 sq mi)
- Highest elevation: 187 m (614 ft)
- Lowest elevation: 61 m (200 ft)
- Population (2023): 529
  - Density: 140/km^{2} (362/sq mi)
- Time zone: UTC+01:00 (CET)
  - Summer (DST): UTC+02:00 (CEST)
- INSEE/Postal code: 77429 /77750
- ^{1} French Land Register data, which excludes lakes, ponds, glaciers > 1 km^{2} (0.386 sq mi or 247 acres) and river estuaries.

Saint-Ouen-sur-Morin (French pronunciation: [sɛ̃.t‿wɛ̃ syʁ mɔʁɛ̃], literally Saint-Ouen on Morin) is a commune in the Seine-et-Marne department in the Île-de-France region in north-central France.

== Demographics ==
Inhabitants of Saint-Ouen-sur-Morin are called Andonniens.

== See also ==
- Communes of the Seine-et-Marne department
