= Saint-Denis-lès-Rebais =

- Commune
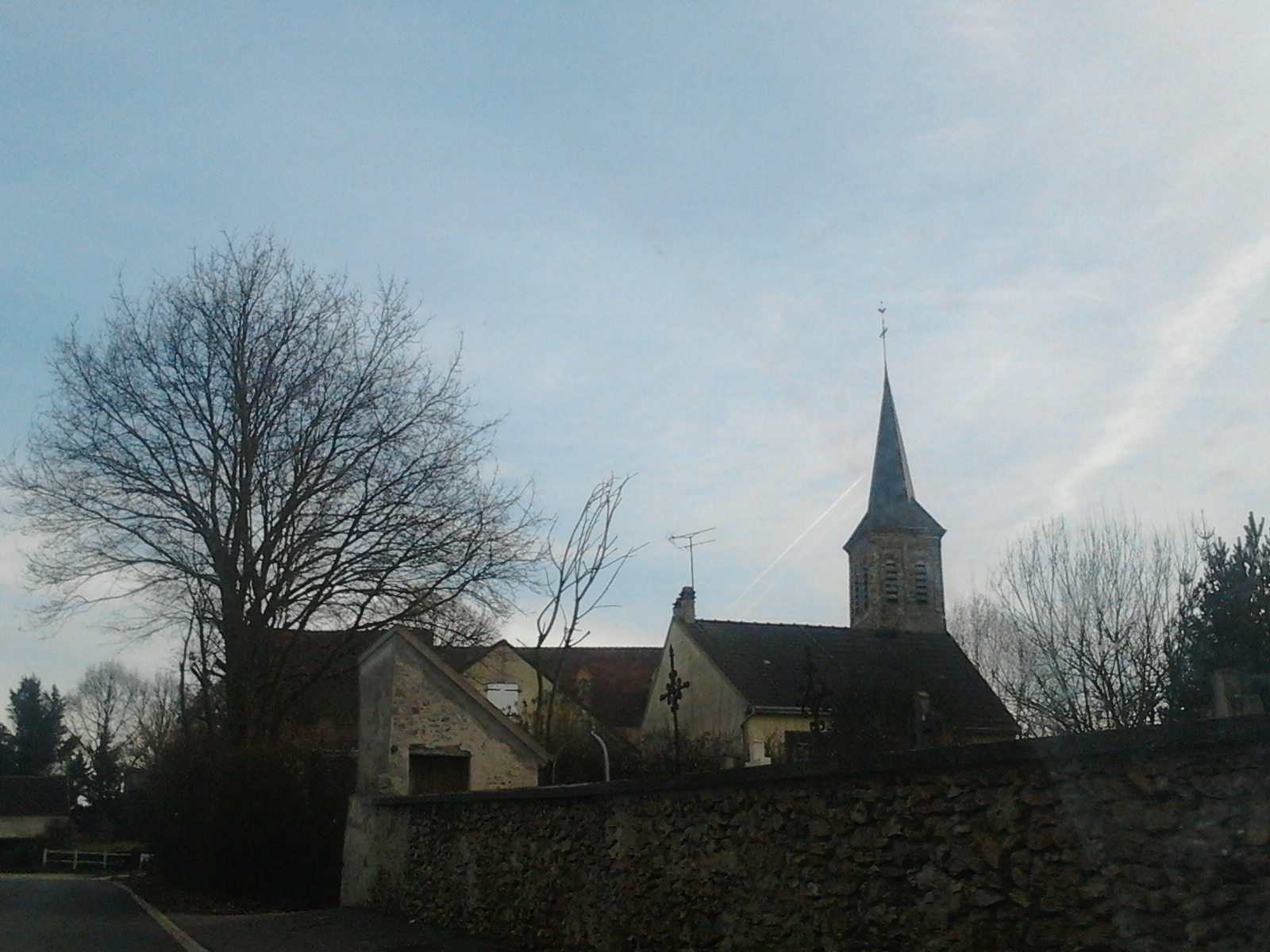
- The church in Saint-Denis-lès-Rebais
- Location of Saint-Denis-lès-Rebais
- Location within France Location within Île-de-France (region)
- Coordinates: 48°50′11″N 3°12′39″E
- Country: France
- Region: Île-de-France
- Department: Seine-et-Marne
- Arrondissement: Provins
- Canton: Coulommiers

Government
  - Mayor (2020–2026): Raymond Le Corre
- Area^{1}: 15.12 km^{2} (5.84 sq mi)
- Highest elevation: 177 m (581 ft)
- Lowest elevation: 90 m (300 ft)
- Population (2023): 966
  - Density: 63.9/km^{2} (165/sq mi)
- Time zone: UTC+01:00 (CET)
  - Summer (DST): UTC+02:00 (CEST)
- INSEE/Postal code: 77406 /77510
- ^{1} French Land Register data, which excludes lakes, ponds, glaciers > 1 km^{2} (0.386 sq mi or 247 acres) and river estuaries.

Saint-Denis-lès-Rebais (French pronunciation: [sɛ̃ dəni lɛ ʁəbɛ], literally Saint-Denis near Rebais) is a commune in the Seine-et-Marne department in the Île-de-France region in north-central France.

== Demographics ==
Inhabitants of Saint-Denis-lès-Rebais are called Dyonisiens.

== See also ==
- Communes of the Seine-et-Marne department
