= Hondevilliers =

- Commune
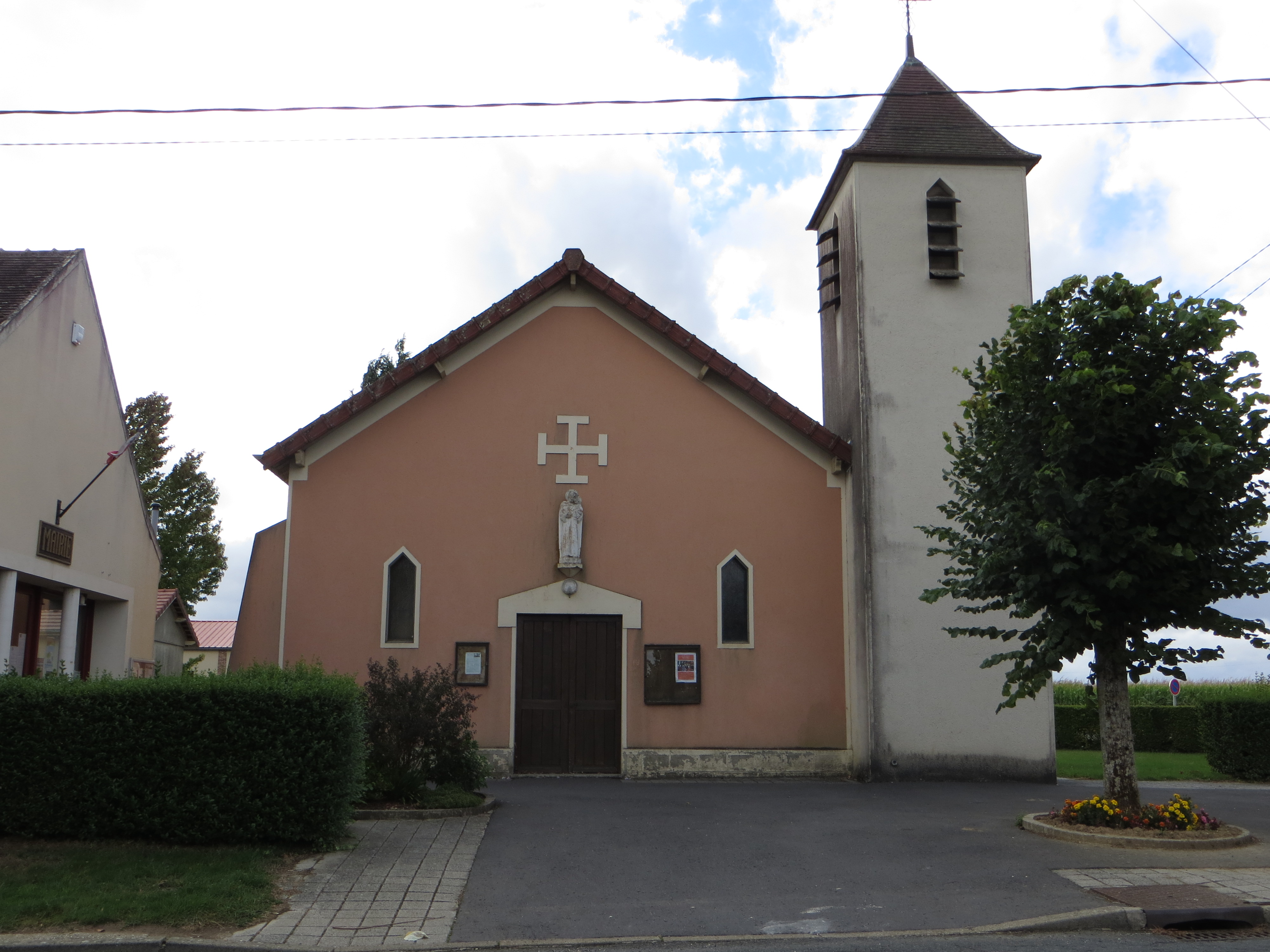
- The church in Hondevilliers

- Coat of arms
- Location of Hondevilliers
- Location within France Location within Île-de-France (region)
- Coordinates: 48°53′58″N 3°18′33″E
- Country: France
- Region: Île-de-France
- Department: Seine-et-Marne
- Arrondissement: Provins
- Canton: Coulommiers

Government
  - Mayor (2020–2026): Camille Diquas
- Area^{1}: 5.53 km^{2} (2.14 sq mi)
- Highest elevation: 211 m (692 ft)
- Lowest elevation: 108 m (354 ft)
- Population (2023): 256
  - Density: 46.3/km^{2} (120/sq mi)
- Time zone: UTC+01:00 (CET)
  - Summer (DST): UTC+02:00 (CEST)
- INSEE/Postal code: 77228 /77510
- ^{1} French Land Register data, which excludes lakes, ponds, glaciers > 1 km^{2} (0.386 sq mi or 247 acres) and river estuaries.

Hondevilliers (French pronunciation: [ɔ̃dvilje]) is a commune in the Seine-et-Marne department in the Île-de-France region in north-central France.

== Demographics ==
Inhabitants are called Dovinciens.

== See also ==
- Communes of the Seine-et-Marne department
