= La Chapelle-Moutils =

- Commune
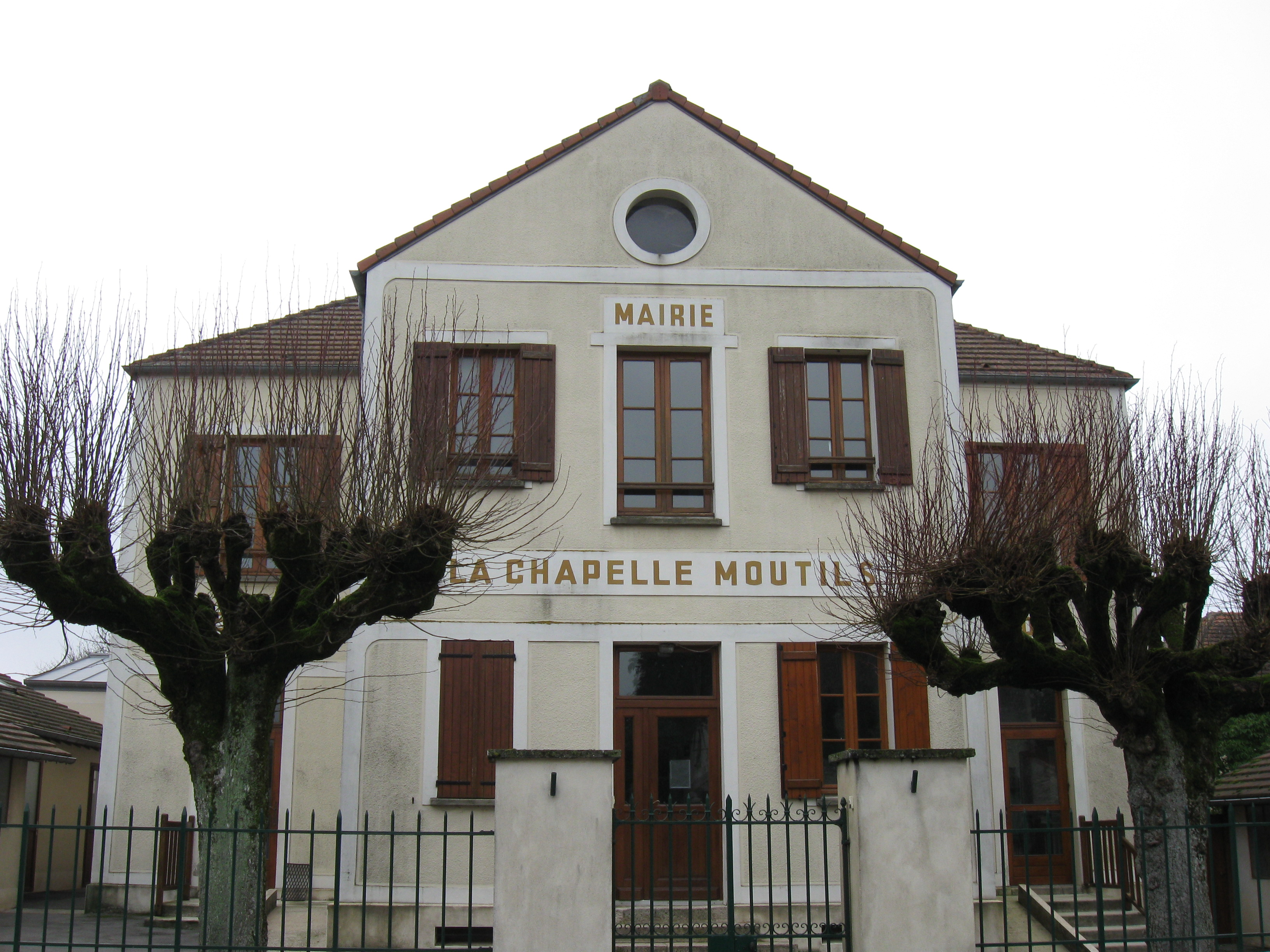
- The town hall in La Chapelle-Moutils
- Location of La Chapelle-Moutils
- Location within France Location within Île-de-France (region)
- Coordinates: 48°46′30″N 3°23′29″E
- Country: France
- Region: Île-de-France
- Department: Seine-et-Marne
- Arrondissement: Provins
- Canton: Coulommiers

Government
  - Mayor (2020–2026): Thierry Bontour
- Area^{1}: 18.9 km^{2} (7.3 sq mi)
- Highest elevation: 197 m (646 ft)
- Lowest elevation: 117 m (384 ft)
- Population (2023): 400
  - Density: 21/km^{2} (55/sq mi)
- Time zone: UTC+01:00 (CET)
  - Summer (DST): UTC+02:00 (CEST)
- INSEE/Postal code: 77093 /77320
- ^{1} French Land Register data, which excludes lakes, ponds, glaciers > 1 km^{2} (0.386 sq mi or 247 acres) and river estuaries.

La Chapelle-Moutils is a commune in the Seine-et-Marne department in the Île-de-France region in north-central France. It was created in 1973 by the merger of two former communes: La Chapelle-Véronge and Moutils.

== Demographics ==
The inhabitants are called Capellomoutillais.

== See also ==
- Communes of the Seine-et-Marne department
