= Saint-Léger, Seine-et-Marne =

Saint-Léger
- Commune
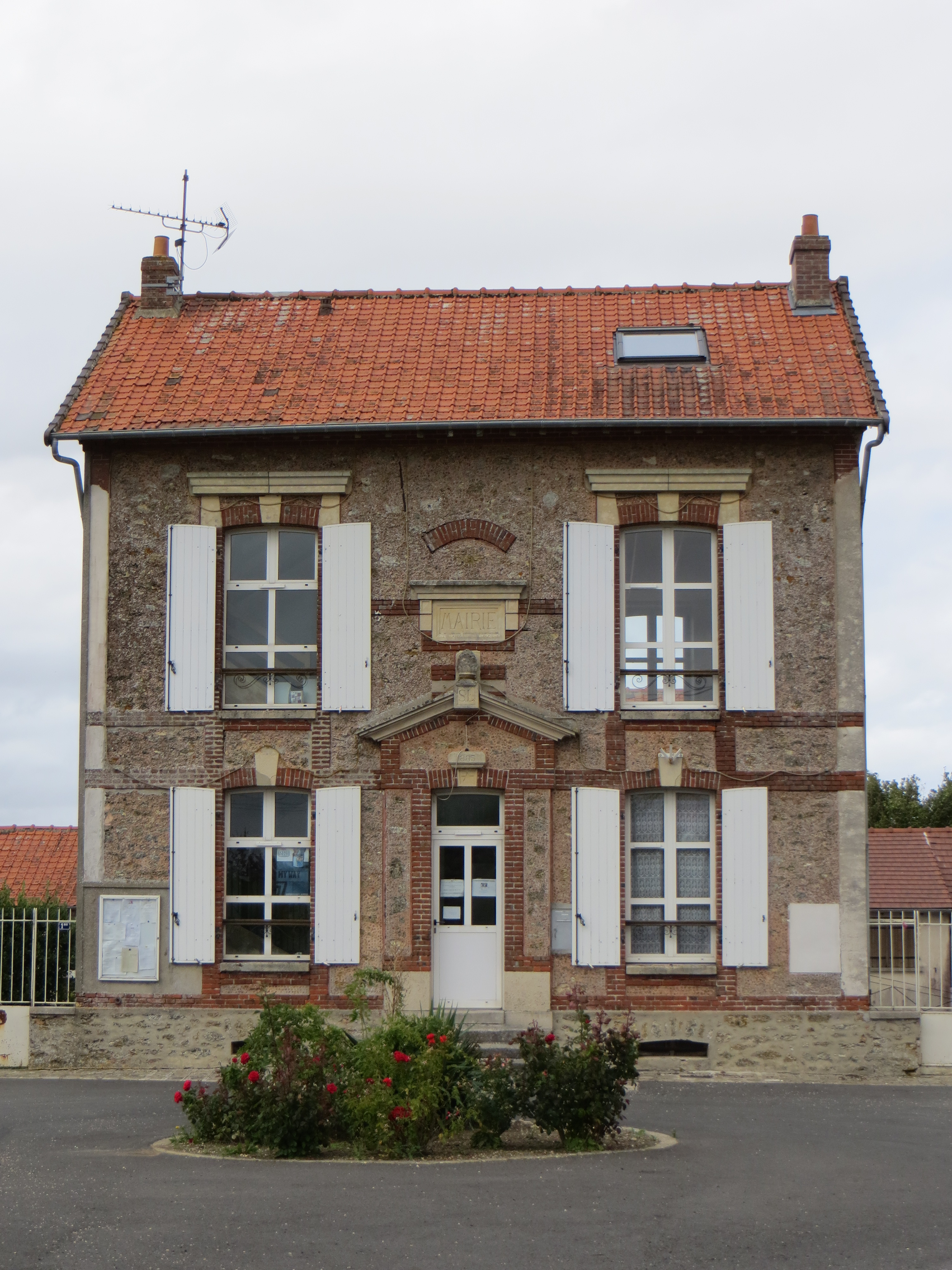
- The town hall in Saint-Léger
- Location of Saint-Léger
- Location within France Location within Île-de-France (region)
- Coordinates: 48°50′23″N 3°15′21″E
- Country: France
- Region: Île-de-France
- Department: Seine-et-Marne
- Arrondissement: Provins
- Canton: Coulommiers

Government
  - Mayor (2020–2026): Marie-France Guignier
- Area^{1}: 9.63 km^{2} (3.72 sq mi)
- Highest elevation: 184 m (604 ft)
- Lowest elevation: 150 m (490 ft)
- Population (2023): 244
  - Density: 25.3/km^{2} (65.6/sq mi)
- Time zone: UTC+01:00 (CET)
  - Summer (DST): UTC+02:00 (CEST)
- INSEE/Postal code: 77417 /77510
- ^{1} French Land Register data, which excludes lakes, ponds, glaciers > 1 km^{2} (0.386 sq mi or 247 acres) and river estuaries.

Saint-Léger (French pronunciation: [sɛ̃ leʒe]) is a commune in the Seine-et-Marne department in the Île-de-France region in north-central France.

== Demographics ==
Inhabitants of Saint-Léger are called Léodegendiens.

== See also ==
- Communes of the Seine-et-Marne department
