= Montolivet =

- Commune
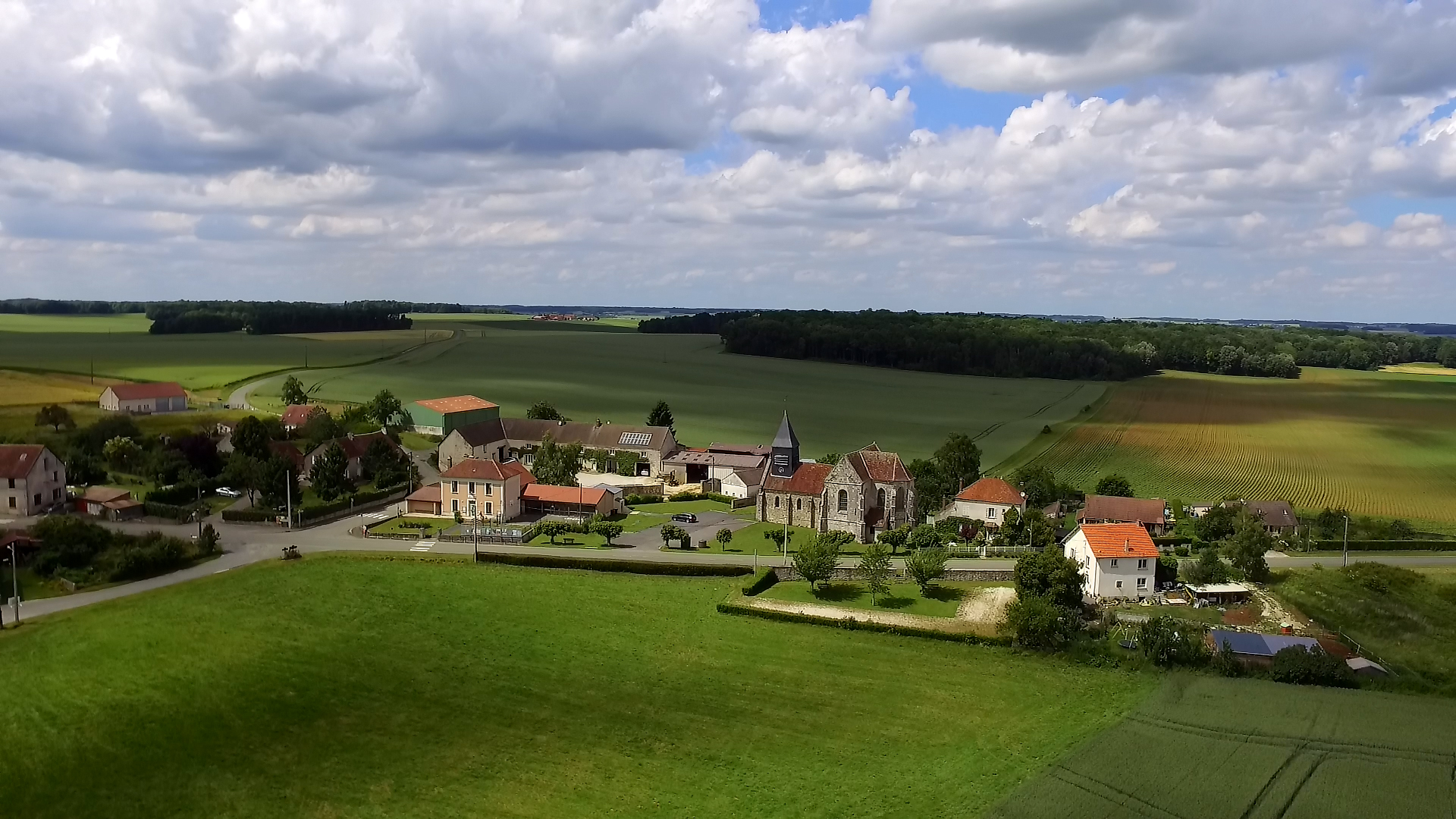
- A general view of Montolivet
- Location of Montolivet
- Location within France Location within Île-de-France (region)
- Coordinates: 48°49′48″N 3°26′25″E
- Country: France
- Region: Île-de-France
- Department: Seine-et-Marne
- Arrondissement: Provins
- Canton: Coulommiers

Government
  - Mayor (2020–2026): Lionel Moinier
- Area^{1}: 16.37 km^{2} (6.32 sq mi)
- Highest elevation: 203 m (666 ft)
- Lowest elevation: 153 m (502 ft)
- Population (2023): 257
  - Density: 15.7/km^{2} (40.7/sq mi)
- Time zone: UTC+01:00 (CET)
  - Summer (DST): UTC+02:00 (CEST)
- INSEE/Postal code: 77314 /77320
- ^{1} French Land Register data, which excludes lakes, ponds, glaciers > 1 km^{2} (0.386 sq mi or 247 acres) and river estuaries.

Montolivet (French pronunciation: [mɔ̃tɔlivɛ]) is a commune in the Seine-et-Marne department in the Île-de-France region in north-central France.

== See also ==
- Communes of the Seine-et-Marne department
