= Chartronges =

- Commune
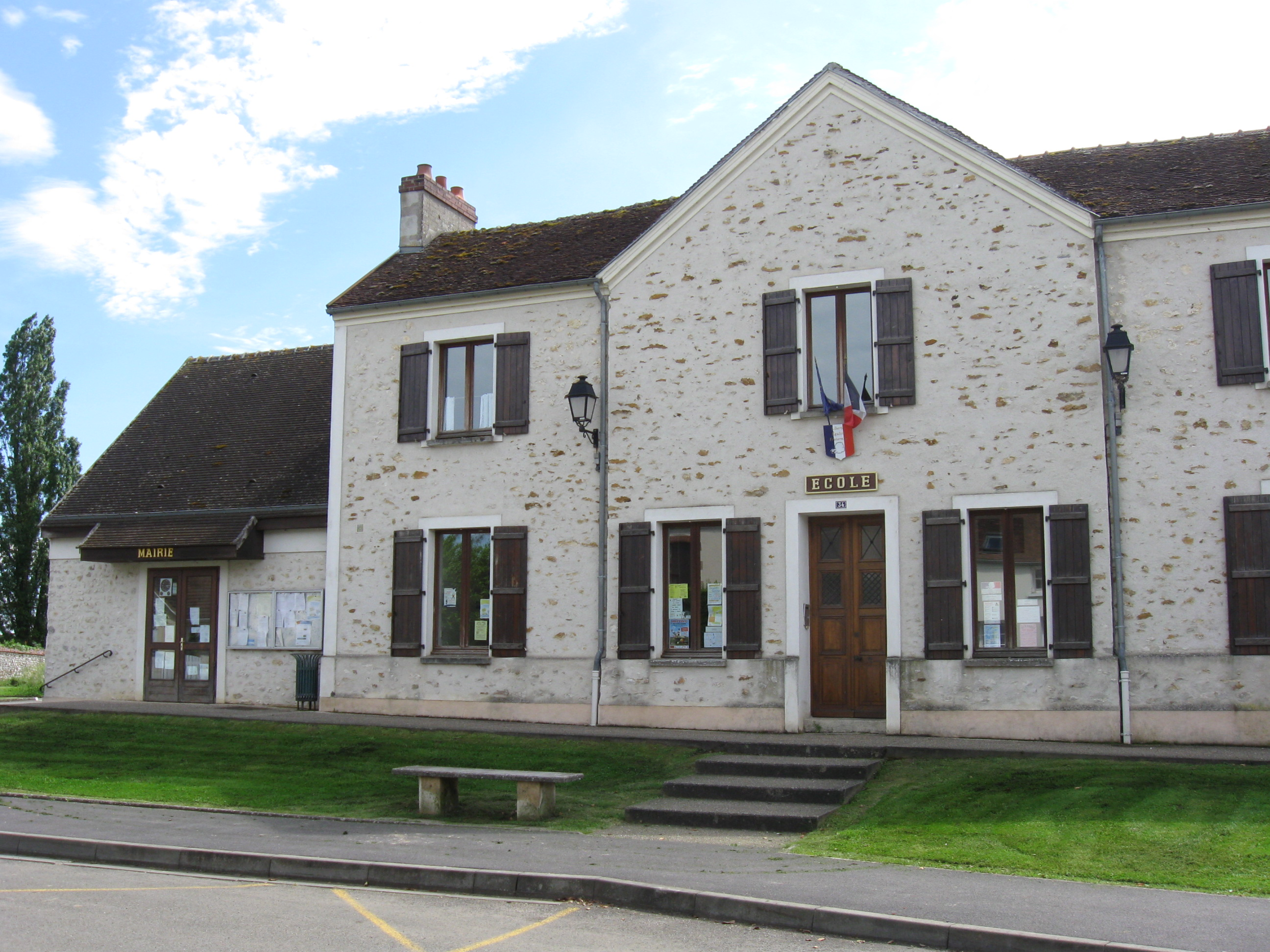
- The town hall in Chartronges
- Location of Chartronges
- Location within France Location within Île-de-France (region)
- Coordinates: 48°44′47″N 3°16′11″E
- Country: France
- Region: Île-de-France
- Department: Seine-et-Marne
- Arrondissement: Provins
- Canton: Coulommiers

Government
  - Mayor (2020–2026): André Trawinski
- Area^{1}: 8 km^{2} (3.1 sq mi)
- Highest elevation: 167 m (548 ft)
- Lowest elevation: 147 m (482 ft)
- Population (2023): 304
  - Density: 38/km^{2} (98/sq mi)
- Time zone: UTC+01:00 (CET)
  - Summer (DST): UTC+02:00 (CEST)
- INSEE/Postal code: 77097 /77320
- ^{1} French Land Register data, which excludes lakes, ponds, glaciers > 1 km^{2} (0.386 sq mi or 247 acres) and river estuaries.

Chartronges (French pronunciation: [ʃaʁtʁɔ̃ʒ]) is a commune in the Seine-et-Marne department in the Île-de-France region in north-central France.

== History ==
The town was first recorded in the 12th century, under the name of Chartronge. At this time, the church dedicated to Saint-Pierre-aux-Liens, was a dependency of the abbey at Solesmes. There was a statue of Saint Barbara in polychrome wood. In 1789, Chartronges was part of the election of Coulommiers and the generality of Paris; it was governed by Meaux Customs.

== Demographics ==
The inhabitants are called Chartrongeais. Demographics of the town have been documented via the population censuses performed by the municipality since 1793, published annually by Insee since 2006. In the census of 2018, the town had 295 inhabitants.

== Typology ==
According to the National Institute of Statistics and Economic Studies, Chartronges is a rural municipality due to its low population density. It is a part of the Paris metropolitan area.

== Localities and quarters ==
Chartronges has 54 localities.

== Accommodation ==
In 2017, the municipality had 114 dwellings, 100% of them private places such as townhouses, farmhouses, or pavilions. Of those dwellings, 91.2% were primary residences, 6.1% were second homes, and 2.6% were empty dwellings.

== Climate ==
The town shares the mild subtropical climate of the central and northern regions of France.

== Natura 2000 community ==
The river Vannetin is a Natura 2000 site in the town under the Habitats Directive with an area of 63 hectares (156 acres). Natura 2000 is a network of nature protection areas in the territory of the European Union. It comprises Special Areas of Conservation and Special Protection Areas designated under the Habitats Directive and the Birds Directive, respectively.

== Land usage ==
According to a survey done in 2018, the breakdown of land usage in Chartronges is as follows: arable land (93%), non-agricultural artificial green spaces (3.5%), urbanized areas (3%), heterogeneous agricultural areas (0.4%).

== Planning ==
In 2019, the municipality had a local urban plan under review.

== See also ==
- Communes of the Seine-et-Marne department
