= Chauffry =

- Commune
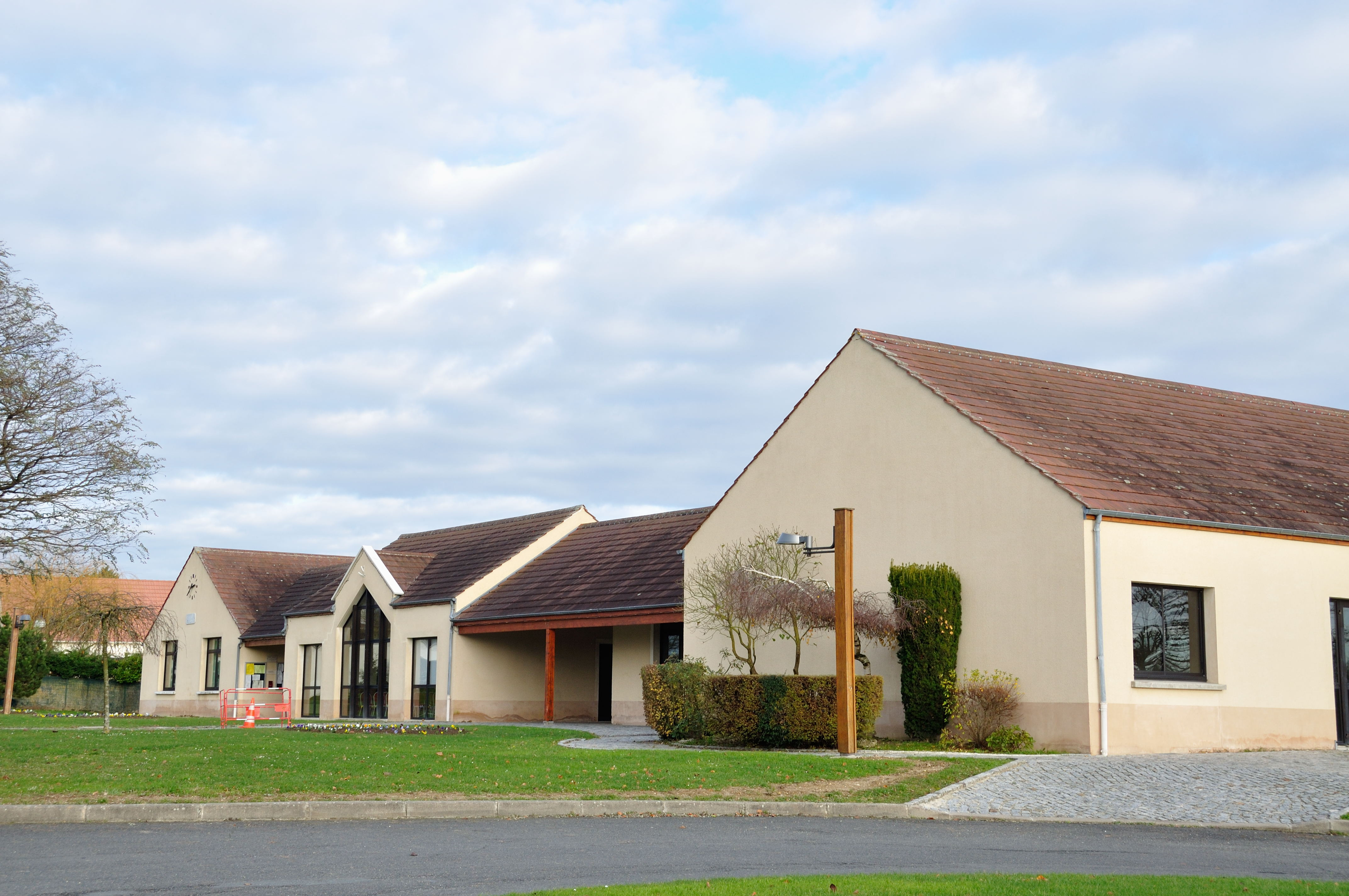
- The town hall in Chauffry
- Location of Chauffry
- Location within France Location within Île-de-France (region)
- Coordinates: 48°48′47″N 3°10′56″E
- Country: France
- Region: Île-de-France
- Department: Seine-et-Marne
- Arrondissement: Meaux
- Canton: Coulommiers
- Intercommunality: CA Coulommiers Pays de Brie

Government
  - Mayor (2020–2026): Richard Warzocha
- Area^{1}: 5.16 km^{2} (1.99 sq mi)
- Highest elevation: 155 m (509 ft)
- Lowest elevation: 75 m (246 ft)
- Population (2023): 994
  - Density: 193/km^{2} (499/sq mi)
- Time zone: UTC+01:00 (CET)
  - Summer (DST): UTC+02:00 (CEST)
- INSEE/Postal code: 77106 /77169
- ^{1} French Land Register data, which excludes lakes, ponds, glaciers > 1 km^{2} (0.386 sq mi or 247 acres) and river estuaries.

Chauffry (French pronunciation: [ʃofʁi]) is a commune in the Seine-et-Marne department in the Île-de-France region in north-central France.

== Demographics ==
The inhabitants are called Cauffériens.

== See also ==
- Communes of the Seine-et-Marne department
