= Saint-Rémy-de-la-Vanne =

- Commune
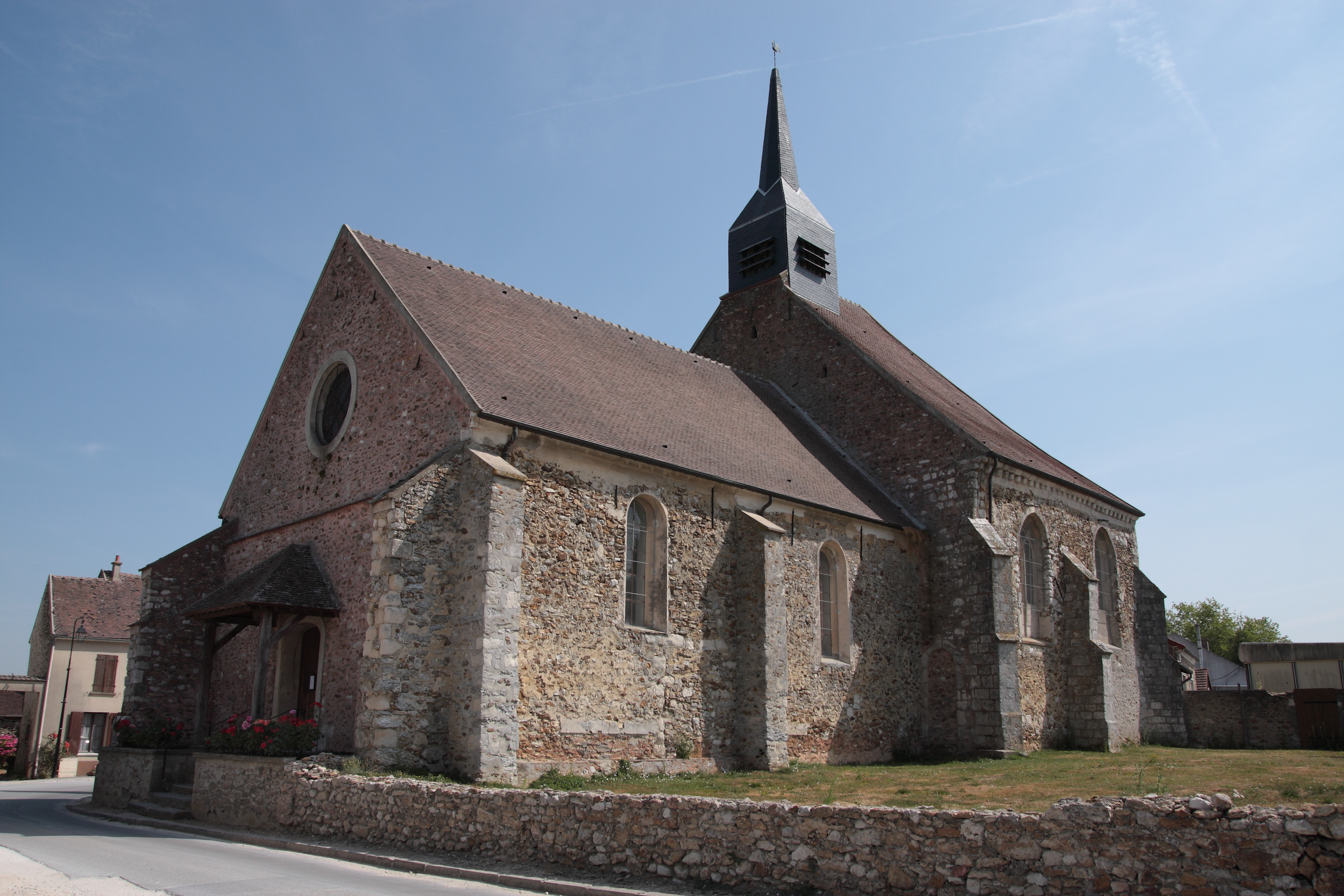
- The church in Saint-Rémy-la-Vanne
- Location of Saint-Rémy-de-la-Vanne
- Location within France Location within Île-de-France (region)
- Coordinates: 48°47′34″N 3°14′00″E
- Country: France
- Region: Île-de-France
- Department: Seine-et-Marne
- Arrondissement: Provins
- Canton: Coulommiers

Government
  - Mayor (2020–2026): Régine Herbette
- Area^{1}: 15 km^{2} (5.8 sq mi)
- Highest elevation: 175 m (574 ft)
- Lowest elevation: 85 m (279 ft)
- Population (2023): 985
  - Density: 66/km^{2} (170/sq mi)
- Time zone: UTC+01:00 (CET)
  - Summer (DST): UTC+02:00 (CEST)
- INSEE/Postal code: 77432 /77320
- ^{1} French Land Register data, which excludes lakes, ponds, glaciers > 1 km^{2} (0.386 sq mi or 247 acres) and river estuaries.

Saint-Rémy-de-la-Vanne (French pronunciation: [sɛ̃ ʁemi də la van]; before 2024: Saint-Rémy-la-Vanne) is a commune in the Seine-et-Marne department in the Île-de-France region in north-central France.

== Demographics ==
Inhabitants of Saint-Rémy-la-Vanne are called Saint-Rémois.

== See also ==
- Communes of the Seine-et-Marne department
