= Chevru =

- Commune
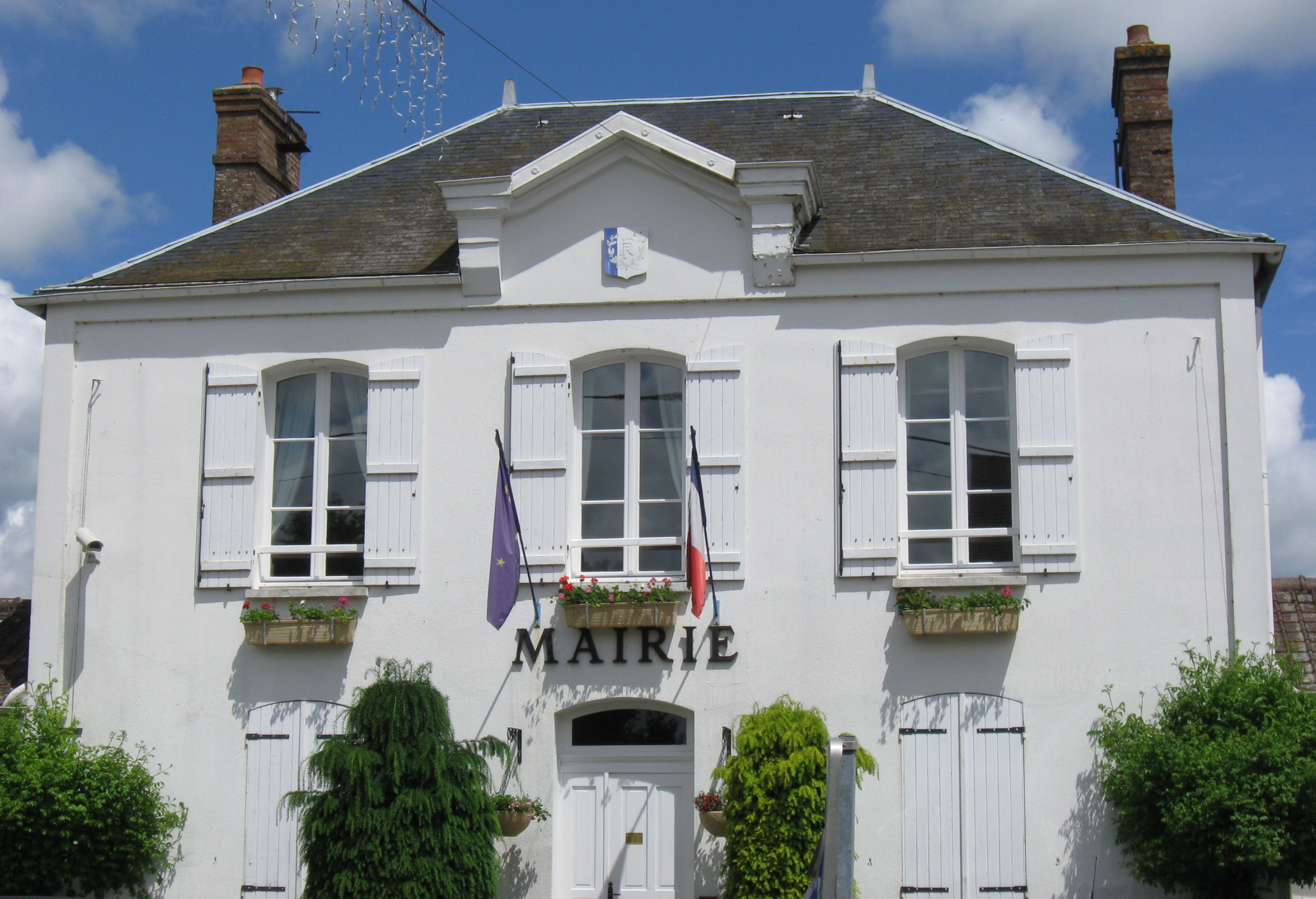
- The town hall in Chevru
- Location of Chevru
- Location within France Location within Île-de-France (region)
- Coordinates: 48°44′00″N 3°12′00″E
- Country: France
- Region: Île-de-France
- Department: Seine-et-Marne
- Arrondissement: Meaux
- Canton: Coulommiers
- Intercommunality: CA Coulommiers Pays de Brie

Government
  - Mayor (2020–2026): Jean-François Masson
- Area^{1}: 13.94 km^{2} (5.38 sq mi)
- Highest elevation: 165 m (541 ft)
- Lowest elevation: 121 m (397 ft)
- Population (2023): 1,012
  - Density: 72.60/km^{2} (188.0/sq mi)
- Time zone: UTC+01:00 (CET)
  - Summer (DST): UTC+02:00 (CEST)
- INSEE/Postal code: 77113 /77320
- ^{1} French Land Register data, which excludes lakes, ponds, glaciers > 1 km^{2} (0.386 sq mi or 247 acres) and river estuaries.

Chevru (French pronunciation: [ʃəvʁy]) is a commune in the Seine-et-Marne department in the Île-de-France region in north-central France.

== Demographics ==
The inhabitants are called Chevrotins.

== See also ==
- Communes of the Seine-et-Marne department
