= Lescherolles =

- Commune
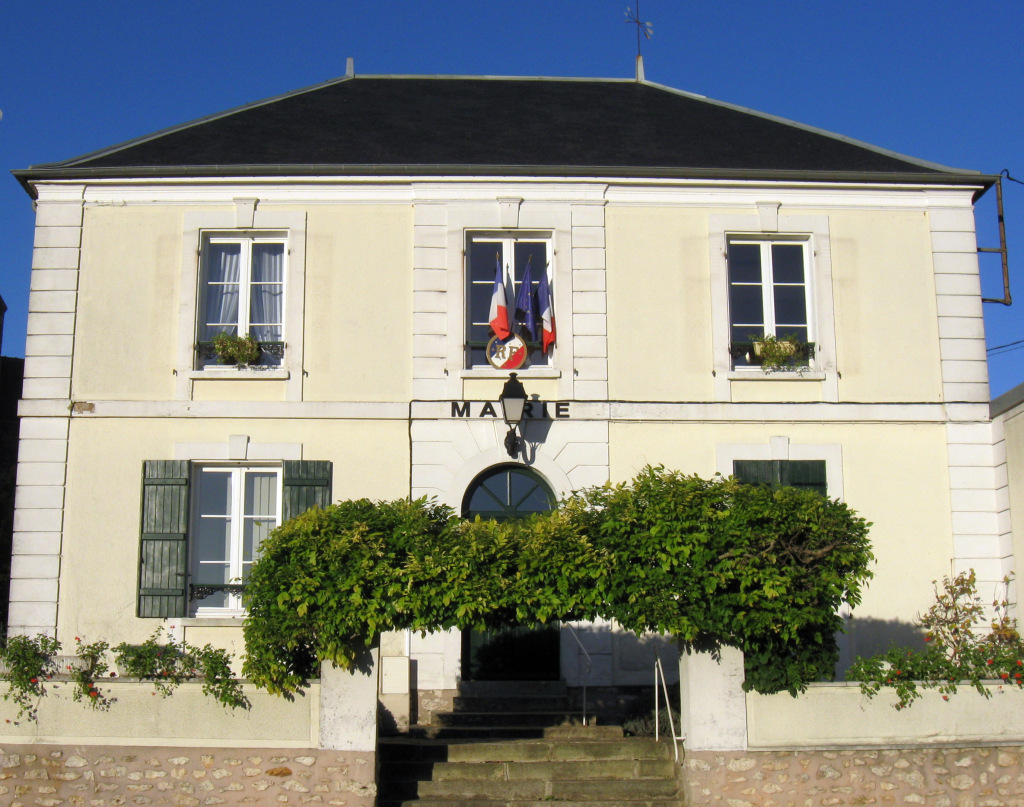
- The town hall in Lescherolles

- Coat of arms
- Location of Lescherolles
- Location within France Location within Île-de-France (region)
- Coordinates: 48°45′48″N 3°20′46″E
- Country: France
- Region: Île-de-France
- Department: Seine-et-Marne
- Arrondissement: Provins
- Canton: Coulommiers

Government
  - Mayor (2020–2026): Patrick Robert
- Area^{1}: 11.01 km^{2} (4.25 sq mi)
- Highest elevation: 192 m (630 ft)
- Lowest elevation: 116 m (381 ft)
- Population (2023): 464
  - Density: 42.1/km^{2} (109/sq mi)
- Time zone: UTC+01:00 (CET)
  - Summer (DST): UTC+02:00 (CEST)
- INSEE/Postal code: 77247 /77320
- ^{1} French Land Register data, which excludes lakes, ponds, glaciers > 1 km^{2} (0.386 sq mi or 247 acres) and river estuaries.

Lescherolles (French pronunciation: [lɛʃʁɔl] ）) is a commune in the Seine-et-Marne department in the Île-de-France region in north-central France.

== Demographics ==
Inhabitants are called Lescherollais.

== See also ==
- Communes of the Seine-et-Marne department
