= Orly-sur-Morin =

- Commune
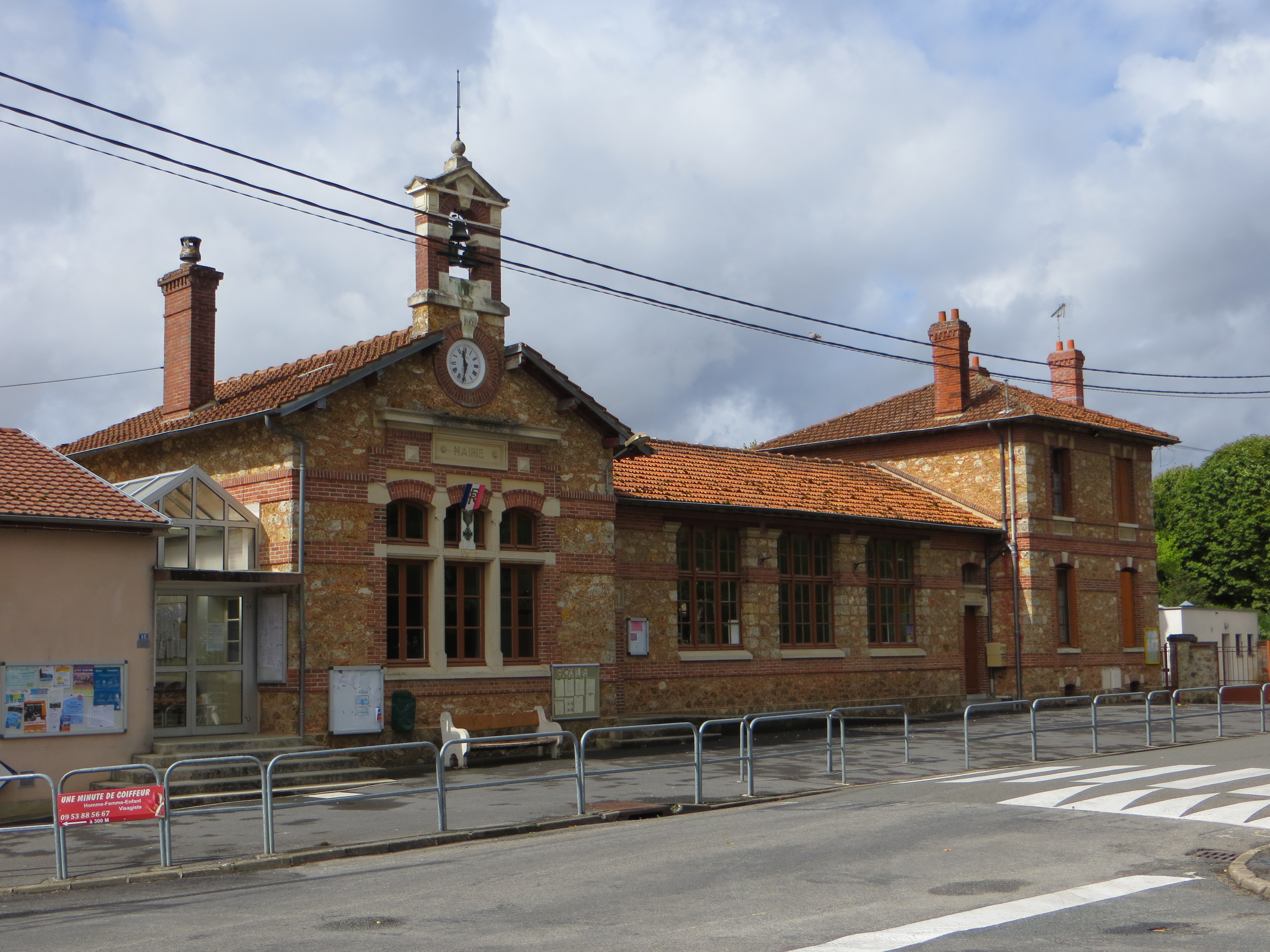
- The town hall in Orly-sur-Morin

- Coat of arms
- Location of Orly-sur-Morin
- Location within France Location within Île-de-France (region)
- Coordinates: 48°54′16″N 3°13′49″E
- Country: France
- Region: Île-de-France
- Department: Seine-et-Marne
- Arrondissement: Provins
- Canton: Coulommiers

Government
  - Mayor (2020–2026): Lionel Legros
- Area^{1}: 5.87 km^{2} (2.27 sq mi)
- Highest elevation: 180 m (590 ft)
- Lowest elevation: 65 m (213 ft)
- Population (2023): 656
  - Density: 112/km^{2} (289/sq mi)
- Time zone: UTC+01:00 (CET)
  - Summer (DST): UTC+02:00 (CEST)
- INSEE/Postal code: 77345 /77750
- ^{1} French Land Register data, which excludes lakes, ponds, glaciers > 1 km^{2} (0.386 sq mi or 247 acres) and river estuaries.

Orly-sur-Morin (French pronunciation: [ɔʁli syʁ mɔʁɛ̃], literally Orly on Morin) is a commune in the Seine-et-Marne department in the Île-de-France region in north-central France.

== Demographics ==
Inhabitants are called Orlysiens.

== See also ==
- Communes of the Seine-et-Marne department
