= Amillis =

- Commune
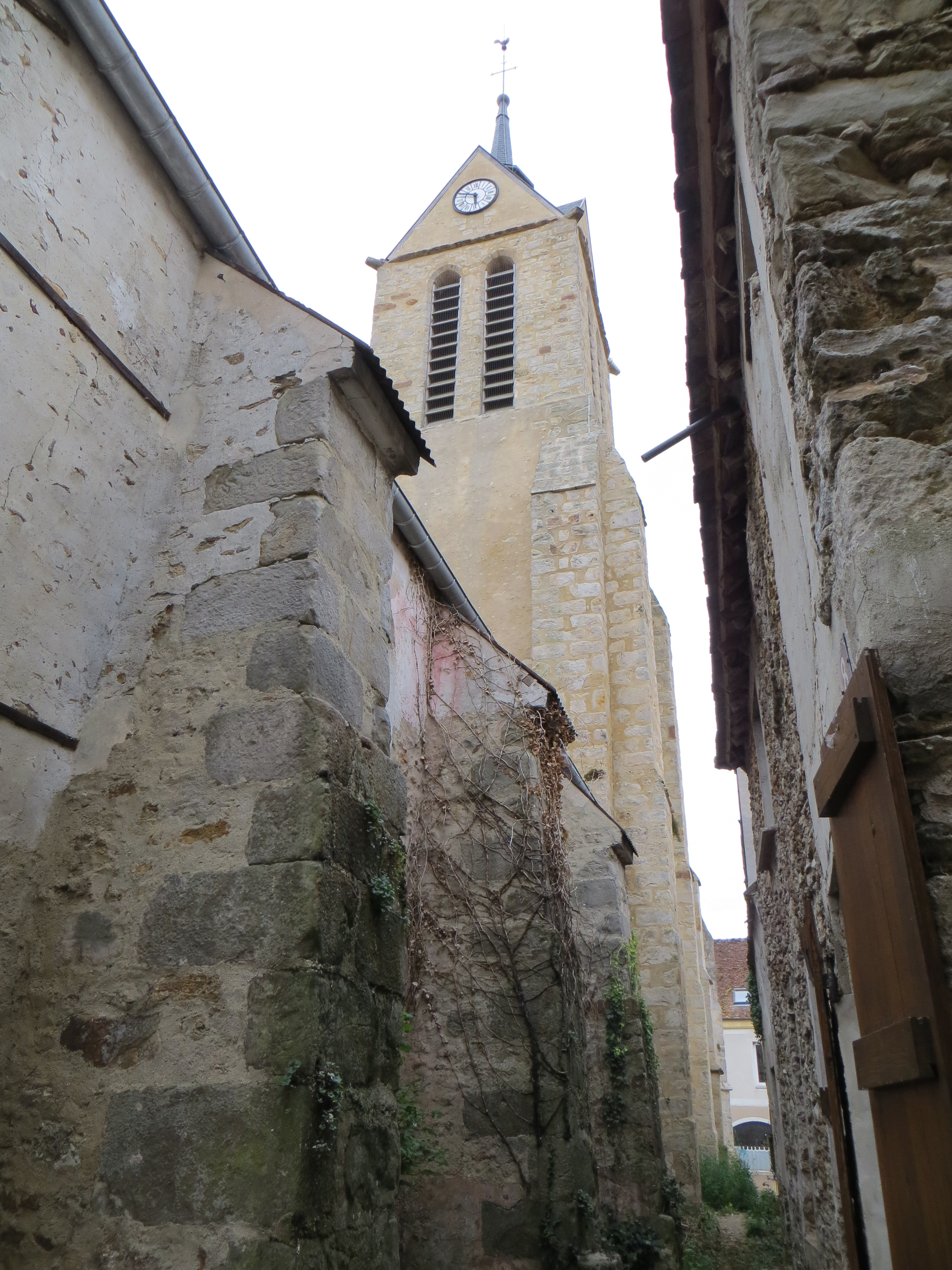
- The church in Amillis
- Location of Amillis
- Location within France Location within Île-de-France (region)
- Coordinates: 48°44′25″N 3°07′50″E
- Country: France
- Region: Île-de-France
- Department: Seine-et-Marne
- Arrondissement: Meaux
- Canton: Coulommiers
- Intercommunality: CA Coulommiers Pays de Brie

Government
  - Mayor (2020–2026): Muriel Domard
- Area^{1}: 20.06 km^{2} (7.75 sq mi)
- Highest elevation: 163 m (535 ft)
- Lowest elevation: 102 m (335 ft)
- Population (2023): 830
  - Density: 41/km^{2} (110/sq mi)
- Time zone: UTC+01:00 (CET)
  - Summer (DST): UTC+02:00 (CEST)
- INSEE/Postal code: 77002 /77120
- ^{1} French Land Register data, which excludes lakes, ponds, glaciers > 1 km^{2} (0.386 sq mi or 247 acres) and river estuaries.

Amillis (French pronunciation: [amiji]) is a commune in the Seine-et-Marne department in the Île-de-France region in north-central France.

== Geography ==
The village lies in the middle of the commune, on the right bank of the Aubetin, which flows northwestward through the commune.

== Demographics ==
The inhabitants are Amilissiens.

== See also ==
- Communes of the Seine-et-Marne department
