= Meilleray =

- Commune
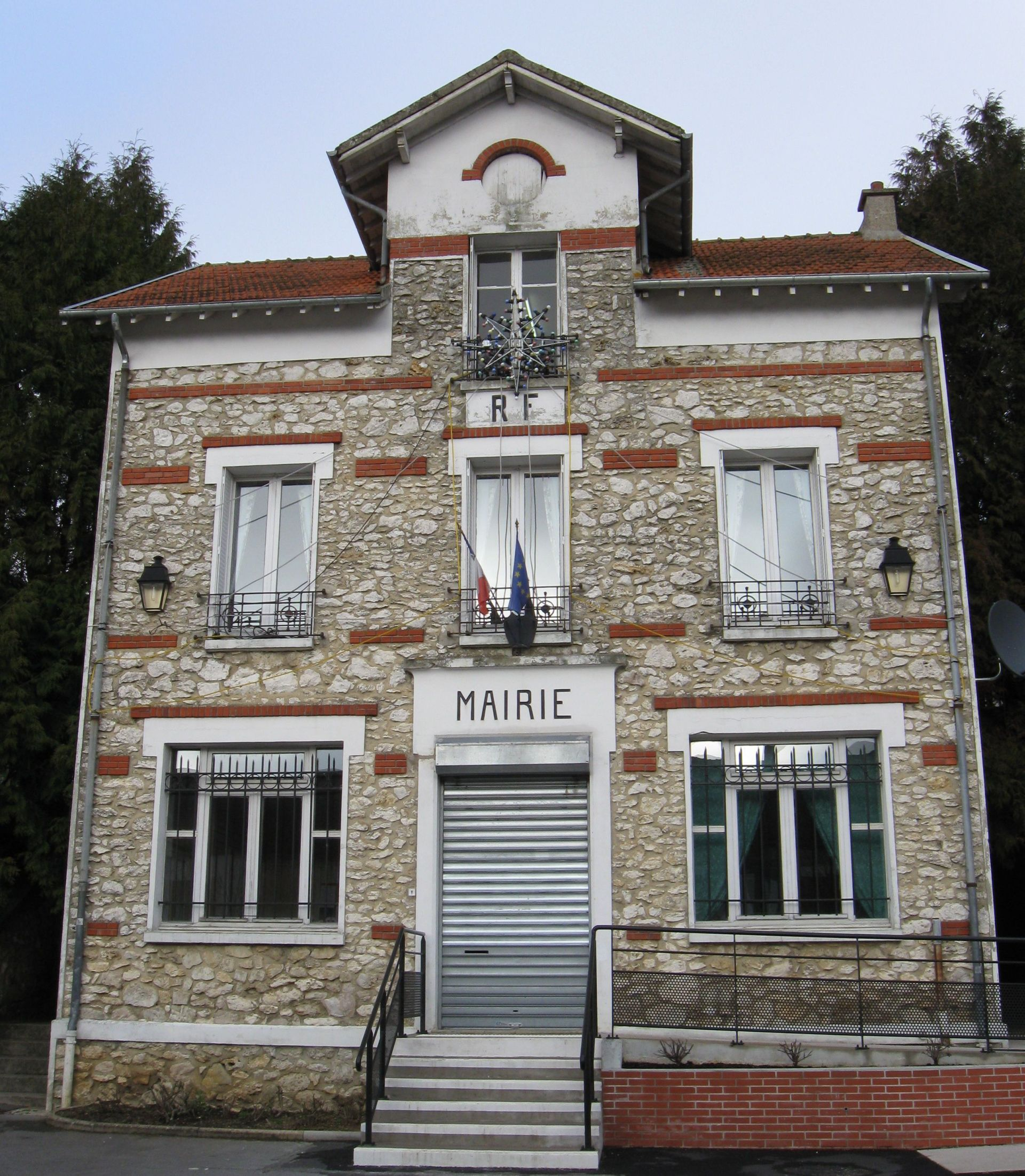
- The town hall in Meilleray
- Location of Meilleray
- Location within France Location within Île-de-France (region)
- Coordinates: 48°47′25″N 3°25′34″E
- Country: France
- Region: Île-de-France
- Department: Seine-et-Marne
- Arrondissement: Provins
- Canton: Coulommiers

Government
  - Mayor (2020–2026): Jean-Pierre Bertin
- Area^{1}: 7.77 km^{2} (3.00 sq mi)
- Highest elevation: 188 m (617 ft)
- Lowest elevation: 107 m (351 ft)
- Population (2023): 504
  - Density: 64.9/km^{2} (168/sq mi)
- Time zone: UTC+01:00 (CET)
  - Summer (DST): UTC+02:00 (CEST)
- INSEE/Postal code: 77287 /77320
- ^{1} French Land Register data, which excludes lakes, ponds, glaciers > 1 km^{2} (0.386 sq mi or 247 acres) and river estuaries.

Meilleray (French pronunciation: [mɛjʁɛ]) is a commune in the Seine-et-Marne department in the Île-de-France region in north-central France.

== Demographics ==
Inhabitants are called Meillerassiens.

== See also ==
- Communes of the Seine-et-Marne department
