= Saint-Barthélemy, Seine-et-Marne =

Saint-Barthélemy
- Commune
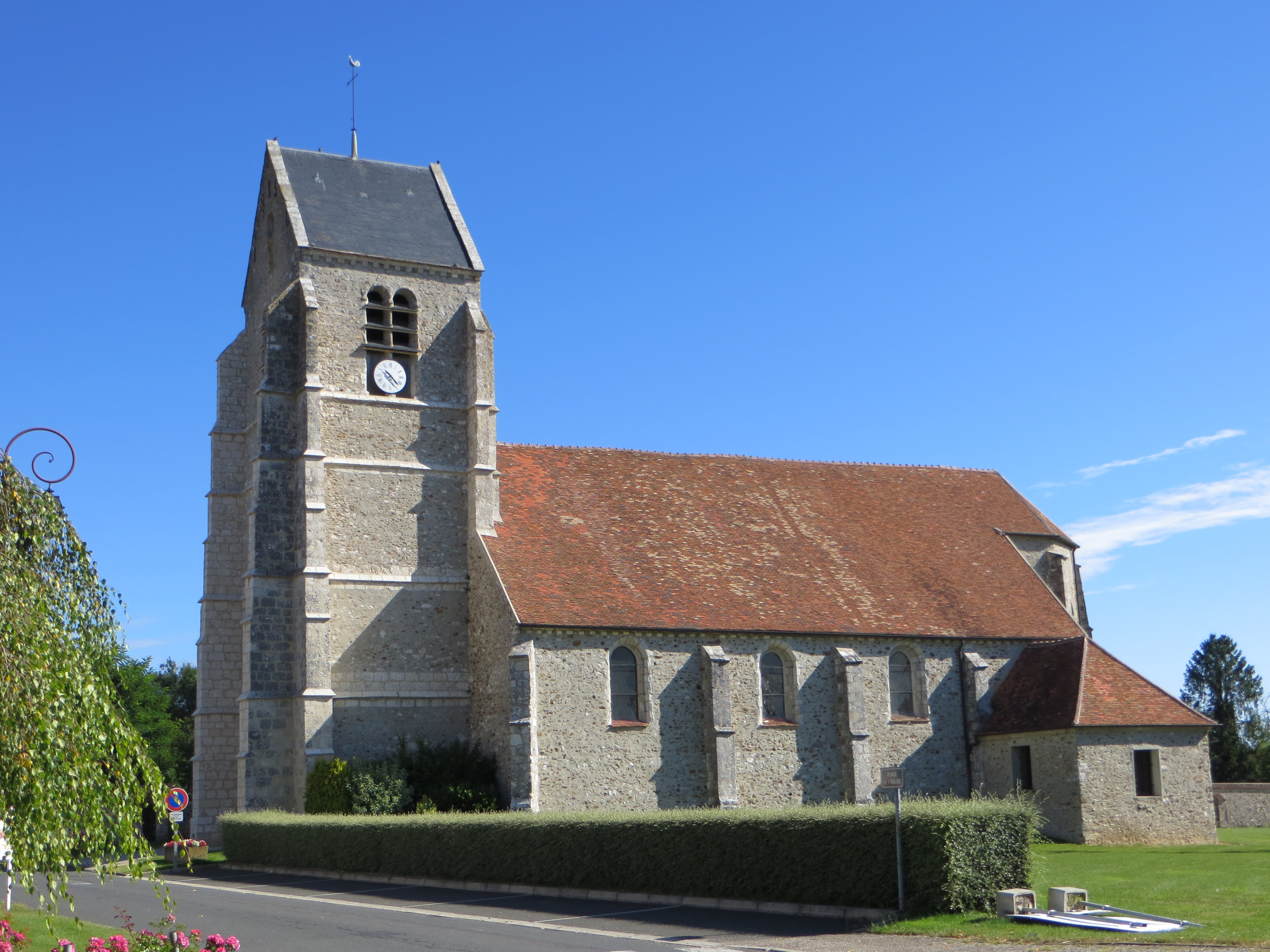
- The church in Saint-Barthélemy
- Location of Saint-Barthélemy
- Location within France Location within Île-de-France (region)
- Coordinates: 48°49′02″N 3°21′41″E
- Country: France
- Region: Île-de-France
- Department: Seine-et-Marne
- Arrondissement: Provins
- Canton: Coulommiers

Government
  - Mayor (2020–2026): Michel Roch
- Area^{1}: 14.99 km^{2} (5.79 sq mi)
- Highest elevation: 203 m (666 ft)
- Lowest elevation: 159 m (522 ft)
- Population (2023): 335
  - Density: 22.3/km^{2} (57.9/sq mi)
- Time zone: UTC+01:00 (CET)
  - Summer (DST): UTC+02:00 (CEST)
- INSEE/Postal code: 77402 /77320
- ^{1} French Land Register data, which excludes lakes, ponds, glaciers > 1 km^{2} (0.386 sq mi or 247 acres) and river estuaries.

Saint-Barthélemy (French pronunciation: [sɛ̃ baʁtelemi]) is a commune in the Seine-et-Marne department in the Île-de-France region in north-central France.

== Demographics ==
Inhabitants of Saint-Barthélemy are called Barthéloméens.

== See also ==
- Communes of the Seine-et-Marne department
