= La Trétoire =

- Commune
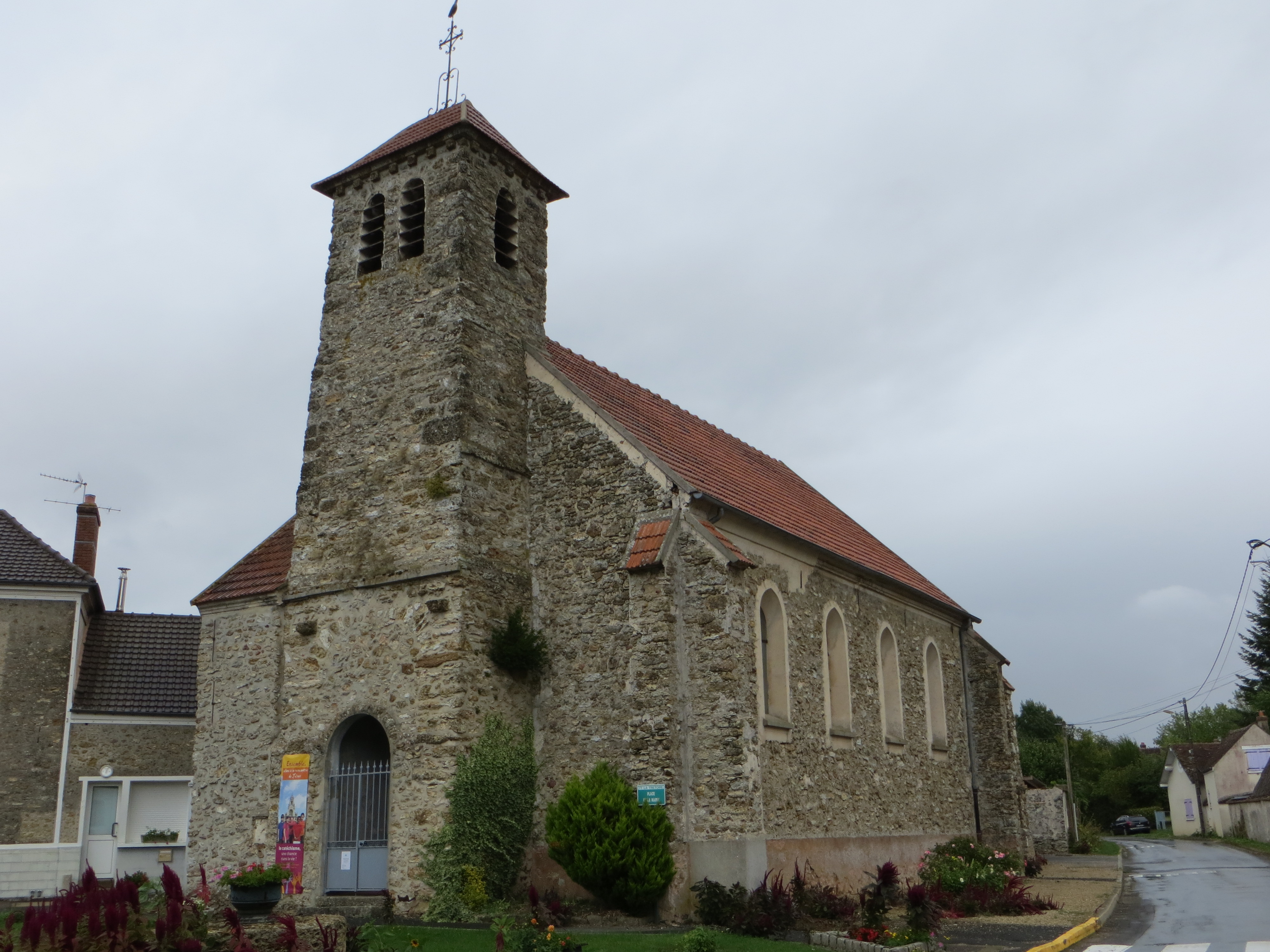
- The church in La Trétoire
- Location of La Trétoire
- Location within France Location within Île-de-France (region)
- Coordinates: 48°52′25″N 3°15′07″E
- Country: France
- Region: Île-de-France
- Department: Seine-et-Marne
- Arrondissement: Provins
- Canton: Coulommiers

Government
  - Mayor (2020–2026): José Dervin
- Area^{1}: 9.28 km^{2} (3.58 sq mi)
- Highest elevation: 189 m (620 ft)
- Lowest elevation: 68 m (223 ft)
- Population (2023): 459
  - Density: 49.5/km^{2} (128/sq mi)
- Time zone: UTC+01:00 (CET)
  - Summer (DST): UTC+02:00 (CEST)
- INSEE/Postal code: 77472 /77510
- ^{1} French Land Register data, which excludes lakes, ponds, glaciers > 1 km^{2} (0.386 sq mi or 247 acres) and river estuaries.

La Trétoire (French pronunciation: [la tʁetwaʁ]) is a commune in the Seine-et-Marne department in the Île-de-France region in north-central France.

== Demographics ==
Inhabitants of La Trétoire are called Trétoiriens.

== See also ==
- Communes of the Seine-et-Marne department
