= Montdauphin =

- Commune
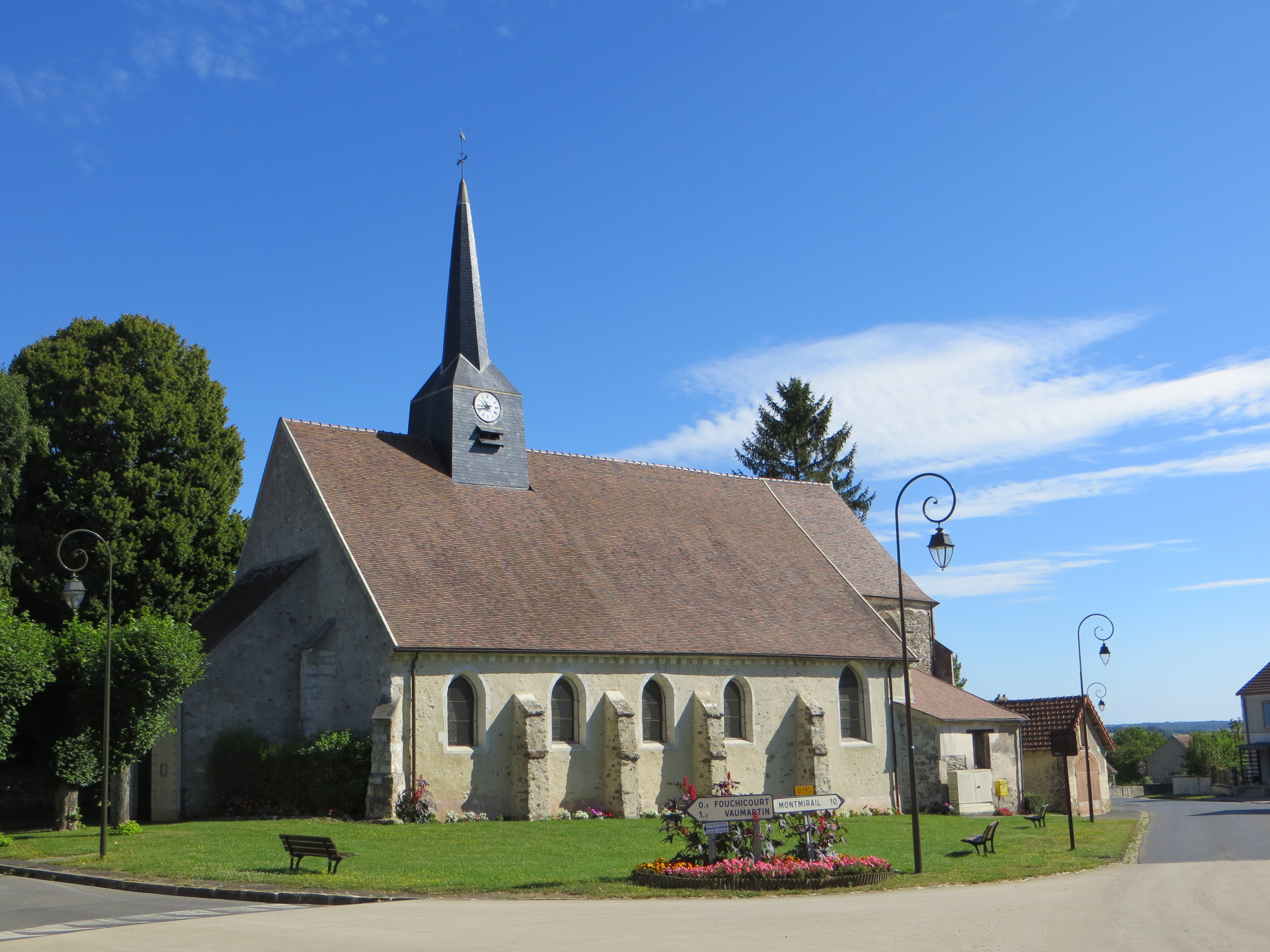
- The church in Montdauphin
- Location of Montdauphin
- Location within France Location within Île-de-France (region)
- Coordinates: 48°51′07″N 3°25′42″E
- Country: France
- Region: Île-de-France
- Department: Seine-et-Marne
- Arrondissement: Provins
- Canton: Coulommiers

Government
  - Mayor (2020–2026): Philippe de Vestele
- Area^{1}: 9.84 km^{2} (3.80 sq mi)
- Highest elevation: 197 m (646 ft)
- Lowest elevation: 102 m (335 ft)
- Population (2023): 235
  - Density: 23.9/km^{2} (61.9/sq mi)
- Time zone: UTC+01:00 (CET)
  - Summer (DST): UTC+02:00 (CEST)
- INSEE/Postal code: 77303 /77320
- ^{1} French Land Register data, which excludes lakes, ponds, glaciers > 1 km^{2} (0.386 sq mi or 247 acres) and river estuaries.

Montdauphin (French pronunciation: [mɔ̃dofɛ̃]) is a commune in the Seine-et-Marne department in the Île-de-France region in north-central France.

== Demographics ==
Inhabitants are called Montdauphinois.

== See also ==
- Communes of the Seine-et-Marne department
