= Boitron, Seine-et-Marne =

Boitron
- Commune
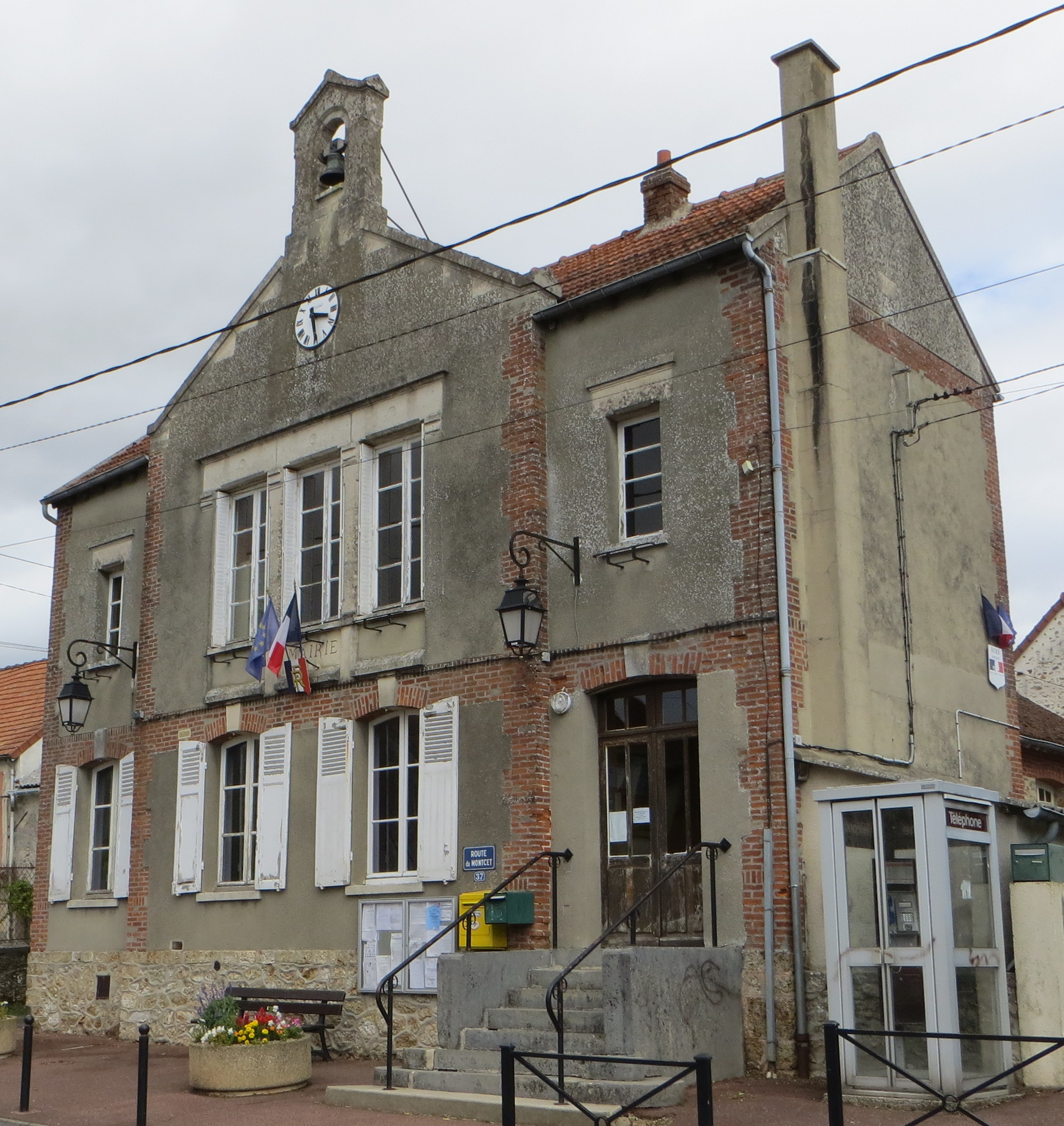
- The town hall in Boitron

- Coat of arms
- Location of Boitron
- Location within France Location within Île-de-France (region)
- Coordinates: 48°53′46″N 3°15′42″E
- Country: France
- Region: Île-de-France
- Department: Seine-et-Marne
- Arrondissement: Provins
- Canton: Coulommiers

Government
  - Mayor (2020–2026): Laurent Callot
- Area^{1}: 5.14 km^{2} (1.98 sq mi)
- Highest elevation: 196 m (643 ft)
- Lowest elevation: 67 m (220 ft)
- Population (2023): 322
  - Density: 62.6/km^{2} (162/sq mi)
- Time zone: UTC+01:00 (CET)
  - Summer (DST): UTC+02:00 (CEST)
- INSEE/Postal code: 77043 /77750
- ^{1} French Land Register data, which excludes lakes, ponds, glaciers > 1 km^{2} (0.386 sq mi or 247 acres) and river estuaries.

Boitron (French pronunciation: [bwatʁɔ̃]) is a commune in the Seine-et-Marne department in the Île-de-France region in north-central France.

== See also ==
- Communes of the Seine-et-Marne department
