= Bellot, Seine-et-Marne =

Bellot
- Commune
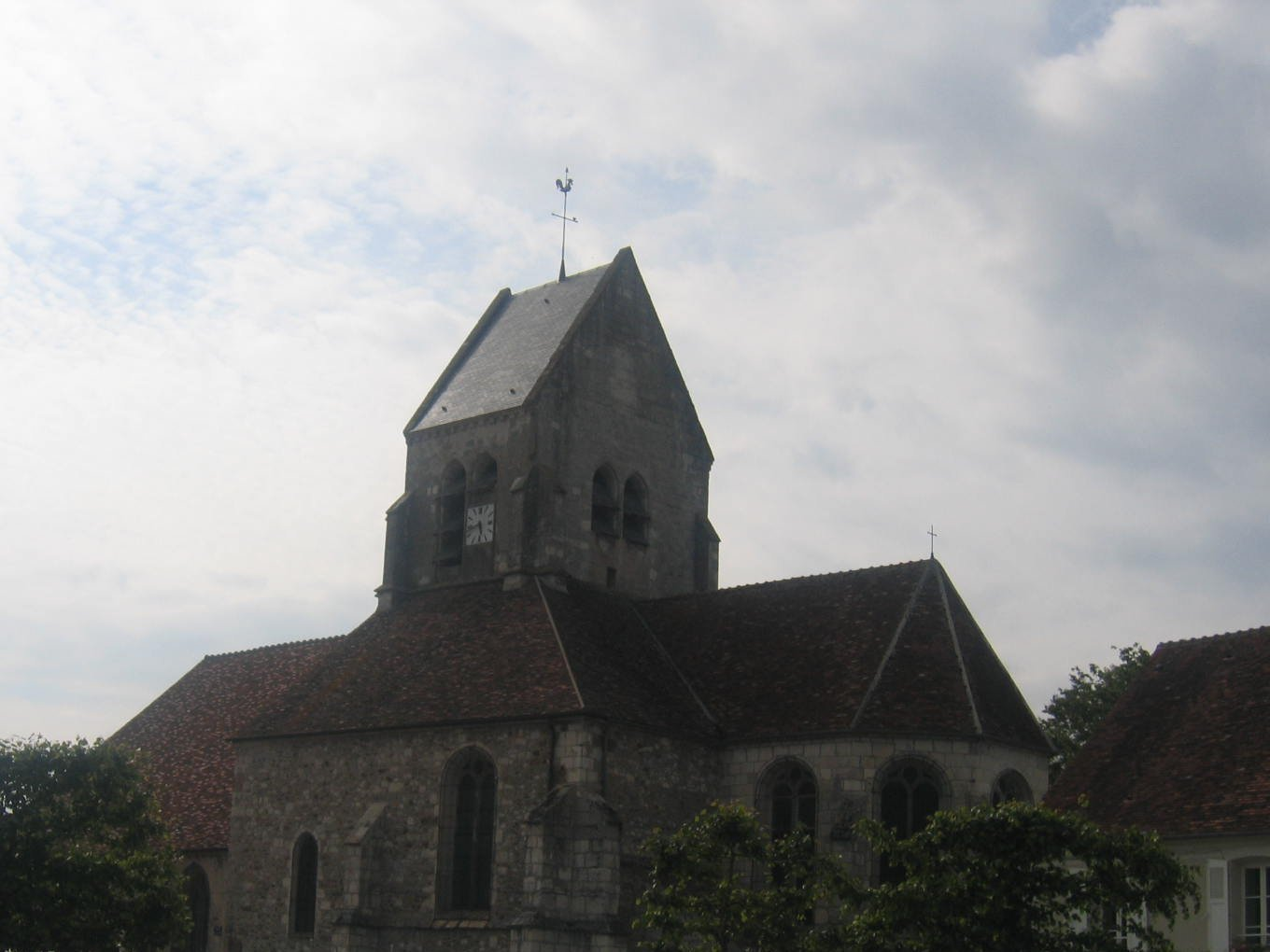
- The church in Bellot

- Coat of arms
- Location of Bellot
- Location within France Location within Île-de-France (region)
- Coordinates: 48°51′26″N 3°19′09″E
- Country: France
- Region: Île-de-France
- Department: Seine-et-Marne
- Arrondissement: Provins
- Canton: Coulommiers

Government
  - Mayor (2020–2026): Frédéric Morel
- Area^{1}: 16.36 km^{2} (6.32 sq mi)
- Highest elevation: 204 m (669 ft)
- Lowest elevation: 83 m (272 ft)
- Population (2023): 777
  - Density: 47.5/km^{2} (123/sq mi)
- Time zone: UTC+01:00 (CET)
  - Summer (DST): UTC+02:00 (CEST)
- INSEE/Postal code: 77030 /77510
- ^{1} French Land Register data, which excludes lakes, ponds, glaciers > 1 km^{2} (0.386 sq mi or 247 acres) and river estuaries.

Bellot (French pronunciation: [bɛlo]) is a commune in the Seine-et-Marne department in the Île-de-France region in north-central France.

== Population ==
Historical population
Year	Pop.	±% p.a.
1968	531	—
1975	487	−1.23%
1982	534	+1.32%
1990	672	+2.91%
1999	706	+0.55%
2007	792	+1.45%
2012	790	−0.05%
2017	774	−0.41%
2023	777	+0.06%
Source: INSEE

== Demographics ==
The inhabitants are called Bellotiers.

== See also ==
- Communes of the Seine-et-Marne department
