= Doue, Seine-et-Marne =

Doue
- Commune
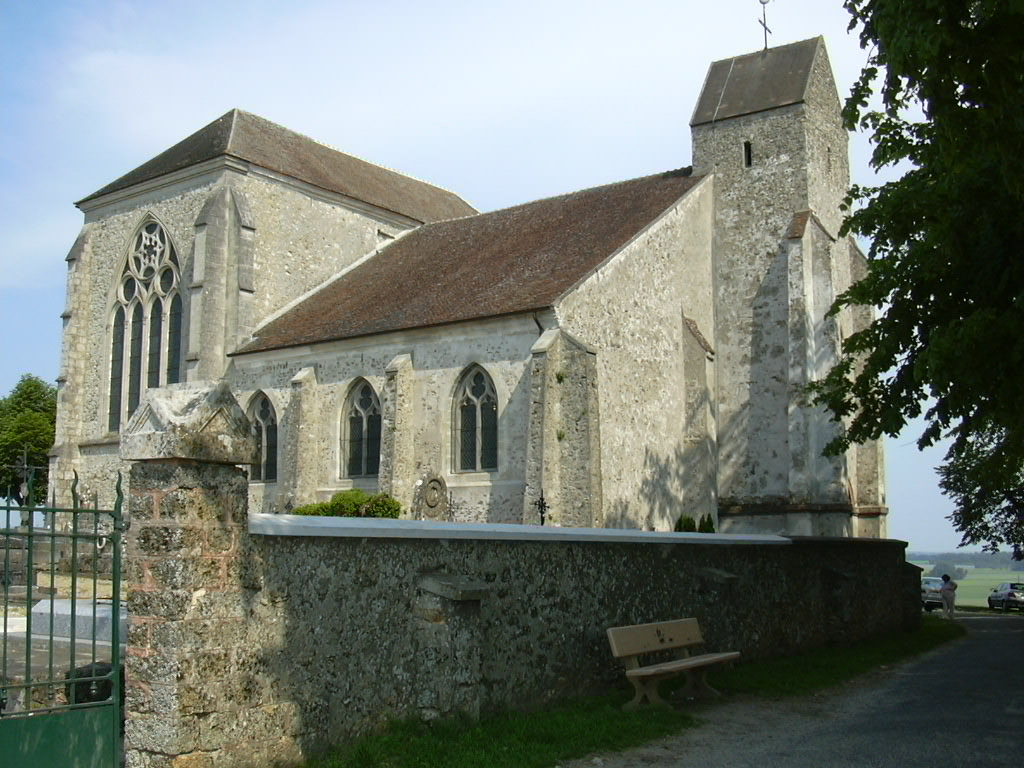
- The church in Doue
- Location of Doue
- Location within France Location within Île-de-France (region)
- Coordinates: 48°51′56″N 3°09′53″E
- Country: France
- Region: Île-de-France
- Department: Seine-et-Marne
- Arrondissement: Provins
- Canton: Coulommiers

Government
  - Mayor (2020–2026): Jean-François Delesalle
- Area^{1}: 20.05 km^{2} (7.74 sq mi)
- Highest elevation: 182 m (597 ft)
- Lowest elevation: 110 m (360 ft)
- Population (2023): 1,122
  - Density: 55.96/km^{2} (144.9/sq mi)
- Time zone: UTC+01:00 (CET)
  - Summer (DST): UTC+02:00 (CEST)
- INSEE/Postal code: 77162 /77510
- ^{1} French Land Register data, which excludes lakes, ponds, glaciers > 1 km^{2} (0.386 sq mi or 247 acres) and river estuaries.

Doue (French pronunciation: [du]) is a commune in the Seine-et-Marne department in the Île-de-France region in north-central France.

== Demographics ==
Inhabitants of Doue are called Dovinciens.

== Geography ==
Doue is located in eastern Paris basin, in the part of the Brie historically known for Brie lousy. The town is located about halfway between Paris (61 km) and Reims (77 km)2.

== See also ==
- Communes of the Seine-et-Marne department
