= Canton of Coulommiers =

Coordinates: 48°48′27″N 3°02′35″E

Coulommiers
- Canton
- Country: France
- Region: Île-de-France
- Department: Seine-et-Marne
- No. of communes: {{{nbcomm}}}
- Area: 627.26 km^{2} (242.19 sq mi)
- Population (2023): 66,326
  - Density: 105.74/km^{2} (273.86/sq mi)
- INSEE code: 77 05

The canton of Coulommiers is a French administrative division, located in the arrondissement of Meaux, in the Seine-et-Marne département (Île-de-France région).

== Demographics ==
Historical population
| Year | Pop. | ±% p.a. |
|---|---|---|
| 2013 | 63,389 | — |
| 2018 | 63,950 | +0.18% |
Source: INSEE

== Composition ==
At the French canton reorganisation which came into effect in March 2015, the canton was expanded from 15 to 50 communes:

- Amillis
- Aulnoy
- Beautheil-Saints
- Bellot
- Boissy-le-Châtel
- Boitron
- La Celle-sur-Morin
- Chailly-en-Brie
- La Chapelle-Moutils
- Chartronges
- Chauffry
- Chevru
- Choisy-en-Brie
- Coulommiers
- Dagny
- Doue
- La Ferté-Gaucher
- Giremoutiers
- Hautefeuille
- Hondevilliers
- Jouy-sur-Morin
- Lescherolles
- Leudon-en-Brie
- Maisoncelles-en-Brie
- Marolles-en-Brie
- Mauperthuis
- Meilleray
- Montdauphin
- Montenils
- Montolivet
- Mouroux
- Orly-sur-Morin
- Pézarches
- Rebais
- Sablonnières
- Saint-Augustin
- Saint-Barthélemy
- Saint-Cyr-sur-Morin
- Saint-Denis-lès-Rebais
- Saint-Germain-sous-Doue
- Saint-Léger
- Saint-Mars-Vieux-Maisons
- Saint-Martin-des-Champs
- Saint-Ouen-sur-Morin
- Saint-Rémy-la-Vanne
- Saint-Siméon
- Touquin
- La Trétoire
- Verdelot
- Villeneuve-sur-Bellot

== See also ==
- Cantons of the Seine-et-Marne department
- Communes of the Seine-et-Marne department
