= Březí =

Březí may refer to places in the Czech Republic:

- Březí (Břeclav District), a municipality and village in the South Moravian Region
- Březí (Prague-East District), a municipality and village in the Central Bohemian Region
- Březí (Strakonice District), a municipality and village in the South Bohemian Region
- Březí (Žďár nad Sázavou District), a municipality and village in the Vysočina Region
- Březí, a village and part of Čachrov in the Plzeň Region
- Březí, a village and part of Ctiboř (Tachov District) in the Plzeň Region
- Březí, a village and part of Dražíč in the South Bohemian Region
- Březí, a village and part of Kamenice nad Lipou in the South Bohemian Region
- Březí, a village and part of Kamenný Újezd (České Budějovice District) in the South Bohemian Region
- Březí, a village and part of Kluky (Písek District) in the South Bohemian Region
- Březí, a village and part of Kovářov in the South Bohemian Region
- Březí, a village and part of Malečov in the Ústí nad Labem Region
- Březí, a village and part of Meclov in the Plzeň Region
- Březí, a village and part of Nechvalice in the Central Bohemian Region
- Březí, a village and part of Pernarec in the Plzeň Region
- Březí, a village and part of Slabčice in the South Bohemian Region
- Březí, a village and part of Trhové Sviny in the South Bohemian Region
- Březí, a village and part of Zbýšov (Kutná Hora District) in the Central Bohemian Region
- Březí, a village and part of Zhoř (Písek District) in the South Bohemian Region
- Březí, a village and part of Žinkovy in the Plzeň Region
- Březí nad Oslavou, a municipality and village in the Vysočina Region
- Březí u Týna nad Vltavou, a former village and part of Temelín in the South Bohemian Region
- Vlachovo Březí, a town in the South Bohemian Region
