= Brie (disambiguation) =

Brie is a variety of soft cheese.

Brie may also refer to:

== People ==
- Brie (name)

== Places ==
- Brie (region), the region from which brie cheese originated
- Brie, Aisne, a commune in the Aisne département
- Brie, Ariège, a commune in the Ariège département
- Brie, Charente, a commune in the Charente département
- Brie, Deux-Sèvres, a commune in the Deux-Sèvres département
- Brie, Ille-et-Vilaine, a commune in the Ille-et-Vilaine département
- Brie, Somme, a commune in the Somme département

== See also ==
- Bree (disambiguation)
- Bries (disambiguation)
- Armentières-en-Brie, in the Seine-et-Marne département
- Augers-en-Brie, in the Seine-et-Marne département
- Baulne-en-Brie, in the Aisne département
- Brie-Comte-Robert, in the Seine-et-Marne département
- Brie-sous-Archiac, in the Charente-Maritime département
- Brie-sous-Barbezieux, in the Charente département
- Brie-sous-Chalais, in the Charente département
- Brie-sous-Matha, in the Charente-Maritime département
- Brie-sous-Mortagne, in the Charente-Maritime département
- Chailly-en-Brie, in the Seine-et-Marne département
- Chanteloup-en-Brie, in the Seine-et-Marne département
- Chaumes-en-Brie, in the Seine-et-Marne département
- Choisy-en-Brie, in the Seine-et-Marne département
- Condé-en-Brie, in the Aisne département
- Crèvecœur-en-Brie, in the Seine-et-Marne département
- Ferrières-en-Brie, in the Seine-et-Marne département
- Fontenelle-en-Brie, in the Aisne département
- La Croix-en-Brie, in the Seine-et-Marne département
- La Houssaye-en-Brie, in the Seine-et-Marne département
- La Queue-en-Brie, in the Val-de-Marne département
- Laval-en-Brie, in the Seine-et-Marne département
- Le Châtelet-en-Brie, in the Seine-et-Marne département
- Leudon-en-Brie, in the Seine-et-Marne département
- Liverdy-en-Brie, in the Seine-et-Marne département
- Loisy-en-Brie, in the Marne département
- Maisoncelles-en-Brie, in the Seine-et-Marne département
- Marchais-en-Brie, in the Aisne département
- Mareuil-en-Brie, in the Marne département
- Marles-en-Brie, in the Seine-et-Marne département
- Marolles-en-Brie, Seine-et-Marne, in the Seine-et-Marne département
- Marolles-en-Brie, Val-de-Marne, in the Val-de-Marne département
- Neufmoutiers-en-Brie, in the Seine-et-Marne département
- Presles-en-Brie, in the Seine-et-Marne département
- Reuil-en-Brie, in the Seine-et-Marne département
- Roissy-en-Brie, in the Seine-et-Marne département
- Rozay-en-Brie, in the Seine-et-Marne département
- Saint-Just-en-Brie, in the Seine-et-Marne département
- Saint-Ouen-en-Brie, in the Seine-et-Marne département
- Soignolles-en-Brie, in the Seine-et-Marne département
- Sucy-en-Brie, in the Val-de-Marne département
- Tournan-en-Brie, in the Seine-et-Marne département
- Valence-en-Brie, in the Seine-et-Marne département
- Vaudoy-en-Brie, in the Seine-et-Marne département
