= Communauté de communes des Deux Morin =

French federation of municipalities

Deux Morin
- Communauté de communes
- Country: France
- Region: {{{region}}}
- Department: {{{department}}}
- No. of communes: {{{nbcomm}}}
- Established: 1 January 2017
- Area: 394.20 km^{2} (152.20 sq mi)
- Population (2020): 26,590
  - Density: 67.45/km^{2} (174.7/sq mi)

The Communauté de communes Deux Morin is a French federation of municipalities (communauté de communes) located in the Seine-et-Marne department in the Île-de-France region.

== History ==
As part of the provisions of the law on the new territorial organization of the Republic (Loi NOTRe) of August 7, 2015, which requires that inter-municipal cooperation public bodies with their own tax system must have a minimum of 15,000 inhabitants (and 5,000 inhabitants in mountain areas), the prefect of Seine-et-Marne approved a new departmental scheme of inter-municipal cooperation (SDCI) which notably provides for the merger of the communities of communes of la Brie des Morin and Cœur de la Brie.

Thus, the communauté de communes des Deux Morin was created on January 1, 2017, by prefectural decree of December 19, 2016.

It resulted from the merger of the former communities of la Brie des Morin (21 communes) and Cœur de la Brie (10 communes).

== Community territory ==
=== Description ===
The community manages a rural territory located in Seine-et-Marne, on the border between the Île-de-France and Grand Est regions, between the Petit Morin and Grand Morin rivers, which give it its name. This territory is approximately equidistant from the economic centers of Meaux, Provins, Coulommiers, and Château-Thierry.

Economically, it was severely affected by two factory closures in 2019: the Arjowiggins paper mill (220 employees) and the Villeroy & Boch faience factory (113 employees), and lost its railway service in 2002 previously provided by the Gretz-Armainvilliers to Sézanne line, although a reopening project is being considered.

== Composition ==
In 2024, the сommunauté de communes Deux Morin is made up of the following 31 communes:

List of intermunicipal municipalities
Name	INSEE code	Demonym	Area ( km ^{2} )	Population (last legal population )	Density ( inhabitant/km ^{2} )
Bellot	77030	Bellotiers	16.36	774 (2021)	47
Boitron	77043		5.14	328 (2021)	64
Chartronges	77097	Chartrongeais	8.2	300 (2021)	37
Choisy-en-Brie	77116	Choiseans	25.03	1,308 (2021)	52
Doue	77162	Dovinsians	20.05	1,108 (2021)	55
Hondevilliers	77228	Hondeville	5.53	259 (2021)	47
Jouy-sur-Morin	77240	Jouyssiens	18.45	2,212 (2021)	120
La Chapelle-Moutils	77093	Capellomoutillais	18.9	420 (2021)	22
La Ferté-Gaucher (headquarters)	77182	Fertois	17.32	4,820 (2021)	278
Lescherolles	77247	Lescherollais	11.01	435 (2021)	40
Leudon-en-Brie	77250	Leudonais	4.24	165 (2021)	39
Meilleray	77287	Meillerassiens	7.77	502 (2021)	65
Montdauphin	77303	Montdauphinois	9.84	234 (2021)	24
Montenils	77304	Montenilois	5.3	26 (2021)	4.9
Montolivet	77314	Montolivetains	16.37	245 (2021)	15
Orly-sur-Morin	77345	Orlysians	5.87	660 (2021)	112
Rebais	77385	Resbaciens	11.05	2,289 (2021)	207
Saint Barthélemy	77402	Barthelomeans	14.99	338 (2021)	23
Saint-Cyr-sur-Morin	77405	Saint-Cyriens	19.1	1,954 (2021)	102
Saint-Denis-lès-Rebais	77406	Dionysians	15.12	1,012 (2021)	67
Saint-Germain-sous-Doue	77411	Germinois	10.01	557 (2021)	56
Saint-Léger	77417	Léodegendiens	9.63	249 (2021)	26
Saint-Mars-Vieux-Maisons	77421		19.02	252 (2021)	13
Saint-Martin-des-Champs	77423		10.42	657 (2021)	63
Saint-Ouen-sur-Morin	77429	Audonians	3.79	530 (2021)	140
Saint-Rémy-de-la-Vanne	77432	Saint-Rémois	15.07	981 (2021)	65
Saint-Siméon	77436	Saint-Siméonais	12.27	908 (2021)	74
Sablonnières	77398	Sablonnierois	13.98	745 (2021)	53
La Trétoire	77472	Tretorians	9.28	479 (2021)	52
Verdelot	77492	Verdelotais	25.6	634 (2021)	25
Villeneuve-sur-Bellot	77512	Villeneuvois	9.52	1,136 (2021)	119
