= Bries =

Bries may refer to:

- German name of Brezno, Slovakia
- German name of Březí (Prague-East District), Czech Republic

== See also ==
- Brie (disambiguation)
- Březno (disambiguation)
- Březí (disambiguation)
