= Brie (name) =

Brie is both a feminine given name and a surname (last name). Notable people with the name include:

== Given name ==
- Brie Gertler, American philosopher
- Brie Howard-Darling (born 1949), American musician and actress
- Brie Rogers Lowery, British business executive and political activist
- Brie Rippner (born 1980), American retired tennis player
- Alison Brie Schermerhorn, known as Alison Brie (born 1982), American actress

== Surname ==
- André Brie (born 1950), German politician
- Alison Brie (born 1982), American actress

== Stage name ==
- Brie Bella, ring name of one of the Bella Twins, a professional wrestling tag team
- Brie Larson (born Brianne Sidonie Desaulniers, 1989), American actress and pop singer

== See also ==
- Bree (name)
