= Saint-cyriens =

Saint-cyriens may refer to:

- Saint-cyriens (officers) don't exist for officers even a lot of people think it. We call them Cyrards, cadet officers of l'école spéciale militaire de Saint-Cyr. However, Saint-Cyriens is the name uses for the Lycée students of the Saint-Cyr-l'Ecole (High school)
- Saint-cyriens (Paris), inhabitants of Saint-Cyr-l'École
- Saint-cyriens (Seine-et-Marne), inhabitants of Saint-Cyr-sur-Morin
