= Baulne-en-Brie =

- Part of Vallées-en-Champagne
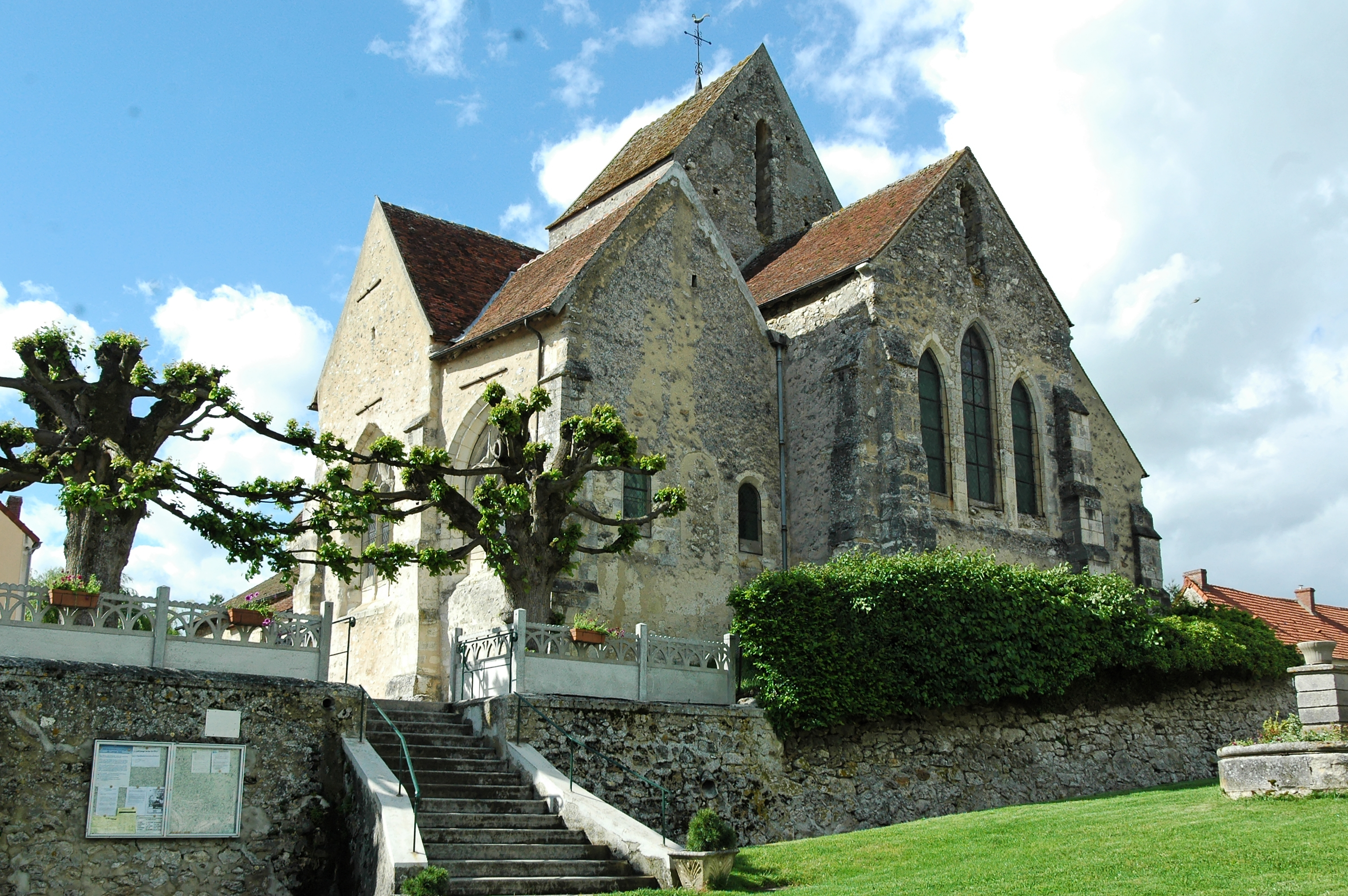
- Location of Baulne-en-Brie
- Location within France Location within Hauts-de-France
- Coordinates: 48°59′16″N 3°36′53″E
- Country: France
- Region: Hauts-de-France
- Department: Aisne
- Arrondissement: Château-Thierry
- Canton: Condé-en-Brie
- Commune: Vallées-en-Champagne
- Area^{1}: 18.89 km^{2} (7.29 sq mi)
- Elevation: 100 m (330 ft)
- Highest elevation: 243 m (797 ft)
- Lowest elevation: 82 m (269 ft)
- Population (2021): 289
  - Density: 15.3/km^{2} (39.6/sq mi)
- Time zone: UTC+01:00 (CET)
  - Summer (DST): UTC+02:00 (CEST)
- Postal code: 02330
- ^{1} French Land Register data, which excludes lakes, ponds, glaciers > 1 km^{2} (0.386 sq mi or 247 acres) and river estuaries.

Baulne-en-Brie (French pronunciation: [bo(l)n ɑ̃ bʁi], literally Baulne in Brie) is a former commune in the department of Aisne in northern France. On 1 January 2016, it was merged into the new commune Vallées-en-Champagne, of which it is a delegated commune.

== Geography ==
Baulne-en-Brie is located some 15 km east by south-east of Château-Thierry and 20 km west by south-west of Épernay. It can be accessed by the D4 road from Condé-en-Brie in the west through the heart of the commune and the village and continuing east to Le Breuil. There is also a country road from La Chapelle-Monthodon in the north. The south-eastern border of the commune is part of the border between the departments of Aisne and Marne. There are three hamlets in the commune other than the village: Montchevret, Grande Fontaine, and Romandie. There are extensive forests in the north, centre, south-east and south of the commune with the rest of the area being farmland.

The Verdonnelle stream flows north-west through the southern part of the commune passing near the hamlet of Romandie and continuing north-west out of the commune. The Surmelin stream flows from the south-east passing through the village and continuing north-west to join the Marne near Mézy-Moulins.

== Administration ==
List of Successive Mayors of Baulne-en-Brie

From	To	Name	Party
2001	2008	Gilles Hiernard	DVD
2008	2016	Bruno Lahouati	

== Demography ==
Historical population

Year	Pop.	±% p.a.
1793	428	—
1800	515	+2.68%
1806	572	+1.76%
1821	589	+0.20%
1831	637	+0.79%
1836	628	−0.28%
1841	673	+1.39%
1846	730	+1.64%
1851	724	−0.16%
1856	702	−0.62%
1861	639	−1.86%
1866	633	−0.19%
1872	562	−1.96%
1876	537	−1.13%
1881	504	−1.26%
1886	512	+0.32%
1891	527	+0.58%

Year	Pop.	±% p.a.
1896	510	−0.65%
1901	442	−2.82%
1906	420	−1.02%
1911	440	+0.93%
1921	380	−1.46%
1926	371	−0.48%
1931	334	−2.08%
1936	347	+0.77%
1946	299	−1.48%
1954	268	−1.36%
1962	256	−0.57%
1968	220	−2.49%
1975	194	−1.78%
1982	243	+3.27%
1990	219	−1.29%
1999	238	+0.93%
2021	289	+0.89%

Source: EHESS and INSEE

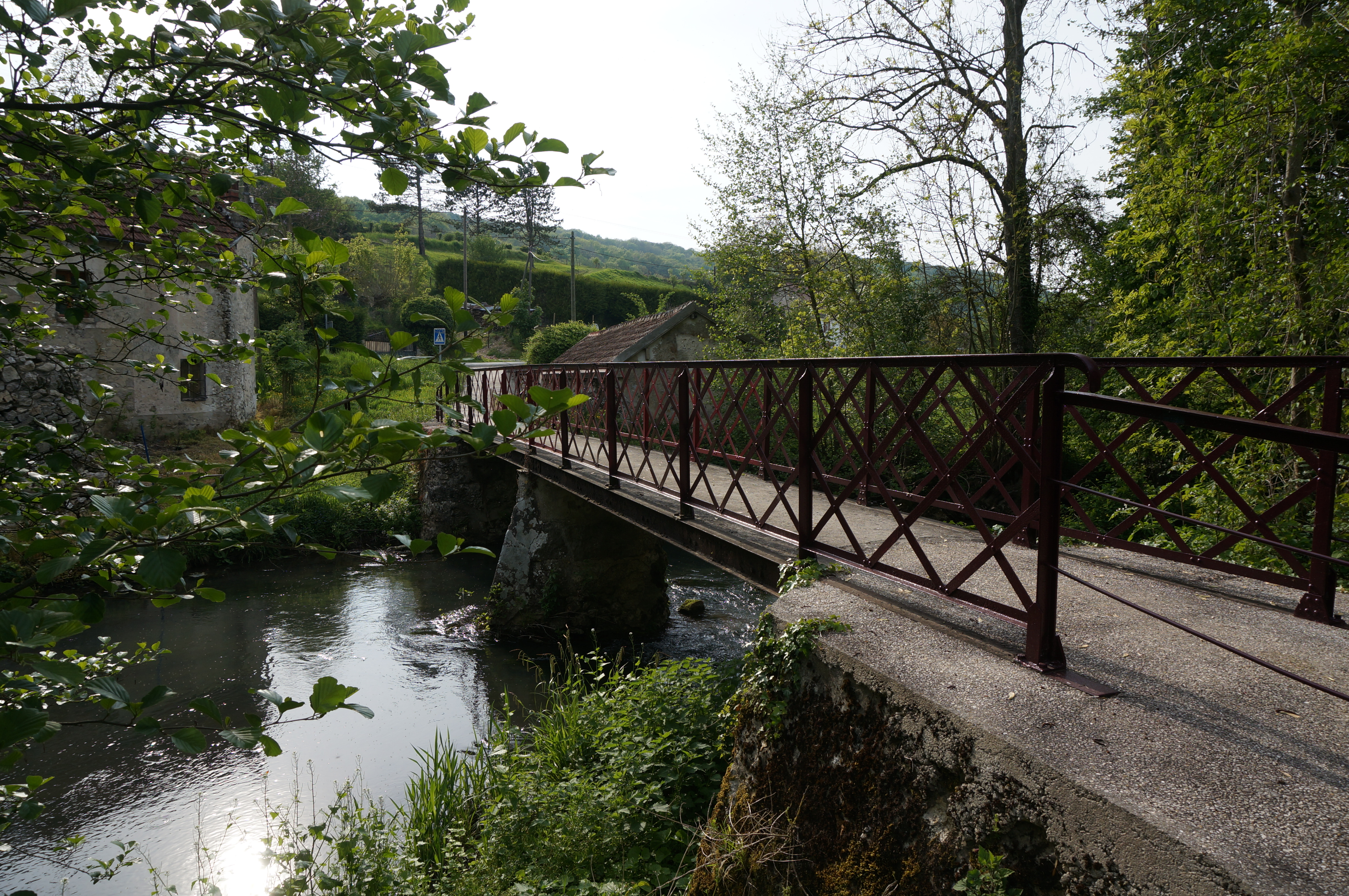
The Surmelin River at Baulne-en-Brie

== Economy ==
Baulne-en-Brie is an agricultural and wine-producing village and a part of the Appellation d'origine contrôlée (AOC) zone for "Champagne of Aisne".

== Culture and heritage ==
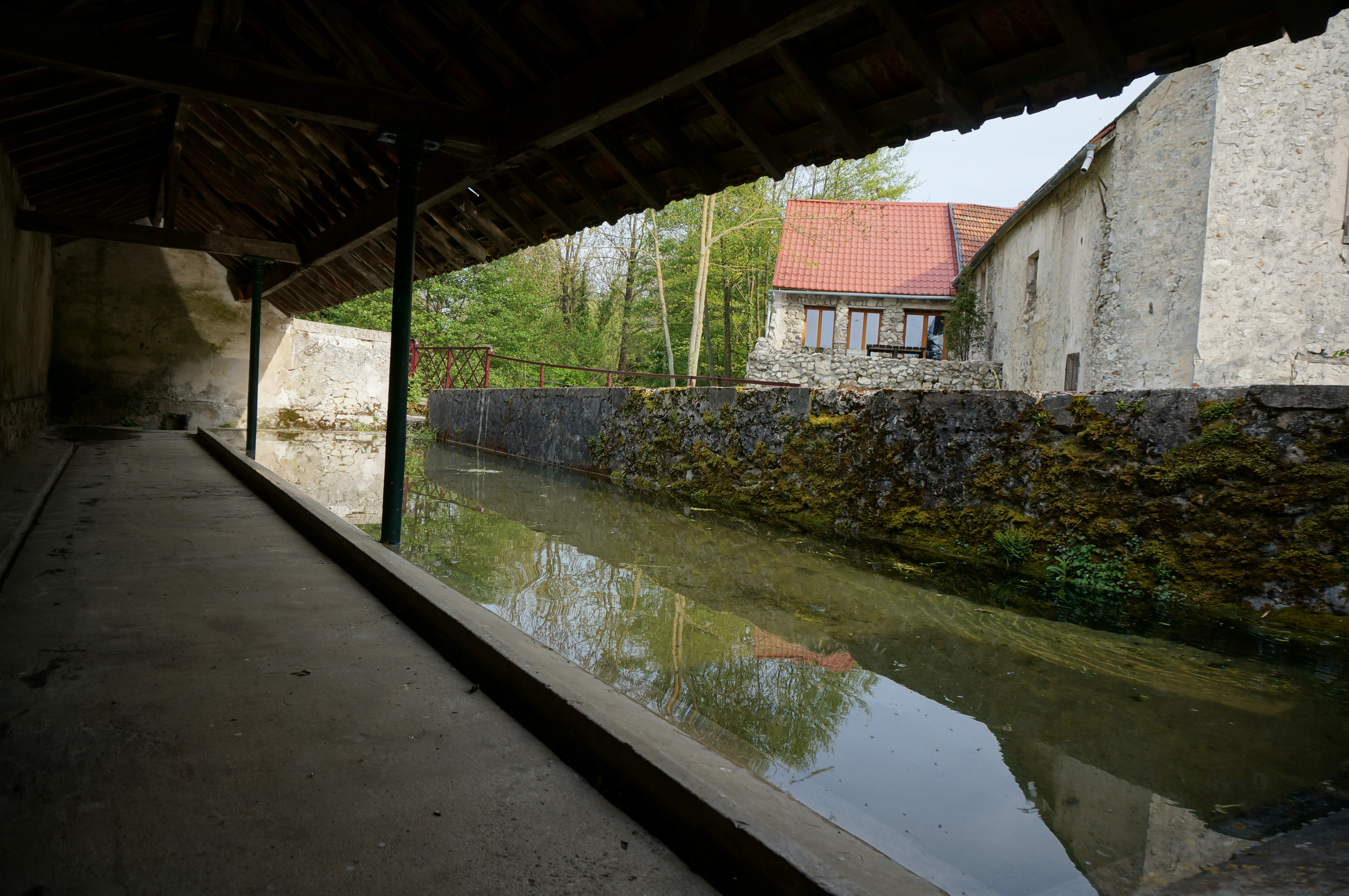
Next to the river at Baulne-en-Brie

=== Civil heritage ===
The commune has two sites that are registered as historical monuments:

- The Madame Max Park
- The Chateau Park

Other sites of interest

- The Place Daniel Beaucreux in front of the church. In memory of the men and women of the Canton of Condé-en-Brie and the region who experienced deportation and death in the Nazi concentration camps. Marked: "Dead in Deportation, alive in our memories".
- A Lavoir (Public laundry) in the main street has been decorated on the theme of the fable "The dairy and milk jug".
- Little Switzerland of Condé, the area around the hamlet of Romandie, gives access to the Verdonnelle valley.
- A Directional table opposite the Chemin de Glapiers on the road to Saint-Agnan offers an outstanding view of the Surmelin valley.

=== Religious heritage ===
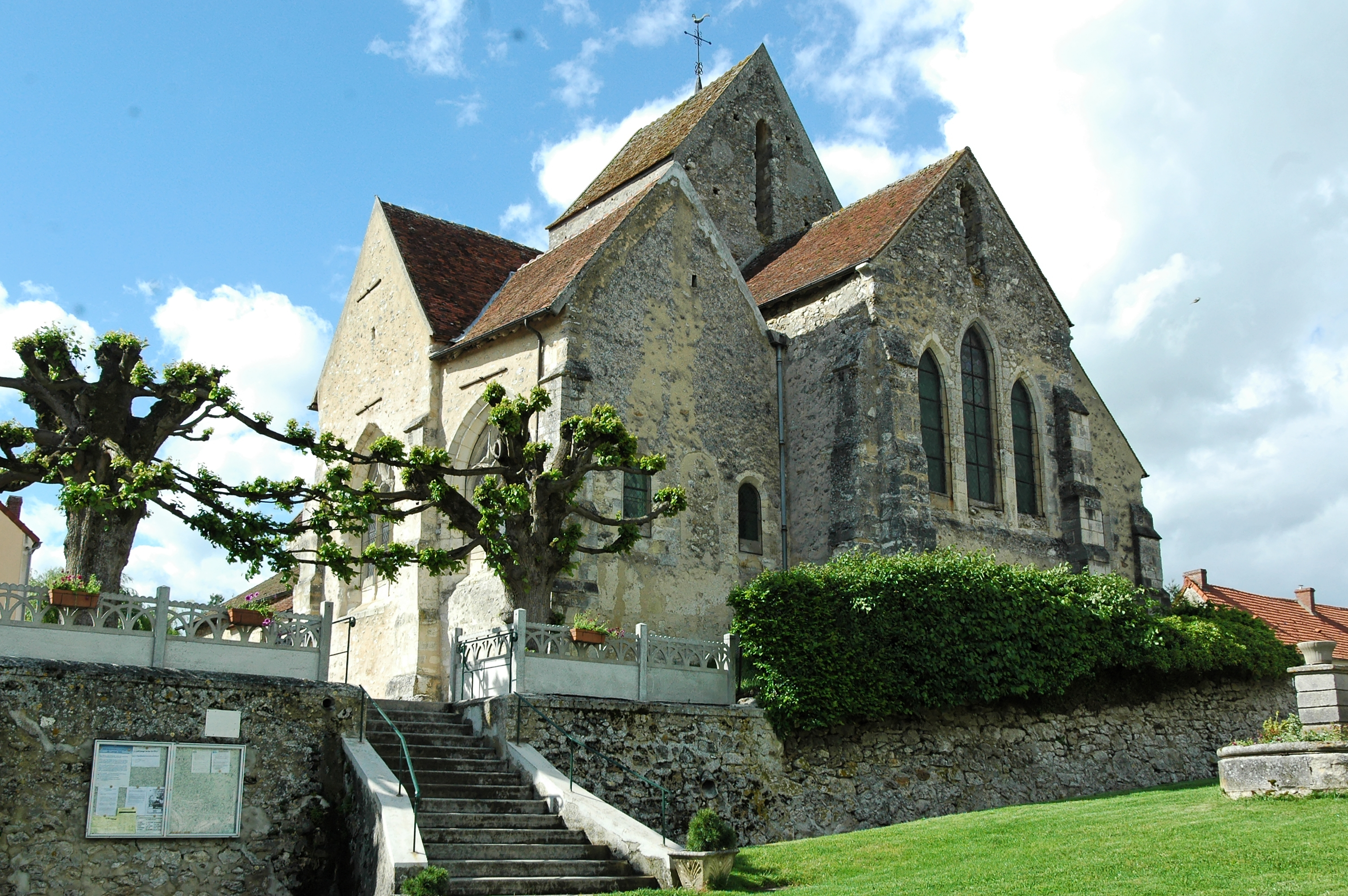
The Church of Saint Bartholomew

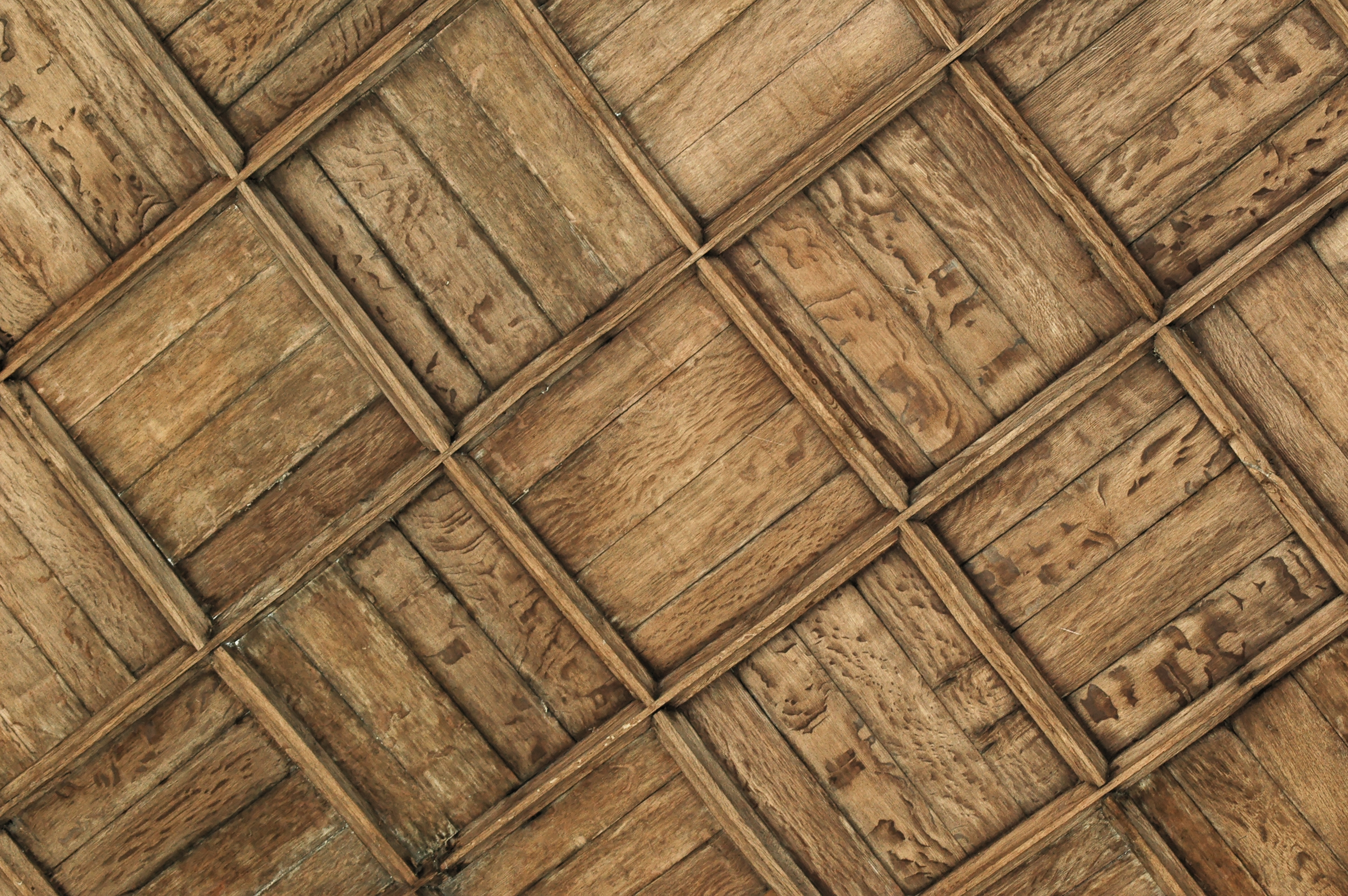
Detail of the ceiling of the church

The commune has several religious buildings and structures that are registered as historical monuments:

- The Church of Saint Bartholomew (12th century). It has one of the last wooden ceilings with alternating grain slats in the world. The Church contains three items that are registered as historical objects:
  - A Funeral Plaque of Madeleine de Castellan, widow of Louis Mallart, Counsellor to the King (1633)
  - The Tombstone of Guillaume de Baulne (1255)
  - A Pulpit with 3 Bas-reliefs (16th century)

== See also ==
- Communes of the Aisne department
