= Bree =

Bree may refer to:

== Places ==
- Bree, Belgium, a municipality
- Brée, a commune in the Mayenne department in France
- Bree, County Wexford, Ireland, a village
- Maasbree, Netherlands, a town formerly called Bree
- Breede River, also known as the Breë River, Western Cape Province, South Africa

== People and fictional characters ==
- Bree (name), a list of people and fictional characters with the given name, nickname or surname
- Bree Olson, stage name of American pornographic actress Rachel Oberlin (born 1986)

== Other uses ==
- Bree (Middle-earth), a fictional village in J. R. R. Tolkien's Middle-earth
- Bree BBC, a professional basketball team from Belgium

== See also ==
- Brie (disambiguation)
