= Sablonnières =

- Commune
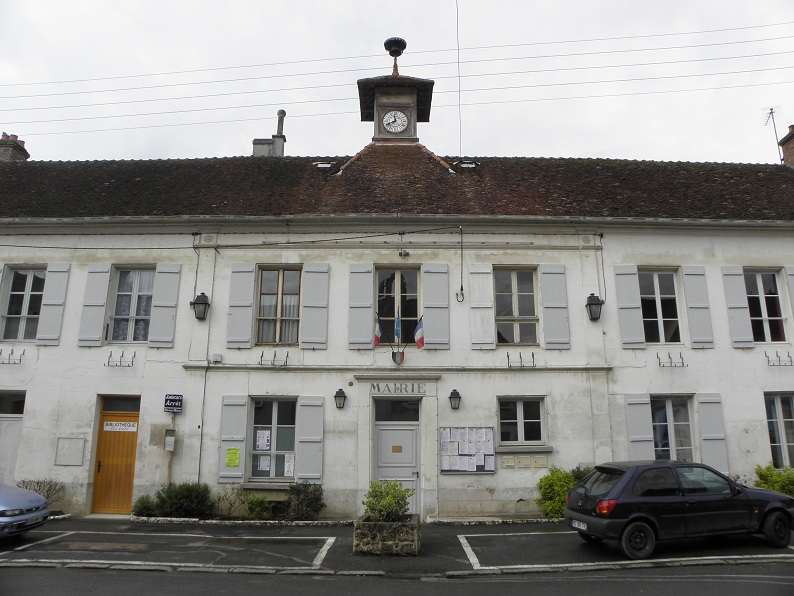
- The town hall in Sablonnières

- Coat of arms
- Location of Sablonnières
- Location within France Location within Île-de-France (region)
- Coordinates: 48°52′32″N 3°17′47″E
- Country: France
- Region: Île-de-France
- Department: Seine-et-Marne
- Arrondissement: Provins
- Canton: Coulommiers
- Intercommunality: Deux Morin

Government
  - Mayor (2020–2026): Frédérique Demaison
- Area^{1}: 13.98 km^{2} (5.40 sq mi)
- Highest elevation: 192 m (630 ft)
- Lowest elevation: 75 m (246 ft)
- Population (2023): 791
  - Density: 56.6/km^{2} (147/sq mi)
- Time zone: UTC+01:00 (CET)
  - Summer (DST): UTC+02:00 (CEST)
- INSEE/Postal code: 77398 /77510
- ^{1} French Land Register data, which excludes lakes, ponds, glaciers > 1 km^{2} (0.386 sq mi or 247 acres) and river estuaries.

Sablonnières (French pronunciation: [sablɔnjɛʁ]) is a commune in the Seine-et-Marne department in the Île-de-France region in north-central France.

== Population ==
Historical population
Year	Pop.	±% p.a.
1968	445	—
1975	443	−0.06%
1982	524	+2.43%
1990	595	+1.60%
1999	628	+0.60%
2007	677	+0.94%
2012	701	+0.70%
2017	721	+0.56%
2023	791	+1.56%
Source: INSEE

== See also ==
- Communes of the Seine-et-Marne department
