= Vallées en Champagne =

- Commune
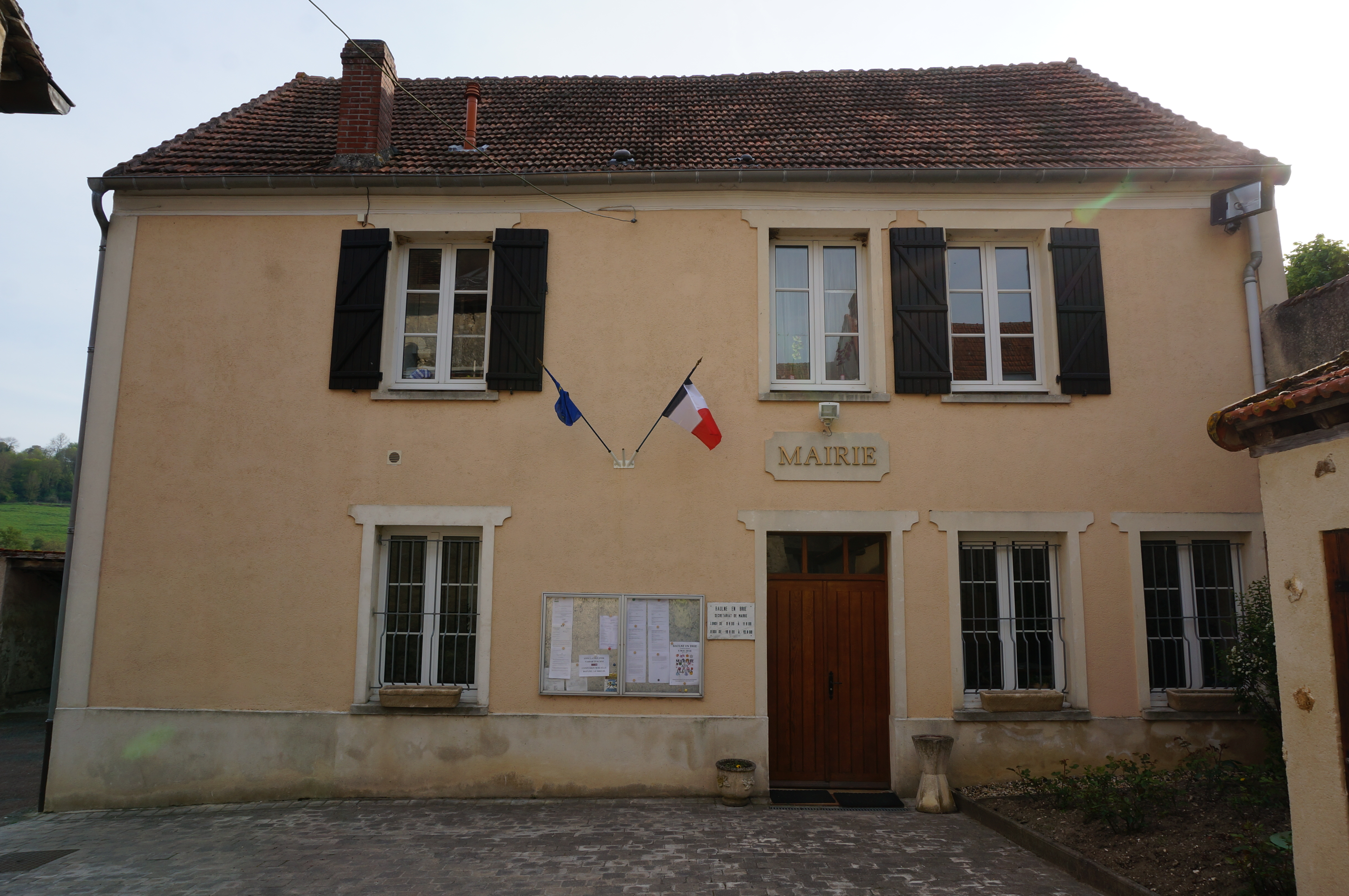
- The town hall of Vallées en Champagne
- Location of Vallées en Champagne
- Location within France Location within Hauts-de-France
- Coordinates: 48°59′13″N 3°36′50″E
- Country: France
- Region: Hauts-de-France
- Department: Aisne
- Arrondissement: Château-Thierry
- Canton: Essômes-sur-Marne
- Intercommunality: CA Région de Château-Thierry

Government
  - Mayor (2026–32): Bruno Lahouati
- Area^{1}: 41.24 km^{2} (15.92 sq mi)
- Population (2023): 599
  - Density: 14.5/km^{2} (37.6/sq mi)
- Time zone: UTC+01:00 (CET)
  - Summer (DST): UTC+02:00 (CEST)
- INSEE/Postal code: 02053 /02330
- ^{1} French Land Register data, which excludes lakes, ponds, glaciers > 1 km^{2} (0.386 sq mi or 247 acres) and river estuaries.

Vallées en Champagne (French pronunciation: [vale ɑ̃ ʃɑ̃paɲ], literally Valleys in Champagne) is a commune in the Aisne department of northern France. The municipality was established on 1 January 2016 and consists of the former communes of Baulne-en-Brie, La Chapelle-Monthodon and Saint-Agnan.

== See also ==
- Communes of the Aisne department
