= La Chapelle-Monthodon =

- Part of Vallées-en-Champagne
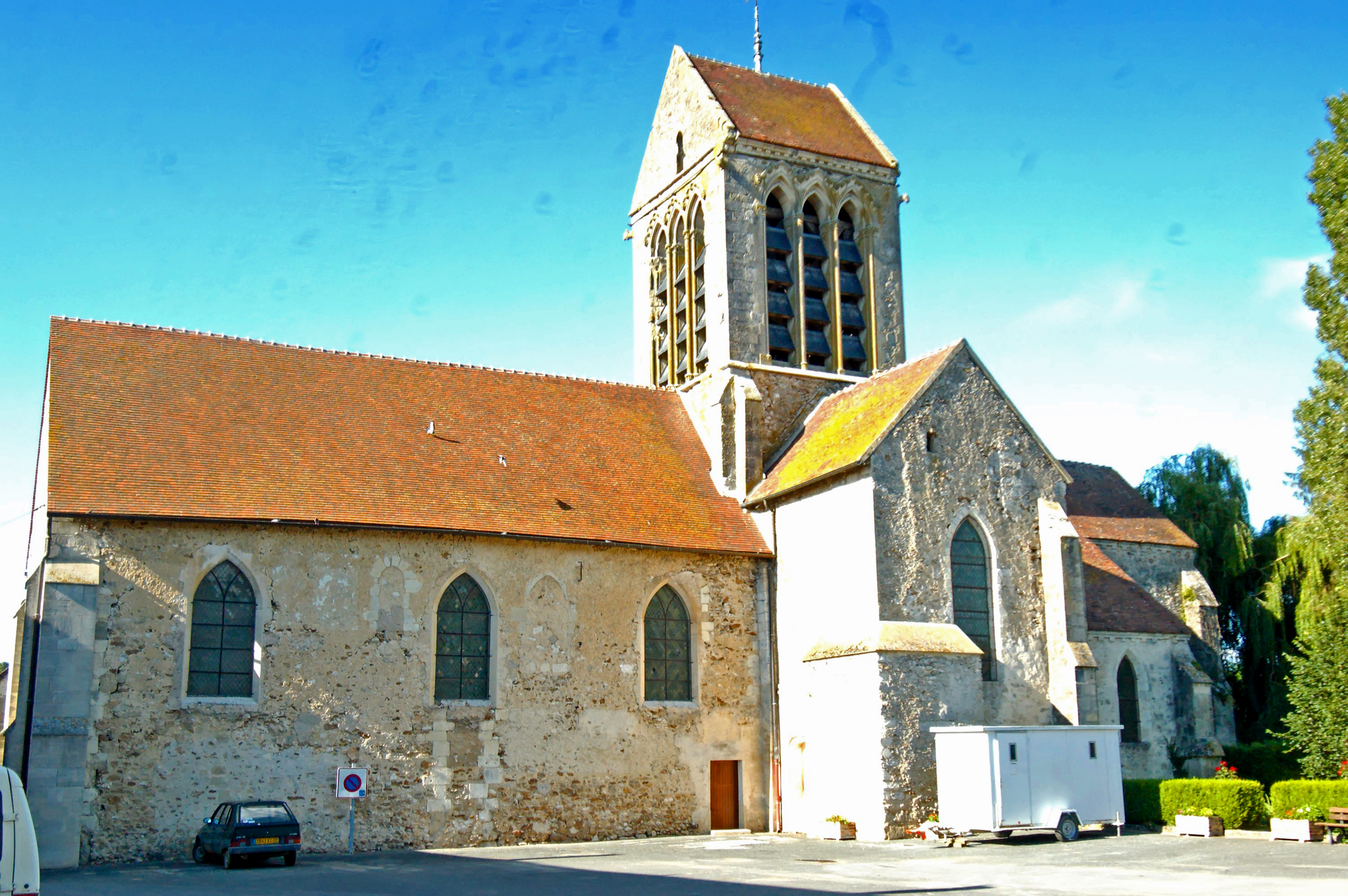
- Location of La Chapelle-Monthodon
- Location within France Location within Hauts-de-France
- Coordinates: 49°01′25″N 3°38′11″E
- Country: France
- Region: Hauts-de-France
- Department: Aisne
- Arrondissement: Château-Thierry
- Canton: Condé-en-Brie
- Commune: Vallées-en-Champagne
- Area^{1}: 14.28 km^{2} (5.51 sq mi)
- Elevation: 113 m (371 ft)
- Highest elevation: 254 m (833 ft)
- Lowest elevation: 112 m (367 ft)
- Population (2021): 199
  - Density: 13.9/km^{2} (36.1/sq mi)
- Time zone: UTC+01:00 (CET)
  - Summer (DST): UTC+02:00 (CEST)
- Postal code: 02330
- ^{1} French Land Register data, which excludes lakes, ponds, glaciers > 1 km^{2} (0.386 sq mi or 247 acres) and river estuaries.

La Chapelle-Monthodon (French pronunciation: [la ʃapɛl mɔ̃tɔdɔ̃]) is a former commune in the department of Aisne in the Hauts-de-France region of northern France. On 1 January 2016, it was merged into the new commune Vallées-en-Champagne.

== See also ==
- Communes of the Aisne department
