= Brie Rogers Lowery =

British businesswoman and political activist

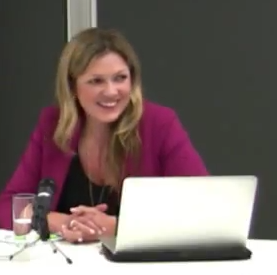
- Brie Rogers Lowery in 2014

UK Director of Change.org

Brie Rogers Lowery is the UK Director of Change.org.

She worked for seven years doing online campaigning. Lowery worked for the Australian online advocacy group GetUp! as well as a number of UK NGOs including Oxfam and the Global Campaign for Education.

Lowery is on the board of directors at Greenpeace Nordic (2015–present) and is also the WIRED Innovation Awards judge for Social Innovation.

She was one of the BBC’s "100 Women" of 2014, named one of the Top 35 Women Under 35 by Management Today and awarded Women of the Future for Technology & Digital in 2014.

In 2016 Lowery's own website said she was the UK Director & Deputy Managing Director, Europe at Change.org.
