= Březí (Žďár nad Sázavou District) =

- Municipality
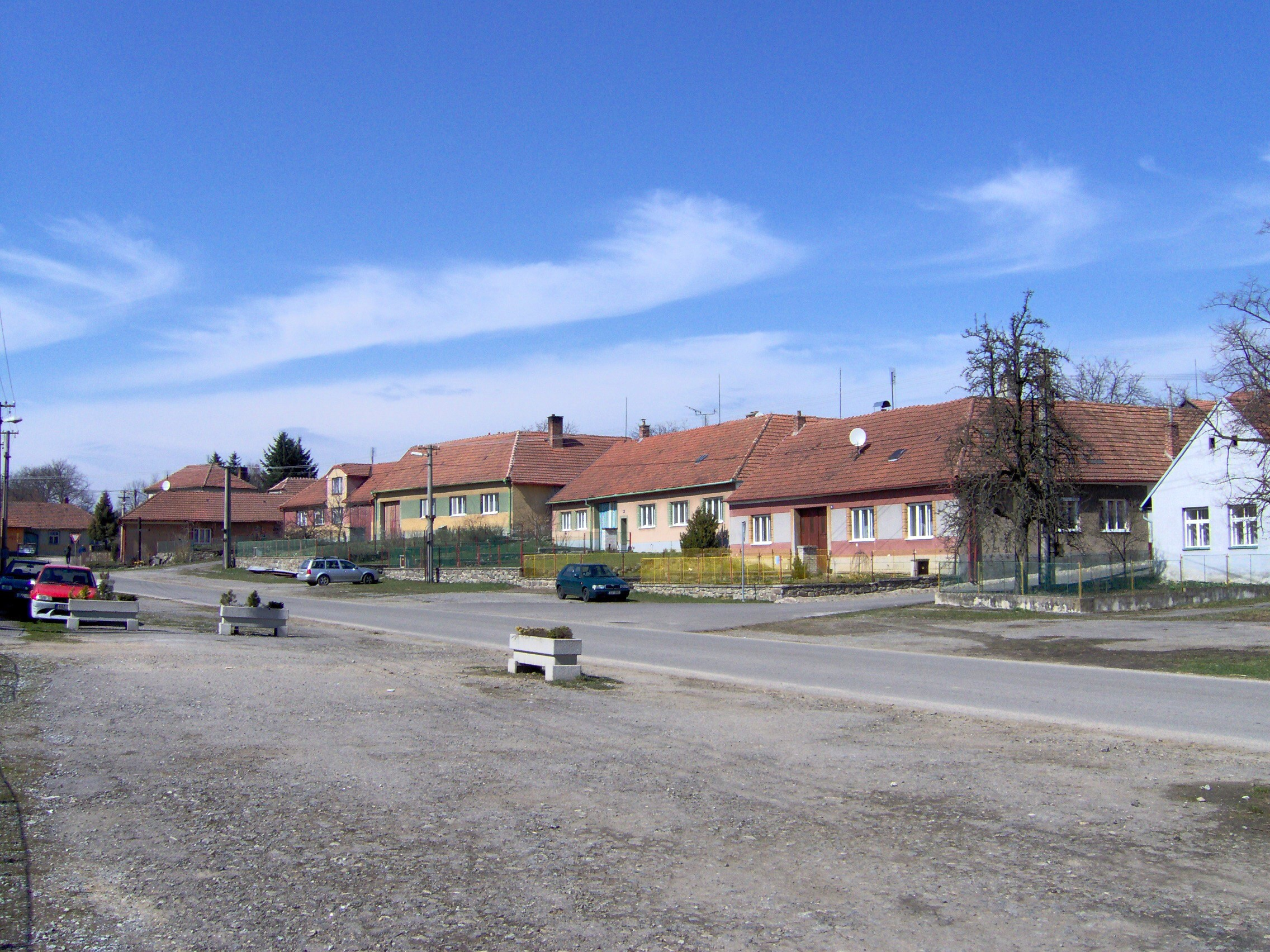
- Centre of Březí

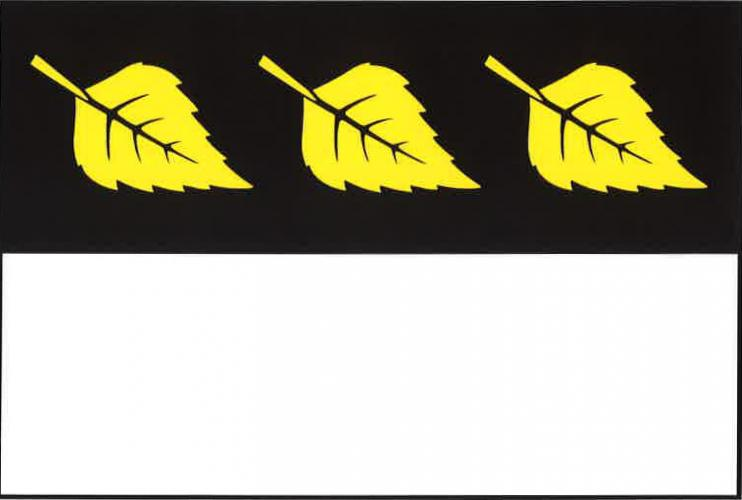
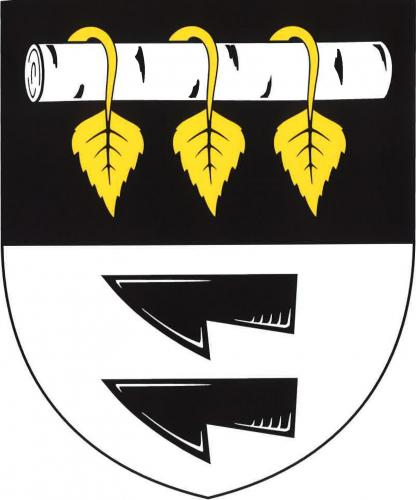
- Flag Coat of arms

- Location in the Czech Republic
- Coordinates: 49°20′36″N 16°12′57″E
- Country: Czech Republic
- Region: Vysočina
- District: Žďár nad Sázavou
- First mentioned: 1348

Area
  - Total: 6.27 km^{2} (2.42 sq mi)
- Elevation: 524 m (1,719 ft)

Population (2026-01-01)
  - Total: 215
  - Density: 34.3/km^{2} (88.8/sq mi)
- Time zone: UTC+1 (CET)
  - Summer (DST): UTC+2 (CEST)
- Postal code: 594 53
- Website: www.brezi.eu

Březí is a municipality and village in Žďár nad Sázavou District in the Vysočina Region of the Czech Republic. It has about 200 inhabitants.

Březí lies approximately 32 kilometres (20 mi) south-east of Žďár nad Sázavou, 46 km (29 mi) east of Jihlava, and 154 km (96 mi) south-east of Prague.

== Administrative division ==
Březí consists of two municipal parts (in brackets population according to the 2021 census):

- Březí (150)
- Ondrušky (26)

== Demographics ==
Historical population
Year	Pop.	±%
1869	475	—
1880	499	+5.1%
1890	422	−15.4%
1900	477	+13.0%
1910	442	−7.3%
1921	432	−2.3%
1930	412	−4.6%
1950	315	−23.5%
1961	299	−5.1%
1970	282	−5.7%
1980	260	−7.8%
1991	221	−15.0%
2001	176	−20.4%
2011	180	+2.3%
2021	176	−2.2%
Source: Censuses
