= Březí (Strakonice District) =

- Municipality
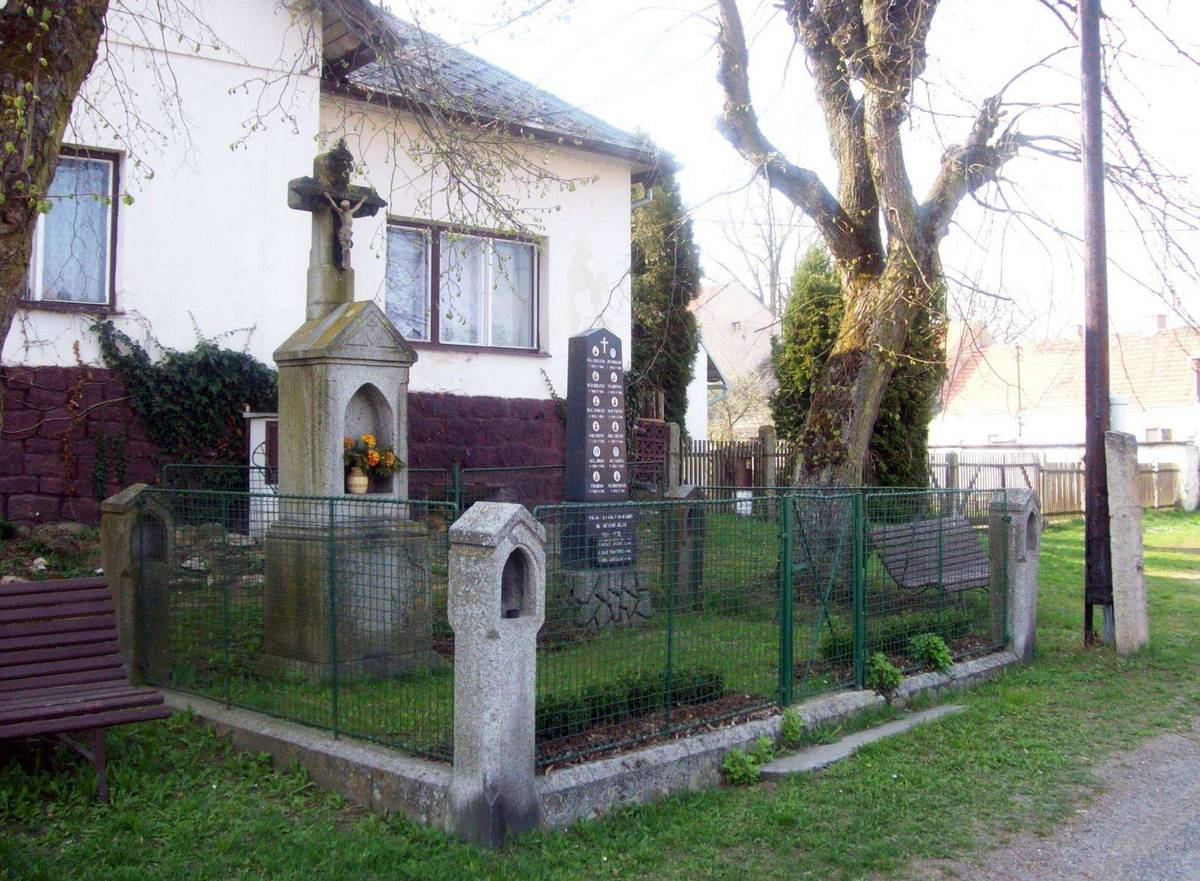
- Monument to the victims of the world wars

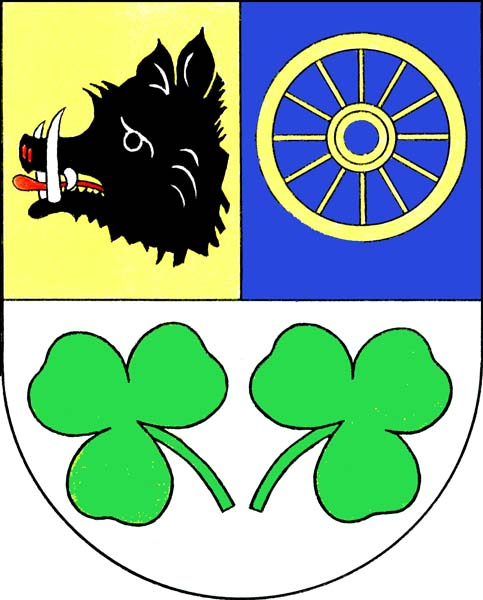
- Flag Coat of arms

- Location in the Czech Republic
- Coordinates: 49°30′28″N 13°47′51″E
- Country: Czech Republic
- Region: South Bohemian
- District: Strakonice
- First mentioned: 1473

Area
  - Total: 5.60 km^{2} (2.16 sq mi)
- Elevation: 518 m (1,699 ft)

Population (2026-01-01)
  - Total: 64
  - Density: 11/km^{2} (30/sq mi)
- Time zone: UTC+1 (CET)
  - Summer (DST): UTC+2 (CEST)
- Postal code: 262 42
- Website: www.brezi-obec.cz

Březí is a municipality and village in Strakonice District in the South Bohemian Region of the Czech Republic. It has about 60 inhabitants.

Březí lies approximately 28 kilometres (17 mi) north of Strakonice, 77 km (48 mi) north-west of České Budějovice, and 79 km (49 mi) south-west of Prague.

== Demographics ==
Historical population
Year	Pop.	±%
1869	382	—
1880	374	−2.1%
1890	377	+0.8%
1900	358	−5.0%
1910	347	−3.1%
1921	338	−2.6%
1930	322	−4.7%
1950	256	−20.5%
1961	208	−18.8%
1970	171	−17.8%
1980	123	−28.1%
1991	102	−17.1%
2001	81	−20.6%
2011	80	−1.2%
2021	59	−26.2%
Source: Censuses
