= Saint-Agnan, Aisne =

Saint-Agnan
- Part of Vallées-en-Champagne
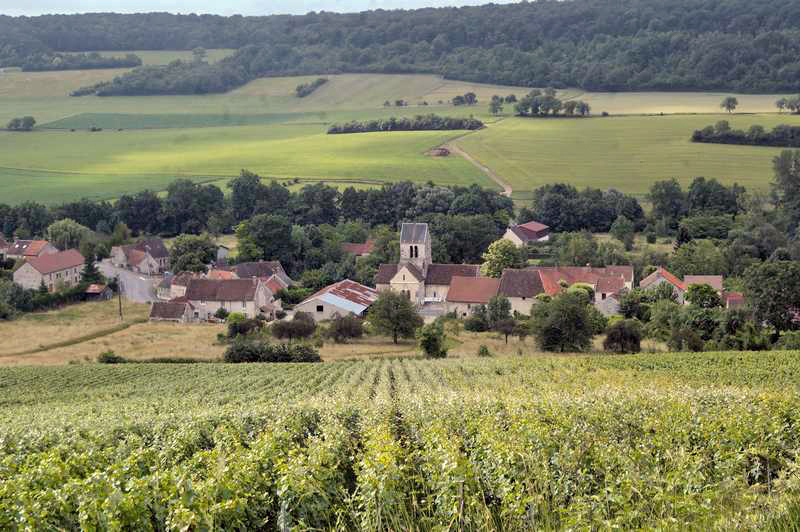
- Location of Saint-Agnan
- Location within France Location within Hauts-de-France
- Coordinates: 49°01′16″N 3°35′44″E
- Country: France
- Region: Hauts-de-France
- Department: Aisne
- Arrondissement: Château-Thierry
- Canton: Condé-en-Brie
- Commune: Vallées-en-Champagne
- Area^{1}: 8.07 km^{2} (3.12 sq mi)
- Elevation: 104 m (341 ft)
- Highest elevation: 242 m (794 ft)
- Lowest elevation: 87 m (285 ft)
- Population (2021): 93
  - Density: 12/km^{2} (30/sq mi)
- Time zone: UTC+01:00 (CET)
  - Summer (DST): UTC+02:00 (CEST)
- Postal code: 02330
- ^{1} French Land Register data, which excludes lakes, ponds, glaciers > 1 km^{2} (0.386 sq mi or 247 acres) and river estuaries.

Saint-Agnan (French pronunciation: [sɛ̃.t‿aɲɑ̃]) is a former commune in the department of Aisne in northern France. On 1 January 2016, it was merged into the new commune Vallées-en-Champagne.

== See also ==
- Communes of the Aisne department
