= Březí nad Oslavou =

- Municipality
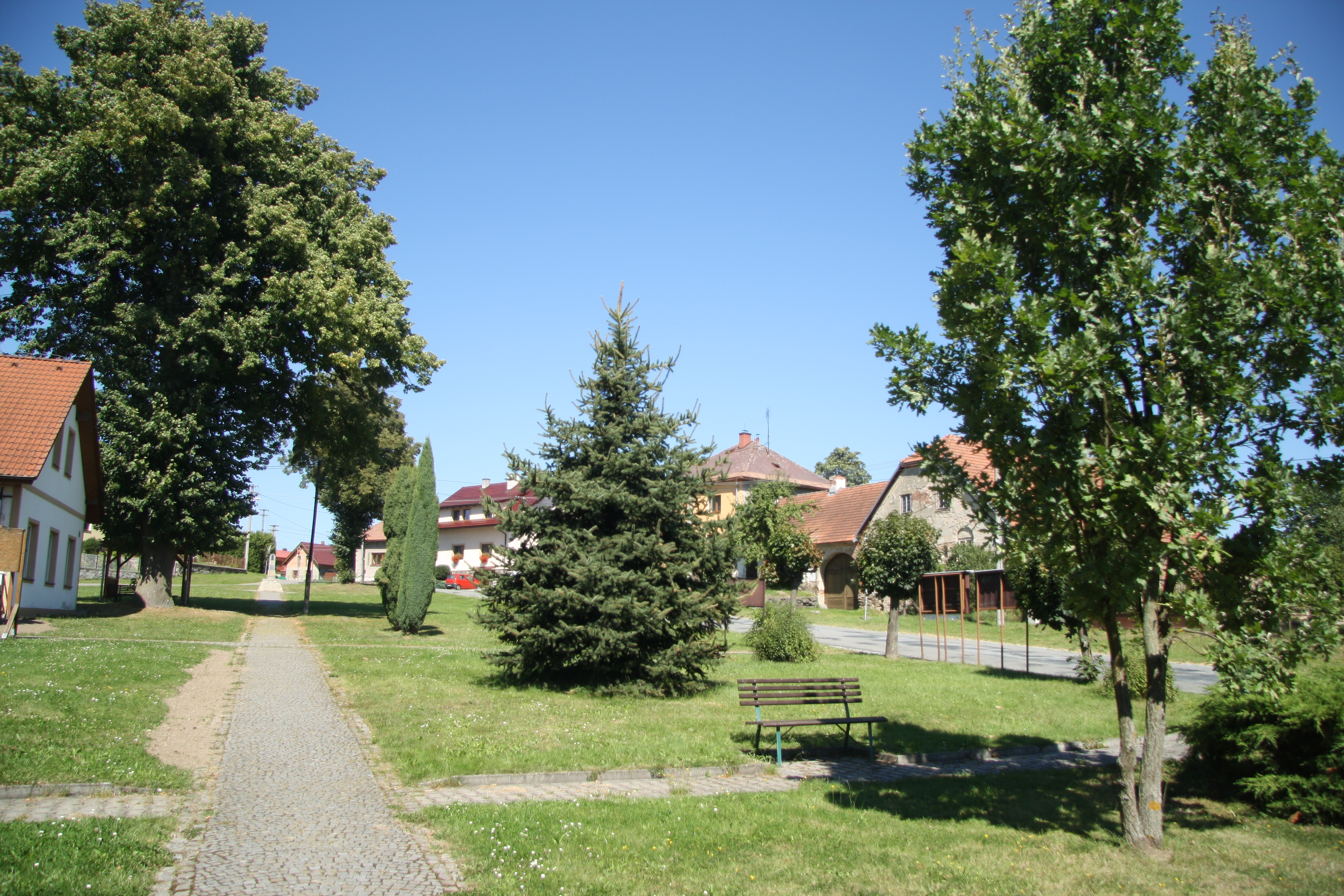
- Centre of Březí nad Oslavou

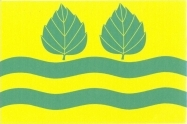
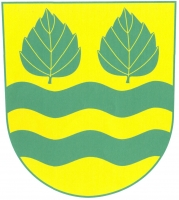
- Flag Coat of arms

- Location in the Czech Republic
- Coordinates: 49°30′11″N 15°56′8″E
- Country: Czech Republic
- Region: Vysočina
- District: Žďár nad Sázavou
- First mentioned: 1447

Area
  - Total: 6.16 km^{2} (2.38 sq mi)
- Elevation: 548 m (1,798 ft)

Population (2026-01-01)
  - Total: 280
  - Density: 45/km^{2} (120/sq mi)
- Time zone: UTC+1 (CET)
  - Summer (DST): UTC+2 (CEST)
- Postal code: 592 14
- Website: obec-brezinadoslavou.cz

Březí nad Oslavou is a municipality and village in Žďár nad Sázavou District in the Vysočina Region of the Czech Republic. It has about 300 inhabitants.

Březí nad Oslavou lies approximately 7 kilometres (4 mi) south of Žďár nad Sázavou, 28 km (17 mi) north-east of Jihlava, and 127 km (79 mi) south-east of Prague.

== Demographics ==
Historical population
Year	Pop.	±%
1869	276	—
1880	354	+28.3%
1890	324	−8.5%
1900	360	+11.1%
1910	316	−12.2%
1921	324	+2.5%
1930	311	−4.0%
1950	253	−18.6%
1961	233	−7.9%
1970	244	+4.7%
1980	249	+2.0%
1991	221	−11.2%
2001	208	−5.9%
2011	244	+17.3%
2021	298	+22.1%
Source: Censuses
