= Choisy-en-Brie =

- Commune
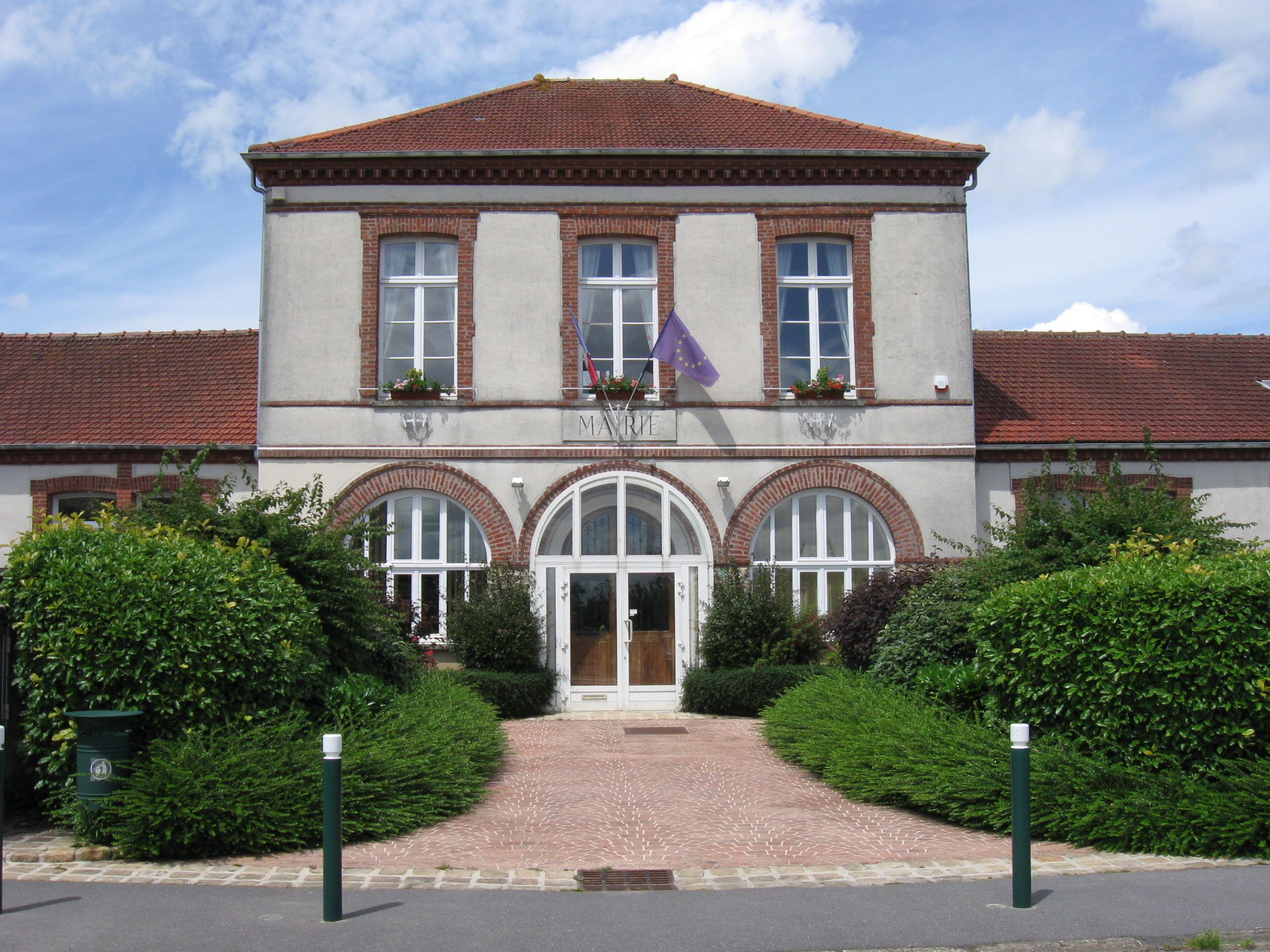
- The town hall in Choisy-en-Brie

- Coat of arms
- Location of Choisy-en-Brie
- Location within France Location within Île-de-France (region)
- Coordinates: 48°45′30″N 3°13′13″E
- Country: France
- Region: Île-de-France
- Department: Seine-et-Marne
- Arrondissement: Provins
- Canton: Coulommiers
- Intercommunality: CC des Deux Morin

Government
  - Mayor (2020–2026): Daniel Talfumier
- Area^{1}: 25.03 km^{2} (9.66 sq mi)
- Highest elevation: 156 m (512 ft)
- Lowest elevation: 135 m (443 ft)
- Population (2023): 1,354
  - Density: 54.10/km^{2} (140.1/sq mi)
- Demonym: Choiséens
- Time zone: UTC+01:00 (CET)
  - Summer (DST): UTC+02:00 (CEST)
- INSEE/Postal code: 77116 /77320
- ^{1} French Land Register data, which excludes lakes, ponds, glaciers > 1 km^{2} (0.386 sq mi or 247 acres) and river estuaries.

Choisy-en-Brie (French pronunciation: [ʃwazi ɑ̃ bʁi]; lit. 'Choisy-in-Brie') is a rural commune in the Seine-et-Marne department in the Île-de-France region in northern France.

== Demographics ==
The inhabitants are called Choiséens.

== See also ==
- Communes of the Seine-et-Marne department
