= Zhoř (Písek District) =

- Municipality
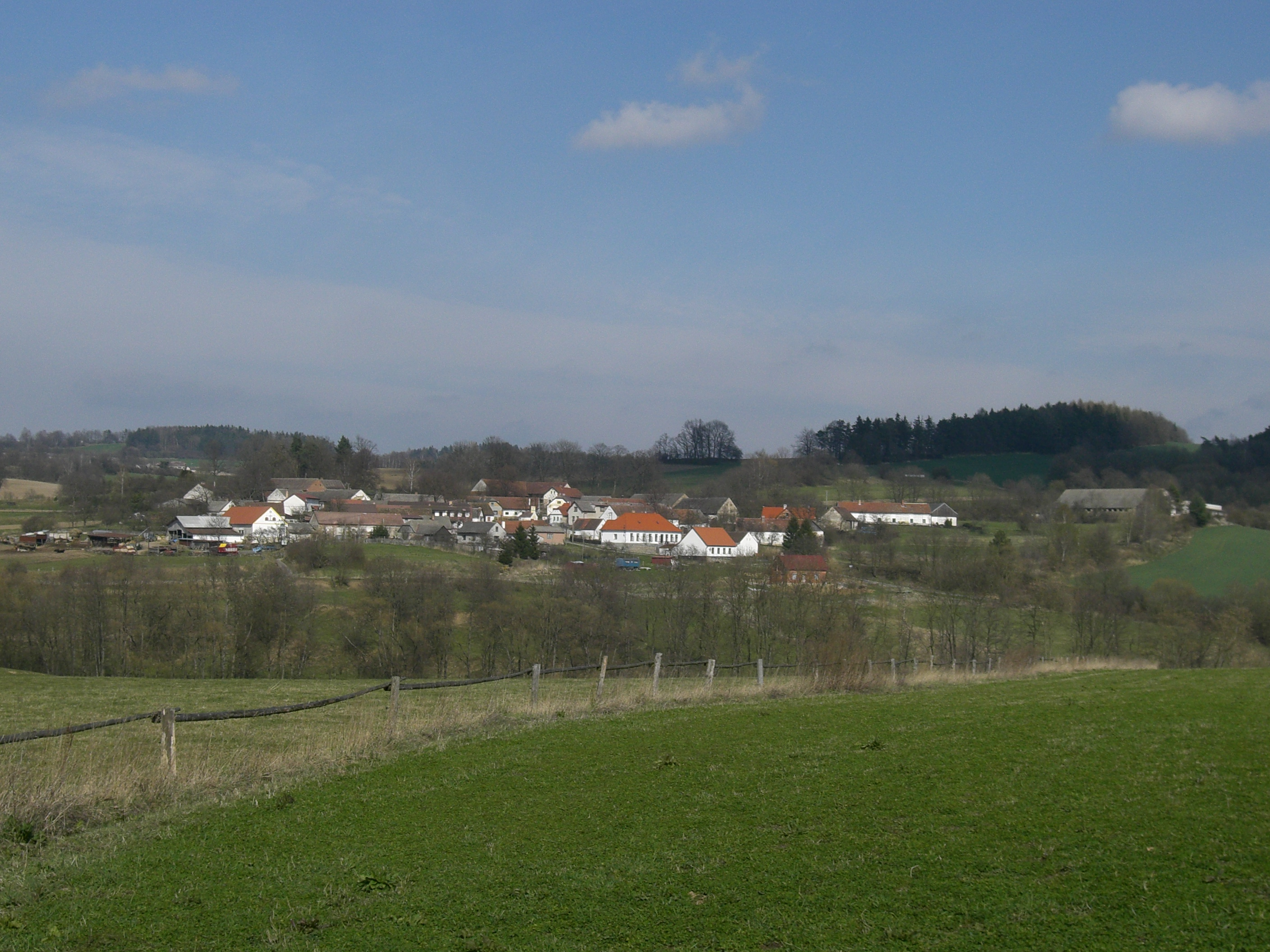
- Zbislav, a part of Zhoř

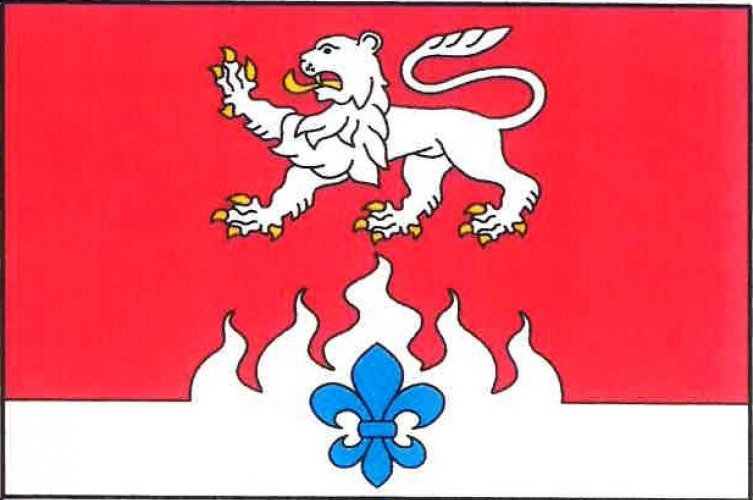
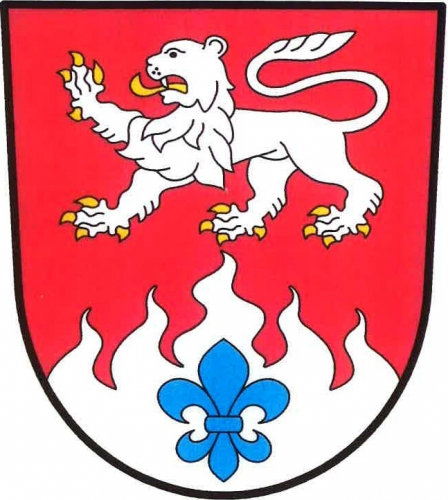
- Flag Coat of arms

- Location in the Czech Republic
- Coordinates: 49°30′5″N 14°22′58″E
- Country: Czech Republic
- Region: South Bohemian
- District: Písek
- First mentioned: 1392

Area
  - Total: 12.15 km^{2} (4.69 sq mi)
- Elevation: 563 m (1,847 ft)

Population (2026-01-01)
  - Total: 313
  - Density: 25.8/km^{2} (66.7/sq mi)
- Time zone: UTC+1 (CET)
  - Summer (DST): UTC+2 (CEST)
- Postal code: 399 01
- Website: www.obec-zhor.cz

Zhoř is a municipality and village in Písek District in the South Bohemian Region of the Czech Republic. It has about 300 inhabitants.

Zhoř lies approximately 29 kilometres (18 mi) north-east of Písek, 59 km (37 mi) north of České Budějovice, and 66 km (41 mi) south of Prague.

== Administrative division ==
Zhoř consists of five municipal parts (in brackets population according to the 2021 census):

- Zhoř (123)
- Blehov (65)
- Březí (55)
- Osletín (15)
- Zbislav (50)

== Demographics ==
Historical population
Year	Pop.	±%
1869	739	—
1880	755	+2.2%
1890	748	−0.9%
1900	672	−10.2%
1910	624	−7.1%
1921	665	+6.6%
1930	605	−9.0%
1950	478	−21.0%
1961	421	−11.9%
1970	414	−1.7%
1980	328	−20.8%
1991	273	−16.8%
2001	290	+6.2%
2011	263	−9.3%
2021	308	+17.1%
Source: Censuses
