= Kluky (Písek District) =

- Municipality
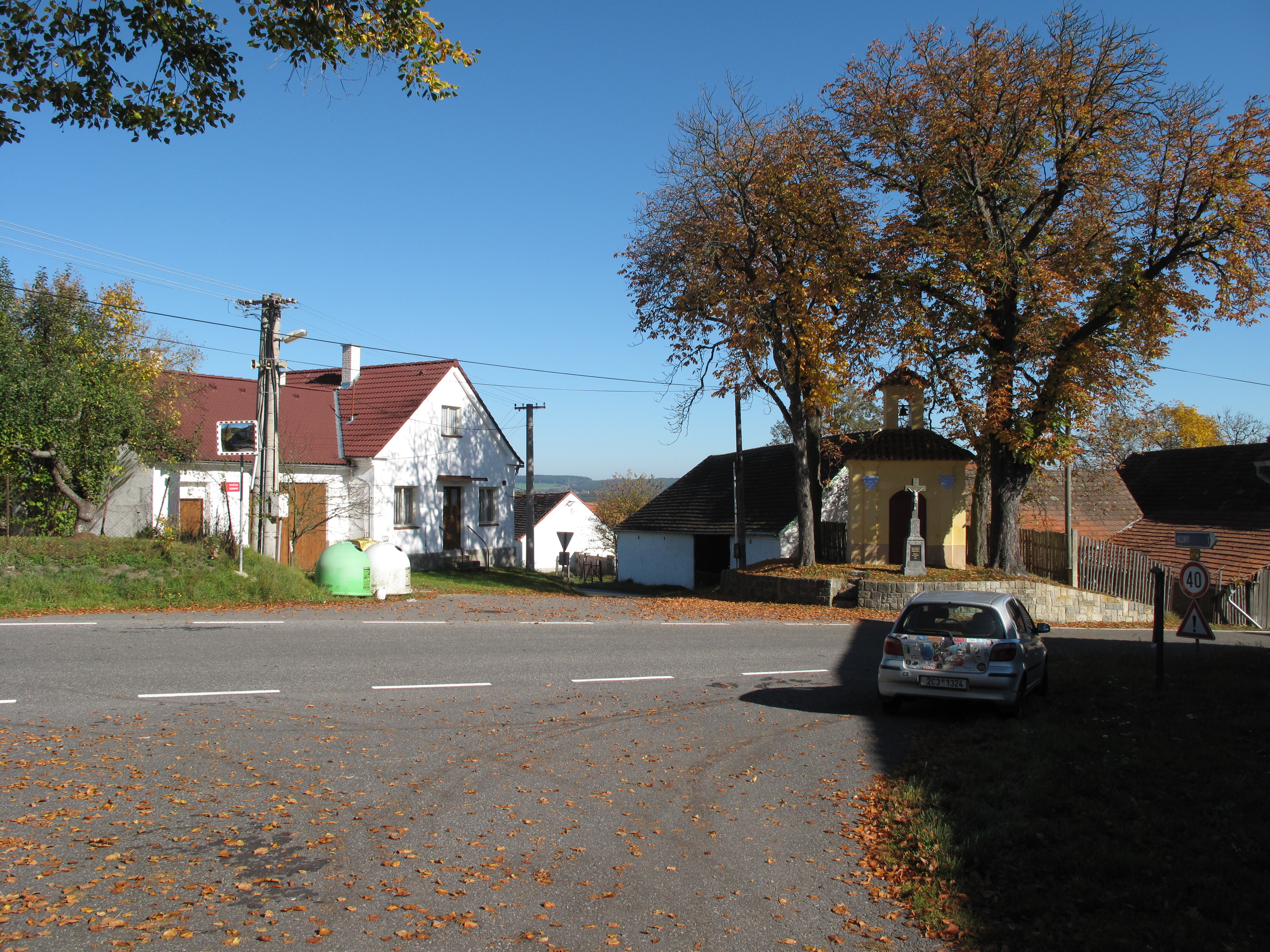
- Dobešice, a part of Kluky

- Flag Coat of arms

- Location in the Czech Republic
- Coordinates: 49°19′0″N 14°14′43″E
- Country: Czech Republic
- Region: South Bohemian
- District: Písek
- First mentioned: 1323

Area
  - Total: 13.61 km^{2} (5.25 sq mi)
- Elevation: 460 m (1,510 ft)

Population (2026-01-01)
  - Total: 618
  - Density: 45.4/km^{2} (118/sq mi)
- Time zone: UTC+1 (CET)
  - Summer (DST): UTC+2 (CEST)
- Postal code: 398 19
- Website: www.obeckluky.cz

Kluky is a municipality and village in Písek District in the South Bohemian Region of the Czech Republic. It has about 600 inhabitants.

Kluky lies approximately 9 kilometres (6 mi) east of Písek, 42 km (26 mi) north-west of České Budějovice, and 87 km (54 mi) south of Prague.

== Administrative division ==
Kluky consists of three municipal parts (in brackets population according to the 2021 census):

- Kluky (513)
- Březí (59)
- Dobešice (32)

== Etymology ==
The name is derived from the old Czech word kluk, which denoted stumps and root networks, but also a plot full of these tree remains.

== Demographics ==
Historical population
Year	Pop.	±%
1869	1,094	—
1880	1,018	−6.9%
1890	1,114	+9.4%
1900	1,157	+3.9%
1910	1,088	−6.0%
1921	1,044	−4.0%
1930	970	−7.1%
1950	814	−16.1%
1961	792	−2.7%
1970	710	−10.4%
1980	574	−19.2%
1991	496	−13.6%
2001	507	+2.2%
2011	575	+13.4%
2021	604	+5.0%
Source: Censuses
