= Saint-Mars-Vieux-Maisons =

- Commune
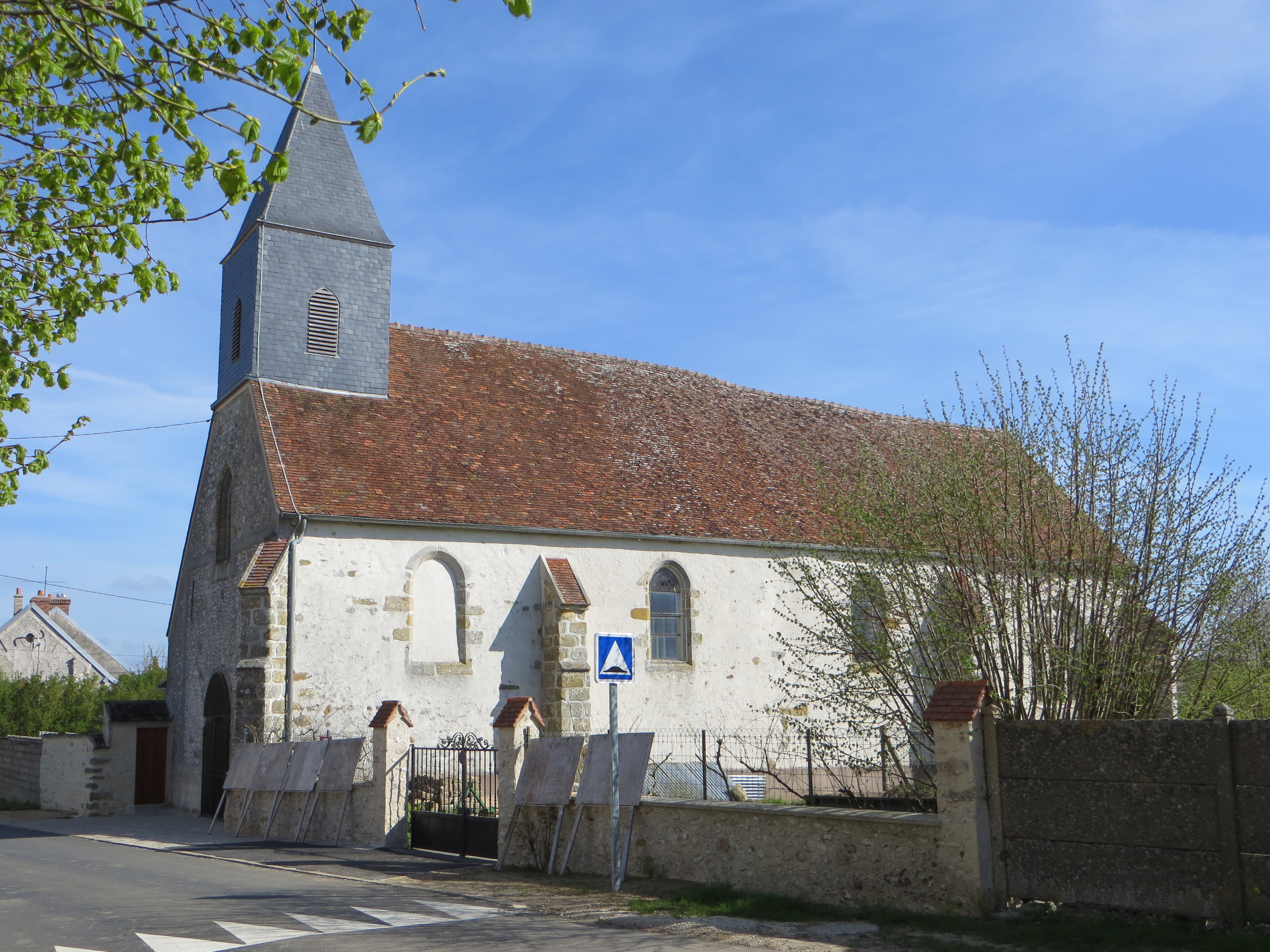
- The church in Saint-Mars-Vieux-Maisons
- Location of Saint-Mars-Vieux-Maisons
- Location within France Location within Île-de-France (region)
- Coordinates: 48°44′33″N 3°19′16″E
- Country: France
- Region: Île-de-France
- Department: Seine-et-Marne
- Arrondissement: Provins
- Canton: Coulommiers

Government
  - Mayor (2020–2026): Patrick Pettinger
- Area^{1}: 19.02 km^{2} (7.34 sq mi)
- Highest elevation: 183 m (600 ft)
- Lowest elevation: 130 m (430 ft)
- Population (2023): 244
  - Density: 12.8/km^{2} (33.2/sq mi)
- Time zone: UTC+01:00 (CET)
  - Summer (DST): UTC+02:00 (CEST)
- INSEE/Postal code: 77421 /77320
- ^{1} French Land Register data, which excludes lakes, ponds, glaciers > 1 km^{2} (0.386 sq mi or 247 acres) and river estuaries.

Saint-Mars-Vieux-Maisons (French pronunciation: [sɛ̃ maʁ vjø mɛzɔ̃]) is a commune in the Seine-et-Marne department in the Île-de-France region in north-central France.

== See also ==
- Gilles de Vieux-Maisons
- Communes of the Seine-et-Marne department
