= Petit Morin =

River in France

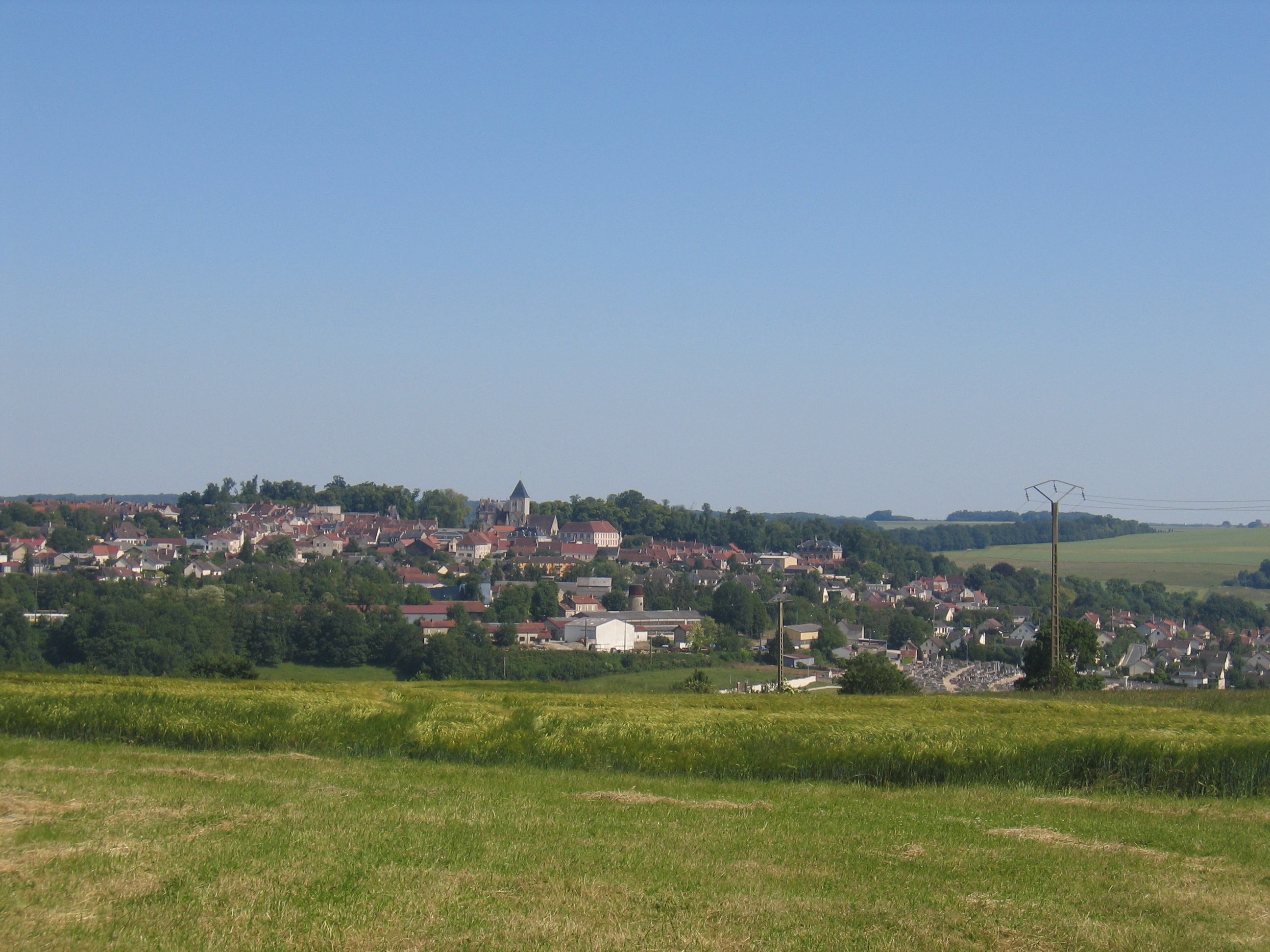

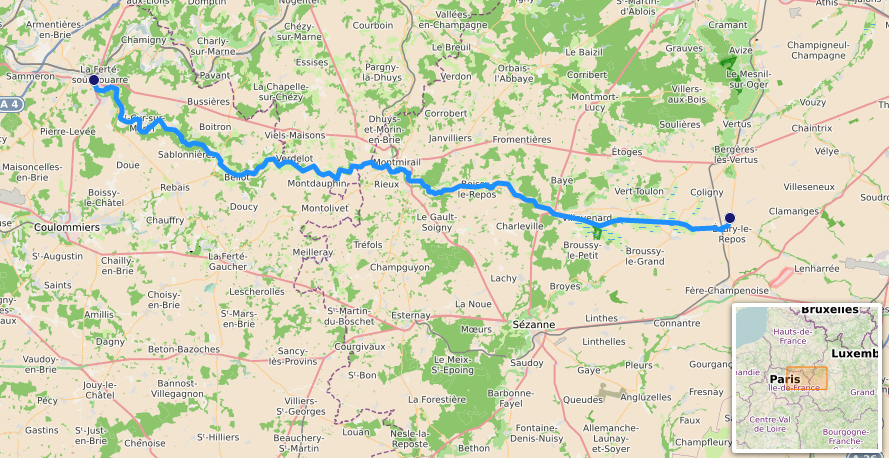
- Path of the Petit Morin

Location
- Country: France

Physical characteristics
- Source
  - location: Champagne
- Mouth
  - location: Marne
  - coordinates: 48°56′38″N 3°7′20″E
- Length: 86 km (53 mi)

Basin features
- Progression: Marne→ Seine→ English Channel

The Petit Morin (French pronunciation: [pəti mɔʁɛ̃], literally Little Morin) is an 86 km-long (53 mi) river in France, a left tributary of the Marne. Its source is in the commune Val-des-Marais. Its course crosses the departments of Marne, Aisne and Seine-et-Marne. It flows westwards through the towns of Montmirail, Villeneuve-sur-Bellot, Saint-Cyr-sur-Morin and Jouarre, finally flowing into the Marne in La Ferté-sous-Jouarre.
