= André Brie =

German politician

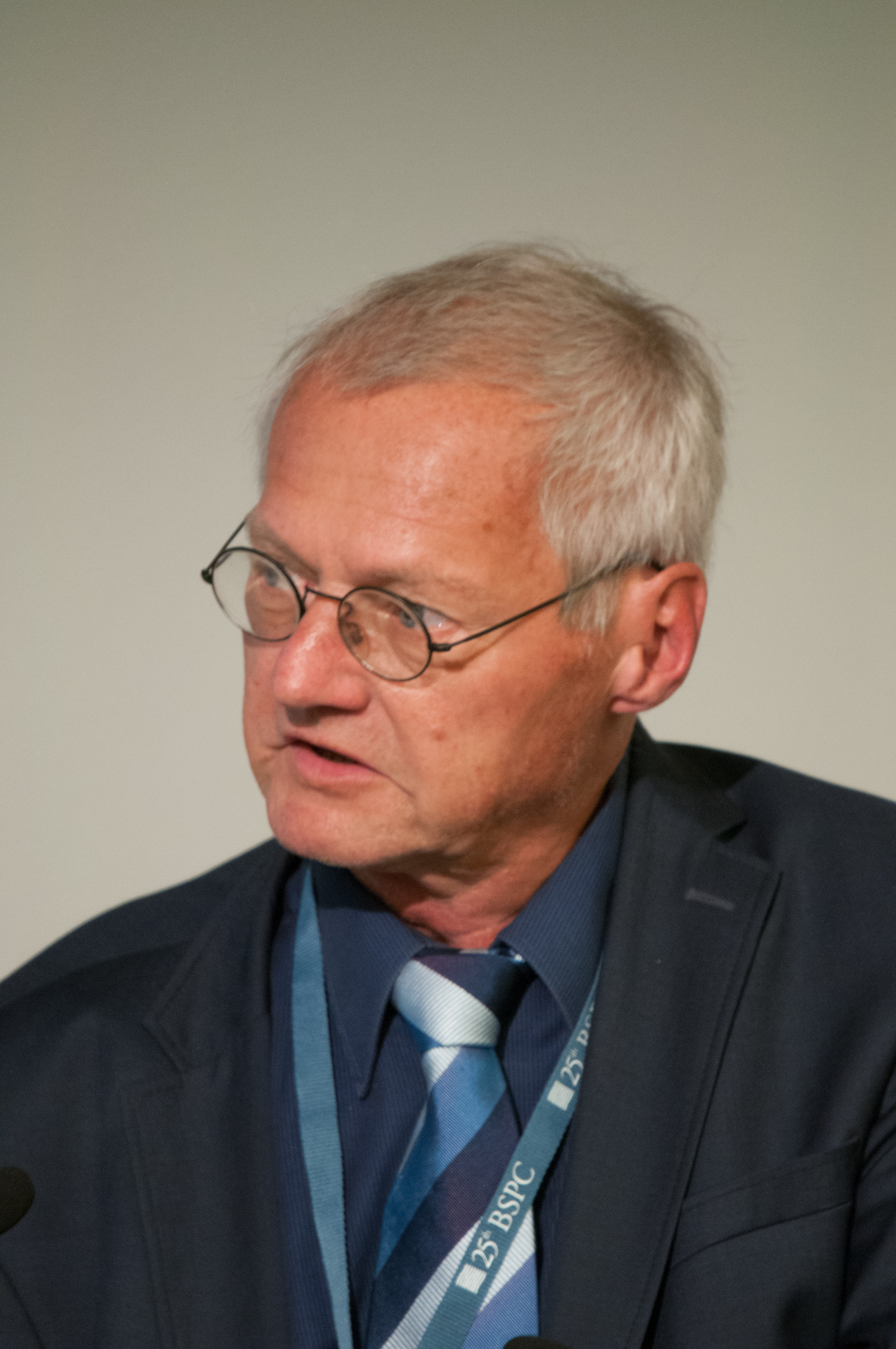
- Brie in August 2016 in Riga

Member of the Landtag of Mecklenburg-Vorpommern
- In office 2011–2016

Member of European Parliament
- In office 1999–2009

Personal details
- Born: March 13, 1950 (age 76) Schwerin, German Democratic Republic
- Party: The Left (2007–); Party of Democratic Socialism (1989–2007); Socialist Unity Party of Germany (1969–1989)
- Spouse: Ingrid Mattern
- Parent: Horst Brie
- Relatives: Michael Brie
- Military Service
- Allegiance: (East Germany) German Democratic Republic
- Branch: National People's Army
- Service years: 1968–1971

André Brie (born 13 March 1950 in Schwerin, Mecklenburg-Vorpommern) is a German politician and from 1999 to 2009 Member of the European Parliament for the Party of Democratic Socialism, part of the European Left and sits on the European Parliament's Committee on Foreign Affairs.

He is also a substitute for the Committee on Petitions and the Committee on the Internal Market and Consumer Protection.

Outside Parliament he is a member of the PDS regional party council in Mecklenburg-Western Pomerania.

== Education ==
- 1968: Skilled tool-maker
- 1976: Degree in political science
- 1979: Dr.rer.pol.
- 1985: Dr.sc.pol.

== Career ==
- 1976-1983: Academic assistant at the Institute for International Relations, Potsdam-Babelsberg (IIB)
- 1983-1986: senior assistant at the IIB
- 1986-1989: lecturer and assistant professor at the IIB
- 1990: Lecturer at the Humboldt University, Berlin
- 1990-1999: Staff Member of the PDS Executive Committee, and PDS election campaign manager
- 1990-1992: Deputy chairman of the PDS
- since 2003: Member of the Mecklenburg-Vorpommern Land executive of the PDS
- since 1999: Member of the European Parliament

== See also ==
- 2004 European Parliament election in Germany
