= Ctiboř (Tachov District) =

- Municipality
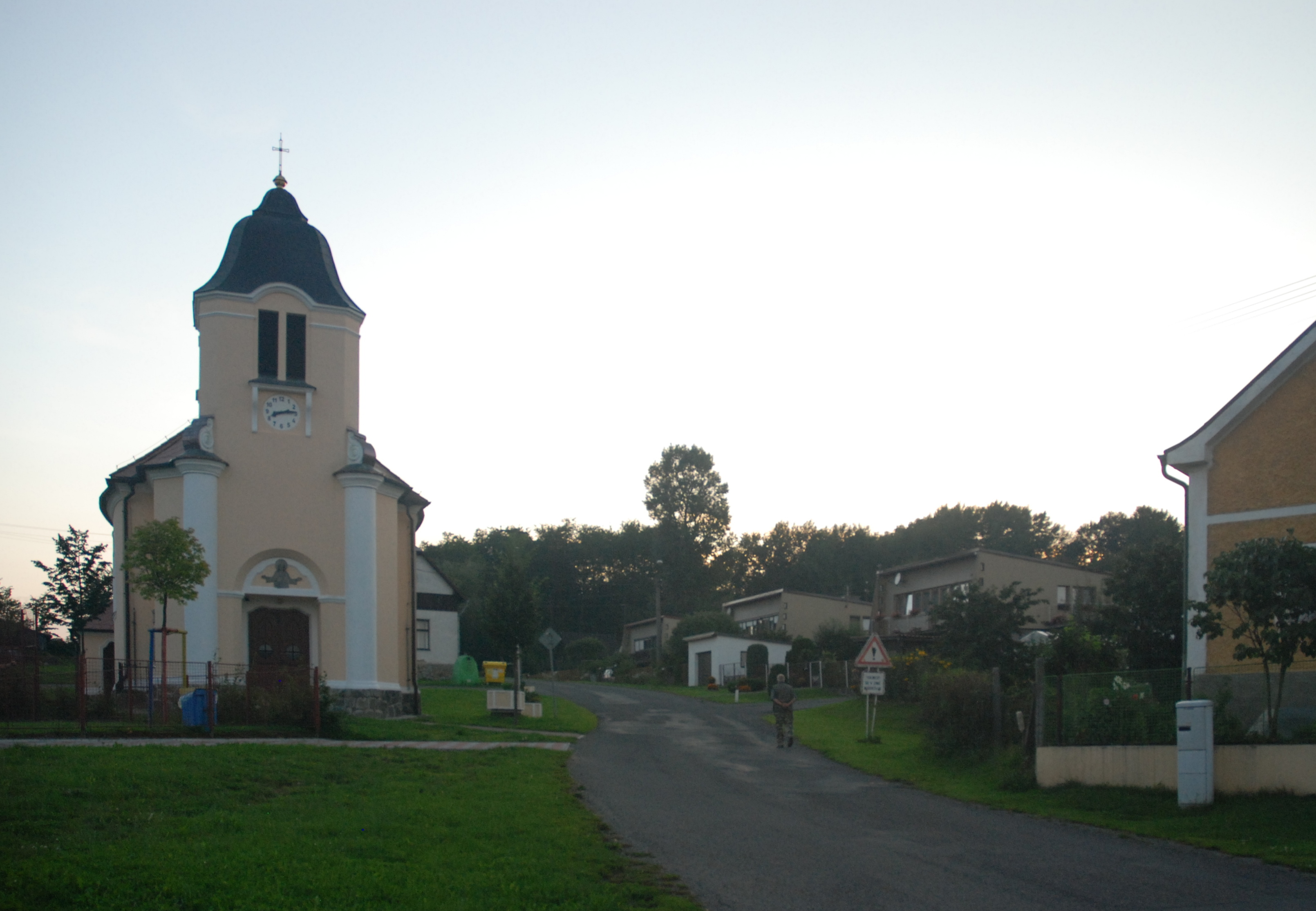
- Chapel of the Sacred Heart of the Lord

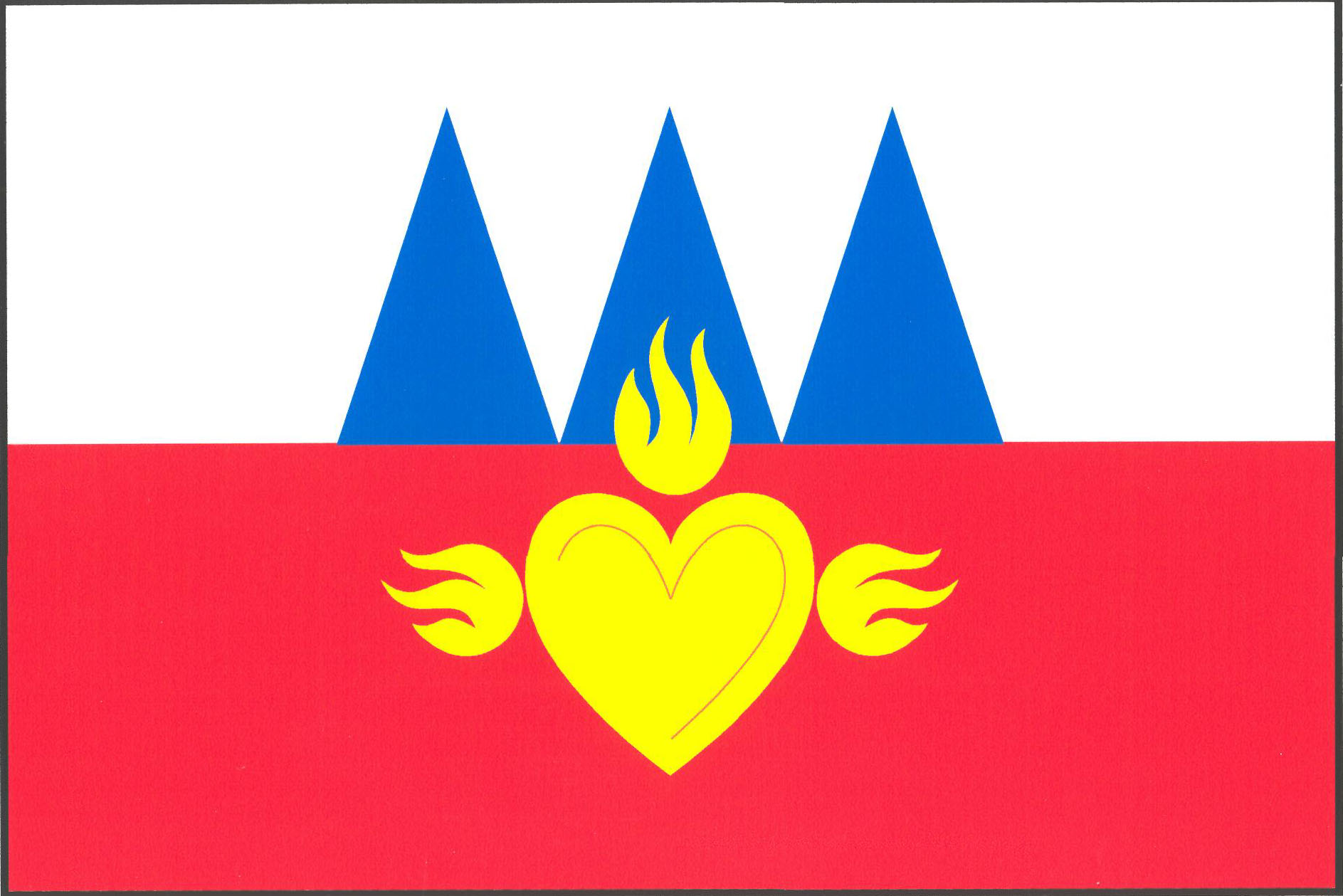
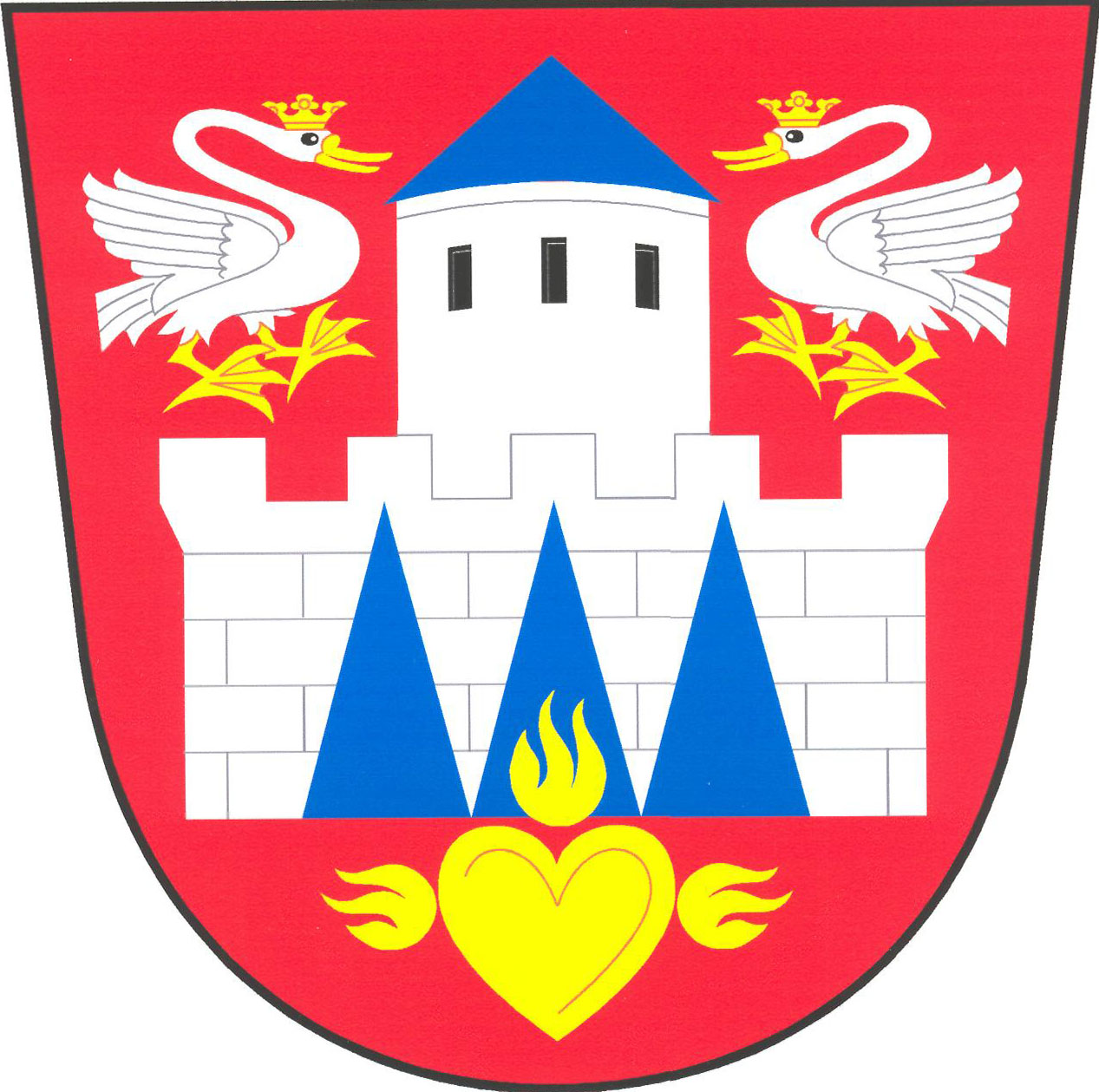
- Flag Coat of arms

- Location in the Czech Republic
- Coordinates: 49°49′38″N 12°36′36″E
- Country: Czech Republic
- Region: Plzeň
- District: Tachov
- First mentioned: 1375

Area
  - Total: 9.42 km^{2} (3.64 sq mi)
- Elevation: 595 m (1,952 ft)

Population (2026-01-01)
  - Total: 322
  - Density: 34.2/km^{2} (88.5/sq mi)
- Time zone: UTC+1 (CET)
  - Summer (DST): UTC+2 (CEST)
- Postal codes: 347 01, 348 15
- Website: www.obecctibor.cz

Ctiboř (German: Stiebenreith) is a municipality and village in Tachov District in the Plzeň Region of the Czech Republic. It has about 300 inhabitants.

== Administrative division ==
Ctiboř consists of two municipal parts (in brackets population according to the 2021 census):

- Ctiboř (285)
- Březí (9)

== Etymology ==
The name is derived from the personal name Ctibor, meaning "Ctibor's".

== Geography ==
Ctiboř is located about 4 kilometres (2 mi) northwest of Tachov and 55 km (34 mi) northwest of Plzeň. It lies on the border between the Upper Palatine Forest mountain range and the Podčeskoleská Hills. The highest point is at 635 m (2,083 ft) above sea level. The municipal territory is rich in small fishponds, fed by several small streams.

== History ==
The first written mention of Ctiboř is from 1375. A fortress stood here in the 15th and 16th centuries, but nothing has survived from it. The village was owned by various lesser noblemen and often changed hands. From 1578 to 1628, Ctiboř was a property of Counts of Trauntenberg. In 1628–1665, it was owned by the Schlick family. From 1665, it belonged to the Planá estate.

== Demographics ==
Historical population

Year	Pop.	±%
1869	507	—
1880	501	−1.2%
1890	511	+2.0%
1900	529	+3.5%
1910	537	+1.5%

Year	Pop.	±%
1921	527	−1.9%
1930	489	−7.2%
1950	314	−35.8%
1961	267	−15.0%
1970	209	−21.7%

Year	Pop.	±%
1980	262	+25.4%
1991	309	+17.9%
2001	326	+5.5%
2011	351	+7.7%
2021	294	−16.2%

Source: Censuses

== Transport ==
There are no railways or major roads passing through the municipality.

== Sights ==
There are no protected cultural monuments in the municipality. The main landmark of Ctiboř is the Chapel of the Sacred Heart of the Lord, built in 1926.
