= Bree (name) =

Bree is a feminine given name and a surname. Van Bree is a surname. Notable people and fictional characters with either of the names include:

== Surname ==
- Bree (surname)

== Given name ==
- Bree Amer (born 1982), Australian television personality
- Bree Fram, American military officer, engineer, and transgender rights activist
- Bree James, Australian politician
- Bree Newsome (born 1985), American filmmaker and activist
- Bree Munro (born 1981), Australian aerial freestyle skier
- Bree Sharp (born 1975), American singer-songwriter
- Bree Turner (born 1977), American actress
- Bree Walker (born 1953), American television news anchor
- Bree Walters (born 1976), Australian actress
- Bree White (born 1981), Australian rules footballer
- Bree Williamson (born 1979), Canadian actress

== Nickname ==
- Bree Cuppoletti (1910–1960), American National Football League player
- Briony Cole (born 1983), Australian retired diver
- Bree Hall (born 2003), American women's basketball player

== Fictional characters ==
- Bree (Narnia), a talking horse from the Narnia novel The Horse and His Boy by C. S. Lewis
- Bree Avery, main character of the web video series lonelygirl15
- Bree Buchanan, on the American soap opera One Life to Live
- Bree Larson Buchanan, one of the main characters in the TV series The Five Mrs. Buchanans
- Bree Daniels, in the 1971 movie Klute, played by Jane Fonda
- Bree Davenport, one of the main characters in the TV series Lab Rats
- Bree Hamilton, on the New Zealand soap opera Shortland Street
- Bree Tanner, a vampire in the Twilight series of novels and films
- Bree Timmins, on the Australian soap opera Neighbours
- Bree Van de Kamp, on the American television series Desperate Housewives
- Bree Young, a minor fictional character in the 2024 Pixar film Inside Out 2
- Bree, from the film Cedar Rapids

== See also ==
- Brie (name)
- Shane O'Bree (born 1979), former Australian rules football player
