= Leudon-en-Brie =

- Commune
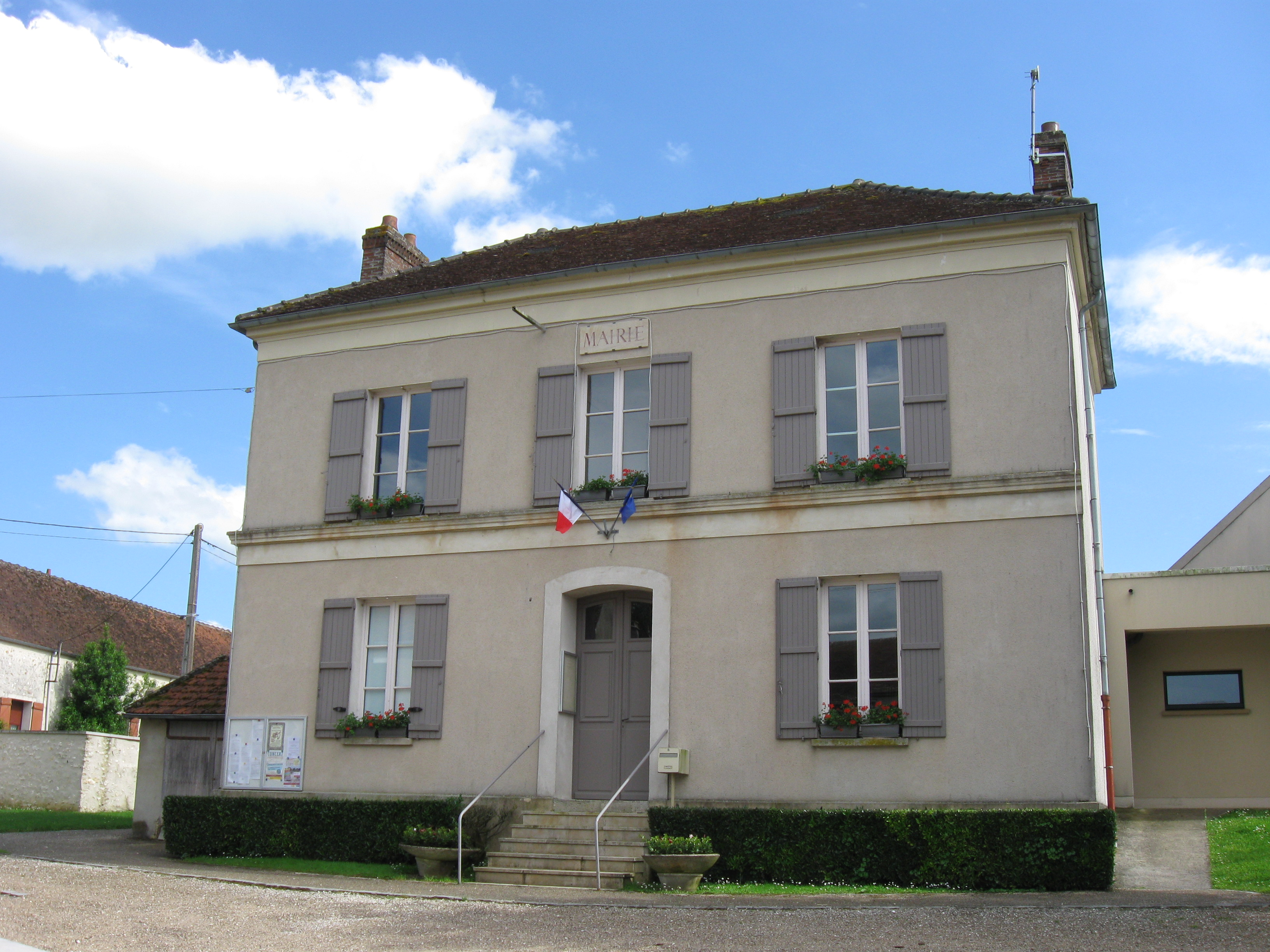
- The town hall in Leudon-en-Brie
- Location of Leudon-en-Brie
- Location within France Location within Île-de-France (region)
- Coordinates: 48°44′03″N 3°16′17″E
- Country: France
- Region: Île-de-France
- Department: Seine-et-Marne
- Arrondissement: Provins
- Canton: Coulommiers
- Intercommunality: CC des Deux Morin

Government
  - Mayor (2020–2026): Claude Lecoq
- Area^{1}: 4.24 km^{2} (1.64 sq mi)
- Highest elevation: 173 m (568 ft)
- Lowest elevation: 155 m (509 ft)
- Population (2023): 168
  - Density: 39.6/km^{2} (103/sq mi)
- Demonym: Leudonais
- Time zone: UTC+01:00 (CET)
  - Summer (DST): UTC+02:00 (CEST)
- INSEE/Postal code: 77250 /77320
- ^{1} French Land Register data, which excludes lakes, ponds, glaciers > 1 km^{2} (0.386 sq mi or 247 acres) and river estuaries.

Leudon-en-Brie (French pronunciation: [lødɔ̃ ɑ̃ bʁi]; lit. 'Leudon-in-Brie') is a rural commune in the Seine-et-Marne department in the Île-de-France region in northern France.

== Demographics ==
Inhabitants are called Leudonnais.

== See also ==
- Communes of the Seine-et-Marne department
