= Nechvalice =

- Municipality
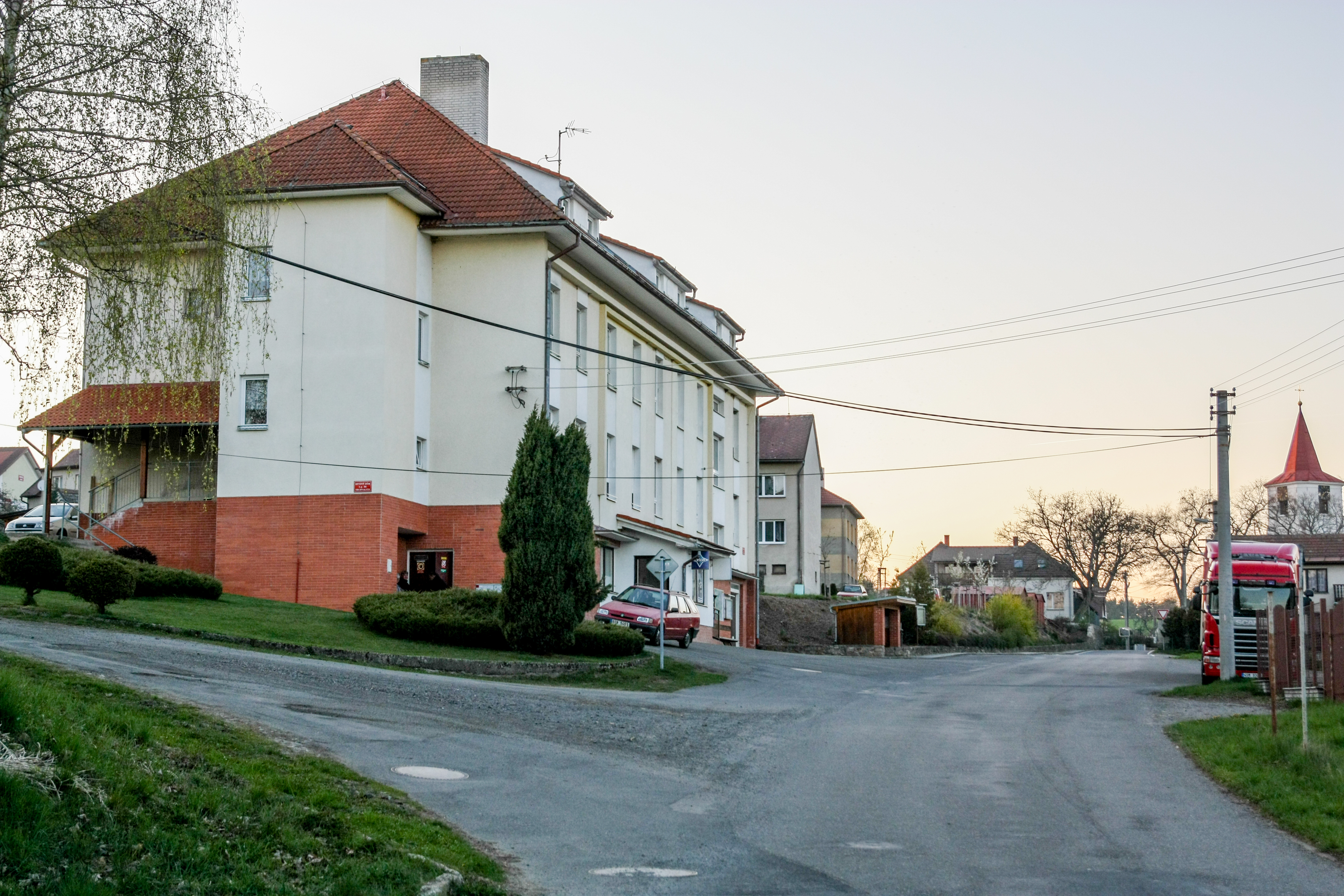
- Main street

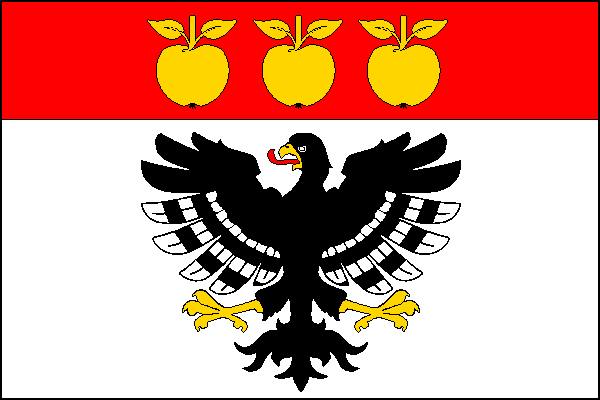
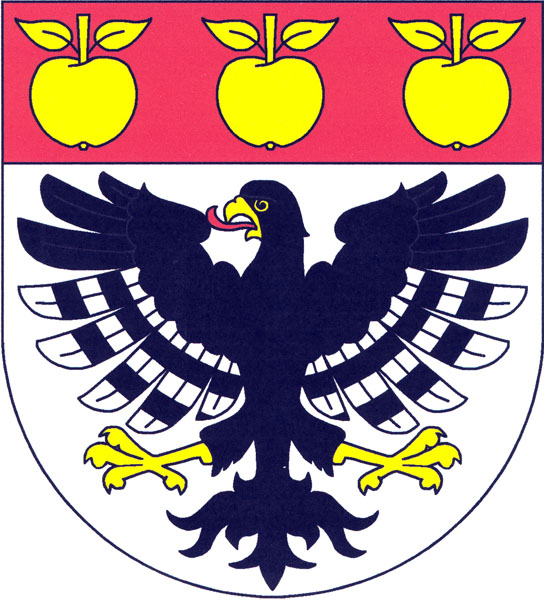
- Flag Coat of arms

- Location in the Czech Republic
- Coordinates: 49°34′36″N 14°23′48″E
- Country: Czech Republic
- Region: Central Bohemian
- District: Příbram
- First mentioned: 1352

Area
  - Total: 24.61 km^{2} (9.50 sq mi)
- Elevation: 485 m (1,591 ft)

Population (2026-01-01)
  - Total: 660
  - Density: 27/km^{2} (69/sq mi)
- Time zone: UTC+1 (CET)
  - Summer (DST): UTC+2 (CEST)
- Postal codes: 257 91, 264 01
- Website: www.obecnechvalice.cz

Nechvalice is a municipality and village in Příbram District in the Central Bohemian Region of the Czech Republic. It has about 700 inhabitants.

== Administrative division ==
Nechvalice consists of 16 municipal parts (in brackets population according to the 2021 census):

- Nechvalice (208)
- Bratřejov (43)
- Bratříkovice (20)
- Březí (30)
- Chválov (31)
- Dražka (29)
- Hodkov (7)
- Huštilář (6)
- Křemenice (54)
- Libčice (32)
- Mokřany (58)
- Rážkovy (11)
- Ředice (53)
- Ředičky (14)
- Setěkovy (10)
- Vratkov (30)

== Etymology ==
The name is derived from the personal name Nechvala, meaning "the village of Nechvala's people".

== Geography ==
Nechvalice is located about 31 kilometres (19 mi) southeast of Příbram and 51 km (32 mi) south of Prague. It lies in mostly in the Vlašim Uplands, only the northernmost part of the municipal territory extends into the Benešov Uplands. The highest point is the hill Skalky at 692 m (2,270 ft) above sea level. The stream Počepický potok flows through the municipality. There are several small fishponds in the municipal territory.

== History ==
The first written mention of Nechvalice is from 1352.

== Demographics ==
Historical population

Year	Pop.	±%
1869	1,866	—
1880	1,780	−4.6%
1890	1,699	−4.6%
1900	1,587	−6.6%
1910	1,496	−5.7%

Year	Pop.	±%
1921	1,475	−1.4%
1930	1,311	−11.1%
1950	1,079	−17.7%
1961	1,028	−4.7%
1970	878	−14.6%

Year	Pop.	±%
1980	696	−20.7%
1991	611	−12.2%
2001	621	+1.6%
2011	620	−0.2%
2021	636	+2.6%

Source: Censuses

== Transport ==
There are no railways or major roads passing through the municipality.

== Sights ==
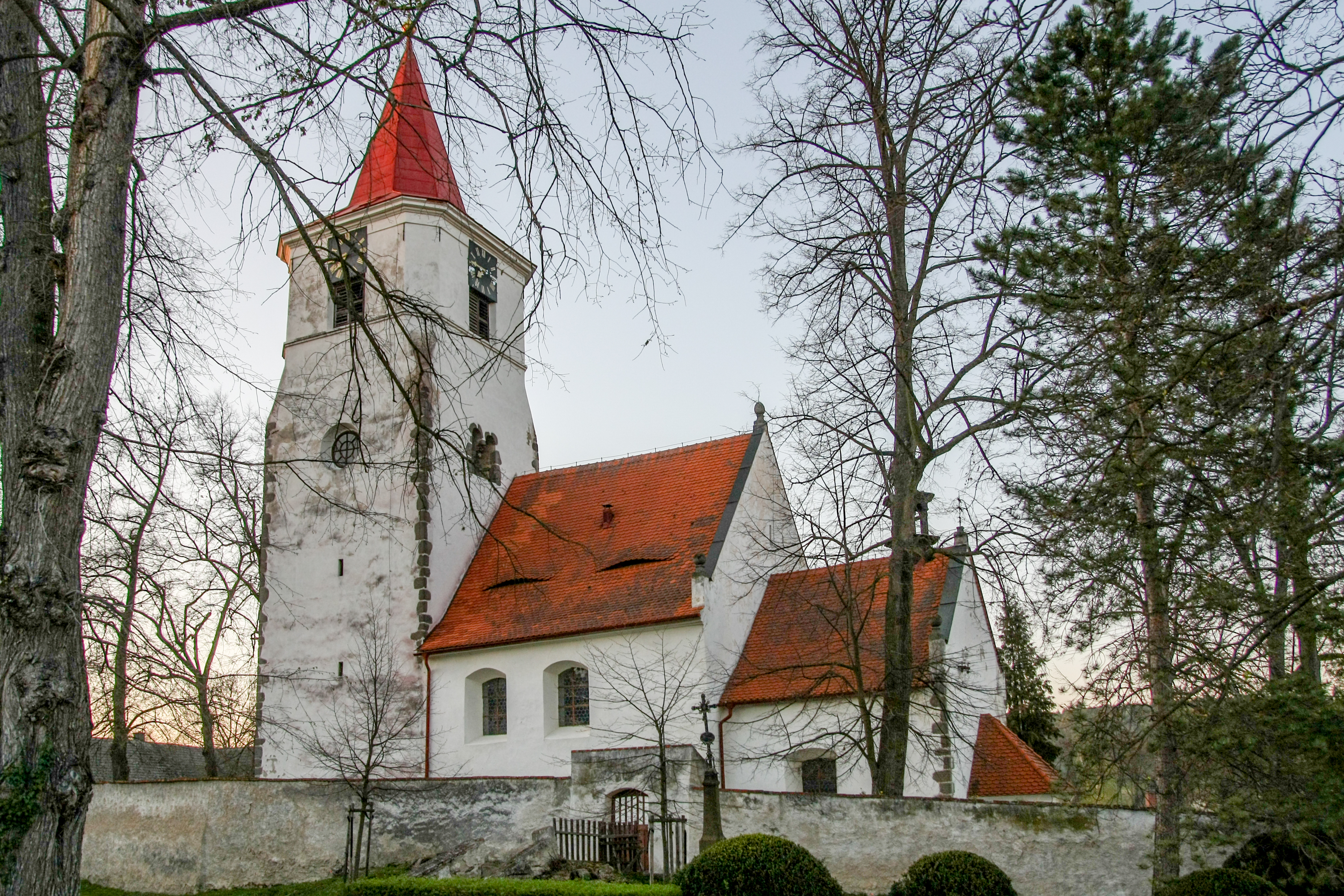
Church of Saint Nicholas

The main landmark of Nechvalice is the Church of Saint Nicholas. It was originally a medieval Romanesque church, which was rebuilt several times (most recently in the Baroque style).

A valuable building is the wooden watermill from the beginning of the 19th century. Today it is used for recreational purposes.
