= Saint-Cyr-sur-Morin =

- Commune
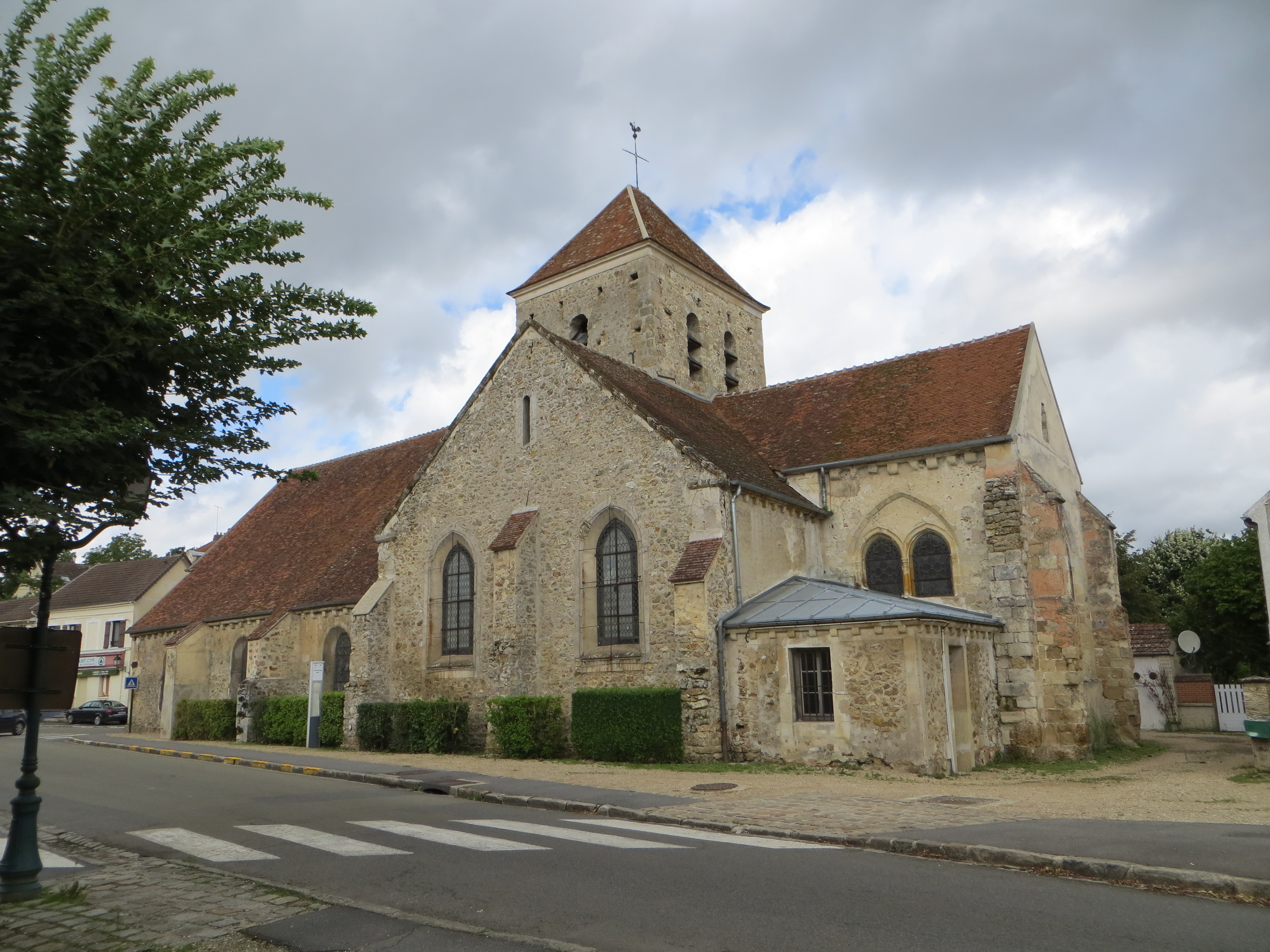
- The church in Saint-Cyr-sur-Morin

- Coat of arms
- Location of Saint-Cyr-sur-Morin
- Location within France Location within Île-de-France (region)
- Coordinates: 48°54′24″N 3°10′57″E
- Country: France
- Region: Île-de-France
- Department: Seine-et-Marne
- Arrondissement: Provins
- Canton: Coulommiers

Government
  - Mayor (2020–2026): Edith Théodose-Poma
- Area^{1}: 19.10 km^{2} (7.37 sq mi)
- Highest elevation: 198 m (650 ft)
- Lowest elevation: 55 m (180 ft)
- Population (2023): 1,976
  - Density: 103.5/km^{2} (267.9/sq mi)
- Time zone: UTC+01:00 (CET)
  - Summer (DST): UTC+02:00 (CEST)
- INSEE/Postal code: 77405 /77750
- ^{1} French Land Register data, which excludes lakes, ponds, glaciers > 1 km^{2} (0.386 sq mi or 247 acres) and river estuaries.

Saint-Cyr-sur-Morin (French pronunciation: [sɛ̃ siʁ syʁ mɔʁɛ̃], literally Saint-Cyr on Morin) is a commune in the Seine-et-Marne department in the Île-de-France region in north-central France. Inhabitants of Saint-Cyr-sur-Morin are called Saint-Cyriens.

== See also ==
- Communes of the Seine-et-Marne department
