= Březí (Prague-East District) =

- Municipality
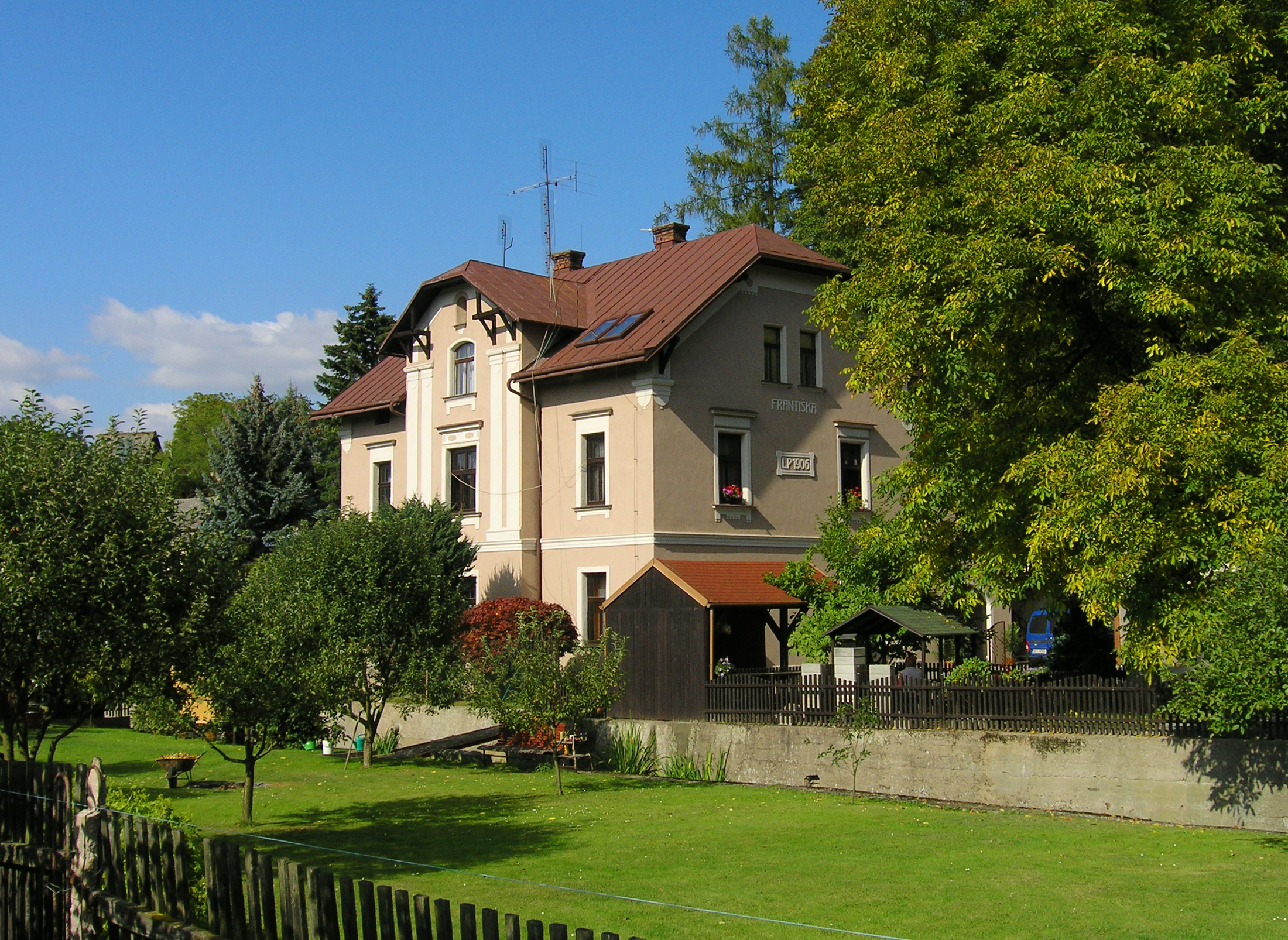
- House in Březí

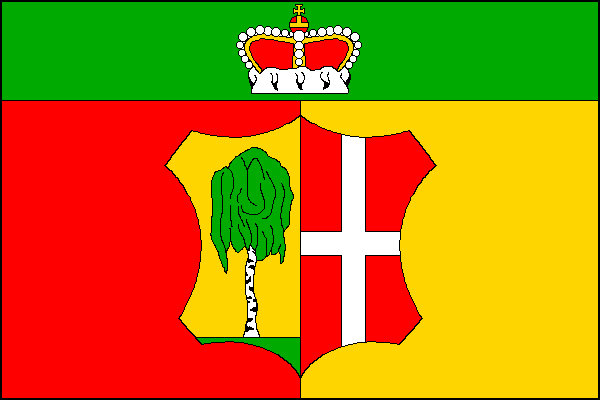
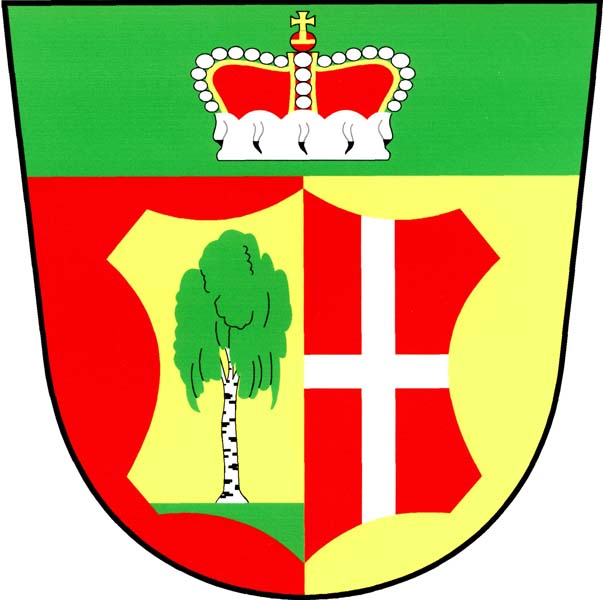
- Flag Coat of arms

- Location in the Czech Republic
- Coordinates: 50°0′53″N 14°41′58″E
- Country: Czech Republic
- Region: Central Bohemian
- District: Prague-East
- First mentioned: 1303

Area
  - Total: 3.08 km^{2} (1.19 sq mi)
- Elevation: 330 m (1,080 ft)

Population (2026-01-01)
  - Total: 667
  - Density: 217/km^{2} (561/sq mi)
- Time zone: UTC+1 (CET)
  - Summer (DST): UTC+2 (CEST)
- Postal code: 251 01
- Website: www.obecbrezi.cz

Březí is a municipality and village in Prague-East District in the Central Bohemian Region of the Czech Republic. It has about 700 inhabitants.

== Demographics ==
Historical population
Year	Pop.	±%
1869	233	—
1880	254	+9.0%
1890	307	+20.9%
1900	304	−1.0%
1910	319	+4.9%
1921	368	+15.4%
1930	362	−1.6%
1950	369	+1.9%
1961	363	−1.6%
1970	261	−28.1%
1980	240	−8.0%
1991	209	−12.9%
2001	254	+21.5%
2011	499	+96.5%
2021	692	+38.7%
Source: Censuses
