= Canton of Rozay-en-Brie =

Coordinates: 48°44′19″N 2°55′46″E

Rozay-en-Brie
- Former canton
- Interactive map of Rozay-en-Brie
- Country: France
- Region: Île-de-France
- Department: Seine-et-Marne
- No. of communes: {{{nbcomm}}}
- Disbanded: 2015
- Area: 307.35 km^{2} (118.67 sq mi)
- Population (2012): 25,985
  - Density: 84.545/km^{2} (218.97/sq mi)

The canton of Rozay-en-Brie is a French former administrative division, located in the arrondissement of Provins, in the Seine-et-Marne département (Île-de-France région). It was disbanded following the French canton reorganisation which came into effect in March 2015.

== Demographics ==
Historical population
Year	Pop.	±%
1999	22,693	—
2006	24,822	+9.4%
2012	25,985	+4.7%

== Composition ==
The canton of Rozay-en-Brie was composed of 22 communes:

- Bernay-Vilbert
- La Chapelle-Iger
- Les Chapelles-Bourbon
- Courpalay
- Crèvecœur-en-Brie
- Dammartin-sur-Tigeaux
- Fontenay-Trésigny
- Hautefeuille
- La Houssaye-en-Brie
- Lumigny-Nesles-Ormeaux
- Marles-en-Brie
- Mortcerf
- Neufmoutiers-en-Brie
- Pézarches
- Le Plessis-Feu-Aussoux
- Rozay-en-Brie
- Tigeaux
- Touquin
- Vaudoy-en-Brie
- Villeneuve-le-Comte
- Villeneuve-Saint-Denis
- Voinsles

== See also ==
- Cantons of the Seine-et-Marne department
- Communes of the Seine-et-Marne department
