= Communauté de communes Les Sources de l'Yerres =

Coordinates: 48.714°N 2.96°E

Les Sources de l'Yerres
- Former communauté de communes
- Country: France
- Region: Île-de-France
- Department: Seine-et-Marne
- No. of communes: {{{nbcomm}}}
- Established: 2003
- Disbanded: 2017
- Area: 163 km^{2} (63 sq mi)
- Population (2013): 9,831
  - Density: 60.3/km^{2} (156/sq mi)

The Communauté de communes Les Sources de l'Yerres is a former federation of municipalities (communauté de communes) in the Seine-et-Marne département and in the Île-de-France région of France. It was created in December 2003. It was merged into the new Communauté de communes du Val Briard in January 2017.

== Composition ==
The Communauté de communes comprised the following communes:

- Bernay-Vilbert
- La Chapelle-Iger
- Courpalay
- Lumigny-Nesles-Ormeaux
- Pécy
- Le Plessis-Feu-Aussoux
- Rozay-en-Brie
- Vaudoy-en-Brie
- Voinsles

== See also ==
- Communes of the Seine-et-Marne department
