= Communauté de communes du Val Bréon =

Coordinates: 48.7536°N 2.8746°E

- Former communauté de communes
- Country: France
- Region: Île-de-France
- Department: Seine-et-Marne
- No. of communes: {{{nbcomm}}}
- Established: 1995
- Disbanded: 2017
- Area: 120.52 km^{2} (46.53 sq mi)
- Population (2012): 15,688
  - Density: 130.17/km^{2} (337.14/sq mi)

The Communauté de communes du Val Bréon is a former federation of municipalities (communauté de communes) in the Seine-et-Marne département and in the Île-de-France région of France. It was created in January 1995. It was merged into the new Communauté de communes du Val Briard in January 2017.

== Composition ==
The Communauté de communes comprised the following communes:

- Les Chapelles-Bourbon
- Châtres
- Crèvecœur-en-Brie
- Fontenay-Trésigny
- La Houssaye-en-Brie
- Liverdy-en-Brie
- Marles-en-Brie
- Mortcerf
- Neufmoutiers-en-Brie
- Presles-en-Brie

== See also ==
- Communes of the Seine-et-Marne department
