= Canton of Tournan-en-Brie =

Coordinates: 48°42′29″N 2°46′28″E

Tournan-en-Brie
- Former canton
- Interactive map of Tournan-en-Brie
- Country: France
- Region: Île-de-France
- Department: Seine-et-Marne
- No. of communes: {{{nbcomm}}}
- Disbanded: 2015
- Area: 137.80 km^{2} (53.20 sq mi)
- Population (2012): 26,830
  - Density: 194.7/km^{2} (504.3/sq mi)

The canton of Tournan-en-Brie is a French former administrative division, located in the arrondissement of Melun, in the Seine-et-Marne département (Île-de-France région). It was disbanded following the French canton reorganisation which came into effect in March 2015.

== Demographics ==
Historical population
Year	Pop.	±%
1999	23,825	—
2006	25,726	+8.0%
2012	26,830	+4.3%

== Composition ==
The canton of Tournan-en-Brie was composed of 9 communes:

- Châtres
- Chaumes-en-Brie
- Courquetaine
- Favières
- Gretz-Armainvilliers
- Liverdy-en-Brie
- Ozouer-le-Voulgis
- Presles-en-Brie
- Tournan-en-Brie

== See also ==
- Cantons of the Seine-et-Marne department
- Communes of the Seine-et-Marne department
