= Communauté de communes de la Brie Boisée =

Coordinates: 48.7973°N 2.7046°E

la Brie Boisée
- Former communauté de communes
- Interactive map of la Brie Boisée
- Country: France
- Region: Île-de-France
- Department: Seine-et-Marne
- No. of communes: {{{nbcomm}}}
- Established: December 1994
- Disbanded: 2017
- Area: 71.29 km^{2} (27.53 sq mi)
- Population (1999): 7,049
  - Density: 98.88/km^{2} (256.1/sq mi)

The Communauté de communes de la Brie Boisée is a former communauté de communes in the Seine-et-Marne département and in the Île-de-France région of France. It was created in December 1994. It was merged into the new Communauté de communes du Val Briard in January 2017.

== Composition ==
The Communauté de communes comprised the following communes:

- Favières
- Ferrières-en-Brie
- Pontcarré
- Villeneuve-le-Comte
- Villeneuve-Saint-Denis

== See also ==
- Communes of the Seine-et-Marne department
