= Breon =

Breon is the name of:

== Given name ==
- Breon Borders (born 1995), American football cornerback
- Breon Corcoran (born 1971), Irish businessman
- Breon Mitchell (born 1942), American scholar, literary translator and bibliographer
- Breon O'Casey (1928–2011), Irish artist
- Breon Peace (born 1971), American lawyer

== Surname ==
- Edmund Breon (1882–1953), Scottish actor
- Jean Nicolas Bréon (1785–1864), French plant collector and botanist

== See also ==
- Communauté de communes du Val Bréon, federation of municipalities in France
