= Neufmoutiers-en-Brie =

- Commune
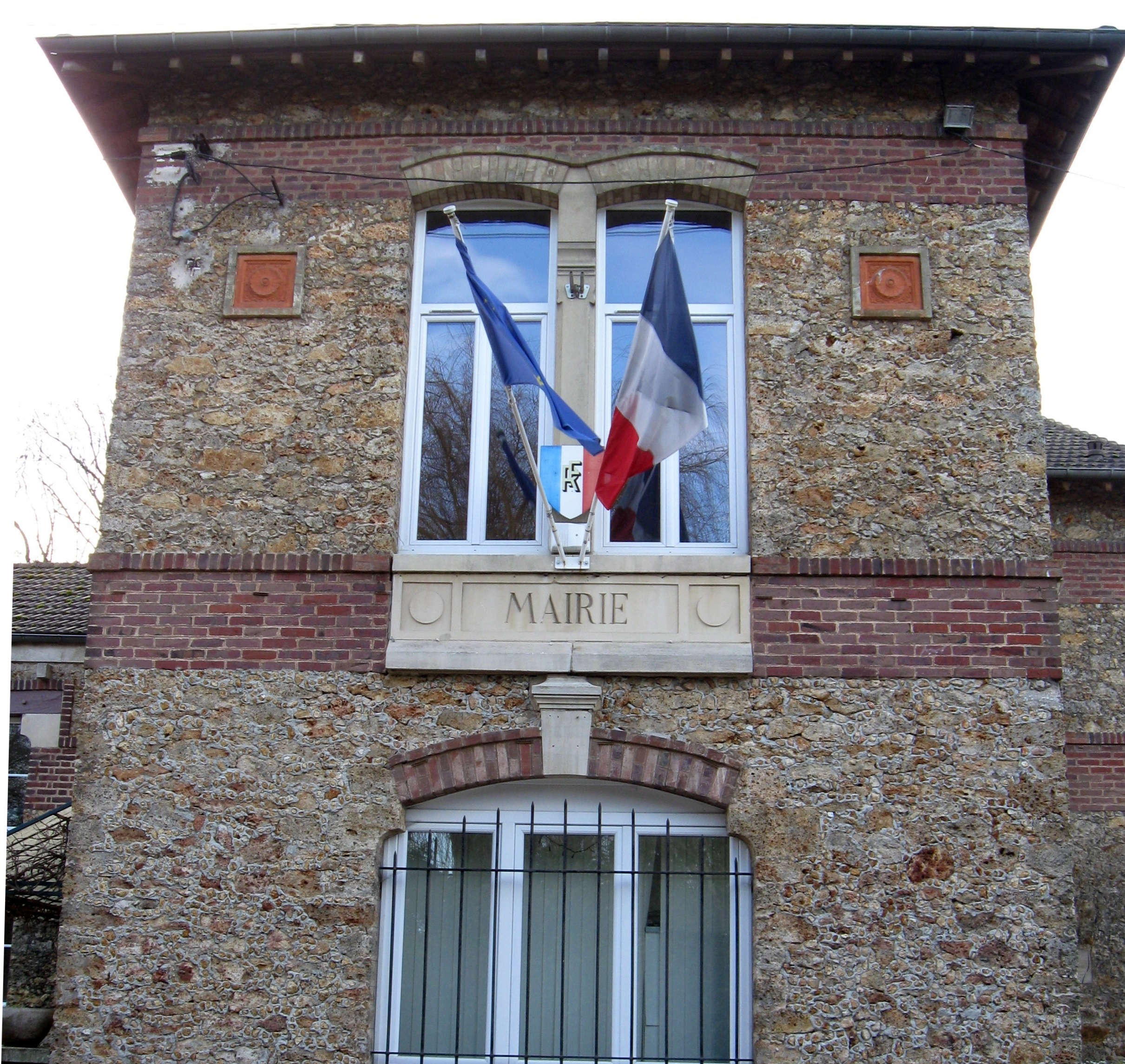
- The town hall in Neufmoutiers-en-Brie

- Coat of arms
- Location of Neufmoutiers-en-Brie
- Location within France Location within Île-de-France (region)
- Coordinates: 48°46′03″N 2°49′52″E
- Country: France
- Region: Île-de-France
- Department: Seine-et-Marne
- Arrondissement: Provins
- Canton: Fontenay-Trésigny
- Intercommunality: CC Val Briard

Government
  - Mayor (2022–2026): Ludovic Pouillot
- Area^{1}: 15.90 km^{2} (6.14 sq mi)
- Highest elevation: 126 m (413 ft)
- Lowest elevation: 111 m (364 ft)
- Population (2023): 1,338
  - Density: 84.15/km^{2} (217.9/sq mi)
- Time zone: UTC+01:00 (CET)
  - Summer (DST): UTC+02:00 (CEST)
- INSEE/Postal code: 77336 /77610
- ^{1} French Land Register data, which excludes lakes, ponds, glaciers > 1 km^{2} (0.386 sq mi or 247 acres) and river estuaries.

Neufmoutiers-en-Brie (French pronunciation: [nœfmutje ɑ̃ bʁi], lit. 'Neufmoutiers in Brie') is a commune in the Seine-et-Marne department in the Île-de-France region in north-central France.

== Landmarks ==
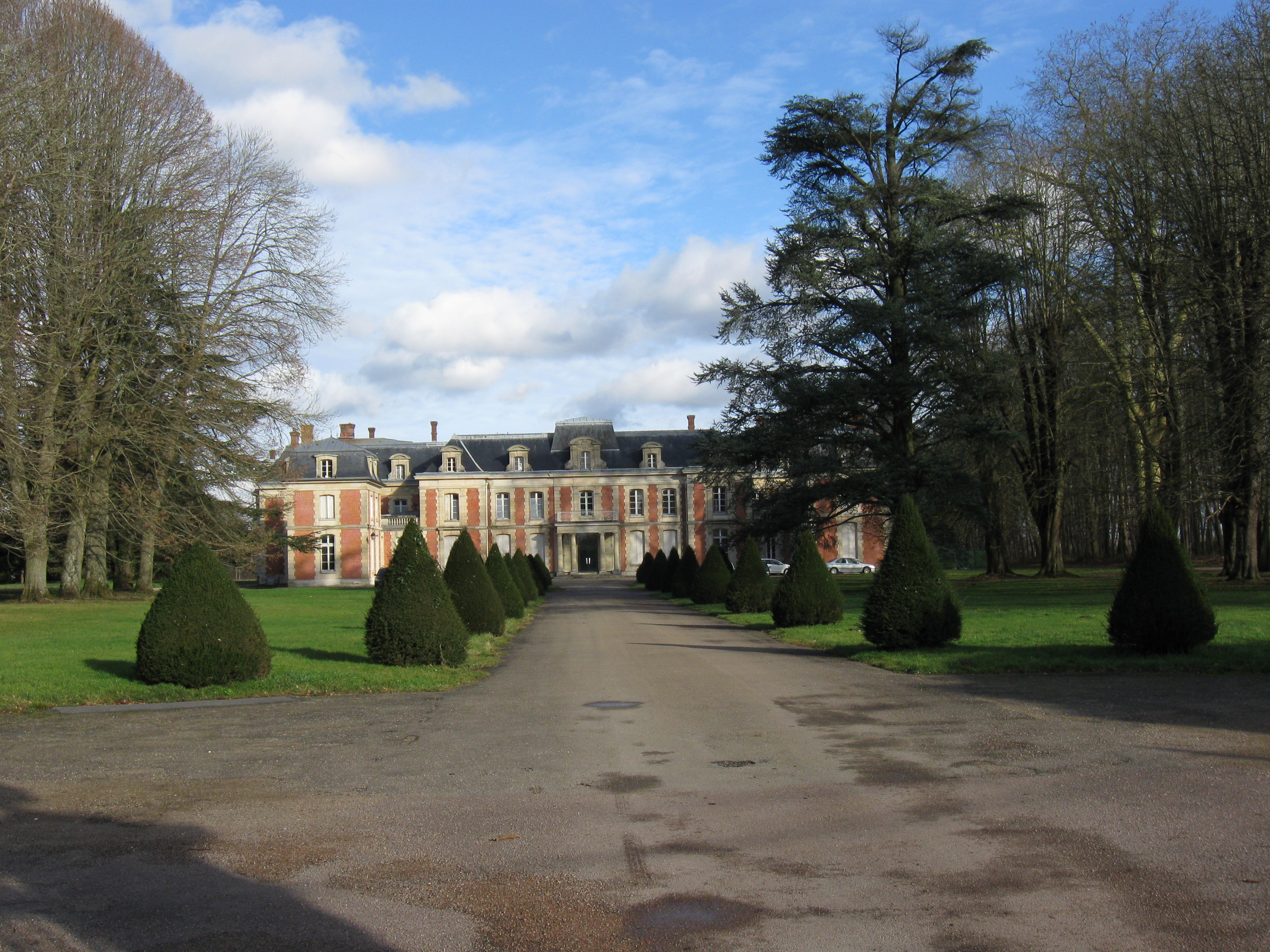
Neufmoutiers-en-Brie château

- The church was built and dedicated in the patronage of Saint-Leu-et-Saint-Gilles in the 13th century, rebuilt in 1749 and restored in 1879.
- The 'Le château du Chemin' castle dated to the 19th century.
- le Centre Médical et Pédagogique pour Adolescents. Built by Countess Stern Singer who donated it around 1950 (after death of her son, who died of tuberculosis). It is a sanatorium located on Castle Road adjacent to the Castle and to the Veterans Foundation. The architect Louis Sainsaulieu built it in 1955, next to the castle. This Medical and Educational Center for Teens is the largest business in the town.
- The town is crossed by the hiking trail 14 (GR 14).
- The town has a library (open Wednesday and Saturday) as well as a hall (capacity 100 places).

== Demographics ==
Inhabitants are called Neufmonastériens in French.

=== Population ===
Historical population
Year	Pop.	±% p.a.
1968	555	—
1975	584	+0.73%
1982	771	+4.05%
1990	745	−0.43%
1999	854	+1.53%
2007	992	+1.89%
2012	946	−0.95%
2017	1,091	+2.89%
2023	1,338	+3.46%
Source: INSEE

=== Urban development ===
The village remained historically small, limited to the nineteenth century to the church and fifteen houses set along the street from the Obelisk. The municipality had several minor hamlets: the Bourbelle, the Three Houses, Little Fortelle the Boutilliers, Wood Breton. Large farms maillaient territory: the Égrefins (fortified, pigeon), the Great Pigeonnières, the White terminal (fortified, disappeared). Construction of the new sanatorium-school Secondary School Students by architect Louis Sainsaulieu in 1955 next to the Castle Path (which was transformed into a sanatorium for veterans organization) was an important step in the life of the common. The development of the village was slow: at the beginning of the current General de Gaulle street before 1950 along Church Street around 1960. The development then slows in the 1970s, with some facility flags in the street of General de Gaulle. The 1980s knew no real development. The urbanization of the village took place in the early 1990s, in a context of population growth in part linked to the development of Val d'Europe and the installation of Disneyland Paris . The first subdivision located between the street from the Obelisk and the rue de Bellevue (rue des Bouleaux and street Saulnes) was implemented in 1992 and completed in 1994, establishing a continuity between the village and the farm Bellevue. The second subdivision located between General de Gaulle and rue the Obelisk (street Warblers rue des Mésanges) was implemented in 1994 and completed in 1997. The third subdivision of Reeds Street was built in parallel. The last subdivision street Harvest and street Spica was built in 2003. Urbanization is also made around the hamlet of Three Houses, with the establishment of lodges, although not to the village on the other side of the Marsange. The new population is mainly from urban or sub-urban areas in search of a better life. The concern for rigorous land management by enabling a smooth evolution of the village while preserving its rural character.

=== Politics ===
Since 1945, there have been seven mayors of Neufmoutiers-en-Brie:

- 29 April 1945 - October 19, 1947: Camille Laurent
- 19 October 1947 - March 14, 1965: Leon Sendron
- March 14, 1965 - March 14, 1971: Pierre Montenat
- March 14, 1971 - March 17, 1989: Laurent Sendron
- March 17, 1989 - April 14, 2015: Jean-Jacques Barbaux
- April 14, 2015 - 2020: Bernard Carmona
- 2020 - incumbent: Ludovic Pouillot

=== Judicial and administrative bodies ===
The town falls within the district court of Meaux, the High Court of Meaux, the Assize Court of Melun, the Court of Appeal of Paris, the Juvenile Court of Meaux, the labor court Meaux, the commercial court of Meaux, the administrative court of Melun and the administrative court of appeal of Paris.

=== Notable Persons ===
- The composer Émile Goué died in the sanatorium of Neufmoutiers in 1946.
- The filmmaker Gérard Courant spent a year and a half (January 4, 1966 to July 31, 1967) at the sanatorium Lycéens.

== Heraldry ==
Coat of arms.

The coat of arms shield was adopted one month after its presentation to the City Council, on 8 November 1989. It is the first shield that Jean-Claude Molinier realized in Seine-et-Marne, where it arrived on 27 September 1989.

Gules Saint Leu bishop gold holding at his feet a wolf lying in the sand and the sinister a wounded doe lying silver with a golden arrow bleeding reds. All on a terrace Vert herbée. The Head of sand bearing the letters money capital "N" and "B". The pal of azure golden lilies nodding over all. outdoor ornaments The shield is surmounted by the mural crown of gold, accosted dexter rushes natural and sinister ears of golden wheat, everything set necklace and bound by a golden horseshoe and issuant sprays of water azure. The crown surmounted by three gold houses toiturées sand placed on a Mount Vert.

Red is always the reference of the Brie. Saint Leu is the first patron saint of the town. The doe Saint Gilles is the hunter who wounded a doe; the latter having spoken to him and had said that he had done a bad action, the hunter converted to Christianity and became an ardent defender of nature. The lilies recall that Neufmoutiers-en-Brie is Île-de-France. The letters are the initials of the name of the village and colors recall that of the birch tree species common in the Neufmonastériens wood. The towers crown is the heraldic symbol chosen for cities and villages. Ears of wheat honor agriculture and reeds or cattails recall the name of Masselins, the village hamlet. The horseshoe Étisses honors the farm where it is an equestrian center and water jets Laurier source, mineral water known.

== Services ==
=== Education ===
The town of Neufmoutiers-en-Brie is located in the Academy of Créteil. The children of the town school attend kindergarten and elementary with cafeteria, study hall, activity center and nursery school-integrated perished

The town is linked to the College Jean-Baptiste Vermay of Tournan-en-Brie, namesake of artist Jean Baptiste Vermay, which was completely renovated and extended over 2 500m² in 2014, is one of the largest colleges of Seine-et-Marne, and the high school multipurpose Clément Ader of Tournan-en-Brie.

=== Media ===
The regional daily newspaper is Le Parisien in its local Seine-et-Marne edition and the bi-weekly Le Pays Briard. The town is also in the transmission basin TV channels France 3 Paris Ile-de-France and Centre IDF1.

=== Sport ===
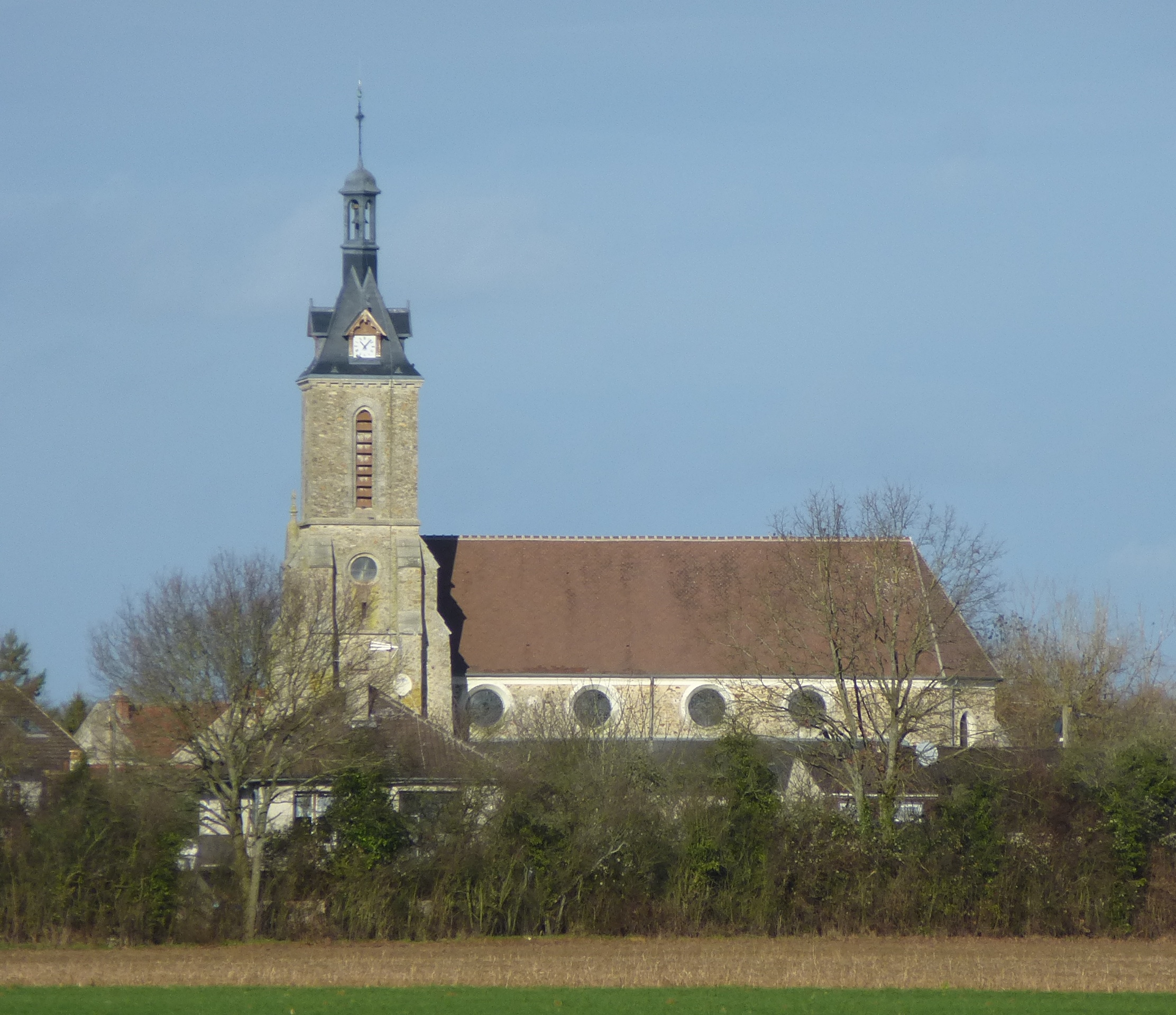
St Leu and St Giles Church

The town has two sports associations. The surrounding communities also have many sports associations for multiple sports. The town is in the municipal grouping pool of Fontenay-Trésigny. The town has the municipal stadium, a small area for basketball and a tennis court.

=== Religion ===
The town of Neufmoutiers-en-Brie is part of the parish Catholic "missionary pole of Val d'Europe" in the diocese of Meaux. It has the church Saint-Leu-and-Saint-Gilles and the monastery of Our Lady of the Visitation of Fortelle .

== Geography ==
=== Geology ===
The upper structural platform of the Brie is formed by a layer of stone millstones dating from the Sannoisian. The exploitation of these stone millstone provided a building material widely used in the municipality. The layer of millstone is overcome by a more or less regular coat of silt trays which are made up of sandy clay deposits thin and compact an important fertility.

Former marl pits were operating on the territory. The extraction of the millstone was related to the need of building materials for houses and walls on the one hand, and for the construction of roads development in the eighteenth century and nineteenth century on the other.

The territory of the town of Neufmoutiers-en-Brie was included in 1984 in an area of operations and research oil called "Permis de La Marsange ". The permit was renewed in 1990 and then extended in 1995. It was resumed in 1997 with the concession of liquid or gaseous hydrocarbons mines called "Champrose Concession". In 2010, an exclusive license was granted to the company Poros SAS, covering 459 km 2 and valid until October 21, 2015.

=== Relief ===
The area of the town is 1,590 hectares; its altitude varies between 111 meters to the southwest at the ru of Boissières and 126 meters on the road bridge crossing of Favières the TGV.

The town lies on a plateau at very low relief, crossed by the upper part of the Marsange and various rus. His landscapes are typical of the Brie, marked by a succession of open fields (culture of wheat, the corn and sugar beet ). The territory consists of a large central area cleared won the primeval forest of Brie surrounded by dense forests north Crécy forest, west (wood Mandegris) and south (wood Ménillet), and open to southeast to La Houssaye-en-Brie and Chapels Bourbon. Difficult soil to drain explain the late and partial clearing of land, located over the edge of the royal estate and Champagne County before the forest becomes a game reserve.

=== Hydrography ===
The territory is located almost entirely in the Marsange watershed. The Marsange, runs between the municipal area north from Villeneuve-le-Comte and a spring in the west towards Favières, that passes between the village and the hamlet of "des Trois Maisons". The tributaries are the Grand ru ru pond and of Boissières. The flatness and the terrain explain the presence of numerous brooks more or less intermittent.

The town is in the catchment basins of the Bréon on the border of La Houssaye-en-Brie. The territory is dotted with small lakes, mostly former marl.

=== Climate ===
The town has a temperate oceanic climate. Average annual rainfall is around 700 mm and is spread over the entire year. Rainfall in the eastern French Brie is slightly higher than the county average (650 mm), and slightly higher than the rest of the Île-de-France region (600 mm). The average temperature ranges from + 3 ° to + 18 °. Snow is exceptional.

== See also ==
- Communes of the Seine-et-Marne department
