= Communauté de communes du Val Briard =

Federation of municipalities in France

Val Briard
- Communauté de communes
- Interactive map of Val Briard
- Coordinates: 48°46′N 02°52′E
- Country: France
- Region: Île-de-France
- Department: Seine-et-Marne
- No. of communes: {{{nbcomm}}}
- Established: 2017
- Area: 333.0 km^{2} (128.6 sq mi)
- Population (2019): 28,266
  - Density: 84.88/km^{2} (219.8/sq mi)

The Communauté de communes du Val Briard is a communauté de communes in the Seine-et-Marne département and in the Île-de-France région of France. It was formed on 1 January 2017 by the merger of the former Communauté de communes de la Brie Boisée, Communauté de communes du Val Bréon, Communauté de communes Les Sources de l'Yerres and the commune Courtomer. In July 2017, the communes Ferrières-en-Brie and Pontcarré left the communauté de communes du Val Briard and joined the Communauté d'agglomération de Marne et Gondoire. Its seat is in Les Chapelles-Bourbon. Its area is 333.0 km^{2}, and its population was 28,266 in 2019.

== Composition ==
It consists of 21 communes:

1. Bernay-Vilbert
2. La Chapelle-Iger
3. Les Chapelles-Bourbon
4. Châtres
5. Courpalay
6. Courtomer
7. Crèvecœur-en-Brie
8. Favières
9. Fontenay-Trésigny
10. La Houssaye-en-Brie
11. Liverdy-en-Brie
12. Lumigny-Nesles-Ormeaux
13. Marles-en-Brie
14. Mortcerf
15. Neufmoutiers-en-Brie
16. Pécy
17. Le Plessis-Feu-Aussoux
18. Presles-en-Brie
19. Rozay-en-Brie
20. Vaudoy-en-Brie
21. Voinsles
