= Chaumes-en-Brie =

- Commune
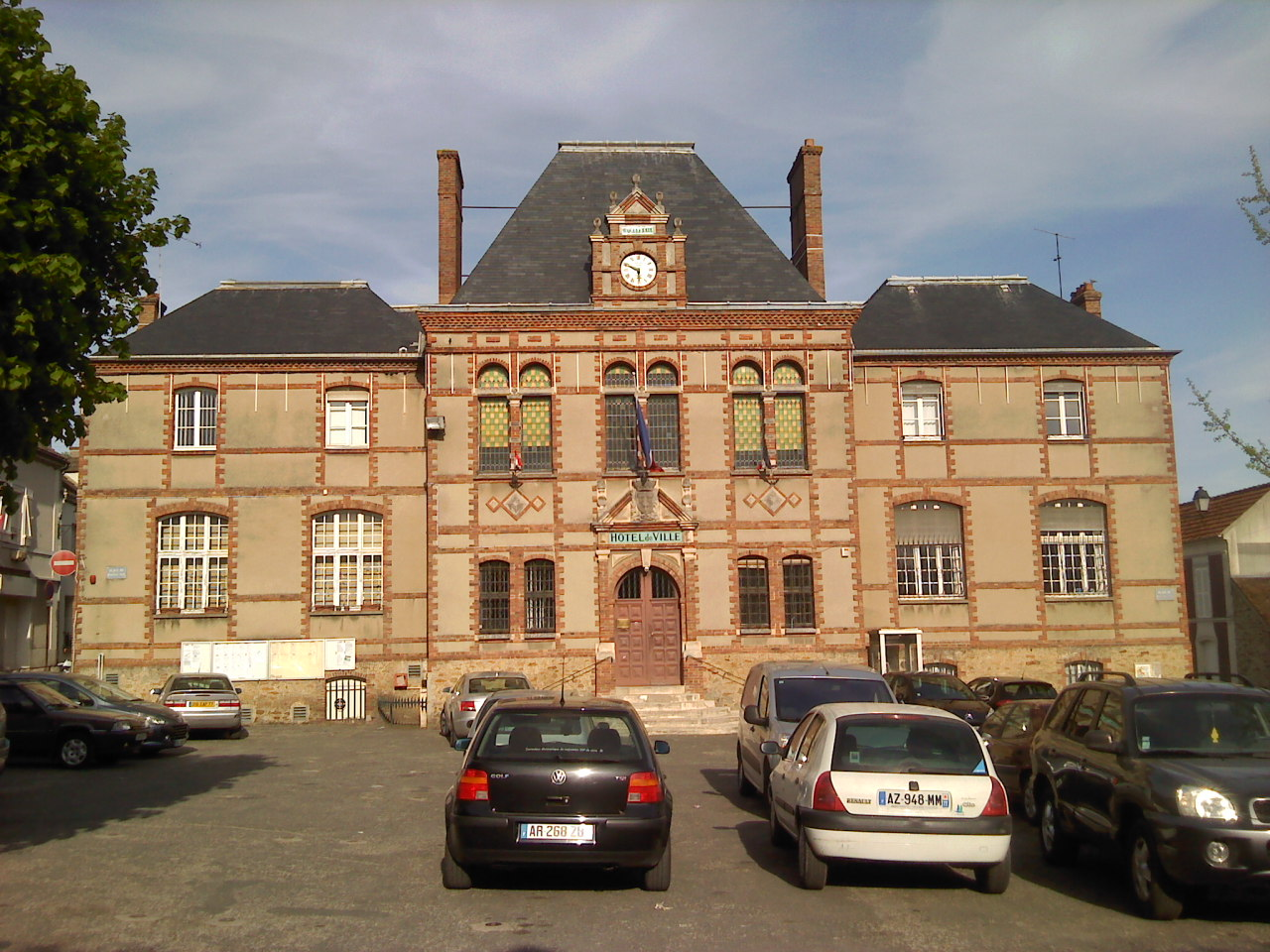
- The town hall in Chaumes-en-Brie

- Coat of arms
- Location of Chaumes-en-Brie
- Location within France Location within Île-de-France (region)
- Coordinates: 48°40′07″N 2°50′38″E
- Country: France
- Region: Île-de-France
- Department: Seine-et-Marne
- Arrondissement: Melun
- Canton: Fontenay-Trésigny
- Intercommunality: CC Brie des Rivières et Châteaux

Government
  - Mayor (2020–2026): François Venanzuola
- Area^{1}: 20.07 km^{2} (7.75 sq mi)
- Highest elevation: 116 m (381 ft)
- Lowest elevation: 67 m (220 ft)
- Population (2023): 3,503
  - Density: 174.5/km^{2} (452.1/sq mi)
- Time zone: UTC+01:00 (CET)
  - Summer (DST): UTC+02:00 (CEST)
- INSEE/Postal code: 77107 /77390
- ^{1} French Land Register data, which excludes lakes, ponds, glaciers > 1 km^{2} (0.386 sq mi or 247 acres) and river estuaries.

Chaumes-en-Brie (French pronunciation: [ʃom ɑ̃ bʁi], lit. 'Chaumes-in-Brie') is a commune in the Seine-et-Marne department in the Île-de-France region in north-central France. It is best known as the ancient home of the Couperin family of composers and musicians.

== Population ==
Historical population
Year	Pop.	±% p.a.
1968	1,792	—
1975	1,823	+0.25%
1982	2,139	+2.31%
1990	2,500	+1.97%
1999	2,743	+1.04%
2007	2,982	+1.05%
2012	3,011	+0.19%
2017	3,242	+1.49%
2023	3,503	+1.30%
Source: INSEE

The inhabitants are called Calmétiens in French.

== See also ==
- Communes of the Seine-et-Marne department
