= Courtomer =

Courtomer is the name of two communes in France:

- Courtomer, Orne, in the Orne department
- Courtomer, Seine-et-Marne, in the Seine-et-Marne department
