= Canton of Fontenay-Trésigny =

Canton in Île-de-France, France

Coordinates: 48.70°N 2.87°E

The canton of Fontenay-Trésigny is an administrative division of the Seine-et-Marne department, in northern France. It was created at the French canton reorganisation which came into effect in March 2015. Its seat is in Fontenay-Trésigny.

It consists of the following communes:

1. Bernay-Vilbert
2. La Chapelle-Iger
3. Les Chapelles-Bourbon
4. Châtres
5. Chaumes-en-Brie
6. Coubert
7. Courpalay
8. Courquetaine
9. Crèvecœur-en-Brie
10. Dammartin-sur-Tigeaux
11. Évry-Grégy-sur-Yerre
12. Faremoutiers
13. Fontenay-Trésigny
14. Grisy-Suisnes
15. Guérard
16. La Houssaye-en-Brie
17. Limoges-Fourches
18. Lissy
19. Liverdy-en-Brie
20. Lumigny-Nesles-Ormeaux
21. Marles-en-Brie
22. Mortcerf
23. Neufmoutiers-en-Brie
24. Ozouer-le-Voulgis
25. Pécy
26. Le Plessis-Feu-Aussoux
27. Pommeuse
28. Presles-en-Brie
29. Rozay-en-Brie
30. Soignolles-en-Brie
31. Solers
32. Vaudoy-en-Brie
33. Voinsles
