= Dammartin-sur-Tigeaux =

- Commune
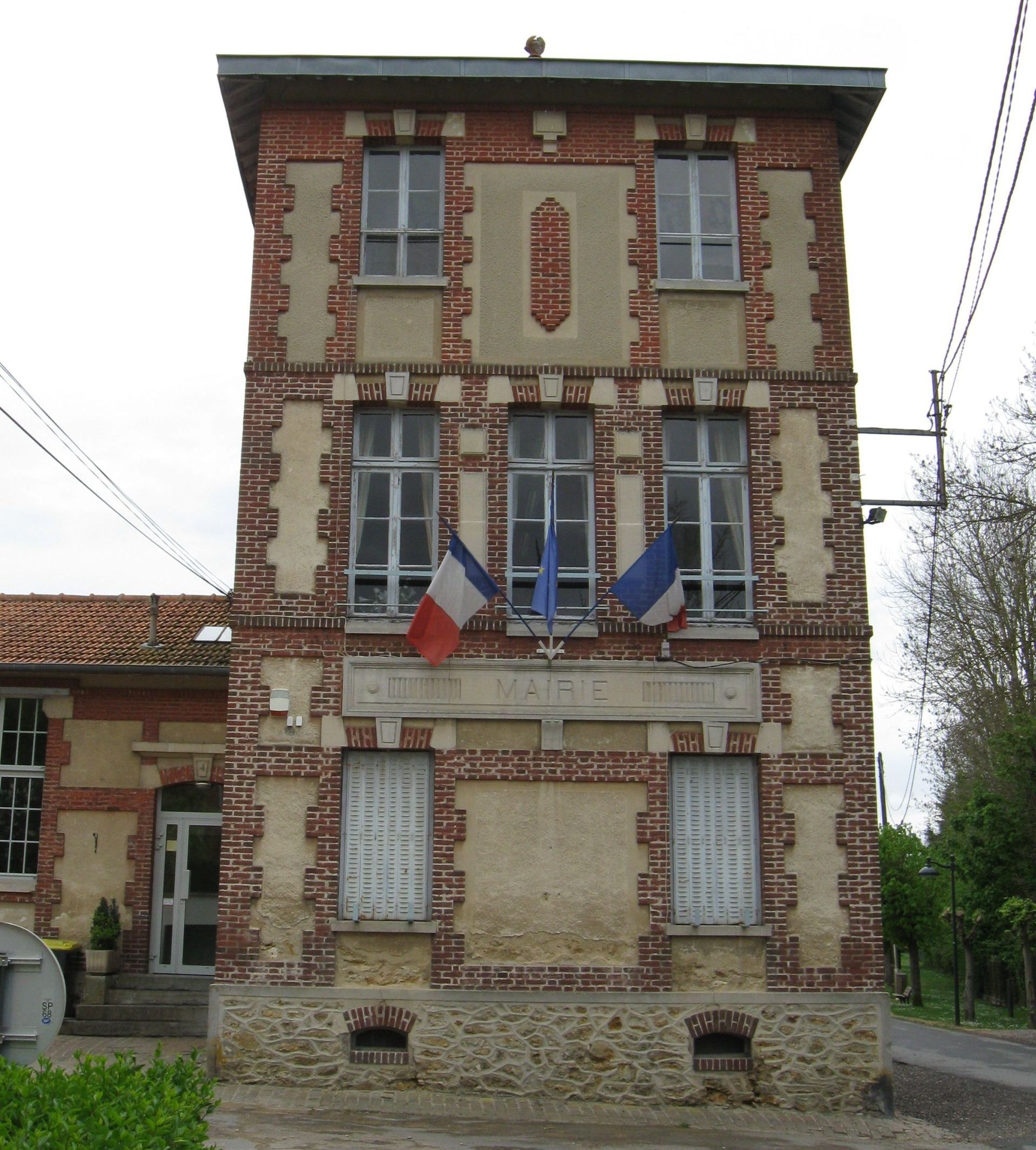
- The town hall in Dammartin-sur-Tigeaux

- Coat of arms
- Location of Dammartin-sur-Tigeaux
- Location within France Location within Île-de-France (region)
- Coordinates: 48°49′12″N 2°55′14″E
- Country: France
- Region: Île-de-France
- Department: Seine-et-Marne
- Arrondissement: Meaux
- Canton: Fontenay-Trésigny
- Intercommunality: CA Coulommiers Pays de Brie

Government
  - Mayor (2020–2026): Angélique Mercier
- Area^{1}: 9.04 km^{2} (3.49 sq mi)
- Highest elevation: 133 m (436 ft)
- Lowest elevation: 50 m (160 ft)
- Population (2023): 1,280
  - Density: 142/km^{2} (367/sq mi)
- Time zone: UTC+01:00 (CET)
  - Summer (DST): UTC+02:00 (CEST)
- INSEE/Postal code: 77154 /77163
- ^{1} French Land Register data, which excludes lakes, ponds, glaciers > 1 km^{2} (0.386 sq mi or 247 acres) and river estuaries.

Dammartin-sur-Tigeaux (French pronunciation: [damaʁtɛ̃ syʁ tiʒo], literally Dammartin on Tigeaux) is a commune in the Seine-et-Marne department' in the Île-de-France region in north-central France.

== Demographics ==
Inhabitants of Dammartin-sur-Tigeaux are called Dammartinois.

== See also ==
- Communes of the Seine-et-Marne department
