= Liverdy-en-Brie =

- Commune
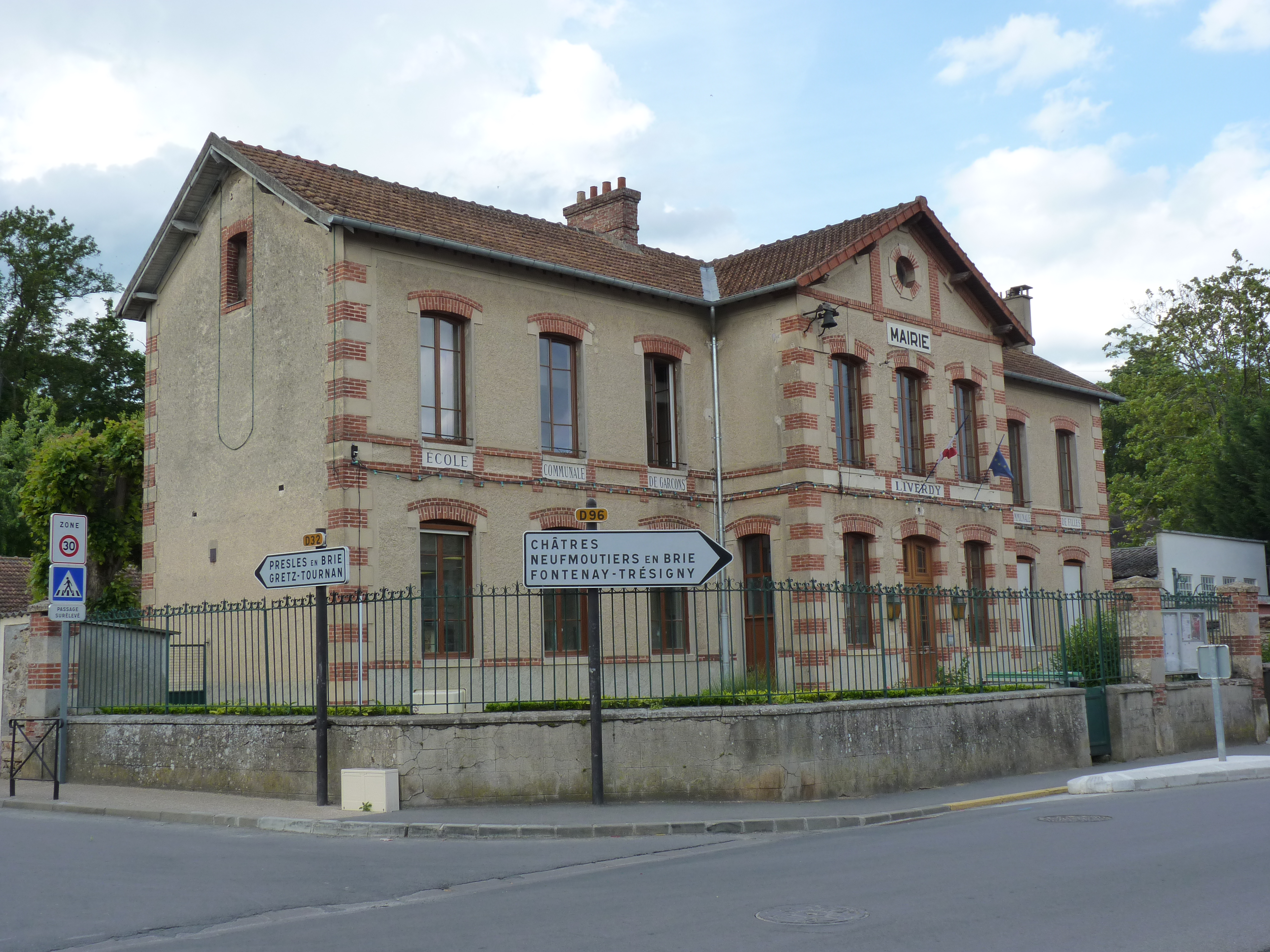
- The town hall in Liverdy-en-Brie

- Coat of arms
- Location of Liverdy-en-Brie
- Location within France Location within Île-de-France (region)
- Coordinates: 48°42′01″N 2°46′34″E
- Country: France
- Region: Île-de-France
- Department: Seine-et-Marne
- Arrondissement: Provins
- Canton: Fontenay-Trésigny
- Intercommunality: CC Val Briard

Government
  - Mayor (2020–2026): Hugues Marcelot
- Area^{1}: 9.12 km^{2} (3.52 sq mi)
- Highest elevation: 109 m (358 ft)
- Lowest elevation: 73 m (240 ft)
- Population (2023): 1,410
  - Density: 155/km^{2} (400/sq mi)
- Time zone: UTC+01:00 (CET)
  - Summer (DST): UTC+02:00 (CEST)
- INSEE/Postal code: 77254 /77220
- ^{1} French Land Register data, which excludes lakes, ponds, glaciers > 1 km^{2} (0.386 sq mi or 247 acres) and river estuaries.

Liverdy-en-Brie (French pronunciation: [livɛʁdi ɑ̃ bʁi], literally Liverdy in Brie) is a commune in the Seine-et-Marne departement in the Île-de-France region in north-central France.

== Demographics ==
Inhabitants are called Liverdois.

== See also ==
- Communes of the Seine-et-Marne department
