= Fontenay-Trésigny =

- Commune
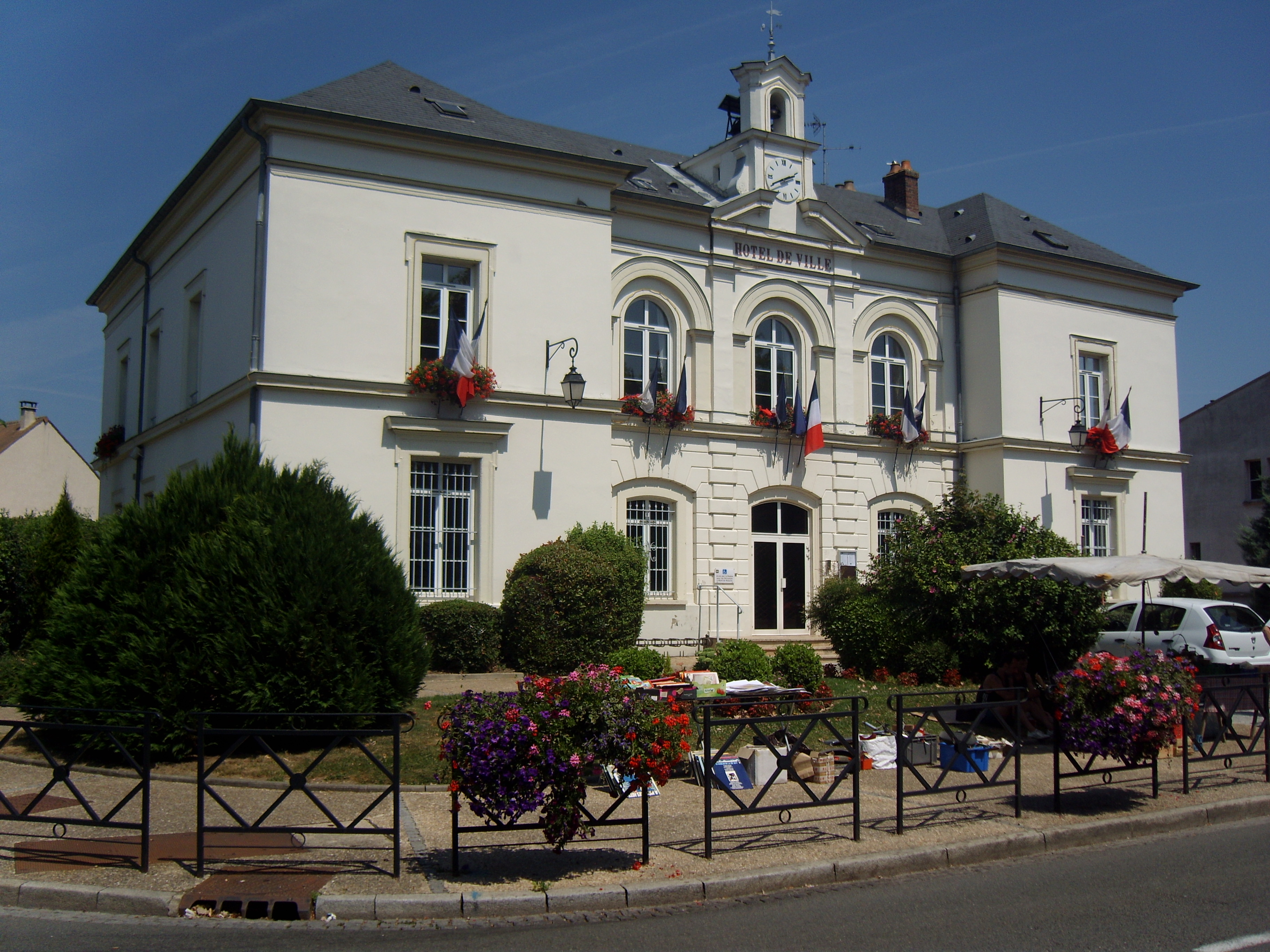
- Town Hall of Fontenay-Trésigny

- Coat of arms
- Location of Fontenay-Trésigny
- Location within France Location within Île-de-France (region)
- Coordinates: 48°42′27″N 2°51′51″E
- Country: France
- Region: Île-de-France
- Department: Seine-et-Marne
- Arrondissement: Provins
- Canton: Fontenay-Trésigny
- Intercommunality: CC Val Briard

Government
  - Mayor (2020–2026): Patrick Rossilli
- Area^{1}: 22.12 km^{2} (8.54 sq mi)
- Highest elevation: 123 m (404 ft)
- Lowest elevation: 75 m (246 ft)
- Population (2023): 5,994
  - Density: 271.0/km^{2} (701.8/sq mi)
- Time zone: UTC+01:00 (CET)
  - Summer (DST): UTC+02:00 (CEST)
- INSEE/Postal code: 77192 /77610
- ^{1} French Land Register data, which excludes lakes, ponds, glaciers > 1 km^{2} (0.386 sq mi or 247 acres) and river estuaries.

Fontenay-Trésigny (French pronunciation: [fɔ̃tnɛ tʁeziɲi]) is a commune in the Seine-et-Marne department in the Île-de-France region in north-central France.

== Location ==
Fontenay-Trésigny is located 43 km southeast of Paris, 24 km northeast of Melun, 28 km south of Meaux and 36 km northwest of Provins.

Fontenay-Trésigny lies in the heart of the Brie, in a strategic position in the center of the department of Seine-et-Marne.

== Demographics ==
Inhabitants of Fontenay-Trésigny are called Trésifontains in French.

Historical population
Year	Pop.	±% p.a.
1968	2,042	—
1975	2,812	+4.68%
1982	3,638	+3.75%
1990	4,518	+2.74%
1999	4,620	+0.25%
2007	5,015	+1.03%
2012	5,267	+0.99%
2017	5,574	+1.14%
2023	5,994	+1.22%
Source: INSEE

== See also ==
- Château du duc d'Épernon, Fontenay
- Communes of the Seine-et-Marne department
