= Marles-en-Brie =

- Commune
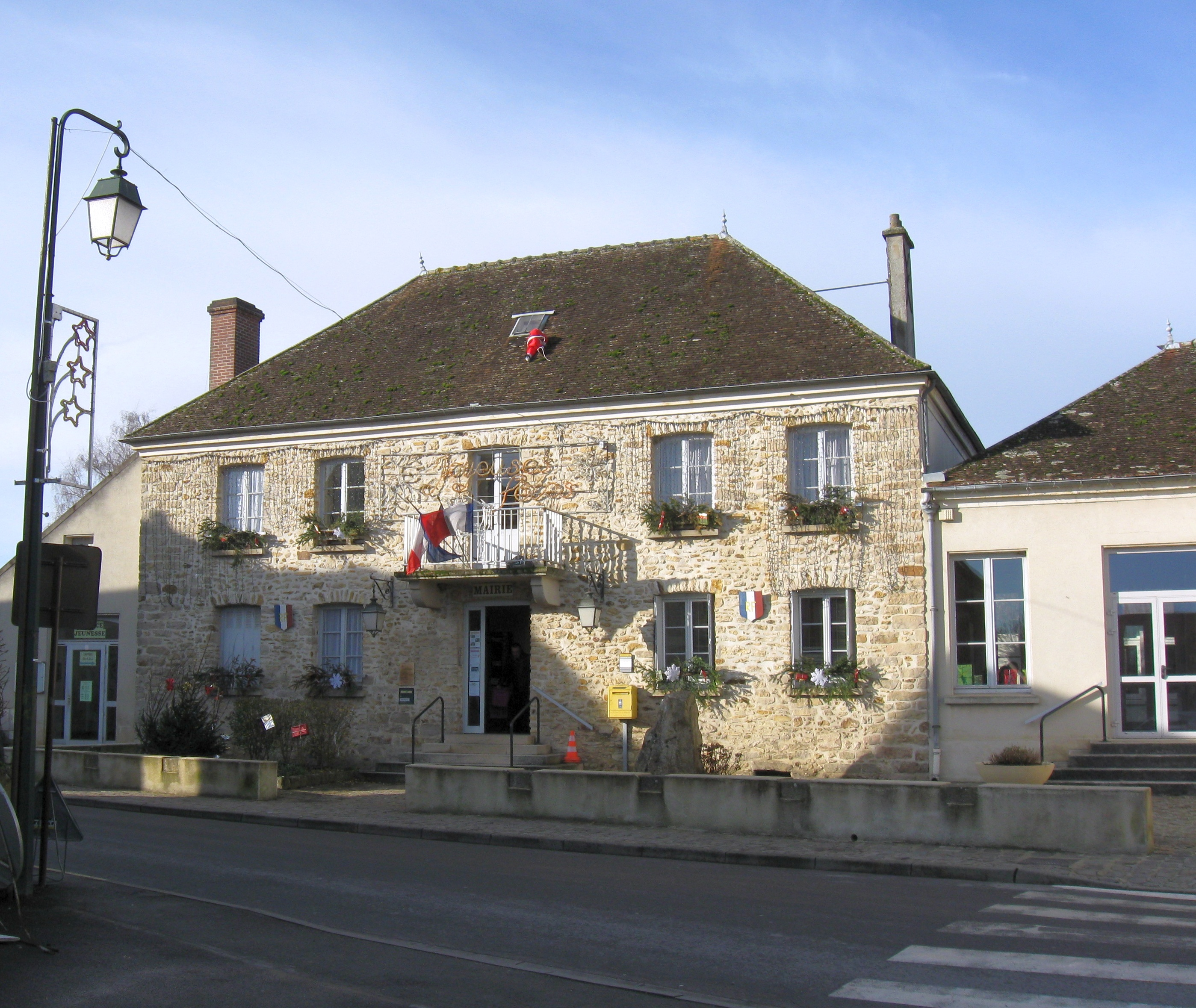
- The town hall in Marles-en-Brie

- Coat of arms
- Location of Marles-en-Brie
- Location within France Location within Île-de-France (region)
- Coordinates: 48°43′42″N 2°52′46″E
- Country: France
- Region: Île-de-France
- Department: Seine-et-Marne
- Arrondissement: Provins
- Canton: Fontenay-Trésigny
- Intercommunality: CC Val Briard

Government
  - Mayor (2020–2026): Patrick Poisot
- Area^{1}: 12.78 km^{2} (4.93 sq mi)
- Highest elevation: 114 m (374 ft)
- Lowest elevation: 102 m (335 ft)
- Population (2023): 1,898
  - Density: 148.5/km^{2} (384.6/sq mi)
- Time zone: UTC+01:00 (CET)
  - Summer (DST): UTC+02:00 (CEST)
- INSEE/Postal code: 77277 /77610
- ^{1} French Land Register data, which excludes lakes, ponds, glaciers > 1 km^{2} (0.386 sq mi or 247 acres) and river estuaries.

Marles-en-Brie (French pronunciation: [maʁl ɑ̃ bʁi], literally Marles in Brie) is a commune in the Seine-et-Marne department in the Île-de-France region in north-central France.

== Demographics ==
Inhabitants are called Marlois.

== See also ==
- Communes of the Seine-et-Marne department
