= Pécy =

- Commune
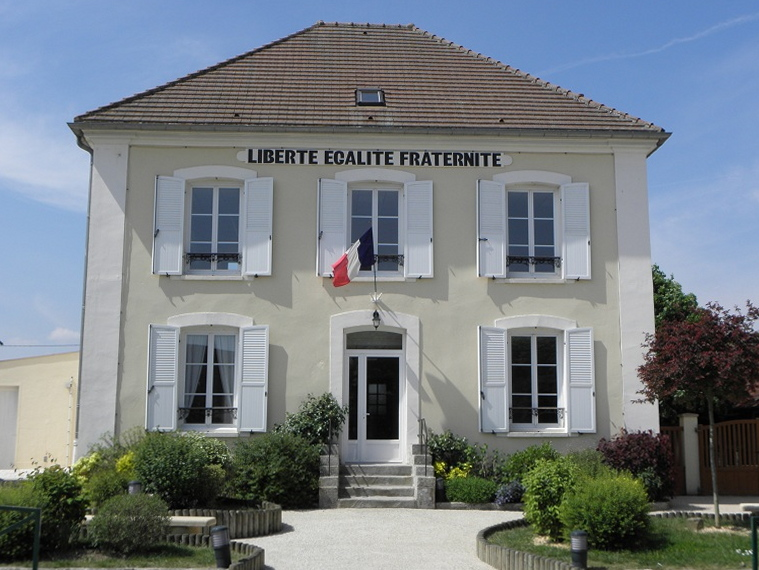
- The town hall in Pécy

- Coat of arms
- Location of Pécy
- Location within France Location within Île-de-France (region)
- Coordinates: 48°39′24″N 3°04′45″E
- Country: France
- Region: Île-de-France
- Department: Seine-et-Marne
- Arrondissement: Provins
- Canton: Fontenay-Trésigny
- Intercommunality: CC Val Briard

Government
  - Mayor (2020–2026): Bruno Gainand
- Area^{1}: 21.07 km^{2} (8.14 sq mi)
- Highest elevation: 145 m (476 ft)
- Lowest elevation: 109 m (358 ft)
- Population (2023): 849
  - Density: 40.3/km^{2} (104/sq mi)
- Time zone: UTC+01:00 (CET)
  - Summer (DST): UTC+02:00 (CEST)
- INSEE/Postal code: 77357 /77970
- ^{1} French Land Register data, which excludes lakes, ponds, glaciers > 1 km^{2} (0.386 sq mi or 247 acres) and river estuaries.

Pécy (French pronunciation: [pesi]) is a commune in the Seine-et-Marne department in the Île-de-France region in north-central France.

== Demographics ==
Inhabitants are called Péciacquois.

== See also ==
- Communes of the Seine-et-Marne department
