= Rozay-en-Brie =

- Commune
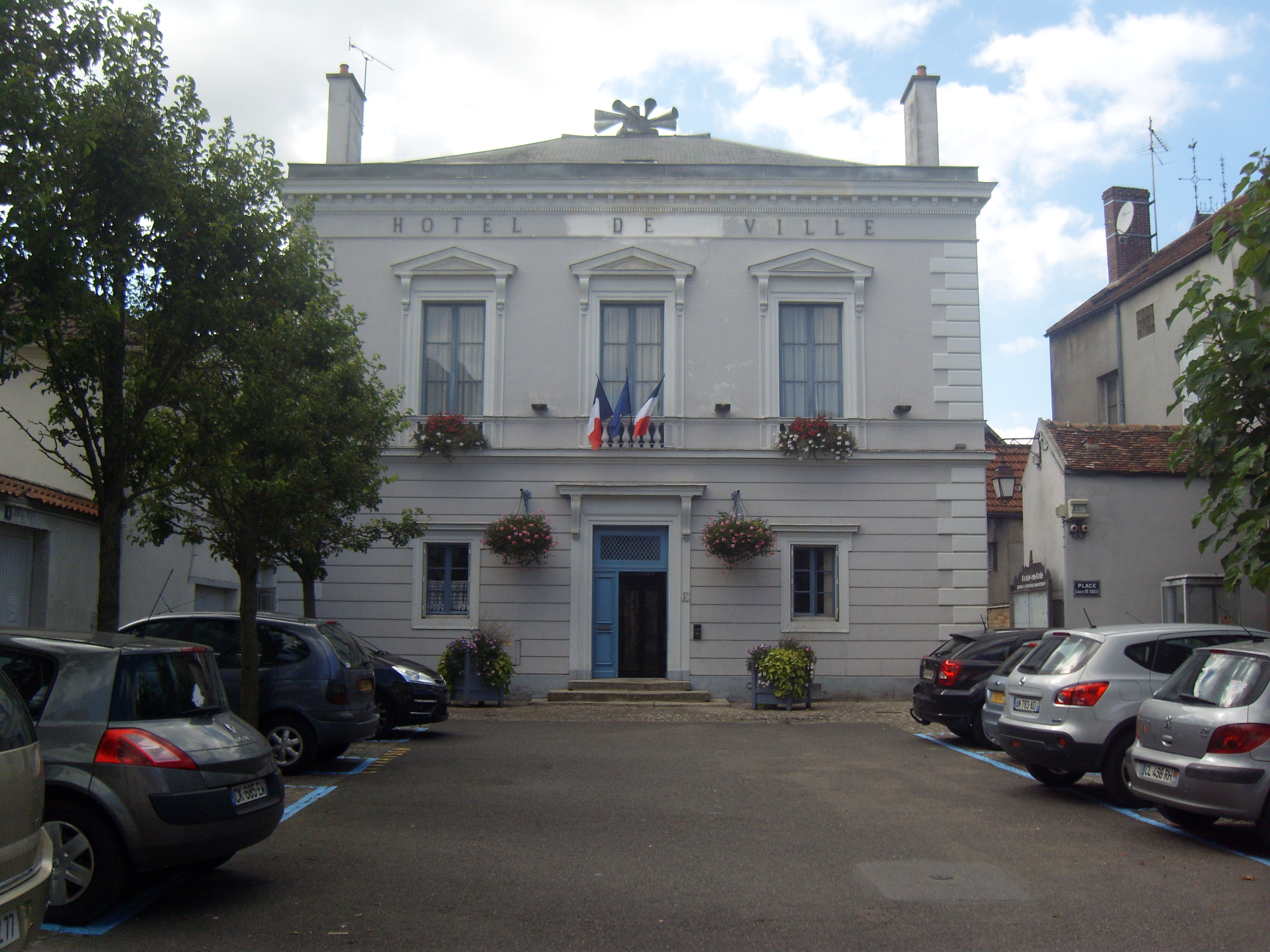
- The town hall in Rozay-en-Brie

- Coat of arms
- Location of Rozay-en-Brie
- Location within France Location within Île-de-France (region)
- Coordinates: 48°41′00″N 2°58′00″E
- Country: France
- Region: Île-de-France
- Department: Seine-et-Marne
- Arrondissement: Provins
- Canton: Fontenay-Trésigny
- Intercommunality: CC Val Briard

Government
  - Mayor (2020–2026): Patrick Percik
- Area^{1}: 3.17 km^{2} (1.22 sq mi)
- Highest elevation: 110 m (360 ft)
- Lowest elevation: 81 m (266 ft)
- Population (2023): 2,860
  - Density: 902/km^{2} (2,340/sq mi)
- Time zone: UTC+01:00 (CET)
  - Summer (DST): UTC+02:00 (CEST)
- INSEE/Postal code: 77393 /77540
- ^{1} French Land Register data, which excludes lakes, ponds, glaciers > 1 km^{2} (0.386 sq mi or 247 acres) and river estuaries.

Rozay-en-Brie (French pronunciation: [ʁɔzɛ ɑ̃ bʁi], literally Rozay in Brie) is a commune in the Seine-et-Marne department in the Île-de-France region in north-central France.

== Population ==
Inhabitants of Rozay-en-Brie are called Rozéens in French.

Historical population

| Year | Pop. | ±% p.a. |
|---|---|---|
| 1793 | 1,600 | — |
| 1800 | 1,450 | −1.40% |
| 1806 | 1,370 | −0.94% |
| 1821 | 1,417 | +0.23% |
| 1831 | 1,383 | −0.24% |
| 1836 | 1,456 | +1.03% |
| 1841 | 1,513 | +0.77% |
| 1846 | 1,420 | −1.26% |
| 1851 | 1,502 | +1.13% |
| 1856 | 1,417 | −1.16% |
| 1861 | 1,489 | +1.00% |
| 1866 | 1,568 | +1.04% |
| 1872 | 1,548 | −0.21% |
| 1876 | 1,593 | +0.72% |
| 1881 | 1,569 | −0.30% |
| 1886 | 1,531 | −0.49% |
| 1891 | 1,368 | −2.23% |
| 1896 | 1,390 | +0.32% |
| 1901 | 1,354 | −0.52% |

| Year | Pop. | ±% p.a. |
|---|---|---|
| 1906 | 1,406 | +0.76% |
| 1911 | 1,246 | −2.39% |
| 1921 | 1,079 | −1.43% |
| 1926 | 1,108 | +0.53% |
| 1931 | 1,120 | +0.22% |
| 1936 | 1,127 | +0.12% |
| 1946 | 1,214 | +0.75% |
| 1954 | 1,338 | +1.22% |
| 1962 | 1,483 | +1.29% |
| 1968 | 1,521 | +0.42% |
| 1975 | 1,768 | +2.17% |
| 1982 | 1,914 | +1.14% |
| 1990 | 2,380 | +2.76% |
| 1999 | 2,613 | +1.04% |
| 2007 | 2,712 | +0.47% |
| 2012 | 2,816 | +0.76% |
| 2017 | 2,826 | +0.07% |
| 2023 | 2,860 | +0.20% |

Source: EHESS and INSEE

== Notable people ==
- Claudine de Culam, (1585-1601) prosecuted and executed for bestiality
- Vladimir (Tikhonicky), (1873-1959) Eastern Orthodox archbishop and metropolitan
- Christian Jacob, (1959) politician
- Sébastien Japrisot, (1931-2003) author, screenwriter, director

== See also ==
- Communes of the Seine-et-Marne department
