= Crèvecœur-en-Brie =

- Commune
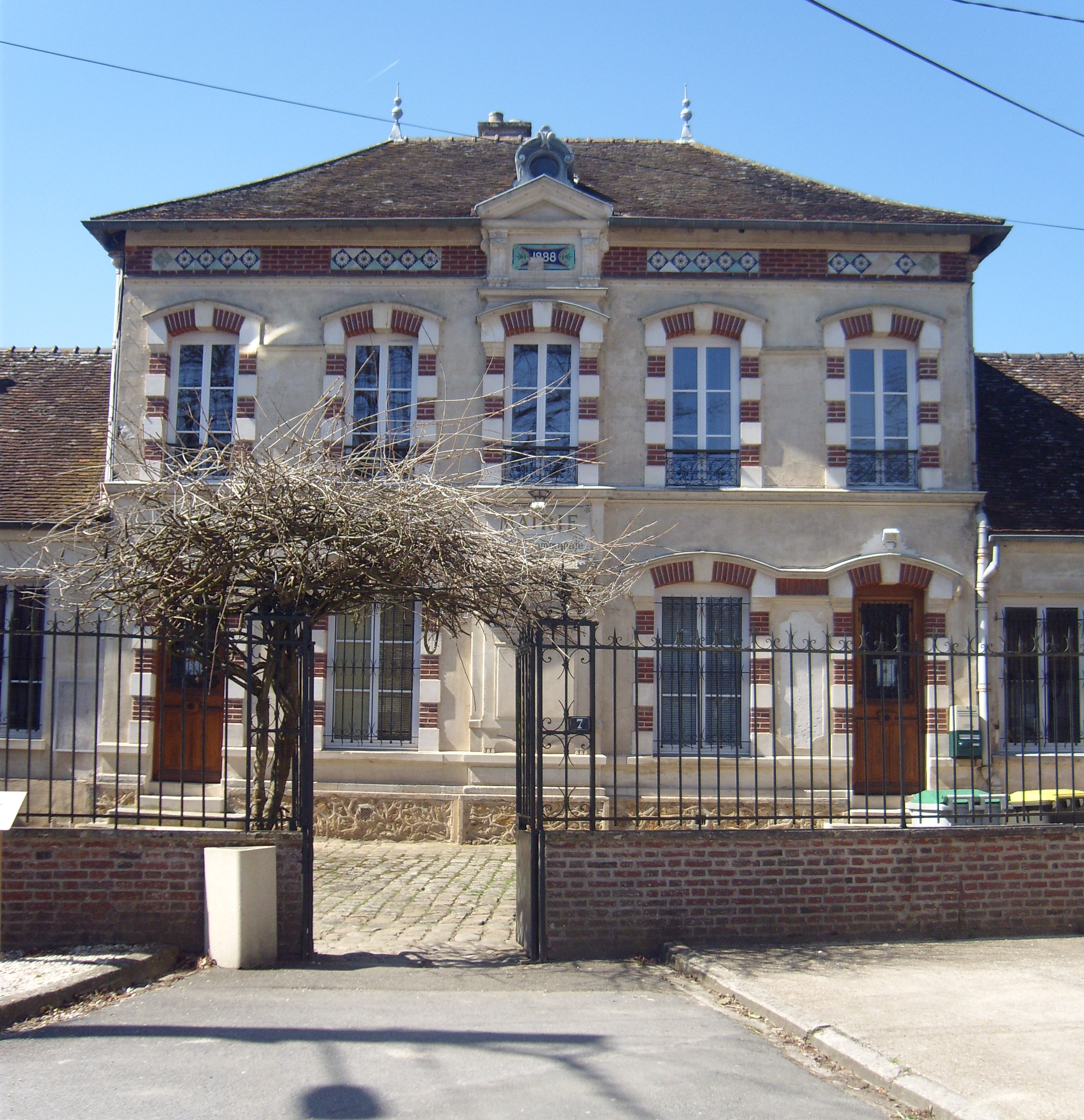
- The town hall in Crèvecœur-en-Brie

- Coat of arms
- Location of Crèvecœur-en-Brie
- Location within France Location within Île-de-France (region)
- Coordinates: 48°45′14″N 2°54′28″E
- Country: France
- Region: Île-de-France
- Department: Seine-et-Marne
- Arrondissement: Provins
- Canton: Fontenay-Trésigny
- Intercommunality: CC Val Briard

Government
  - Mayor (2020–2026): Marc Cuypers
- Area^{1}: 9.19 km^{2} (3.55 sq mi)
- Highest elevation: 122 m (400 ft)
- Lowest elevation: 109 m (358 ft)
- Population (2023): 437
  - Density: 47.6/km^{2} (123/sq mi)
- Time zone: UTC+01:00 (CET)
  - Summer (DST): UTC+02:00 (CEST)
- INSEE/Postal code: 77144 /77610
- ^{1} French Land Register data, which excludes lakes, ponds, glaciers > 1 km^{2} (0.386 sq mi or 247 acres) and river estuaries.

Crèvecœur-en-Brie (French pronunciation: [kʁɛvkœʁ ɑ̃ bʁi]; lit. 'Crèvecœur-in-Brie') is a commune in the Seine-et-Marne department in the Île-de-France region in northern France.

== Demographics ==
Inhabitants of Crèvecœur-en-Brie are called Crépicordiens.

== See also ==
- Communes of the Seine-et-Marne department
