= Presles-en-Brie =

- Commune
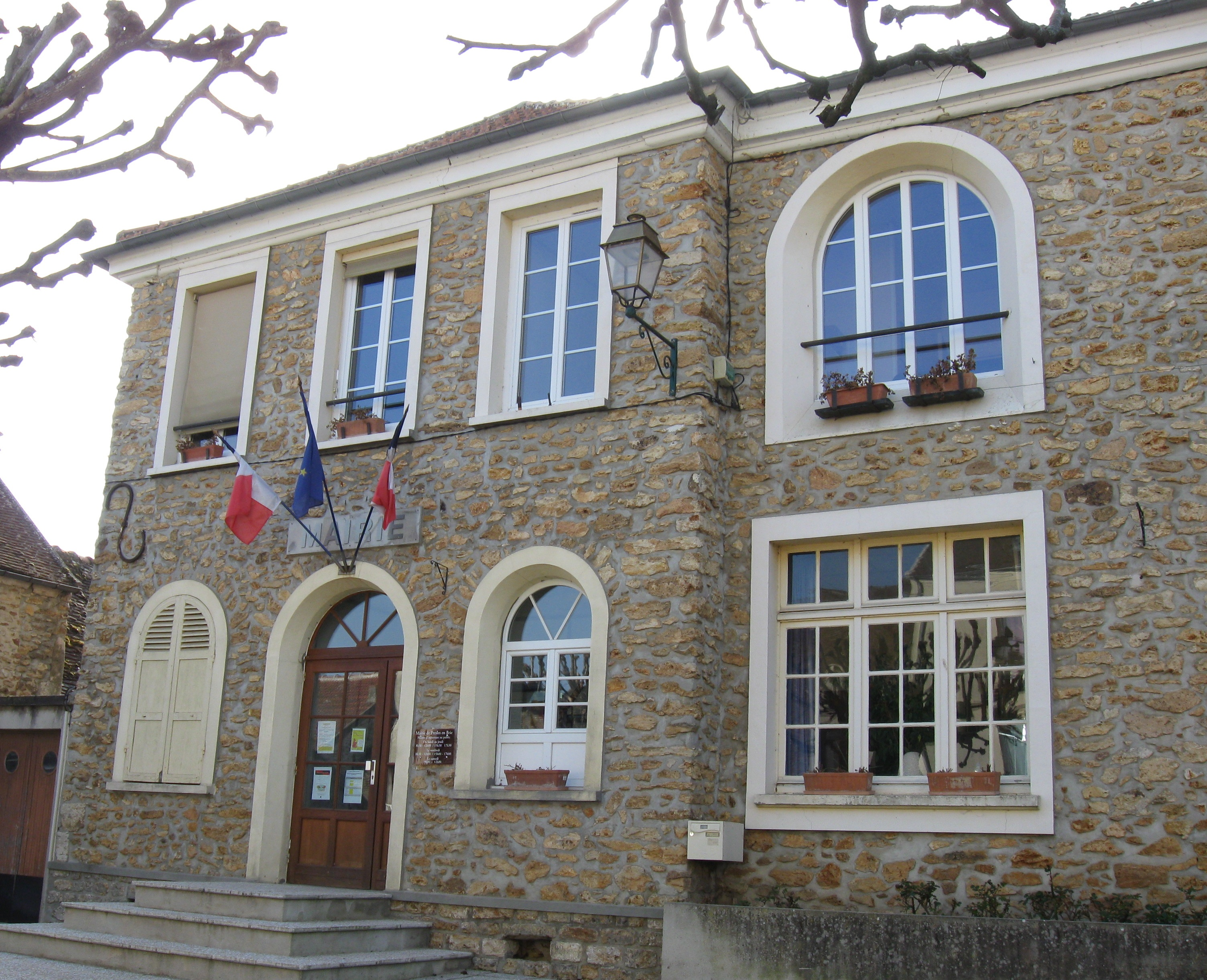
- The town hall in Presles-en-Brie
- Location of Presles-en-Brie
- Location within France Location within Île-de-France (region)
- Coordinates: 48°42′54″N 2°44′30″E
- Country: France
- Region: Île-de-France
- Department: Seine-et-Marne
- Arrondissement: Provins
- Canton: Fontenay-Trésigny
- Intercommunality: CC Val Briard

Government
  - Mayor (2020–2026): Dominique Rodriguez
- Area^{1}: 17.39 km^{2} (6.71 sq mi)
- Highest elevation: 107 m (351 ft)
- Lowest elevation: 78 m (256 ft)
- Population (2023): 2,369
  - Density: 136.2/km^{2} (352.8/sq mi)
- Time zone: UTC+01:00 (CET)
  - Summer (DST): UTC+02:00 (CEST)
- INSEE/Postal code: 77377 /77220
- ^{1} French Land Register data, which excludes lakes, ponds, glaciers > 1 km^{2} (0.386 sq mi or 247 acres) and river estuaries.

Presles-en-Brie (French pronunciation: [pʁɛl ɑ̃ bʁi], lit. 'Presles in Brie') is a commune in the Seine-et-Marne department in the Île-de-France region in north-central France.

== Population ==
Historical population
Year	Pop.	±% p.a.
1968	596	—
1975	1,506	+14.16%
1982	1,526	+0.19%
1990	1,620	+0.75%
1999	1,680	+0.40%
2007	2,067	+2.63%
2012	2,288	+2.05%
2017	2,312	+0.21%
2023	2,369	+0.41%
Source: INSEE

The inhabitants are known as Preslois in French.

== Twin towns ==
It is twinned with Wavendon, England.

== See also ==
- Communes of the Seine-et-Marne department
