= Lumigny-Nesles-Ormeaux =

- Commune
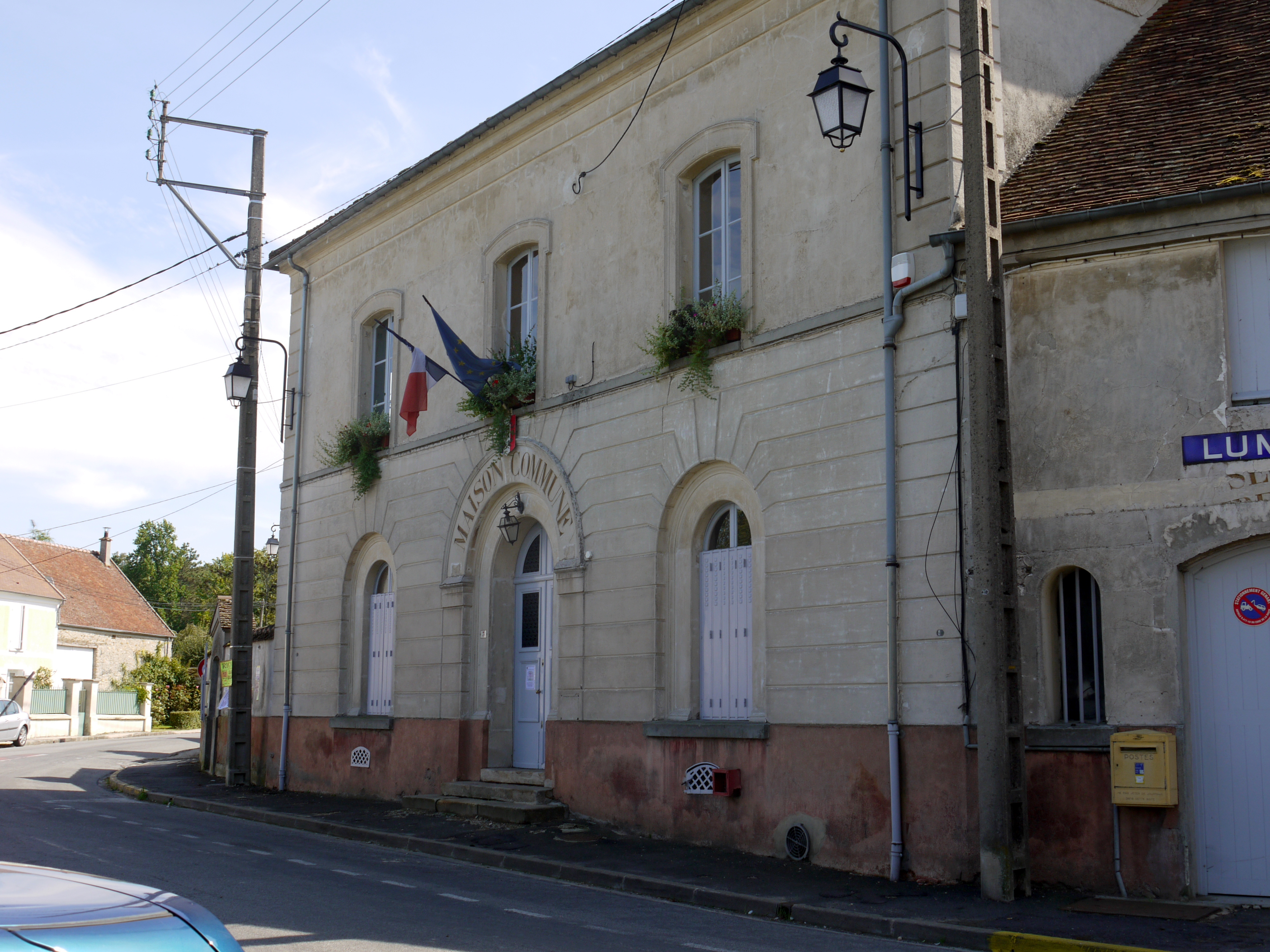
- The town hall in Lumigny

- Coat of arms
- Location of Lumigny-Nesles-Ormeaux
- Location within France Location within Île-de-France (region)
- Coordinates: 48°44′15″N 2°57′10″E
- Country: France
- Region: Île-de-France
- Department: Seine-et-Marne
- Arrondissement: Provins
- Canton: Fontenay-Trésigny
- Intercommunality: CC Val Briard

Government
  - Mayor (2020–2026): Pascale Levaillant
- Area^{1}: 36.30 km^{2} (14.02 sq mi)
- Highest elevation: 158 m (518 ft)
- Lowest elevation: 82 m (269 ft)
- Population (2023): 1,468
  - Density: 40.44/km^{2} (104.7/sq mi)
- Time zone: UTC+01:00 (CET)
  - Summer (DST): UTC+02:00 (CEST)
- INSEE/Postal code: 77264 /77540
- ^{1} French Land Register data, which excludes lakes, ponds, glaciers > 1 km^{2} (0.386 sq mi or 247 acres) and river estuaries.

Lumigny-Nesles-Ormeaux (French pronunciation: [lymiɲi nɛl ɔʁmo]) is a commune in the Seine-et-Marne department in the Île-de-France region in north-central France. The commune was created in 1973 by the merger of three villages: Lumigny, Nesles-la-Gilberde and Ormeaux.

On the northern side is Parc des Félins, a 60-hectare captive breeding reserve for big cats, covering 25 of the world's 41 species.

Ira and Edita Morris, who set up the Hiroshima Foundation for Peace and Culture, used to live in Nesles.

== Demographics ==
The inhabitants are called Luminiciens (in Lumigny) or Neslois (in Nesles).

== See also ==
- Communes of the Seine-et-Marne department
