= Voinsles =

- Commune
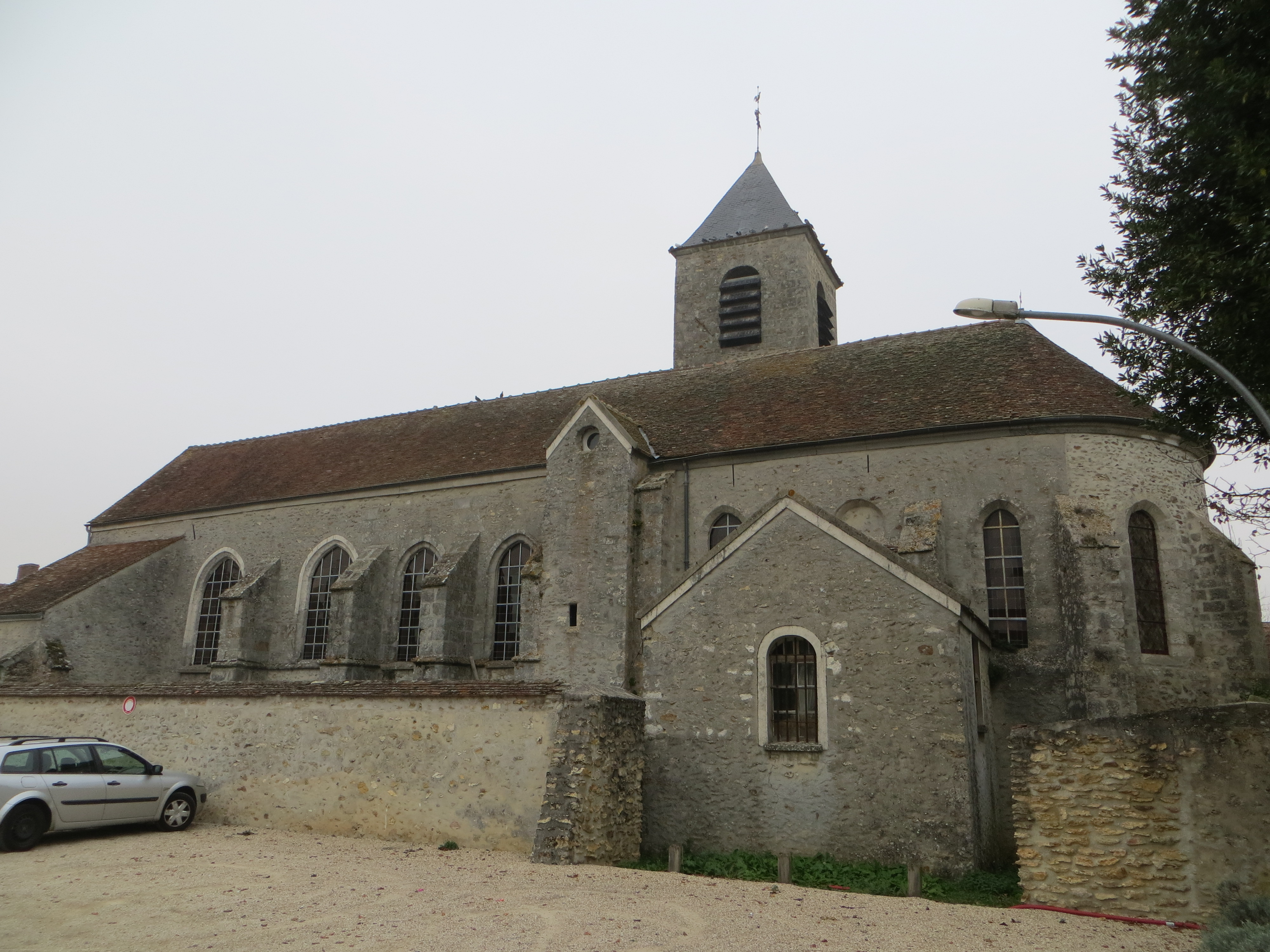
- The church in Voinsles
- Location of Voinsles
- Location within France Location within Île-de-France (region)
- Coordinates: 48°41′29″N 3°00′19″E
- Country: France
- Region: Île-de-France
- Department: Seine-et-Marne
- Arrondissement: Provins
- Canton: Fontenay-Trésigny
- Intercommunality: Val Briard

Government
  - Mayor (2020–2026): Évelyne Rietsch
- Area^{1}: 28.44 km^{2} (10.98 sq mi)
- Highest elevation: 133 m (436 ft)
- Lowest elevation: 86 m (282 ft)
- Population (2023): 580
  - Density: 20/km^{2} (53/sq mi)
- Time zone: UTC+01:00 (CET)
  - Summer (DST): UTC+02:00 (CEST)
- INSEE/Postal code: 77527 /77540
- ^{1} French Land Register data, which excludes lakes, ponds, glaciers > 1 km^{2} (0.386 sq mi or 247 acres) and river estuaries.

Voinsles (French pronunciation: [vwɛ̃l]) is a commune in the Seine-et-Marne department in the Île-de-France region in north-central France.

== Demographics ==
Inhabitants of Voinsles are called Vincelais.

== See also ==
- Communes of the Seine-et-Marne department
