= La Chapelle-Iger =

- Commune
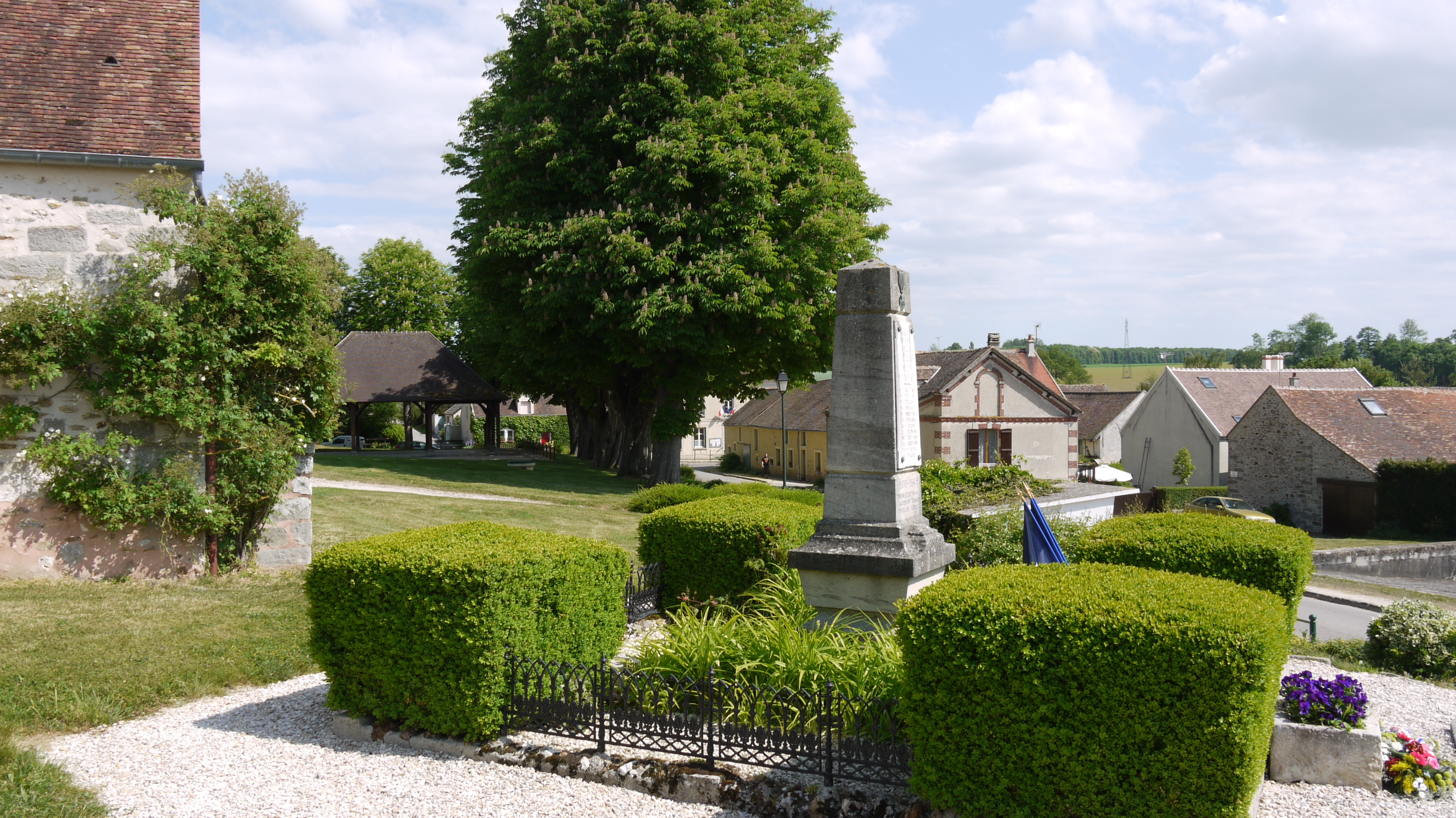
- The war memorial in La Chapelle-Iger

- Coat of arms
- Location of La Chapelle-Iger
- Location within France Location within Île-de-France (region)
- Coordinates: 48°39′10″N 2°59′23″E
- Country: France
- Region: Île-de-France
- Department: Seine-et-Marne
- Arrondissement: Provins
- Canton: Fontenay-Trésigny
- Intercommunality: CC Val Briard

Government
  - Mayor (2020–2026): Ludovic Perrin
- Area^{1}: 8.73 km^{2} (3.37 sq mi)
- Highest elevation: 130 m (430 ft)
- Lowest elevation: 89 m (292 ft)
- Population (2023): 191
  - Density: 21.9/km^{2} (56.7/sq mi)
- Time zone: UTC+01:00 (CET)
  - Summer (DST): UTC+02:00 (CEST)
- INSEE/Postal code: 77087 /77540
- ^{1} French Land Register data, which excludes lakes, ponds, glaciers > 1 km^{2} (0.386 sq mi or 247 acres) and river estuaries.

La Chapelle-Iger is a commune in the Seine-et-Marne department in the Île-de-France region north-central France.

== Demographics ==
The inhabitants are called Capalligérois.

== See also ==
- Communes of the Seine-et-Marne department
