= Courpalay =

- Commune
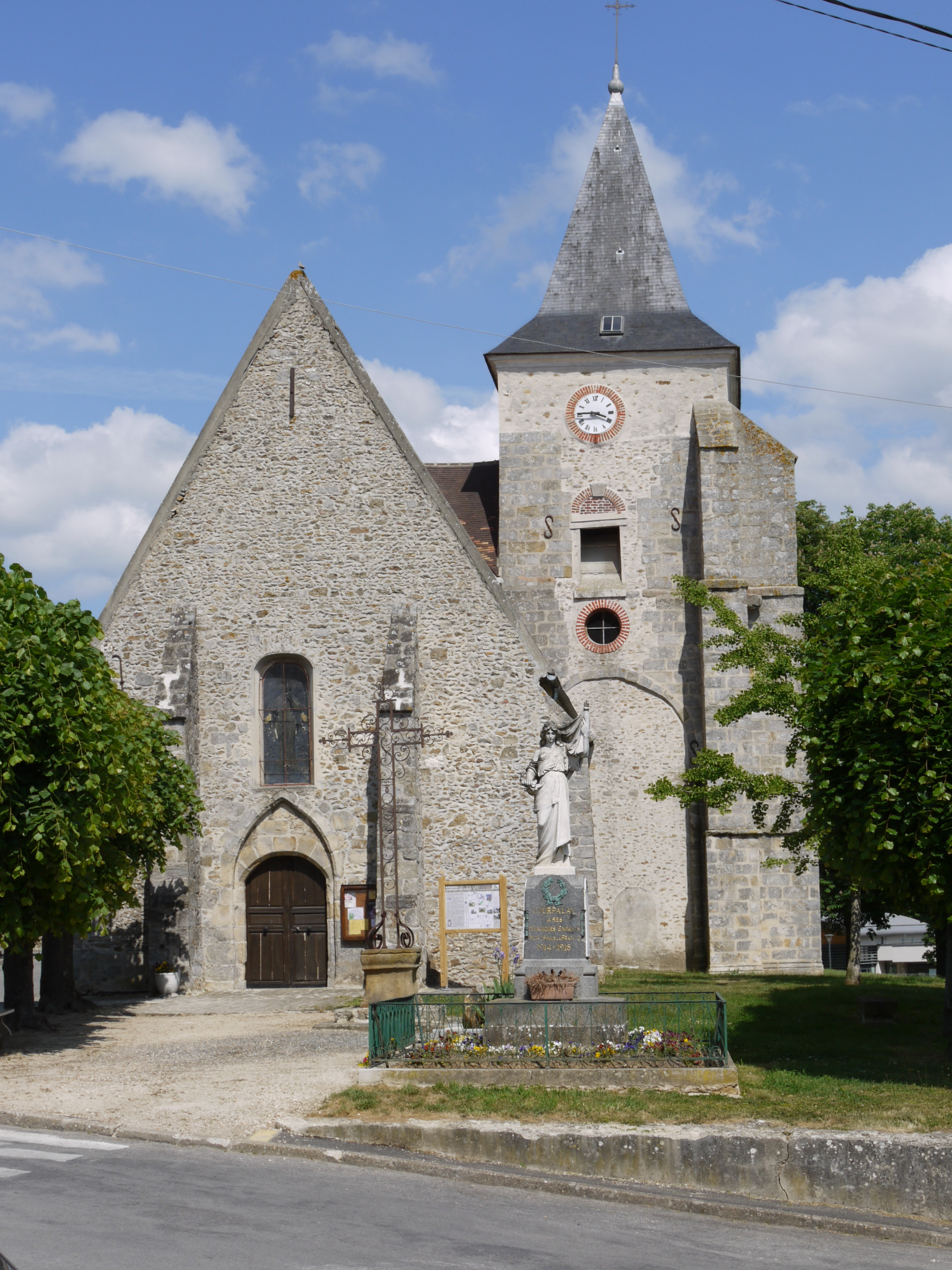
- The church in Courpalay

- Coat of arms
- Location of Courpalay
- Location within France Location within Île-de-France (region)
- Coordinates: 48°38′51″N 2°57′32″E
- Country: France
- Region: Île-de-France
- Department: Seine-et-Marne
- Arrondissement: Provins
- Canton: Fontenay-Trésigny
- Intercommunality: CC Val Briard

Government
  - Mayor (2022–2026): Elisabeth Garnot
- Area^{1}: 14.56 km^{2} (5.62 sq mi)
- Highest elevation: 122 m (400 ft)
- Lowest elevation: 79 m (259 ft)
- Population (2023): 1,610
  - Density: 111/km^{2} (286/sq mi)
- Time zone: UTC+01:00 (CET)
  - Summer (DST): UTC+02:00 (CEST)
- INSEE/Postal code: 77135 /77540
- ^{1} French Land Register data, which excludes lakes, ponds, glaciers > 1 km^{2} (0.386 sq mi or 247 acres) and river estuaries.

Courpalay (French pronunciation: [kuʁpalɛ]) is a commune in the Seine-et-Marne department in the Île-de-France region in north-central France.

== Demographics ==
The inhabitants are called Courpaliens.

== See also ==
- Château de la Grange-Bléneau
- Communes of the Seine-et-Marne department
