= Les Chapelles-Bourbon =

- Commune
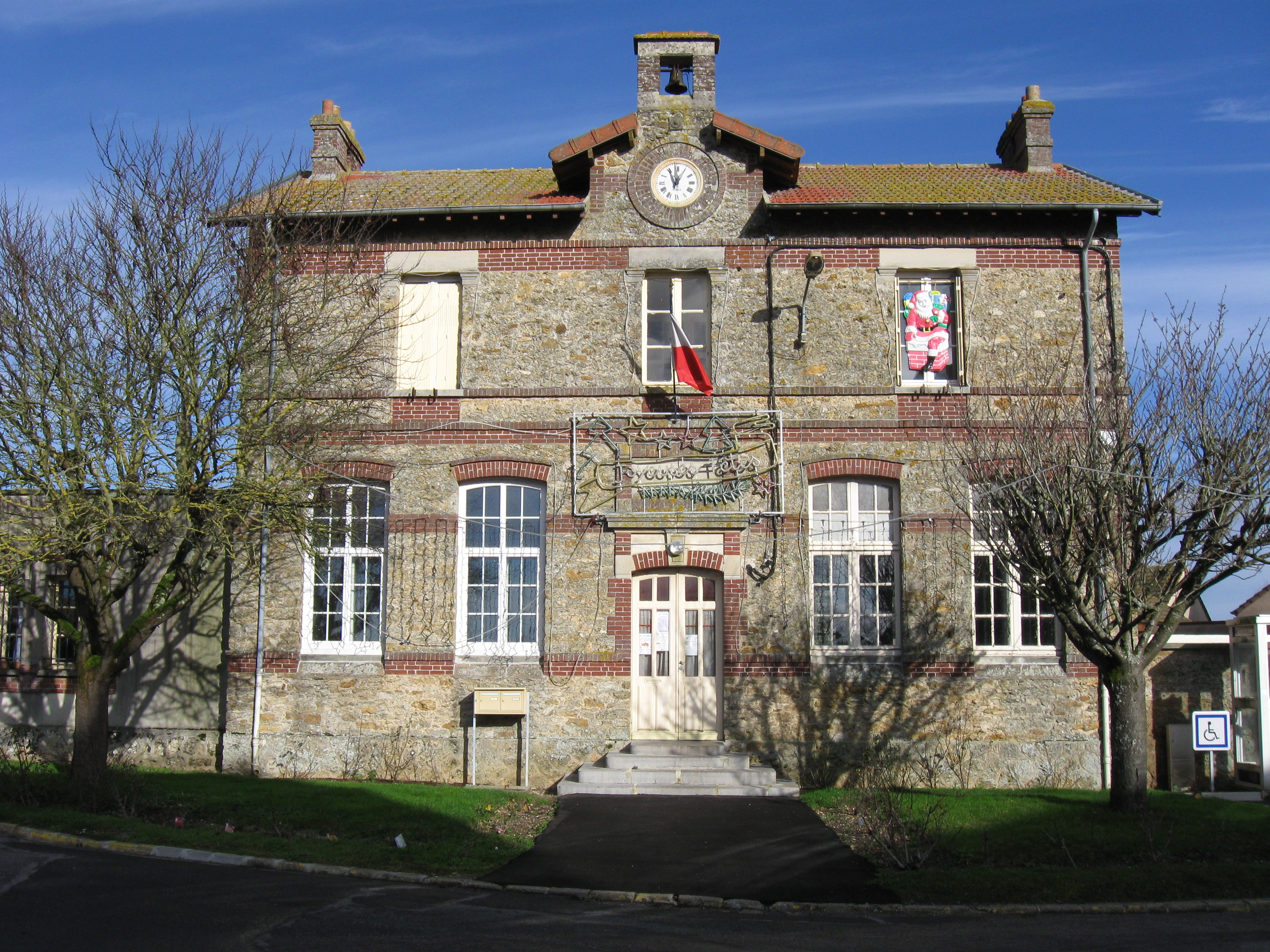
- The town hall in Les Chapelles-Bourbon

- Coat of arms
- Location of Les Chapelles-Bourbon
- Location within France Location within Île-de-France (region)
- Coordinates: 48°44′29″N 2°50′29″E
- Country: France
- Region: Île-de-France
- Department: Seine-et-Marne
- Arrondissement: Provins
- Canton: Fontenay-Trésigny
- Intercommunality: CC Val Briard

Government
  - Mayor (2020–2026): Anne Parisy
- Area^{1}: 6.42 km^{2} (2.48 sq mi)
- Highest elevation: 118 m (387 ft)
- Lowest elevation: 108 m (354 ft)
- Population (2023): 459
  - Density: 71.5/km^{2} (185/sq mi)
- Time zone: UTC+01:00 (CET)
  - Summer (DST): UTC+02:00 (CEST)
- INSEE/Postal code: 77091 /77610
- ^{1} French Land Register data, which excludes lakes, ponds, glaciers > 1 km^{2} (0.386 sq mi or 247 acres) and river estuaries.

Les Chapelles-Bourbon (French pronunciation: [le ʃapɛl buʁbɔ̃]) is a commune in the Seine-et-Marne department in the Île-de-France region in north-central France.

== See also ==
- Communes of the Seine-et-Marne department
