= Bernay-Vilbert =

- Commune
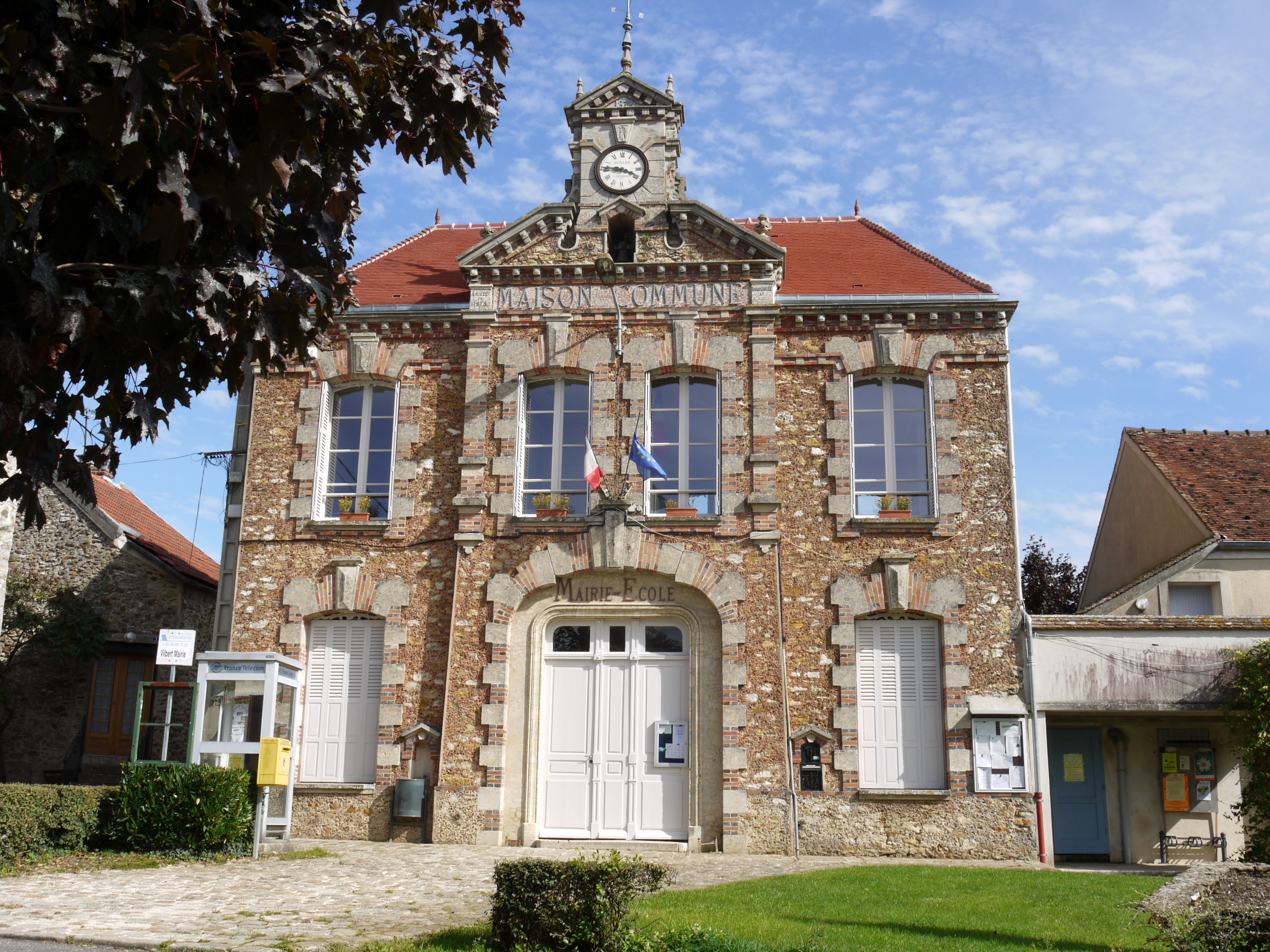
- The town hall in Vilbert

- Coat of arms
- Location of Bernay-Vilbert
- Location within France Location within Île-de-France (region)
- Coordinates: 48°40′37″N 2°56′18″E
- Country: France
- Region: Île-de-France
- Department: Seine-et-Marne
- Arrondissement: Provins
- Canton: Fontenay-Trésigny
- Intercommunality: CC Val Briard

Government
  - Mayor (2022–2026): Sandrine Rene
- Area^{1}: 16.92 km^{2} (6.53 sq mi)
- Highest elevation: 114 m (374 ft)
- Lowest elevation: 77 m (253 ft)
- Population (2023): 1,005
  - Density: 59.40/km^{2} (153.8/sq mi)
- Time zone: UTC+01:00 (CET)
  - Summer (DST): UTC+02:00 (CEST)
- INSEE/Postal code: 77031 /77540
- ^{1} French Land Register data, which excludes lakes, ponds, glaciers > 1 km^{2} (0.386 sq mi or 247 acres) and river estuaries.

Bernay-Vilbert (French pronunciation: [bɛʁnɛ vilbɛʁ]) is a commune in the Seine-et-Marne department in the Île-de-France region in north-central France.

== Demographics ==
The inhabitants are called Bernéens-Vilbertiens.

== See also ==
- Communes of the Seine-et-Marne department
