= Mortcerf =

- Commune
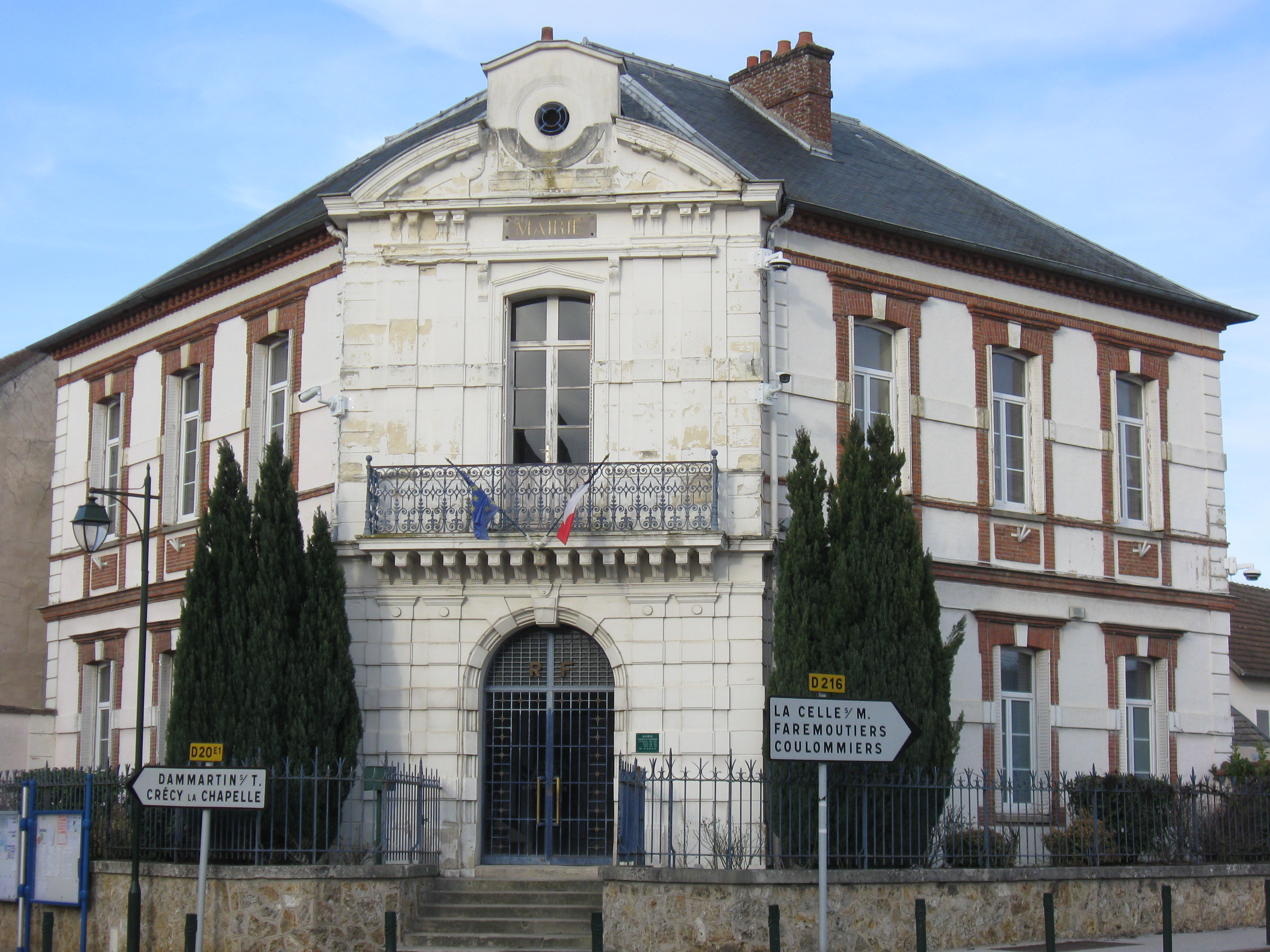
- The town hall in Mortcerf

- Coat of arms
- Location of Mortcerf
- Location within France Location within Île-de-France (region)
- Coordinates: 48°47′25″N 2°55′03″E
- Country: France
- Region: Île-de-France
- Department: Seine-et-Marne
- Arrondissement: Provins
- Canton: Fontenay-Trésigny
- Intercommunality: CC Val Briard

Government
  - Mayor (2020–2026): Christian Bouvier
- Area^{1}: 17.84 km^{2} (6.89 sq mi)
- Highest elevation: 140 m (460 ft)
- Lowest elevation: 74 m (243 ft)
- Population (2023): 1,400
  - Density: 78/km^{2} (200/sq mi)
- Time zone: UTC+01:00 (CET)
  - Summer (DST): UTC+02:00 (CEST)
- INSEE/Postal code: 77318 /77163
- ^{1} French Land Register data, which excludes lakes, ponds, glaciers > 1 km^{2} (0.386 sq mi or 247 acres) and river estuaries.

Mortcerf (French pronunciation: [mɔʁsɛʁf]) is a commune in the Seine-et-Marne department in the Île-de-France region in north-central France.

== Demographics ==
Inhabitants are called Moressartois.

== See also ==
- Communes of the Seine-et-Marne department
