= Favières, Seine-et-Marne =

Favières
- Commune
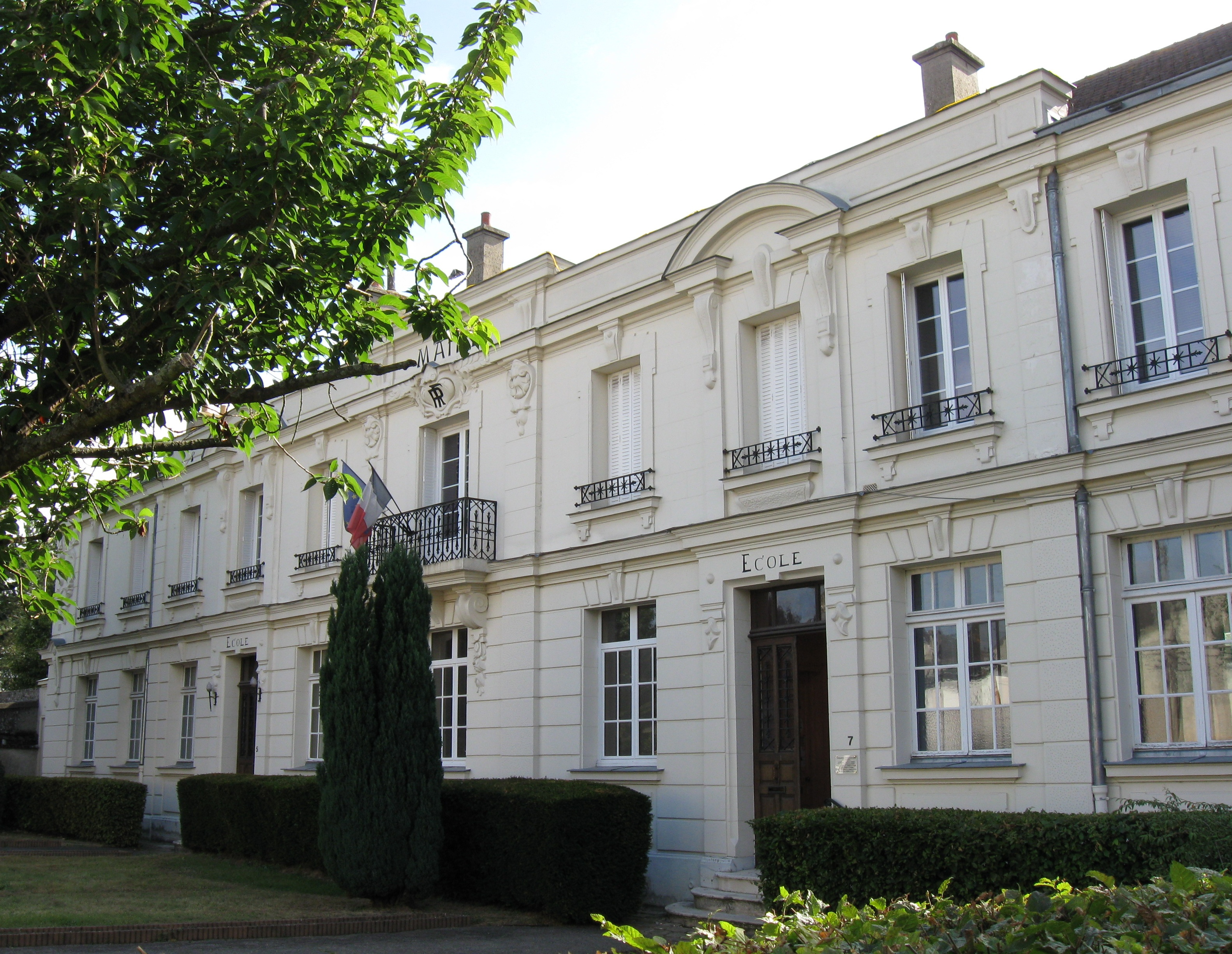
- The town hall in Favières
- Location of Favières
- Location within France Location within Île-de-France (region)
- Coordinates: 48°45′47″N 2°46′31″E
- Country: France
- Region: Île-de-France
- Department: Seine-et-Marne
- Arrondissement: Provins
- Canton: Ozoir-la-Ferrière
- Intercommunality: CC Val Briard

Government
  - Mayor (2020–2026): Daniel Patu
- Area^{1}: 28.27 km^{2} (10.92 sq mi)
- Highest elevation: 126 m (413 ft)
- Lowest elevation: 92 m (302 ft)
- Population (2023): 1,316
  - Density: 46.55/km^{2} (120.6/sq mi)
- Time zone: UTC+01:00 (CET)
  - Summer (DST): UTC+02:00 (CEST)
- INSEE/Postal code: 77177 /77220
- ^{1} French Land Register data, which excludes lakes, ponds, glaciers > 1 km^{2} (0.386 sq mi or 247 acres) and river estuaries.

Favières (French pronunciation: [favjɛʁ]) is a commune in the Seine-et-Marne department in the Île-de-France region in north-central France.

== Demographics ==
Inhabitants of Favières are called Favièrois.

== See also ==
- Communes of the Seine-et-Marne department
