= Vaudoy-en-Brie =

- Commune
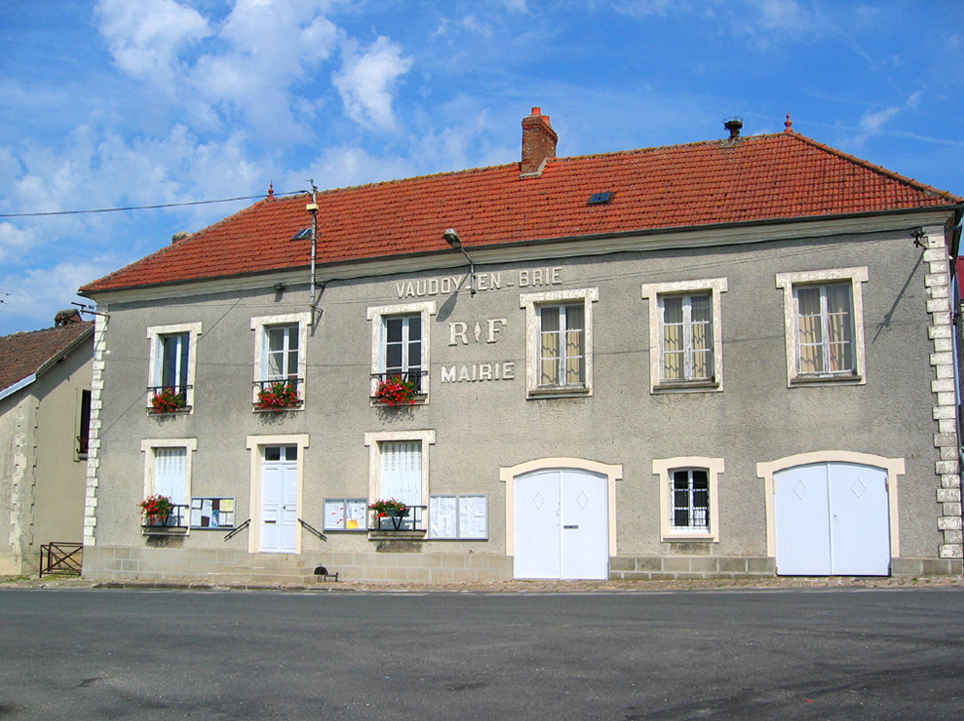
- The town hall in Vaudoy-en-Brie
- Location of Vaudoy-en-Brie
- Location within France Location within Île-de-France (region)
- Coordinates: 48°41′18″N 3°04′53″E
- Country: France
- Region: Île-de-France
- Department: Seine-et-Marne
- Arrondissement: Provins
- Canton: Fontenay-Trésigny
- Intercommunality: CC Val Briard

Government
  - Mayor (2020–2026): Béatrice L'Écuyer
- Area^{1}: 26.98 km^{2} (10.42 sq mi)
- Highest elevation: 137 m (449 ft)
- Lowest elevation: 100 m (330 ft)
- Population (2023): 872
  - Density: 32.3/km^{2} (83.7/sq mi)
- Time zone: UTC+01:00 (CET)
  - Summer (DST): UTC+02:00 (CEST)
- INSEE/Postal code: 77486 /77141
- ^{1} French Land Register data, which excludes lakes, ponds, glaciers > 1 km^{2} (0.386 sq mi or 247 acres) and river estuaries.

Vaudoy-en-Brie (French: [vodwa ɑ̃ bʁi]) is a commune in the Seine-et-Marne department in the Île-de-France region in north-central France. The commune is close to Paris, about an hour's drive south-southeast. Inhabitants of Vaudoy-en-Brie are called Vaudoyens. As of 2023, the population of the commune was 872.

== See also ==
- Communes of the Seine-et-Marne department
