= Châtres, Seine-et-Marne =

Châtres
- Commune
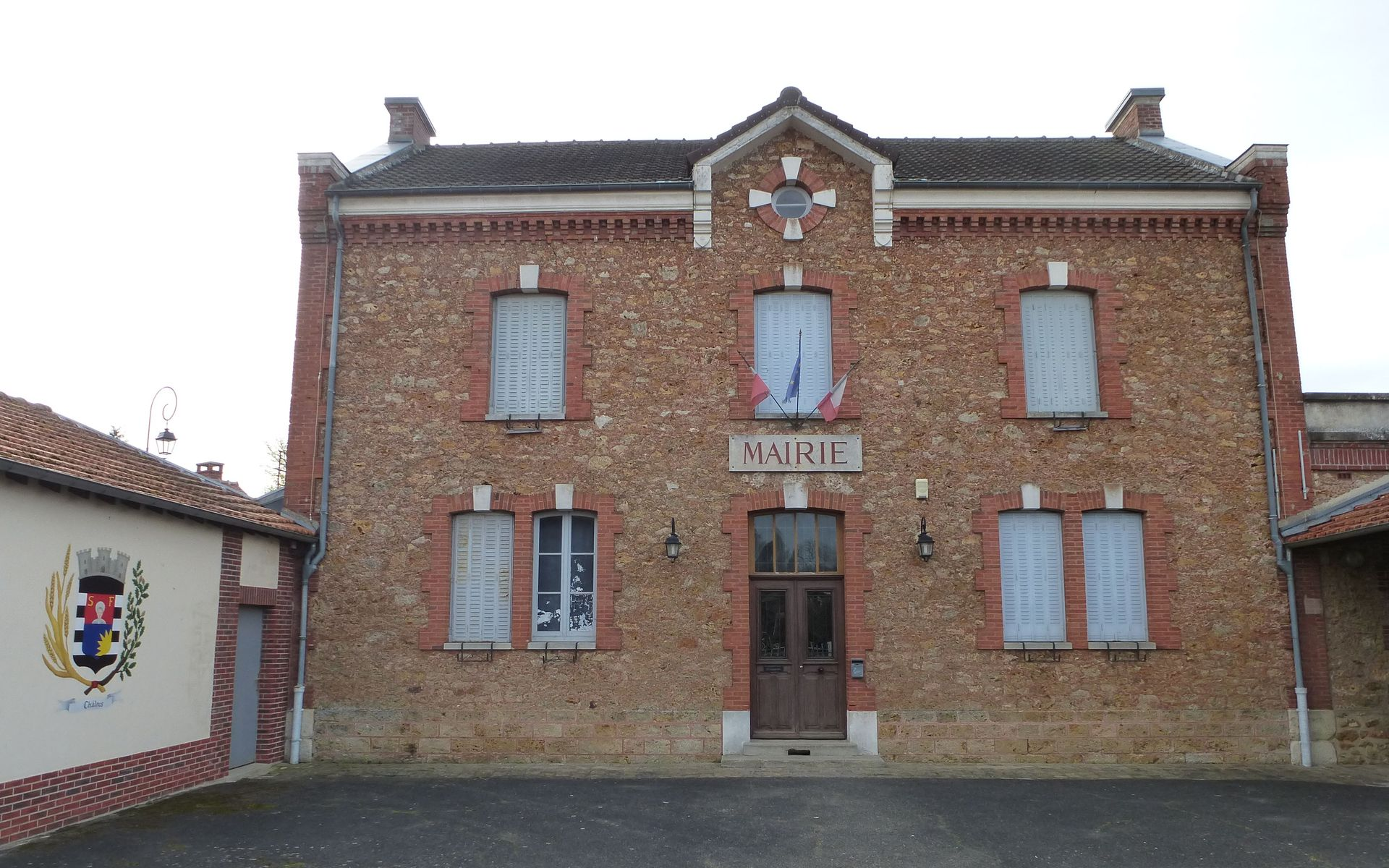
- The town hall in Châtres

- Coat of arms
- Location of Châtres
- Location within France Location within Île-de-France (region)
- Coordinates: 48°42′38″N 2°48′35″E
- Country: France
- Region: Île-de-France
- Department: Seine-et-Marne
- Arrondissement: Provins
- Canton: Fontenay-Trésigny
- Intercommunality: CC Val Briard

Government
  - Mayor (2020–2026): Michel Rollin
- Area^{1}: 15.13 km^{2} (5.84 sq mi)
- Highest elevation: 117 m (384 ft)
- Lowest elevation: 89 m (292 ft)
- Population (2023): 714
  - Density: 47.2/km^{2} (122/sq mi)
- Time zone: UTC+01:00 (CET)
  - Summer (DST): UTC+02:00 (CEST)
- INSEE/Postal code: 77104 /77610
- ^{1} French Land Register data, which excludes lakes, ponds, glaciers > 1 km^{2} (0.386 sq mi or 247 acres) and river estuaries.

Châtres (French pronunciation: [ʃatʁ]) is a commune in the Seine-et-Marne department in the Île-de-France region in north-central France.

== History ==
Châtres began as a Roman camp. Its name, formerly Chastres, is derived from Latin castrum.

Châtres is documented as the place where Saint Corbinian was born circa 670 and where he maintained a hermitage for fourteen years.

== Demographics ==
The inhabitants of Châtres are called Châtriots. As of 2017, its population is 678.

== Places of interest ==
Place of interest include the Château de Boulayes and its park.

== Agriculture ==
The area produces cereal grain.

== See also ==
- Communes of the Seine-et-Marne department
