= Le Plessis-Feu-Aussoux =

- Commune
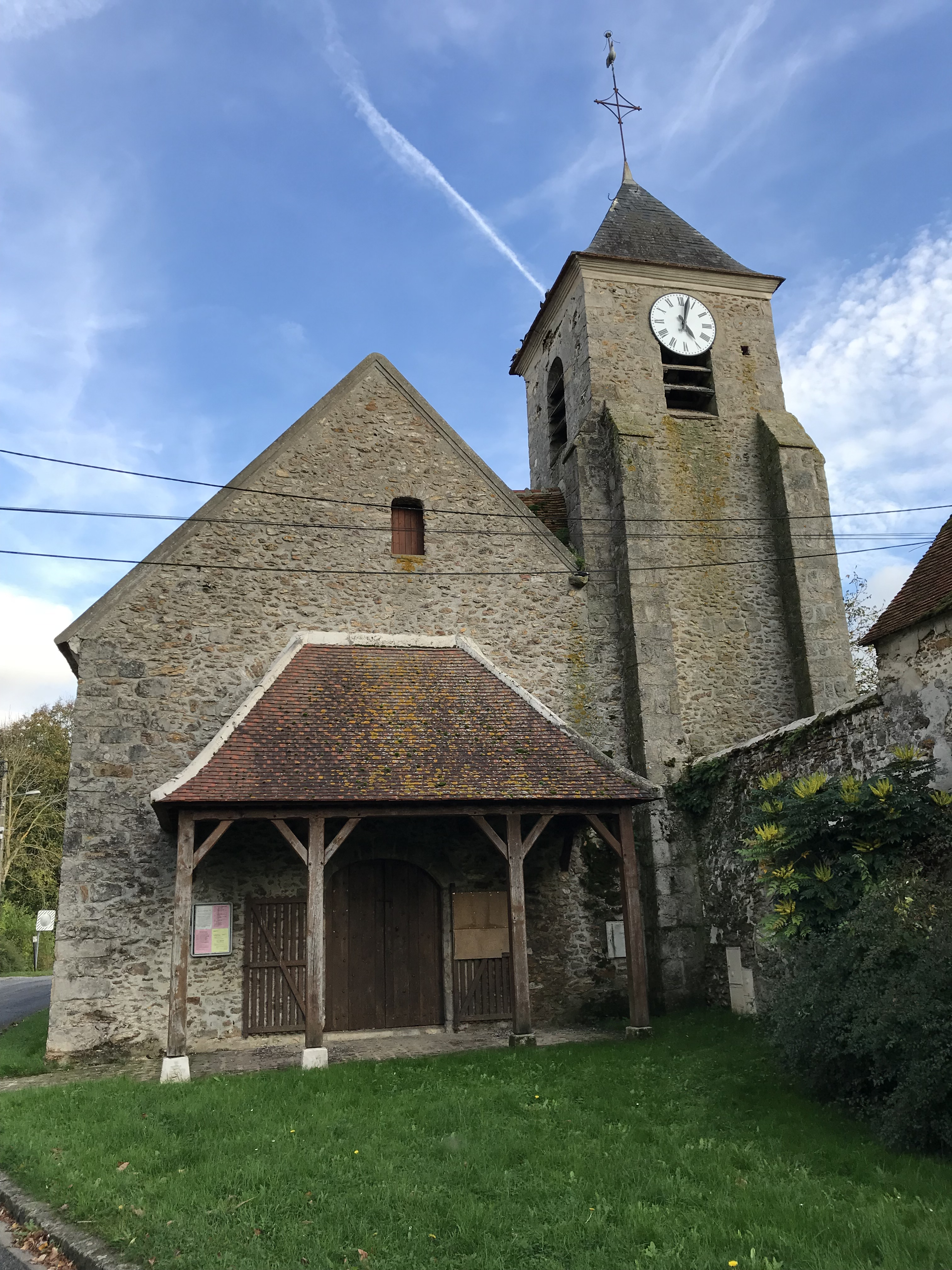
- The church in Le Plessis-Feu-Aussoux
- Location of Le Plessis-Feu-Aussoux
- Location within France Location within Île-de-France (region)
- Coordinates: 48°43′00″N 3°02′00″E
- Country: France
- Region: Île-de-France
- Department: Seine-et-Marne
- Arrondissement: Provins
- Canton: Fontenay-Trésigny
- Intercommunality: CC Val Briard

Government
  - Mayor (2024–2026): Isabelle Perigault
- Area^{1}: 5.59 km^{2} (2.16 sq mi)
- Highest elevation: 126 m (413 ft)
- Lowest elevation: 93 m (305 ft)
- Population (2023): 597
  - Density: 107/km^{2} (277/sq mi)
- Time zone: UTC+01:00 (CET)
  - Summer (DST): UTC+02:00 (CEST)
- INSEE/Postal code: 77365 /77540
- ^{1} French Land Register data, which excludes lakes, ponds, glaciers > 1 km^{2} (0.386 sq mi or 247 acres) and river estuaries.

Le Plessis-Feu-Aussoux (French pronunciation: [lə plɛsi fø osu]) is a commune in the Seine-et-Marne department in the Île-de-France region in north-central France.

== Demographics ==
Inhabitants are called Ansoldiens.

== See also ==
- Communes of the Seine-et-Marne department
