= La Houssaye-en-Brie =

- Commune
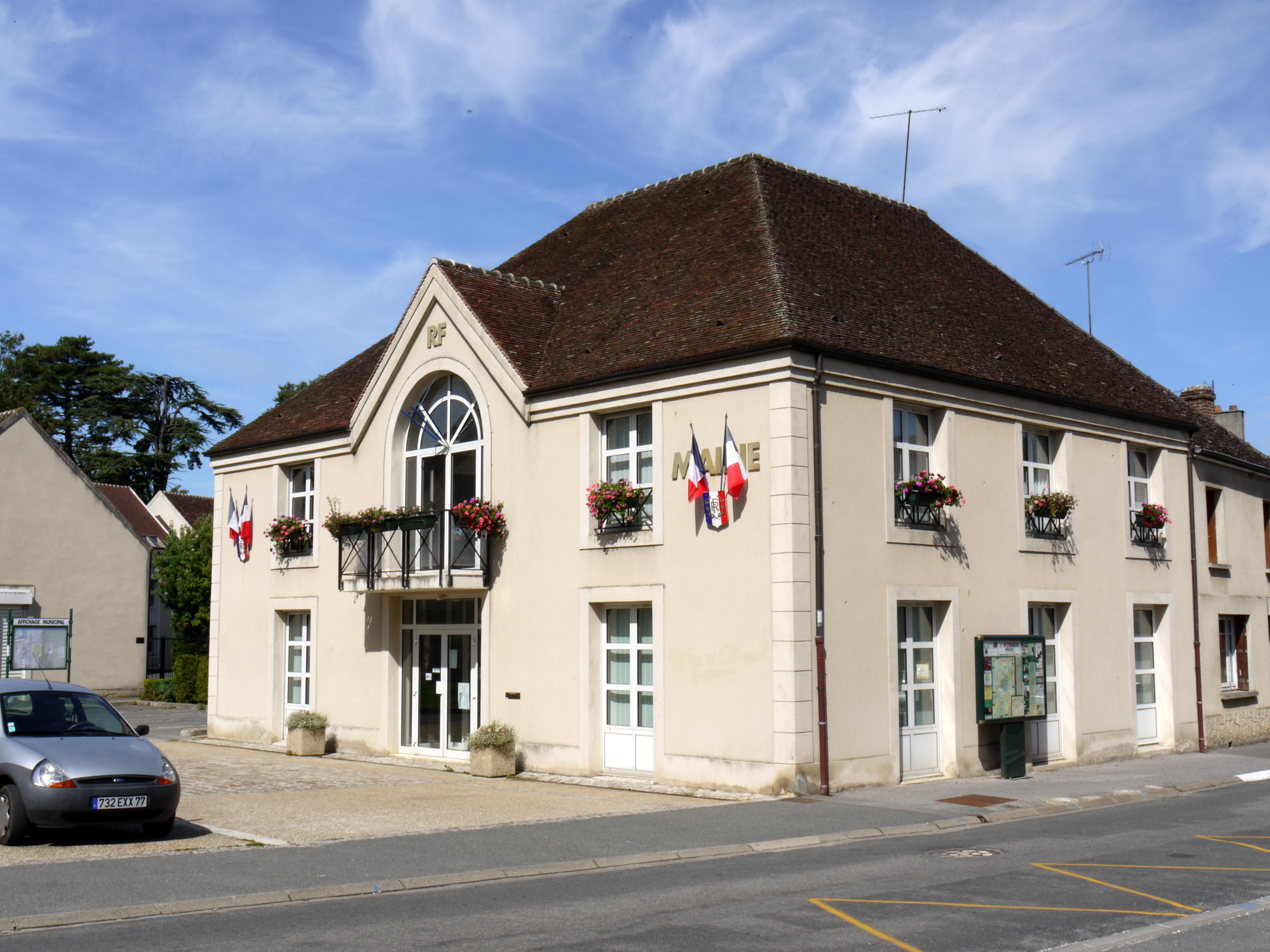
- The town hall in La Houssaye-en-Brie
- Location of La Houssaye-en-Brie
- Location within France Location within Île-de-France (region)
- Coordinates: 48°45′14″N 2°52′27″E
- Country: France
- Region: Île-de-France
- Department: Seine-et-Marne
- Arrondissement: Provins
- Canton: Fontenay-Trésigny
- Intercommunality: CC Val Briard

Government
  - Mayor (2020–2026): Jean Abiteboul
- Area^{1}: 12.43 km^{2} (4.80 sq mi)
- Highest elevation: 121 m (397 ft)
- Lowest elevation: 108 m (354 ft)
- Population (2023): 1,731
  - Density: 139.3/km^{2} (360.7/sq mi)
- Time zone: UTC+01:00 (CET)
  - Summer (DST): UTC+02:00 (CEST)
- INSEE/Postal code: 77229 /77610
- ^{1} French Land Register data, which excludes lakes, ponds, glaciers > 1 km^{2} (0.386 sq mi or 247 acres) and river estuaries.

La Houssaye-en-Brie (French: [la usɛ ɑ̃ bʁi]) is a commune in the Seine-et-Marne department in the Île-de-France region in north-central France.

== Demographics ==
Inhabitants are called Hulsétiens.

== See also ==
- Communes of the Seine-et-Marne department
