= Brie (region) =

Region in northern France

Coordinates: 48°40′N 03°00′E

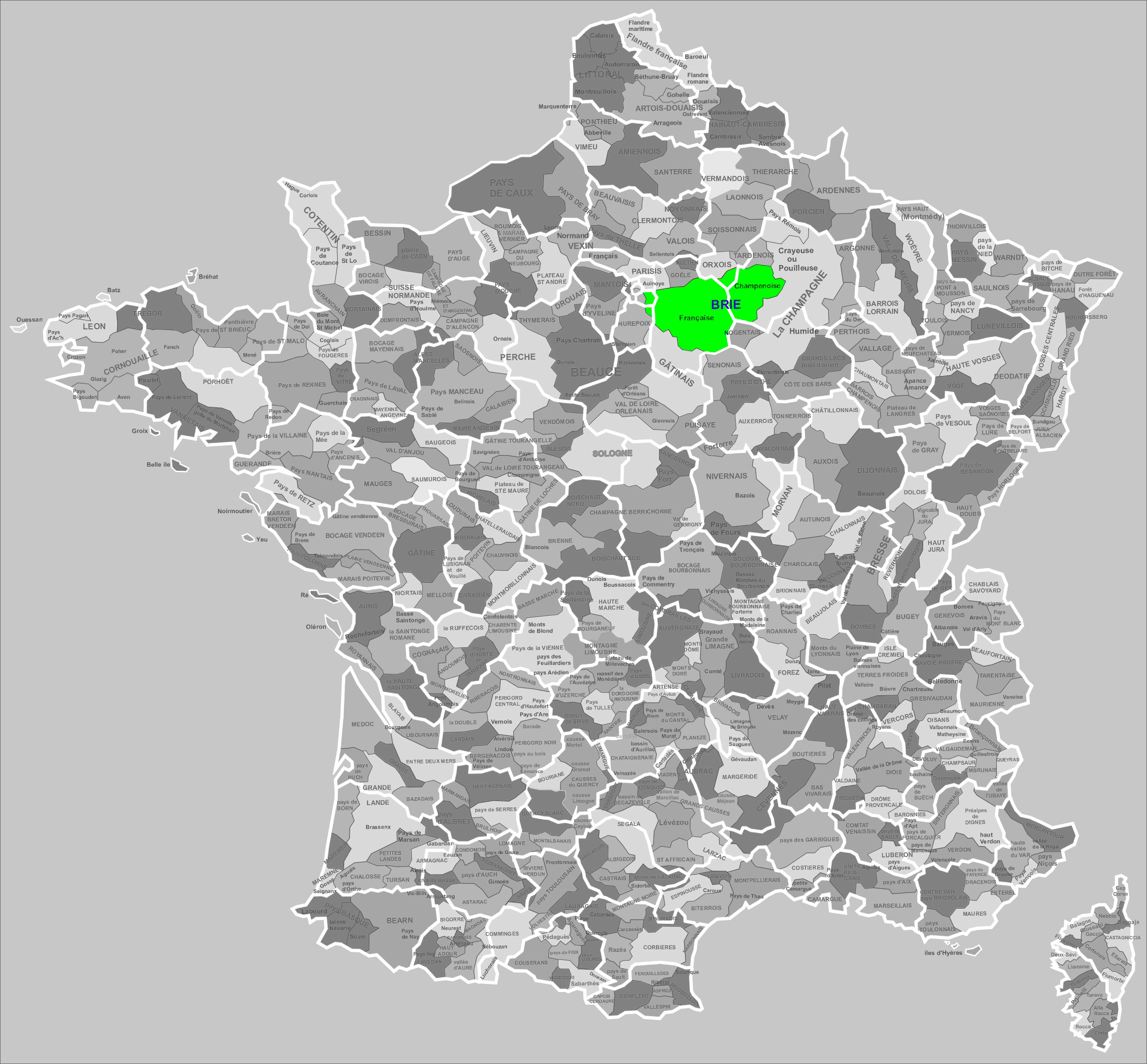
Brie region in France

Brie (/briː/; French pronunciation: [bʁi]) is a historic region of northern France notable in modern times for Brie cheese. It was once divided into three sections ruled by different feudal lords: the western Brie française, corresponding roughly to the modern department of Seine-et-Marne in the Île-de-France region; the eastern Brie champenoise, forming a portion of the modern department of Marne in the historic region of Champagne (part of modern-day Grand Est); and the northern Brie pouilleuse, forming part of the modern department of Aisne in Picardy.

The Brie forms a plateau with few eminences, varying in altitude between roughly 100–150 metres (325–500 ft) in the west, and 150–200 metres (500–650 ft) in the east. Its scenery is varied by forests of some size—the chief being the Forest of Sénart, the Forêt de Crécy-la-Chapelle, and the Forêt d'Armainvilliers. The surface soil is clay in which are embedded fragments of siliceous sandstone, used for millstones and constructional purposes; the subsoil is limestone. The Marne and its tributaries the Grand Morin and the Petit Morin are the chief rivers, but the region is not abundantly watered and the rainfall is only between 50–60 centimetres (20–24 in).

Main towns:

- Brie-Comte-Robert
- Château-Thierry
- Coulommiers
- Crécy-la-Chapelle
- La Ferté-Gaucher
- La Ferté-sous-Jouarre
- Meaux
- Nangis
- Melun
- Provins

Main rivers:

- Marne
- Grand Morin
- Petit Morin

Main forests:

- Forêt d'Armainvilliers
- Forêt de Crécy-la-Chapelle
- Forêt de Ferrières
- Forêt de Notre-Dame
- Forest of Sénart
- Forêt de Villefermoy
