= Pays de Montereau bus network =

Bus network in France

Pays de Montereau
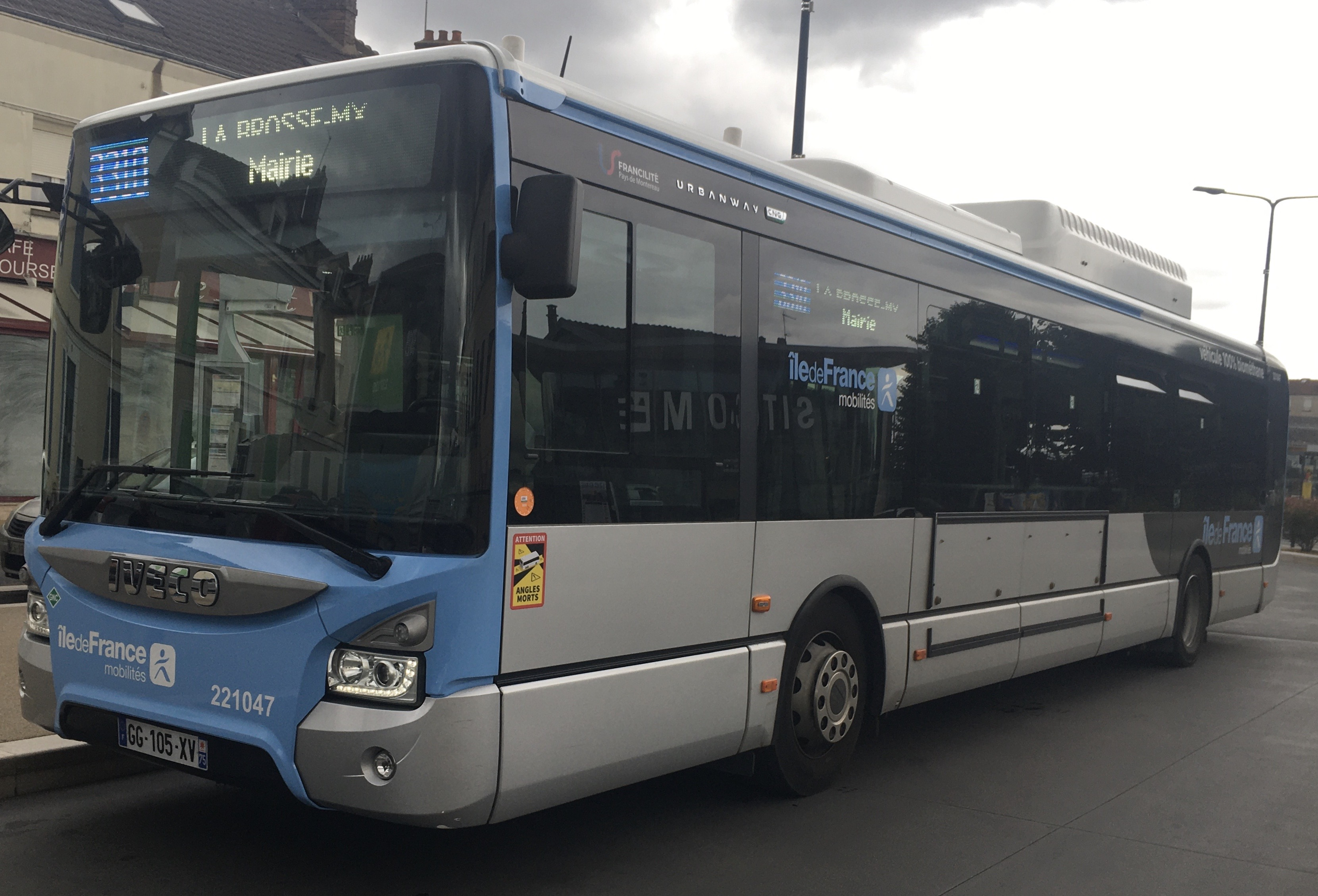
- Iveco Urbanway 12 GNV n°221047 on line 3310 at Montereau station, Montereau-Fault-Yonne.
- Parent: Île-de-France Mobilités
- Founded: August 1, 2023
- Service area: Barbey, Blennes, La Brosse-Montceaux, Cannes-Écluse, Chevry-en-Sereine, Diant, Dormelles, Égreville, Esmans, Flagy, Forges, La Grande-Paroisse, Laval-en-Brie, Lorrez-le-Bocage-Préaux, Marolles-sur-Seine, Misy-sur-Yonne, Montereau-Fault-Yonne, Montmachoux, Noisy-Rudignon, Saint-Ange-le-Viel, Saint-Germain-Laval, Salins, Thoury-Férottes, Varennes-sur-Seine, Vaux-sur-Lunain, Villebéon, Villemaréchal, Ville-Saint-Jacques, Voulx
- Routes: 3301 3302 3303 3304 3305; 3306 3307 3308 3310 3311; 3315 3319 7746
- Operator: CFTR (Francilité Pays de Montereau)
- Website: Pays de Montereau bus network website

Pays de Montereau is a French bus network run by Île-de-France Mobilités, operated by CFTR through his subsidiary Francilité Pays de Montereau. It was created thanks of a merging of SAVAC and Cars Lacroix from August 1, 2023.

The network consists of 15 lines serving the communauté de communes du Pays de Montereau. The network is also completed by a night line and a demand-responsive transport.

== History ==
=== Opening to the competition ===
Due to the opening up of public transport to competition in Île-de-France, Pays de Montereau is founded on August 1, 2023, corresponding to public service delegation number 17 established by Île-de-France Mobilités. A call for tenders was therefore launched by the organizing authority to designate a company that will operate the network for a period of four years. It was finally the CFTR who gain the operation, via his subsidiary Francilité Pays de Montereau, which was designated during the board of directors on December 7, 2022.

At the time of its opening to competition, the network consisted of the line 15 of ProCars, line 46 of Seine-et-Marne Express operated by Transdev Vulaines, lines A, B, C, Ea, Eb, Emplet, F, G, I et L of Siyonne, and line 19 of STILL bus network operated by Transdev Interval.

On September 7, 2023, two night lines were created and serves the Montereau station.

==== Network renaming ====
Since April 29, 2024, the Pays de Montereau network has been implementing the new single regional numbering system planned by Île-de-France Mobilités to eliminate duplication.

The correspondence between the old and new numbers is as follows:

Network renaming
Old	New
A	3301
Emplet	3302
B	3303
C	3304
G	3305
I	3306
F	3307
L	3308
Ea	3310
Eb	3311
15	3315
19	3319
Express 46; Soirée	Unchanged

==== Criticism of the network ====
The network is contested by the mayors of the 21 members of the Sitcome (Syndicat intercommunal des transports collectifs de Montereau et ses environs) due to non-payment of contributions. But also due to lack of parking space near the Montereau train station.

==== Subsequent changes following the restructuring of the network ====
On September 1, 2025, the line 46 (7746) was scheduled to be restructured with a new stop "Surville" replacing "Saint-Nicolas", this announcement sparked controversy of the Sitcome, it will causes a one-kilometer walk for local habitants if the bus stop is replaced. However, thanks to a collaboration of Île-de-France Mobilités and the Sitcome, the bus stop "Saint-Nicolas" is retained.

On January 5, 2026, the night line Soirée Montereau Nord ceased his operations, his services are integrated into the line 3301.

== Routes ==
=== Main routes ===
Image	Line	First direction	Second direction
	3301	Gare de Montereau	Montereau-Fault-Yonne — Pajol; Montereau-Fault-Yonne — Cimetière
	3302	Gare de Montereau	Varennes-sur-Seine — Bréau Centre Commercial
	3303	Varennes-sur-Seine — Maison Rouge	Cannes-Écluse — Saint-Georges
	3304	Gare de Montereau	Saint-Germain-Laval — Nanon
	3305	Gare de Montereau	Gare de La Grande-Paroisse; La Grande-Paroisse — Eglise
	3306	Gare de Montereau	Misy-sur-Yonne — Place des Érables
	3307	Gare de Montereau	Forges — Les Courreaux
	3308	Gare de Montereau	Laval-en-Brie — La Morelle
	3310	Gare de Montereau; Montereau-Fault-Yonne — Lycée André Malraux; Varennes-sur-Seine — Lycée Gustave Eiffel	La Brosse-Montceaux — Mairie
	3311	Gare de Montereau; Montereau-Fault-Yonne — Eglise	Barbey — Château; La Brosse-Montceaux — Mairie; La Brosse-Montceaux — Hameau de Chevinois
	3315	Varennes-sur-Seine — Lycée Gustave Eiffel	Salins — Le Rôty
	3319	Gare de Montereau; Montereau-Fault-Yonne — Place Lepesme; Varennes-sur-Seine — Lycée Gustave Eiffel	Égreville — Place Berne-Bellecourt; Chevry-en-Sereine — Villeflambeau; Voulx — Monument
	7746	Gare de Montereau; Montereau-Fault-Yonne — Place Lepesme; Varennes-sur-Seine — Lycée Gustave Eiffel	Gare de Melun

=== Night routes ===
The network is also completed with one night line named Soirée Montereau Sud.

Image	Line
	Soirée Montereau Sud

=== Demand-responsive transport ===
The network also operates a demand-responsive transport named TàD Montereau.

Image	Line
	TàD Montereau

== See also ==
- Île-de-France Mobilités
