= Canton of Lorrez-le-Bocage-Préaux =

Coordinates: 48°15′35″N 2°55′29″E

Lorrez-le-Bocage-Préaux
- Former canton
- Interactive map of Lorrez-le-Bocage-Préaux
- Country: France
- Region: Île-de-France
- Department: Seine-et-Marne
- No. of communes: {{{nbcomm}}}
- Disbanded: 2015
- Area: 214.06 km^{2} (82.65 sq mi)
- Population (2012): 11,299
  - Density: 52.784/km^{2} (136.71/sq mi)

The canton of Lorrez-le-Bocage-Préaux is a French former administrative division, located in the arrondissement of Fontainebleau, in the Seine-et-Marne département (Île-de-France région). It was disbanded following the French canton reorganisation which came into effect in March 2015. It consisted of 16 communes, which joined the canton of Nemours in 2015.

== Demographics ==
Historical population
Year	Pop.	±%
1999	10,195	—
2006	10,895	+6.9%
2012	11,299	+3.7%

== Composition ==
The canton of Lorrez-le-Bocage-Préaux was composed of 16 communes:

- Blennes
- Chevry-en-Sereine
- Diant
- Égreville
- Flagy
- Lorrez-le-Bocage-Préaux
- Montmachoux
- Noisy-Rudignon
- Paley
- Remauville
- Saint-Ange-le-Viel
- Thoury-Férottes
- Vaux-sur-Lunain
- Villebéon
- Villemaréchal
- Voulx

== See also ==
- Cantons of the Seine-et-Marne department
- Communes of the Seine-et-Marne department
