= Communauté de communes du Bocage Gâtinais =

Coordinates: 48.3164°N 2.8914°E

Bocage Gâtinais
- Former communauté de communes
- Interactive map of Bocage Gâtinais
- Country: France
- Region: Île-de-France
- Department: Seine-et-Marne
- No. of communes: {{{nbcomm}}}
- Established: November 1994
- Disbanded: 2017
- Area: 99 km^{2} (38 sq mi)
- Population (2013): 5,348
  - Density: 54/km^{2} (140/sq mi)

The Communauté de communes du Bocage Gâtinais is a former communauté de communes in the Seine-et-Marne département and in the Île-de-France région of France. It was created in January 2000. It was dissolved in January 2017.

The Communauté de communes comprised the following communes:

- Blennes
- Chevry-en-Sereine
- Diant
- Flagy
- Montmachoux
- Noisy-Rudignon
- Thoury-Férottes
- Voulx

== See also ==
- Communes of the Seine-et-Marne department
