= Saint-Germain-Laval =

Saint-Germain-Laval may refer to the following communes in France:

- Saint-Germain-Laval, Loire, in the Loire département
- Saint-Germain-Laval, Seine-et-Marne, in the Seine-et-Marne département
