= Eustache de Refuge =

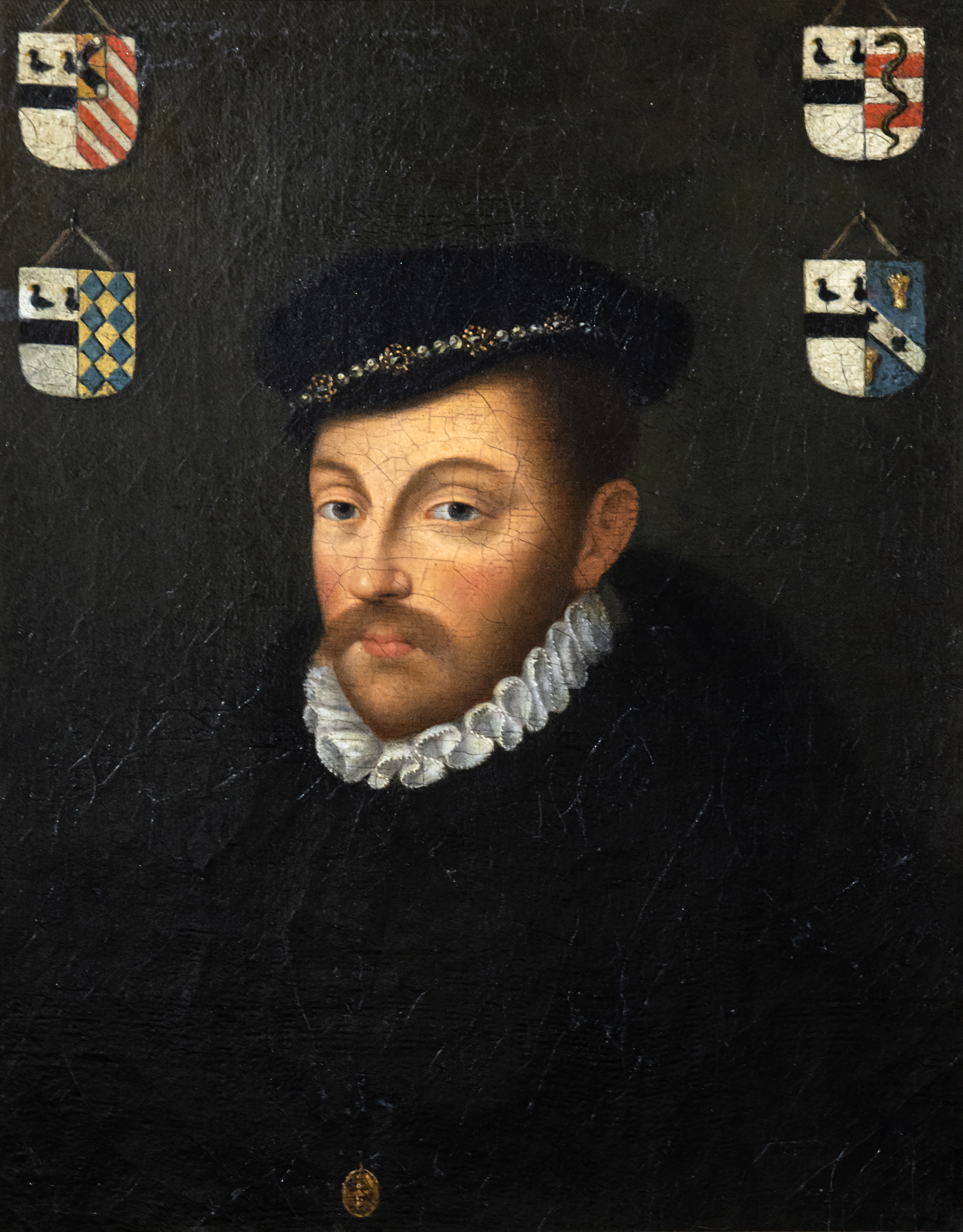
Eustache de Refuge - Musée des Beaux-arts d'Agen

Eustache de Refuge (1564 - September 1617), seigneur de Précy et de Courcelles, was an Early Modern French courtier, statesman and author.

== Biography ==
De Refuge was born into a family of Breton origin that asserted a noble ancestry reaching back to the 14th century. His father was a member of both the Parlement of Brittany and the Parlement of Paris, and his mother and stepmother were both daughters of members of the Parlement of Paris.

He studied law at Bourges and graduated in 1586. In 1592 he acquired a position as a Conseiller of the Parlement of Paris as part of the loyalist majority in Tours.

In 1595, de Refuge married Helène de Bellièvre, the widowed daughter of Pomponne de Bellièvre, a retired diplomat and administrator who had served as the king's representative in Lyon. De Bellièvre was called out of retirement to serve as the Chancellor of France for Henri IV in 1599, a position that he held until his death in 1607. His patronage was therefore of great value to Eustache de Refuge during his career, particularly during his years in Lyon.

In 1597, de Refuge was dispatched by de Bellièvre for two years to report on financial irregularities in Montpellier. On his return, he was sent to Guyenne to see to the implementation of the Edict of Nantes. He was also sent on the king's business to Lyonnais, Dauphiné and Provence. In 1599 he lost out in a competition to become Lieutenant General of Toulouse to a young man "who had the great merit of contributing 7000-8000 écus" to secure it. In 1600, however, he was promoted to Maître des requêtes: an acknowledged stepping-stone to career advancement in the administrative hierarchy.

In 1601 he was again promoted, this time to Intendant at Lyon. His mandate focused primarily on improving local finances, maintaining law and order in the region, and seeing to the application of the Treaty of Lyon between France and Savoy.

De Refuge remained in his position at Lyon until 1607, when he was appointed French ambassador to the thirteen cantons of Switzerland at Solothurn, where he was required to renegotiate the alliance with the cantons, including the provision of mercenary troops for the anticipated war with the House of Austria. De Refuge held this position until 1611, when he was appointed Counsellor of State and dispatched as ambassador to Holland (1611–1613), to Flanders, and back to Holland in 1614. He was then appointed Intendant in the army of the Marshal of Boisdauphin (1615), and in 1616 was made Intendant charged with setting up a Parlement in Béarn.

He lived to see the early career of Armand du Plessis, later Cardinal Richelieu, and died in 1617.

== Works ==
=== Traicté de la cour, ou instruction des courtisans (1616) ===
A popular work in the courtly literature tradition of The Prince and The Courtier, the Treatise on the Court, or Instruction of Courtiers was first published anonymously in Holland in 1616. It consists of two books, the first of which is traditional and general in nature.

De Refuge is best known, however, for the second book of the Treatise, which is an instruction manual for success at court. It is an early example of a complete work on organizational behaviour, with advice that is still taken to be as generally relevant today. It plots every step in a career, and elaborates on how to respond to many specific circumstances.

Extracts from the Treatise on the Court:

- Many good pilots have been lost at sea despite their knowledge and experience of navigation, whereas others less knowledgeable, with neither astrolabe nor compass, have successfully completed many a long and perilous voyage. This doesn't lead us to conclude, though, that we should just throw ourselves to the mercy of the winds without skill, science or compass.
- A courtier must be careful to avoid giving counsel the outcome of which may be doubtful or dangerous. If the project is a success the prince will take the credit, while if it is not the advisor will take the blame.
- Though the desire for vengeance is always very violent, fear will drive an adversary to oppose you with even greater passion. For this reason, it is far harder to divert someone who is driven by fear than someone who is driven by hatred.
- It's a common trick at court to stick your leg out and trip someone so that later you can help them to their feet, and thereby earn their gratitude and bind them to you.
- Avarice is just as odious as cruelty to the common people, but they will endure it longer because of the excuse of public need which is usually used to justify increased taxes and reduced public expenditures.
- Many hold that it's better to be indebted to your leader than to have your leader indebted to you. A prince is better disposed towards those he has helped, and believes have good reason to think well of him, than towards those for whom he's done little or nothing.

Book two of the Treatise was a bestseller for a century after its publication, with over thirty editions in French, English, Italian, German, and Latin.

=== Other works ===
- Géographie historique, universelle et particulière, avec un Traité de la préséance du roy de France contre celuy d'Espagne, par feu M. de Refuge (published 1645), a survey of politics and the geography of the then-known world.
- Traité de la reformation de la justice (c.1615), written in whole or in part by de Refuge, possibly based on a text by Michel de l'Hôpital, who was Chancellor of France from 1560 to 1567, concerning structures and governance.
