= Château de Diant =

Castle in Sein-et-Marne, France

Coordinates: 48°16′45″N 2°59′42″E

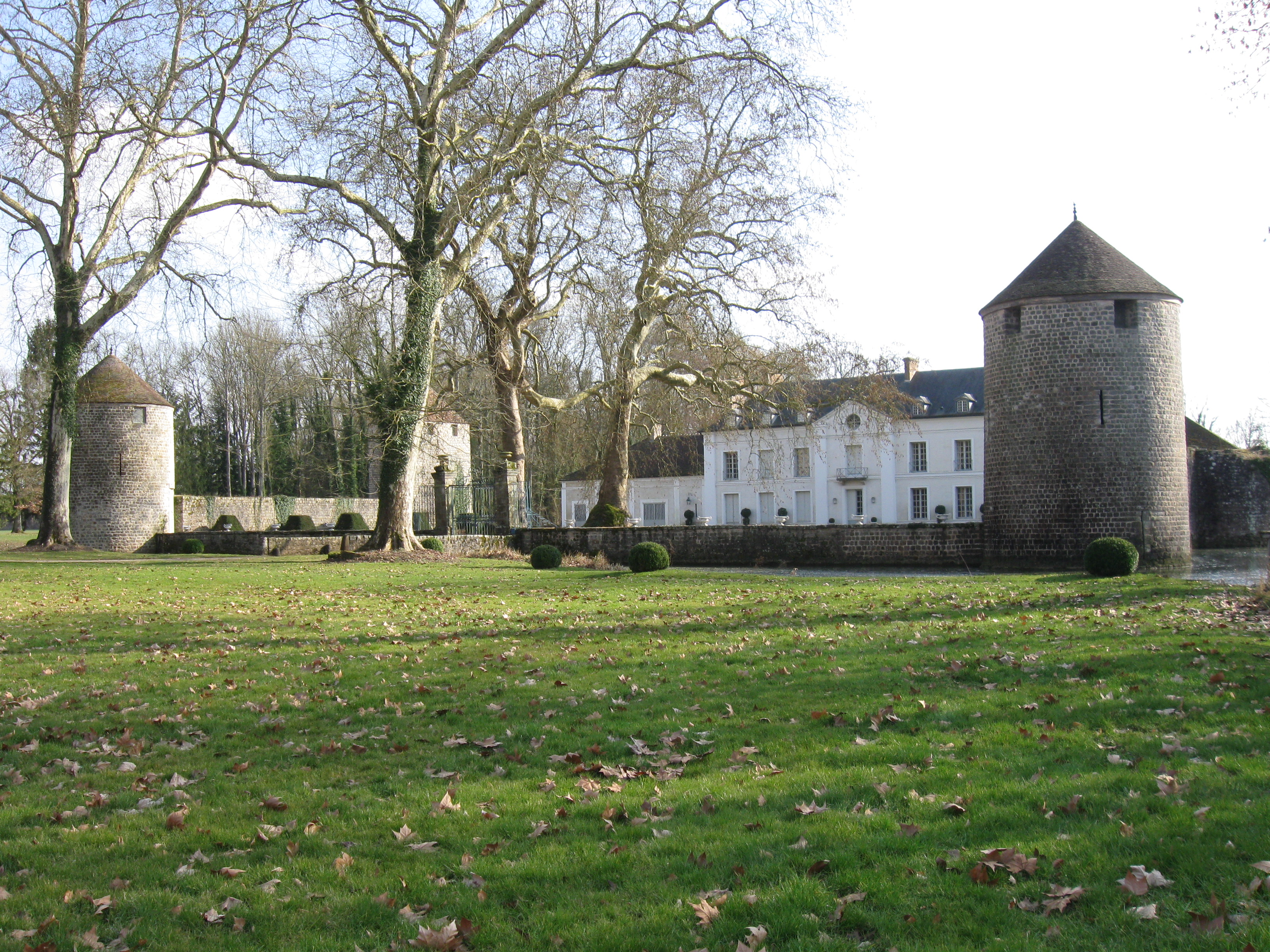
The Feudal manor of Diant

The Château de Diant is a castle in the commune of Diant in the Seine-et-Marne département of France.

The castle was originally constructed in the 13th century for a companion of Philippe Auguste, with additions and modifications in the 15th century and the first half of the 19th.

The castle has been protected since 1946 as a monument historique by the French Ministry of Culture. The gardens are also listed. The castle and gardens are privately owned and not open to the public.

== See also ==
- List of castles in France
