= Canton of Montereau-Fault-Yonne =

Coordinates: 48°23′06″N 2°59′53″E

Montereau-Fault-Yonne
- Canton
- Country: France
- Region: Île-de-France
- Department: Seine-et-Marne
- No. of communes: {{{nbcomm}}}
- Area: 271.94 km^{2} (105.00 sq mi)
- Population (2023): 71,286
  - Density: 262.14/km^{2} (678.94/sq mi)
- INSEE code: 77 13

The canton of Montereau-Fault-Yonne is a French administrative division, located in the arrondissement of Provins, in the Seine-et-Marne département (Île-de-France région). Its population was 69,165 in 2019.

== Composition ==
At the French canton reorganisation which came into effect in March 2015, the canton was expanded from 14 to 25 communes (of which 5 merged into the new commune Moret-Loing-et-Orvanne):

- Barbey
- La Brosse-Montceaux
- Cannes-Écluse
- Champagne-sur-Seine
- Courcelles-en-Bassée
- Esmans
- Forges
- La Grande-Paroisse
- Laval-en-Brie
- Marolles-sur-Seine
- Misy-sur-Yonne
- Montereau-Fault-Yonne
- Moret-Loing-et-Orvanne
- Saint-Germain-Laval
- Saint-Mammès
- Salins
- Thomery
- Varennes-sur-Seine
- Vernou-la-Celle-sur-Seine
- Villecerf
- Ville-Saint-Jacques

== See also ==
- Cantons of the Seine-et-Marne department
- Communes of the Seine-et-Marne department
