= Melun station =

Railway station in Melun, France

Melun
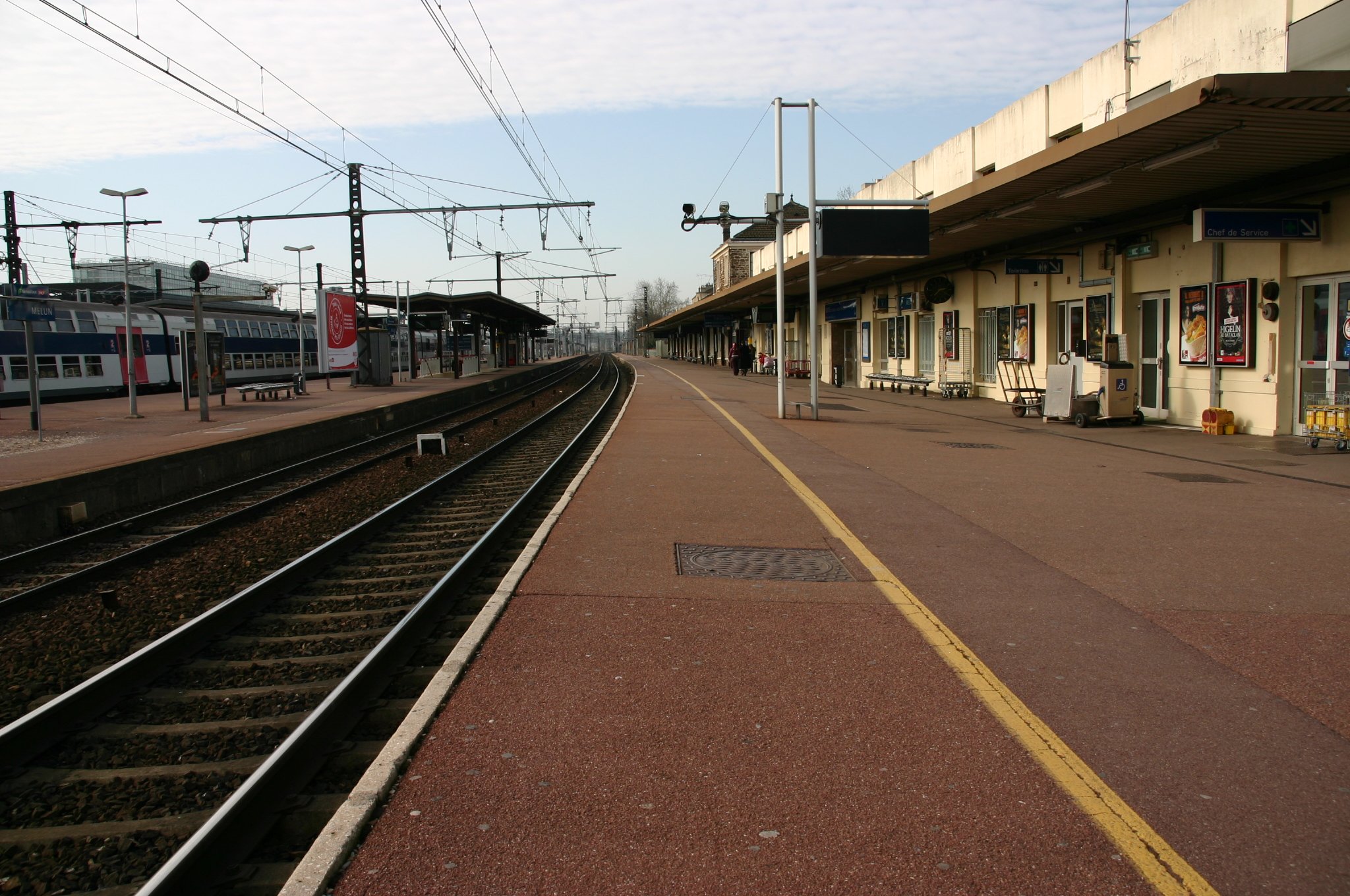
- Melun railway station

General information
- Location: Melun, Seine-et-Marne, Île-de-France, France
- Coordinates: 48°31′38″N 2°39′17″E
- Lines: Paris–Marseille railway Corbeil-Essonnes-Montereau railway RER D Line R
- Platforms: 4
- Tracks: 7 (+ service tracks)
- Connections: Meaux et Ourcq: 7702, 7718; Brie et 2 Morin: 7701; Pays Briard: 3124 3127 3130 3137; Provinois - Brie et Seine: 7704; Pays de Montereau: 7746; Fontainebleau – Moret: 3424 3429 3441; Grand Melun: 3601, 3602, 3603, 3604, 3605, 3606, 3607, 3608 3609, 3610, 3611, 3612, 3613, 3631, 3654, 3655 3658, 3662; Noctilien: N132 N137

Construction
- Accessible: Yes, by prior reservation

Other information
- Station code: 87682005
- Fare zone: 5 (transport fares in the Île-de-France)

History
- Opened: 3 January 1849; 177 years ago

Passengers
- 2024: 17,067,994
Services
Preceding station	Transilien	Following station
Paris-Lyon Terminus	Line R	Bois-le-Roi towards Montargis or Montereau
Terminus	Line R	Livry-sur-Seine towards Montereau
Preceding station	RER	Following station
Le Mée towards Goussainville	RER D	Terminus
Vosves towards Juvisy	RER D	Terminus
Preceding station	Ouigo	Following station
Villeneuve-Saint-Georges towards Paris-Bercy	Train Classique	Dijon-Ville towards Lyon-Perrache
Preceding station	TER Bourgogne-Franche-Comté	Following station
Paris-Lyon Terminus	TER	Bois-le-Roi towards Laroche-Migennes
Location

Melun station (French: Gare de Melun) is a railway station in Melun, Seine-et-Marne, Paris, France. The station was opened on 3 January 1849 and is on the Paris–Marseille railway. The station is served by Paris' express suburban rail system, the RER. The train services are operated by SNCF.

== Train services ==
The station is served by the following service(s):

- Regional services (TER Bourgogne-Franche-Comté) Paris–Montereau–Sens–Laroche-Migennes
- Regional services (Transilien) Paris–Melun–Moret–Nemours–Montargis
- Regional services (Transilien) Paris–Melun–Moret–Montereau
- Regional services (Transilien) Melun–Champagne-sur-Seine–Montereau
- intercity services (Ouigo) Paris - Dijon - Lyon
- Local services (RER D) Goussainville–St Denis–Paris–Villeneuve St Georges–Combs la Ville–Melun
- Local services (RER D) Gare de Lyon–Juvisy–Grigny–Corbeil–Melun
- Local services (RER D) Juvisy–Évry–Corbeil–Melun
