= Communauté de communes du Pays de Montereau =

Federation of municipalities in France

Coordinates: 48.39°N 2.96°E

Pays de Montereau
- Communauté de communes
- Country: France
- Region: Île-de-France
- Department: Seine-et-Marne
- No. of communes: 21
- Established: 1974

Government
  - President: Jean-Marie Albouy-Guidicelli
- Area: 272.93 km^{2} (105.38 sq mi)
- Population (2018): 43,461
  - Density: 159.24/km^{2} (412.43/sq mi)
- Website: www.paysdemontereau.fr

The Communauté de communes du Pays de Montereau (before 2017: Communauté de communes des Deux Fleuves) is a federation of municipalities (communauté de communes) in the Seine-et-Marne département and in the Île-de-France région of France. On 1 January 2017 it was expanded with 7 communes from the former Communauté de communes du Bocage Gâtinais, and its name was changed from Communauté de communes des Deux Fleuves to Communauté de communes du Pays de Montereau. Established on 23 April 1974, its seat is Montereau-Fault-Yonne. Its area is 272.9 km^{2}, and its population was 43,461 in 2018, of which 20,712 in Montereau-Fault-Yonne.

== Composition ==
The communauté de communes consists of the following 21 communes:

1. Barbey
2. Blennes
3. La Brosse-Montceaux
4. Cannes-Écluse
5. Chevry-en-Sereine
6. Courcelles-en-Bassée
7. Diant
8. Esmans
9. Forges
10. La Grande-Paroisse
11. Laval-en-Brie
12. Marolles-sur-Seine
13. Misy-sur-Yonne
14. Montereau-Fault-Yonne
15. Montmachoux
16. Noisy-Rudignon
17. Saint-Germain-Laval
18. Salins
19. Thoury-Férottes
20. Varennes-sur-Seine
21. Voulx

== See also ==
- Communes of the Seine-et-Marne department
