= Montereau station =

Railway station in Montereau-Fault-Yonne, France

Montereau
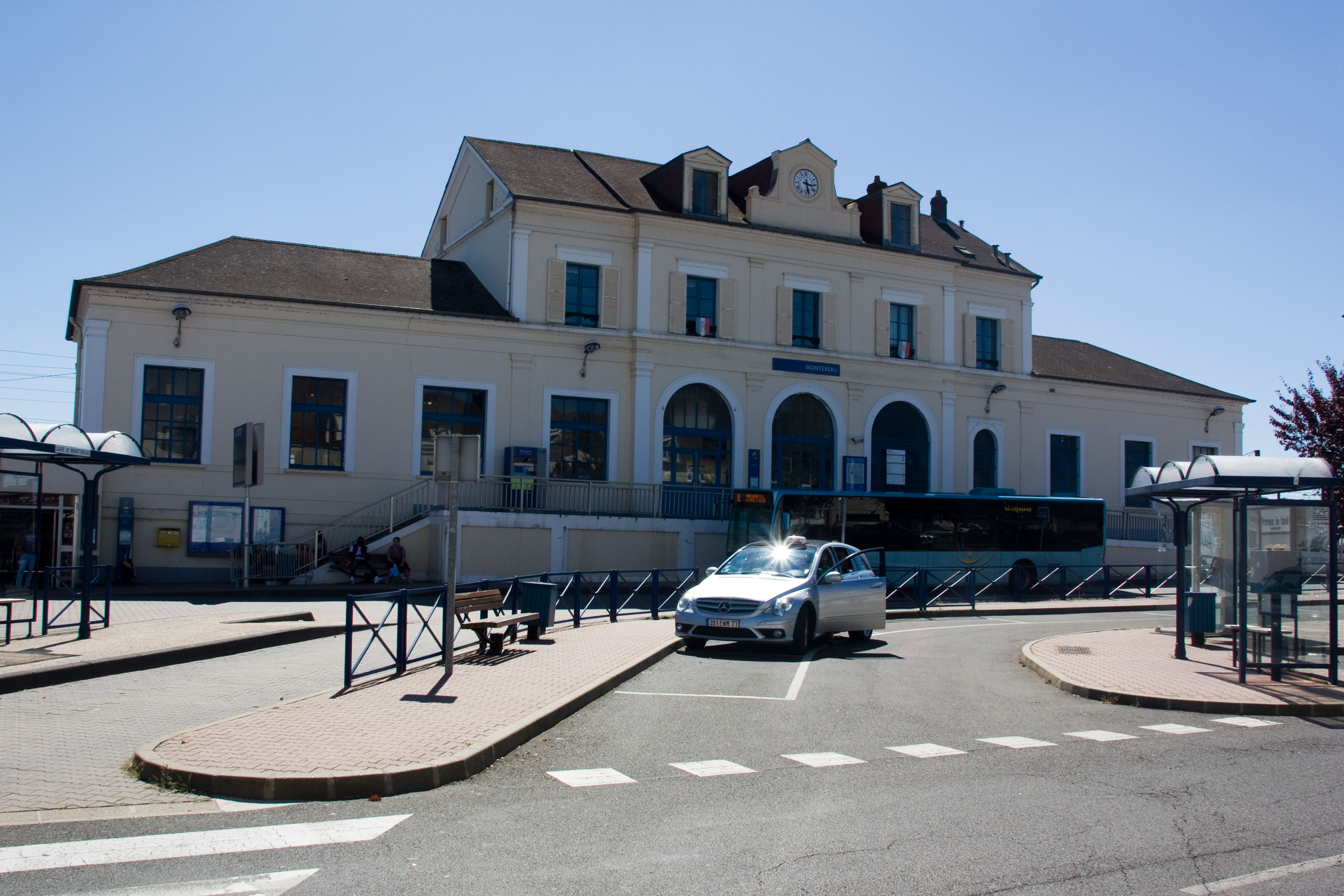
- Montereau station

General information
- Location: Place Pierre-Semard; 77130 Montereau-Fault-Yonne; France
- Coordinates: 48°22′46″N 2°56′35″E
- Owner: SNCF
- Operator: SNCF
- Lines: Paris–Marseille railway Corbeil Essonnes–Montereau railway Flamboin-Gouaix–Montereau railway
- Platforms: 5
- Tracks: 6

Other information
- Station code: 87682302
- Fare zone: 5

History
- Opened: 12 August 1849; 177 years ago

Passengers
- 2024: 3,287,708

Services
| Preceding station | Transilien | Following station |
|---|---|---|
| Saint-Mammès towards Paris-Lyon | Line R | Terminus |
| La Grande-Paroisse towards Melun | Line R | Terminus |
| Preceding station | TER Bourgogne-Franche-Comté | Following station |
| Saint-Mammès towards Paris-Lyon | TER | Villeneuve-la-Guyard towards Laroche-Migennes |
| Paris-Bercy Terminus | TER | Villeneuve-la-Guyard towards Avallon |
Location

Montereau is a railway station serving Montereau-Fault-Yonne, Seine-et-Marne department, northern France. It is on the Paris–Marseille railway.

== Bus connections ==
- Provinois - Brie et Seine: 3202 3210 3250 3260 7707
- Pays de Montereau: 3301 3302 3303 3304 3305 3306 3307 3308 3310 3311 3315 3319 7746
- Fontainebleau – Moret: 3438 3441
- Vallée du Loing - Nemours : 3544, 3546, 3547
- Noctilien: N137
