= Ville-Saint-Jacques =

- Commune
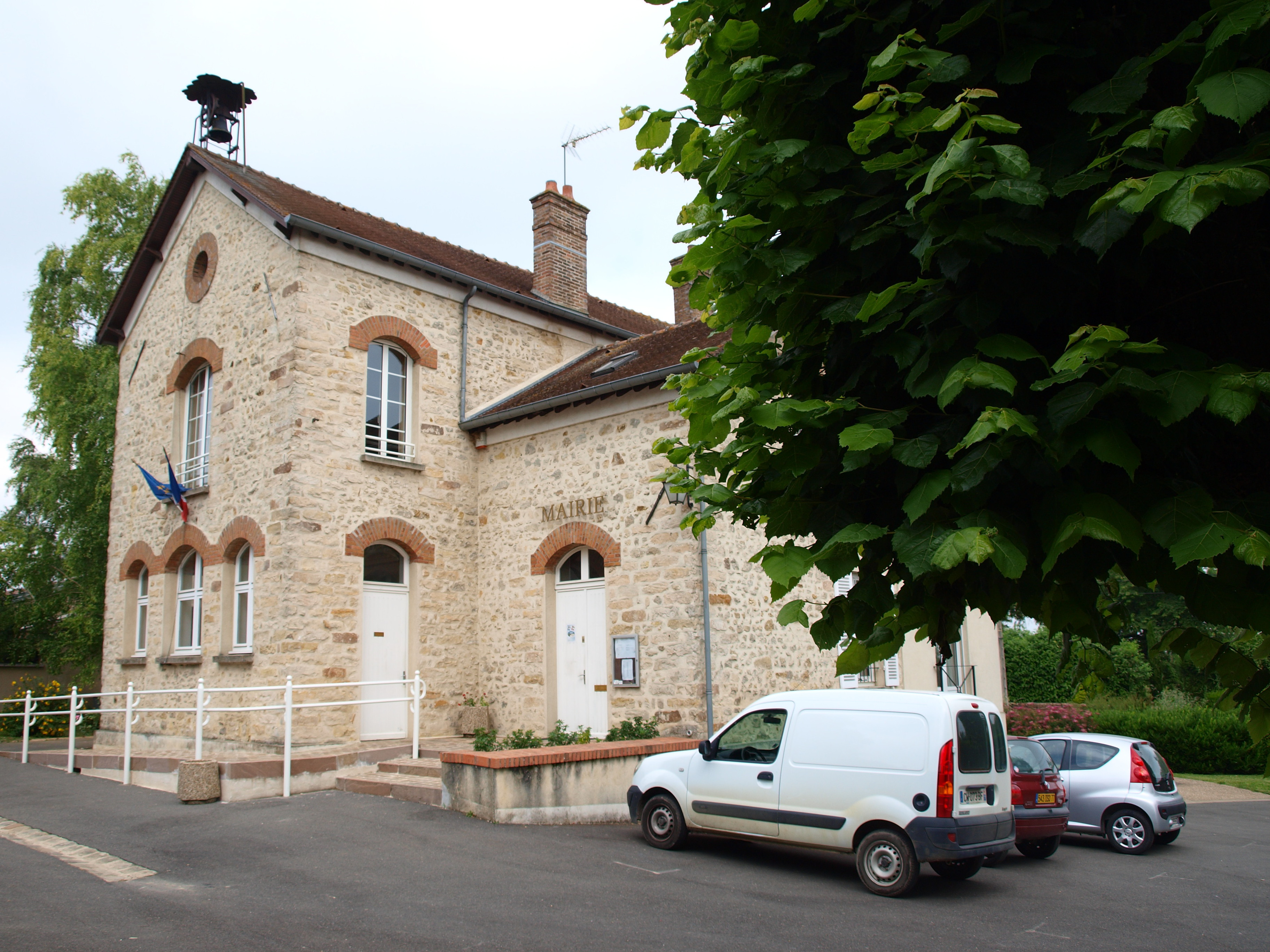
- The town hall in Ville-Saint-Jacques
- Location of Ville-Saint-Jacques
- Location within France Location within Île-de-France (region)
- Coordinates: 48°20′38″N 2°53′57″E
- Country: France
- Region: Île-de-France
- Department: Seine-et-Marne
- Arrondissement: Fontainebleau
- Canton: Montereau-Fault-Yonne
- Intercommunality: Moret Seine et Loing

Government
  - Mayor (2023–2026): Philippe Peradon
- Area^{1}: 10.74 km^{2} (4.15 sq mi)
- Highest elevation: 118 m (387 ft)
- Lowest elevation: 48 m (157 ft)
- Population (2023): 815
  - Density: 75.9/km^{2} (197/sq mi)
- Time zone: UTC+01:00 (CET)
  - Summer (DST): UTC+02:00 (CEST)
- INSEE/Postal code: 77516 /77130
- ^{1} French Land Register data, which excludes lakes, ponds, glaciers > 1 km^{2} (0.386 sq mi or 247 acres) and river estuaries.

Ville-Saint-Jacques (French pronunciation: [vil sɛ̃ ʒak]) is a commune in the Seine-et-Marne department in the Île-de-France region in north-central France.

== Demographics ==
Inhabitants of Ville-Saint-Jacques are called Saint-Jacquevillois.

== See also ==
- Communes of the Seine-et-Marne department
