= La Grande-Paroisse =

- Commune
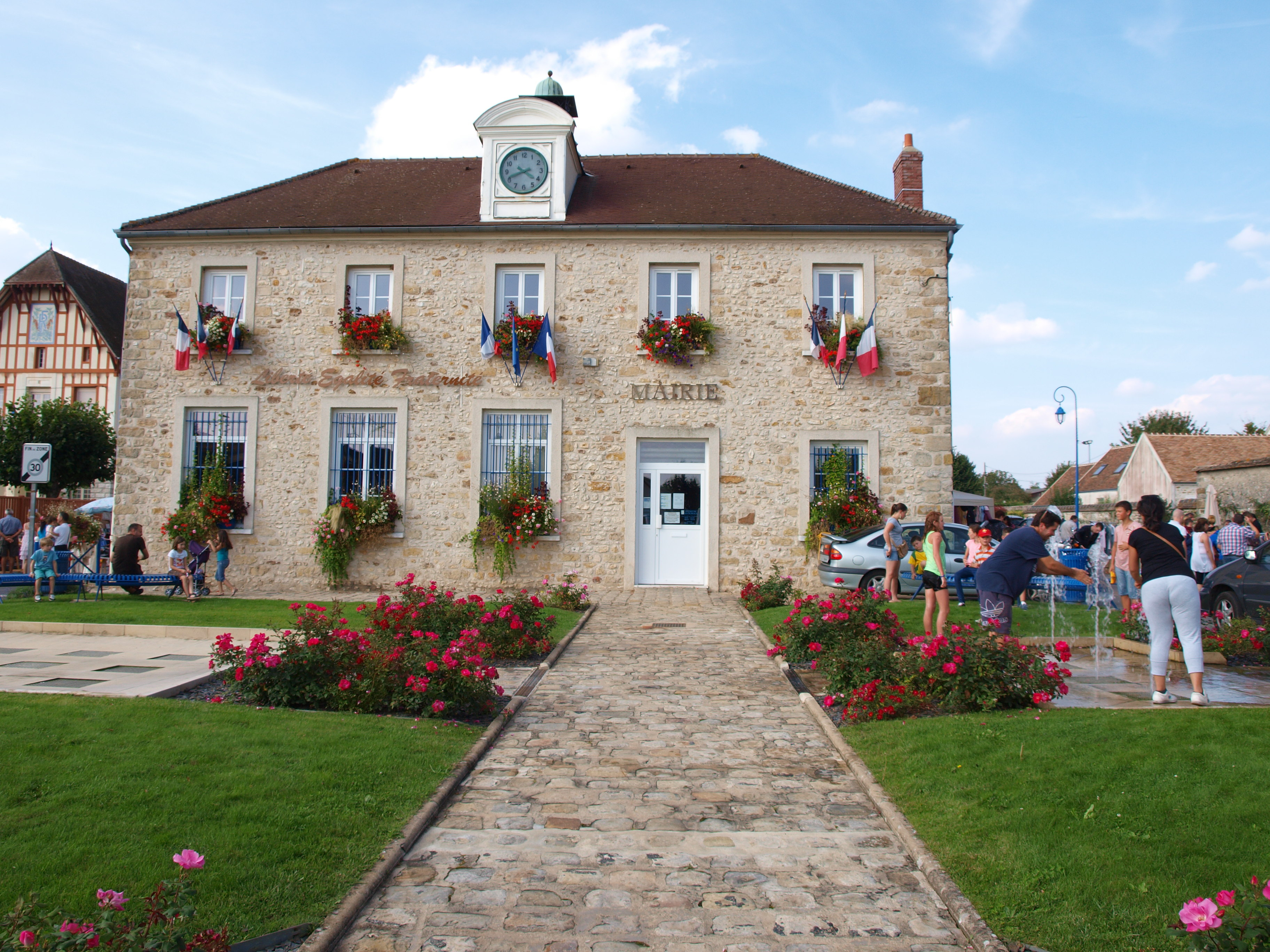
- The town hall in La Grande-Paroisse

- Coat of arms
- Location of La Grande-Paroisse
- Location within France Location within Île-de-France (region)
- Coordinates: 48°23′N 2°55′E
- Country: France
- Region: Île-de-France
- Department: Seine-et-Marne
- Arrondissement: Provins
- Canton: Montereau-Fault-Yonne
- Intercommunality: CC Pays de Montereau

Government
  - Mayor (2020–2026): Emmanuel Ledoux
- Area^{1}: 29.6 km^{2} (11.4 sq mi)
- Highest elevation: 147 m (482 ft)
- Lowest elevation: 45 m (148 ft)
- Population (2023): 2,893
  - Density: 97.7/km^{2} (253/sq mi)
- Time zone: UTC+01:00 (CET)
  - Summer (DST): UTC+02:00 (CEST)
- INSEE/Postal code: 77210 /77130
- ^{1} French Land Register data, which excludes lakes, ponds, glaciers > 1 km^{2} (0.386 sq mi or 247 acres) and river estuaries.

La Grande-Paroisse (French pronunciation: [la ɡʁɑ̃d paʁwas], literally The Great Parish) is a commune in the Seine-et-Marne department in the Île-de-France region in north-central France. The chemical company Grande Paroisse took its name from this commune, where its first factory was established.

== Population ==
Historical population
Year	Pop.	±% p.a.
1968	1,572	—
1975	1,950	+3.13%
1982	2,219	+1.86%
1990	2,392	+0.94%
1999	2,491	+0.45%
2007	2,532	+0.20%
2012	2,652	+0.93%
2017	2,786	+0.99%
2023	2,893	+0.63%
Source: INSEE

Inhabitants are called Grands-Paroissiens in French.

== See also ==
- Communes of the Seine-et-Marne department
