= Cannes-Écluse =

- Commune
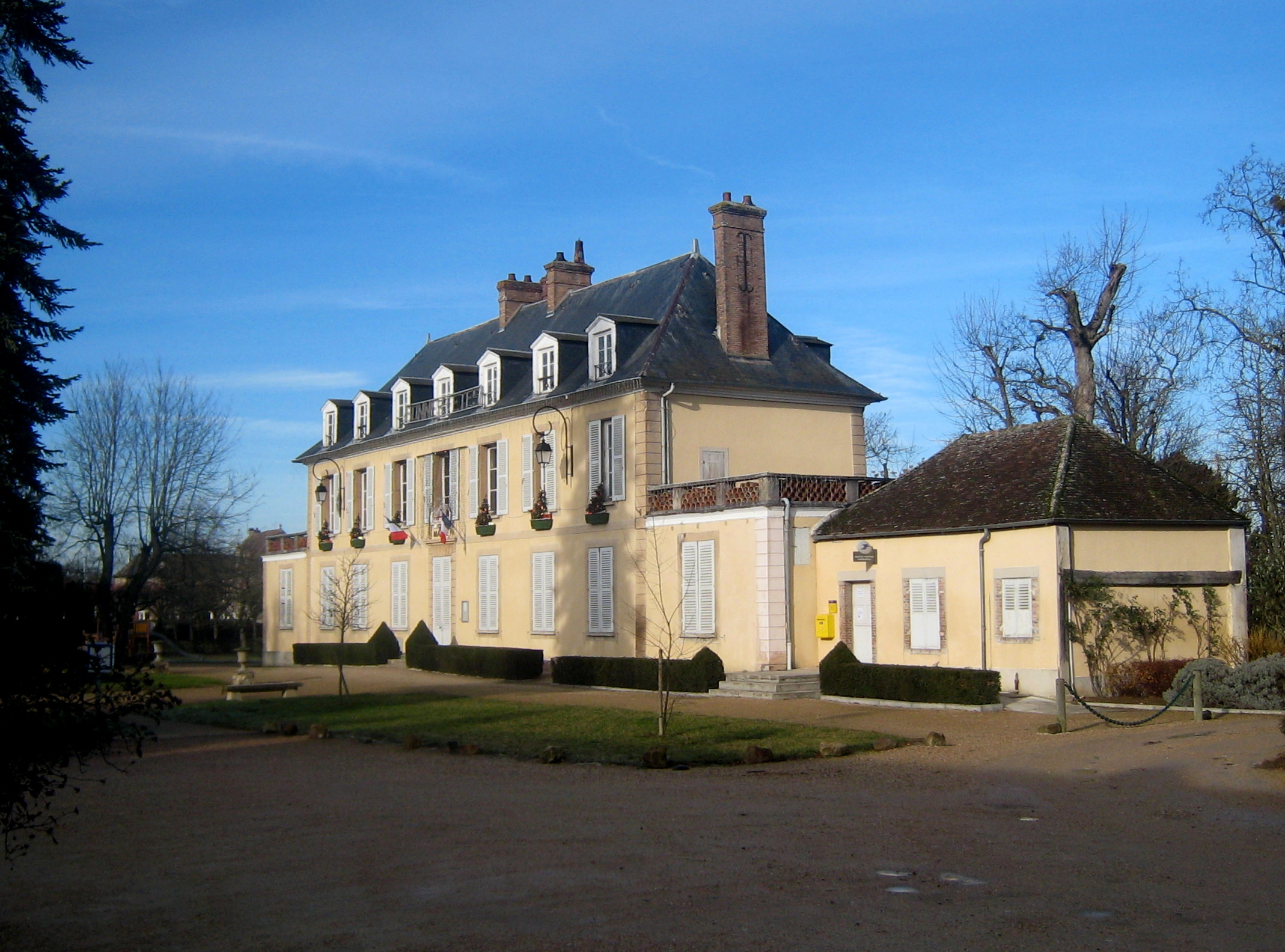
- The town hall in Cannes-Écluse

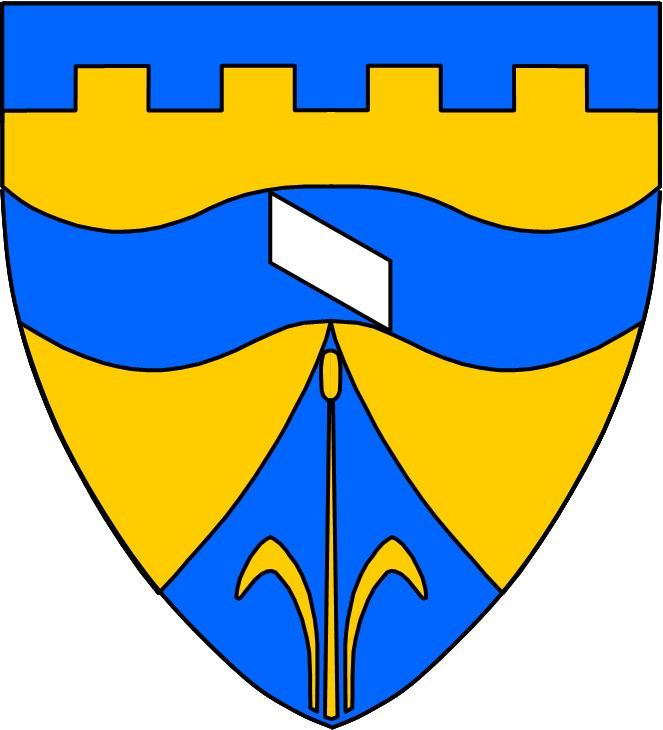
- Coat of arms
- Location of Cannes-Écluse
- Location within France Location within Île-de-France (region)
- Coordinates: 48°21′49″N 2°59′08″E
- Country: France
- Region: Île-de-France
- Department: Seine-et-Marne
- Arrondissement: Provins
- Canton: Montereau-Fault-Yonne
- Intercommunality: CC Pays de Montereau

Government
  - Mayor (2020–2026): Denis Miguet
- Area^{1}: 8.73 km^{2} (3.37 sq mi)
- Highest elevation: 108 m (354 ft)
- Lowest elevation: 47 m (154 ft)
- Population (2023): 2,742
  - Density: 314/km^{2} (813/sq mi)
- Time zone: UTC+01:00 (CET)
  - Summer (DST): UTC+02:00 (CEST)
- INSEE/Postal code: 77061 /77130
- ^{1} French Land Register data, which excludes lakes, ponds, glaciers > 1 km^{2} (0.386 sq mi or 247 acres) and river estuaries.

Cannes-Écluse (French pronunciation: [kan eklyz]) is a commune in the Seine-et-Marne department in the Île-de-France region in north-central France.

== Population ==
Historical population
Year	Pop.	±% p.a.
1968	1,140	—
1975	1,533	+4.32%
1982	1,784	+2.19%
1990	1,963	+1.20%
1999	2,200	+1.27%
2007	2,603	+2.12%
2012	2,550	−0.41%
2017	2,466	−0.67%
2023	2,742	+1.78%
Source: INSEE

The inhabitants are called Cannois in French.

== See also ==
- Communes of the Seine-et-Marne department
