= Salins, Seine-et-Marne =

Salins
- Commune
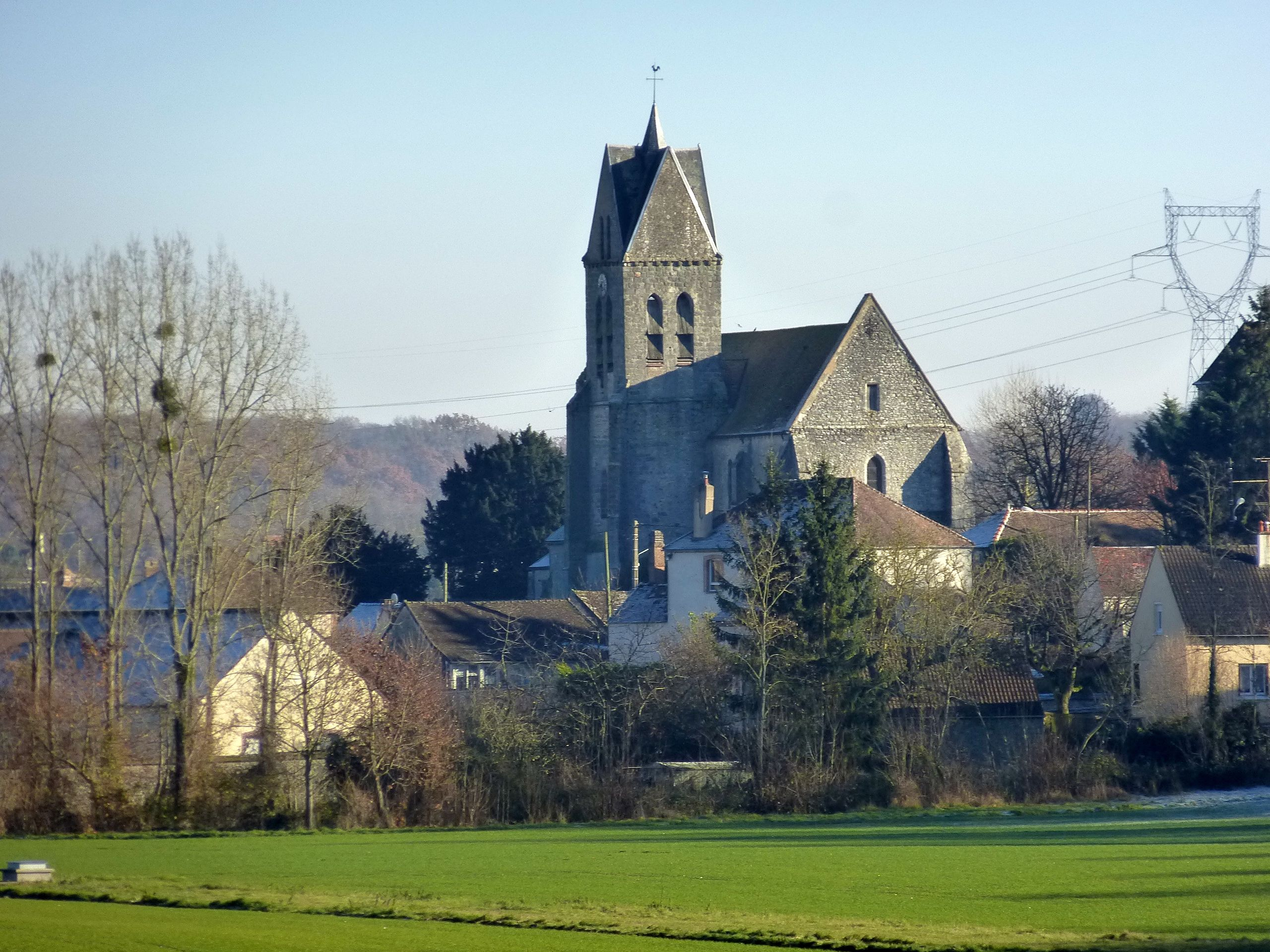
- The church in Salins

- Coat of arms
- Location of Salins
- Location within France Location within Île-de-France (region)
- Coordinates: 48°25′14″N 3°01′19″E
- Country: France
- Region: Île-de-France
- Department: Seine-et-Marne
- Arrondissement: Provins
- Canton: Montereau-Fault-Yonne
- Intercommunality: CC Pays de Montereau

Government
  - Mayor (2020–2026): Georges Benard
- Area^{1}: 10.55 km^{2} (4.07 sq mi)
- Highest elevation: 138 m (453 ft)
- Lowest elevation: 58 m (190 ft)
- Population (2023): 1,165
  - Density: 110.4/km^{2} (286.0/sq mi)
- Time zone: UTC+01:00 (CET)
  - Summer (DST): UTC+02:00 (CEST)
- INSEE/Postal code: 77439 /77148
- ^{1} French Land Register data, which excludes lakes, ponds, glaciers > 1 km^{2} (0.386 sq mi or 247 acres) and river estuaries.

Salins (French pronunciation: [salɛ̃]) is a commune in the Seine-et-Marne department in the Île-de-France region in north-central France. The 18th-century French playwright Charles-Georges Fenouillot de Falbaire de Quingey (1727–1800) was born in Salins.

== Demographics ==
Inhabitants of Salins are called Salinois.

== See also ==
- Communes of the Seine-et-Marne department
