= Misy-sur-Yonne =

- Commune
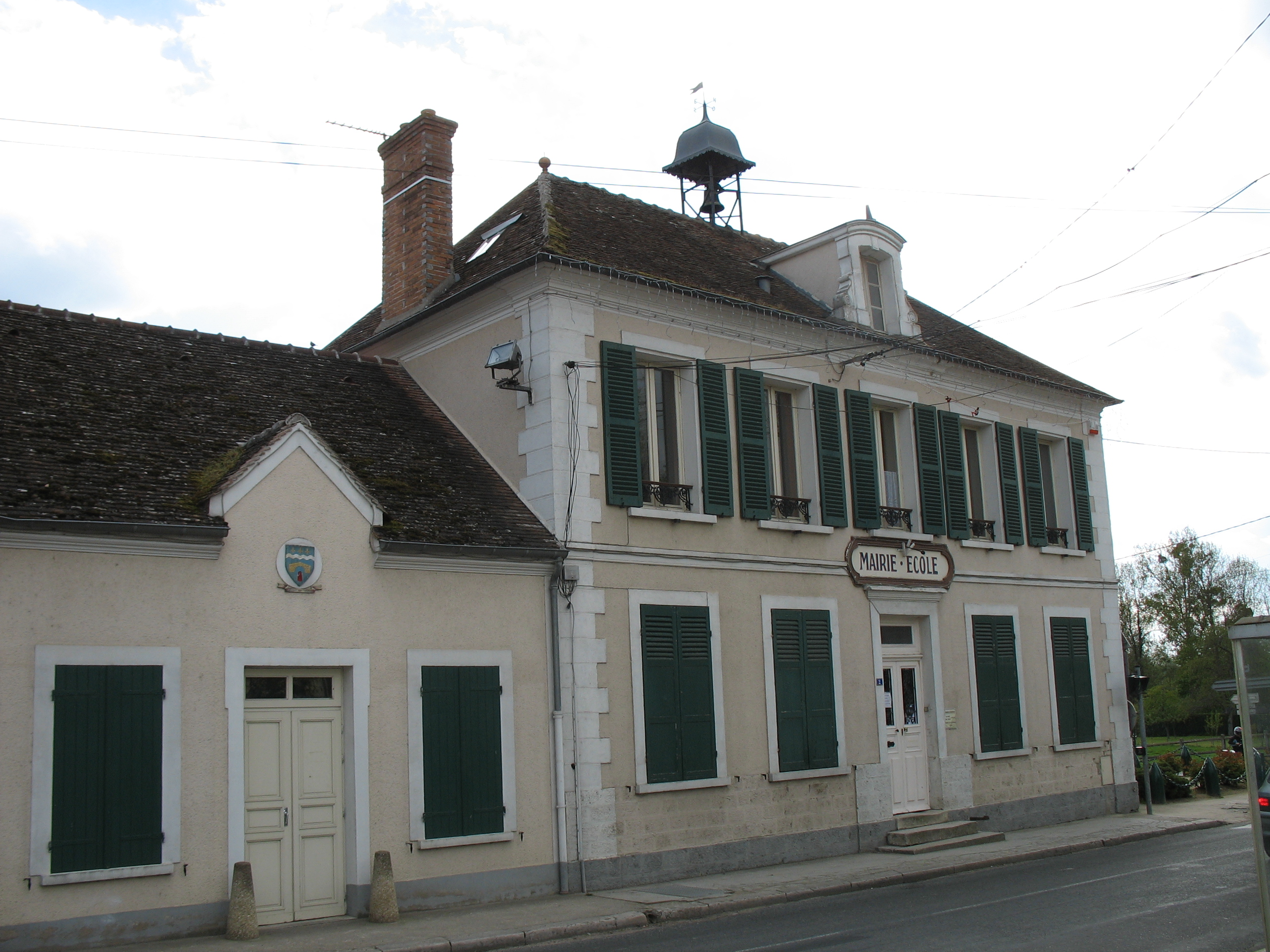
- The town hall in Misy-sur-Yonne

- Coat of arms
- Location of Misy-sur-Yonne
- Location within France Location within Île-de-France (region)
- Coordinates: 48°21′36″N 3°05′31″E
- Country: France
- Region: Île-de-France
- Department: Seine-et-Marne
- Arrondissement: Provins
- Canton: Montereau-Fault-Yonne
- Intercommunality: CC Pays de Montereau

Government
  - Mayor (2020–2026): Monique Jacquier
- Area^{1}: 6.25 km^{2} (2.41 sq mi)
- Highest elevation: 104 m (341 ft)
- Lowest elevation: 53 m (174 ft)
- Population (2023): 834
  - Density: 133/km^{2} (346/sq mi)
- Time zone: UTC+01:00 (CET)
  - Summer (DST): UTC+02:00 (CEST)
- INSEE/Postal code: 77293 /77130
- ^{1} French Land Register data, which excludes lakes, ponds, glaciers > 1 km^{2} (0.386 sq mi or 247 acres) and river estuaries.

Misy-sur-Yonne (French pronunciation: [mizi syʁ jɔn], literally Misy on Yonne) is a commune in the Seine-et-Marne department in the Île-de-France region in north-central France.

== Demographics ==
Inhabitants are called Misyciens.

== See also ==
- Communes of the Seine-et-Marne department
