= Marolles-sur-Seine =

- Commune
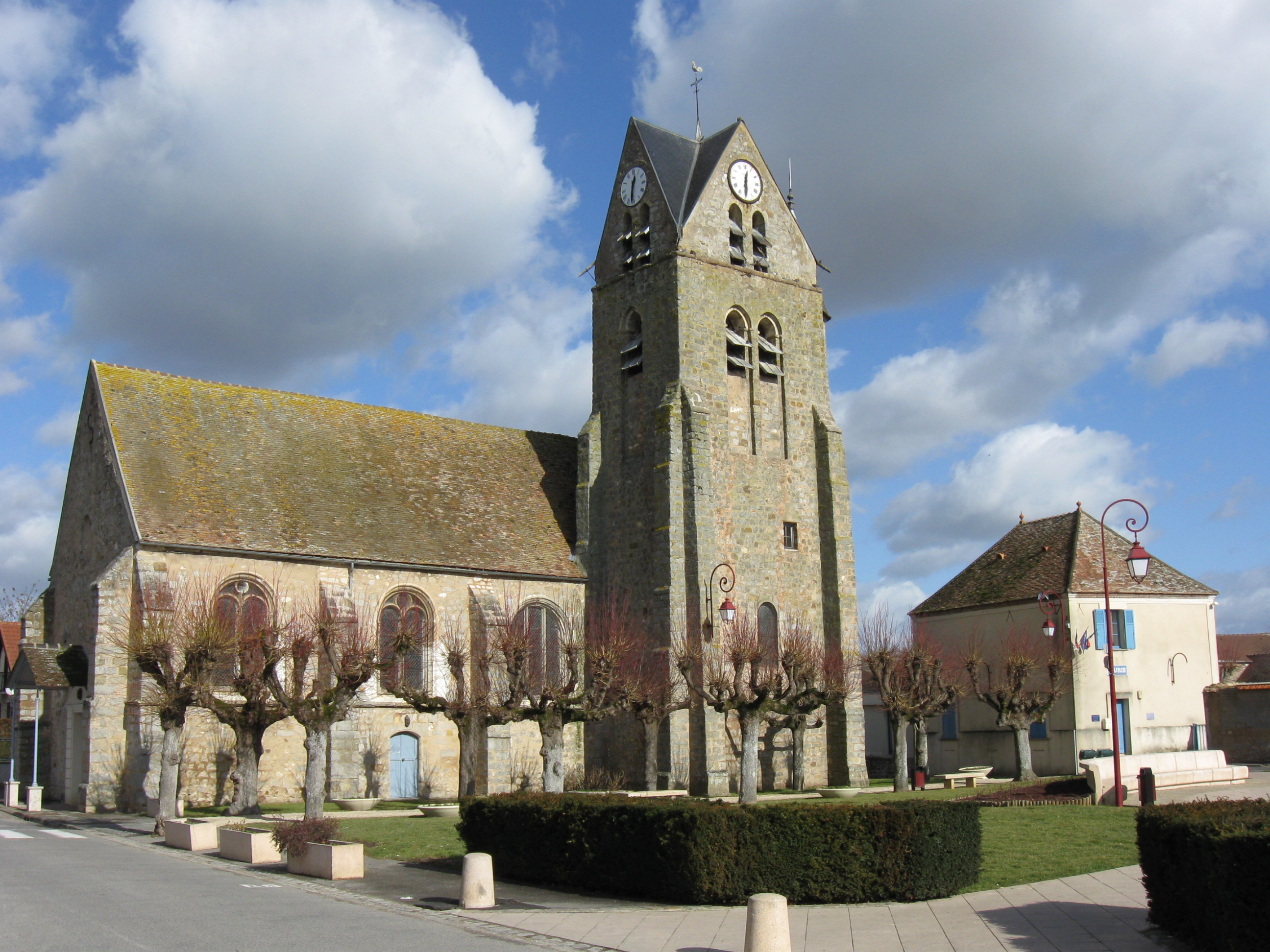
- The church in Marolles-sur-Seine

- Coat of arms
- Location of Marolles-sur-Seine
- Location within France Location within Île-de-France (region)
- Coordinates: 48°23′07″N 3°01′55″E
- Country: France
- Region: Île-de-France
- Department: Seine-et-Marne
- Arrondissement: Provins
- Canton: Montereau-Fault-Yonne
- Intercommunality: CC Pays de Montereau

Government
  - Mayor (2020–2026): Julien Poireau
- Area^{1}: 20.19 km^{2} (7.80 sq mi)
- Highest elevation: 70 m (230 ft)
- Lowest elevation: 46 m (151 ft)
- Population (2023): 1,774
  - Density: 87.87/km^{2} (227.6/sq mi)
- Time zone: UTC+01:00 (CET)
  - Summer (DST): UTC+02:00 (CEST)
- INSEE/Postal code: 77279 /77130
- ^{1} French Land Register data, which excludes lakes, ponds, glaciers > 1 km^{2} (0.386 sq mi or 247 acres) and river estuaries.

Marolles-sur-Seine (French pronunciation: [maʁɔl syʁ sɛn], literally Marolles on Seine) is a commune in the Seine-et-Marne department in the Île-de-France region in north-central France.

== Demographics ==
Inhabitants are called Marollais.

== See also ==
- Communes of the Seine-et-Marne department
