= Barbey, Seine-et-Marne =

Barbey
- Commune
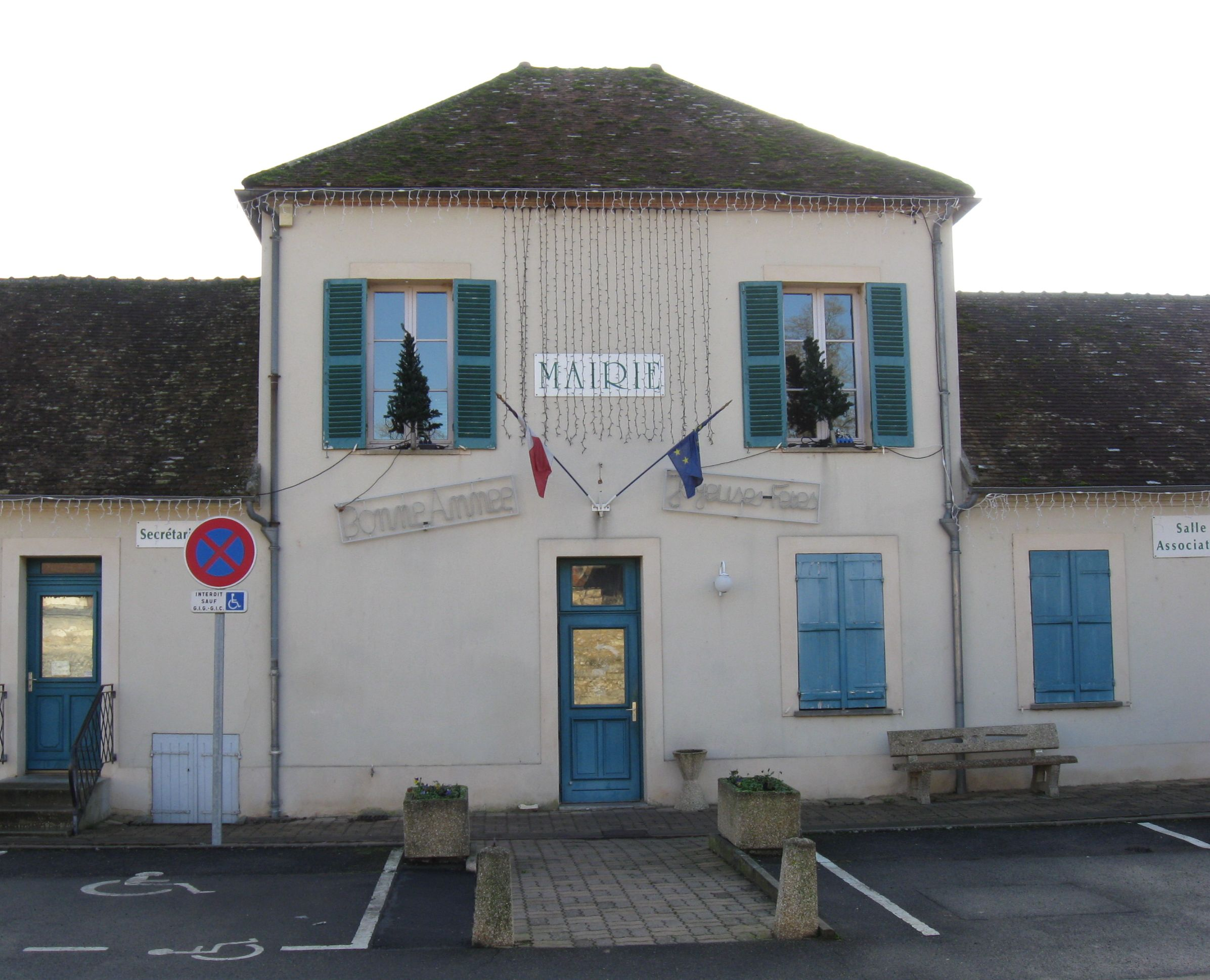
- The town hall in Barbey
- Location of Barbey
- Location within France Location within Île-de-France (region)
- Coordinates: 48°21′54″N 3°03′25″E
- Country: France
- Region: Île-de-France
- Department: Seine-et-Marne
- Arrondissement: Provins
- Canton: Montereau-Fault-Yonne
- Intercommunality: CC Pays de Montereau

Government
  - Mayor (2020–2026): Daniel Villette
- Area^{1}: 4.32 km^{2} (1.67 sq mi)
- Highest elevation: 59 m (194 ft)
- Lowest elevation: 50 m (160 ft)
- Population (2023): 153
  - Density: 35.4/km^{2} (91.7/sq mi)
- Time zone: UTC+01:00 (CET)
  - Summer (DST): UTC+02:00 (CEST)
- INSEE/Postal code: 77021 /77130
- ^{1} French Land Register data, which excludes lakes, ponds, glaciers > 1 km^{2} (0.386 sq mi or 247 acres) and river estuaries.

Barbey (French pronunciation: [baʁbɛ]) is a commune in the Seine-et-Marne department in the Île-de-France region in north-central France.

== Demographics ==
The inhabitants are called Barbésiens.

== See also ==
- Communes of the Seine-et-Marne department
