= Laval-en-Brie =

- Commune
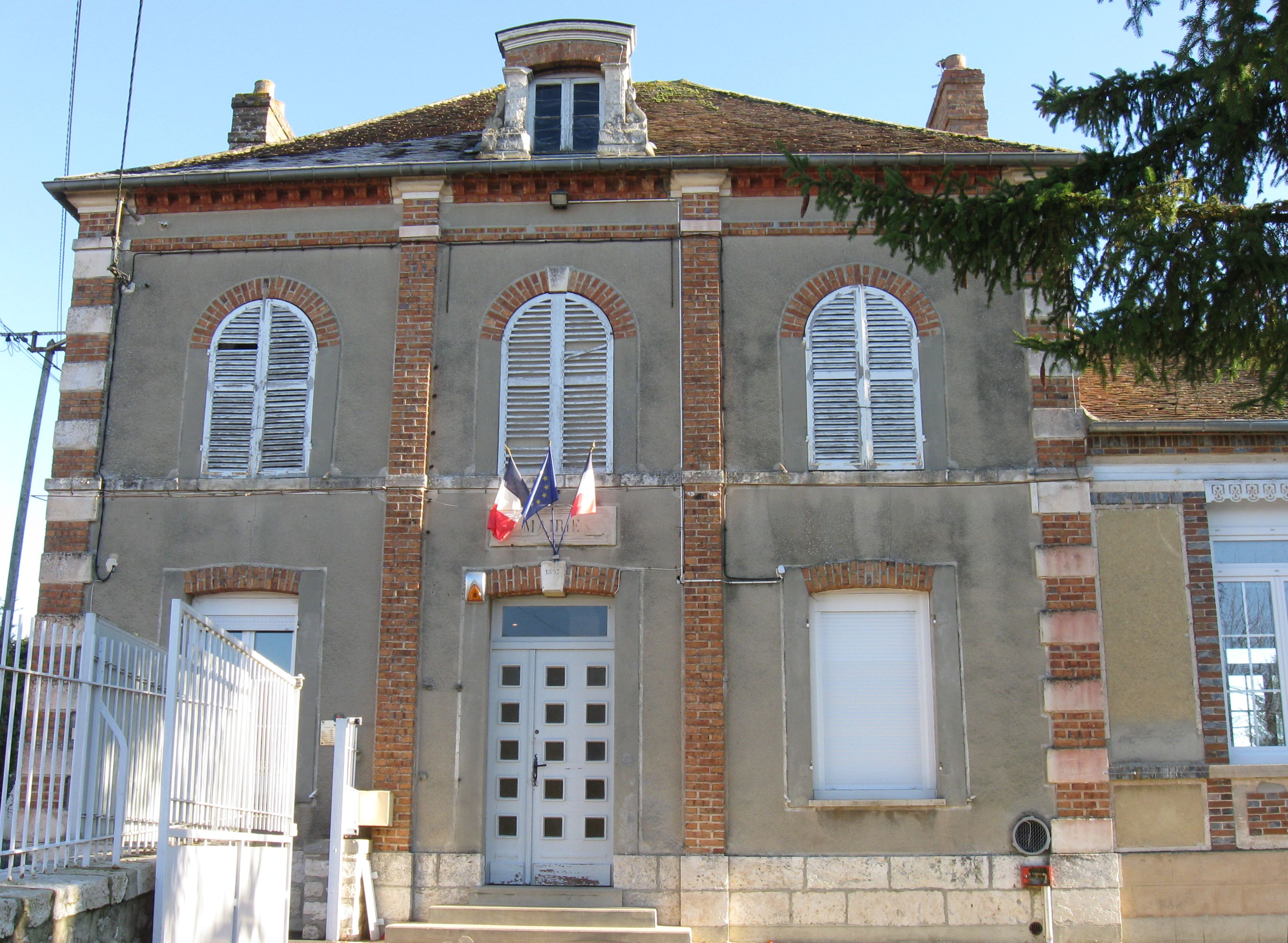
- The town hall in Laval-en-Brie
- Location of Laval-en-Brie
- Location within France Location within Île-de-France (region)
- Coordinates: 48°25′26″N 2°59′52″E
- Country: France
- Region: Île-de-France
- Department: Seine-et-Marne
- Arrondissement: Provins
- Canton: Montereau-Fault-Yonne
- Intercommunality: CC Pays de Montereau

Government
  - Mayor (2020–2026): Jérôme Bonifacio
- Area^{1}: 20.29 km^{2} (7.83 sq mi)
- Highest elevation: 134 m (440 ft)
- Lowest elevation: 84 m (276 ft)
- Population (2023): 412
  - Density: 20.3/km^{2} (52.6/sq mi)
- Time zone: UTC+01:00 (CET)
  - Summer (DST): UTC+02:00 (CEST)
- INSEE/Postal code: 77245 /77148
- ^{1} French Land Register data, which excludes lakes, ponds, glaciers > 1 km^{2} (0.386 sq mi or 247 acres) and river estuaries.

Laval-en-Brie (French pronunciation: [laval ɑ̃ bʁi]; lit. 'Laval-in-Brie') is a commune in the Seine-et-Marne department in the Île-de-France region in northern France.

== Demographics ==
Inhabitants are called Valvirois.

== See also ==
- Communes of the Seine-et-Marne department
