= La Brosse-Montceaux =

- Commune
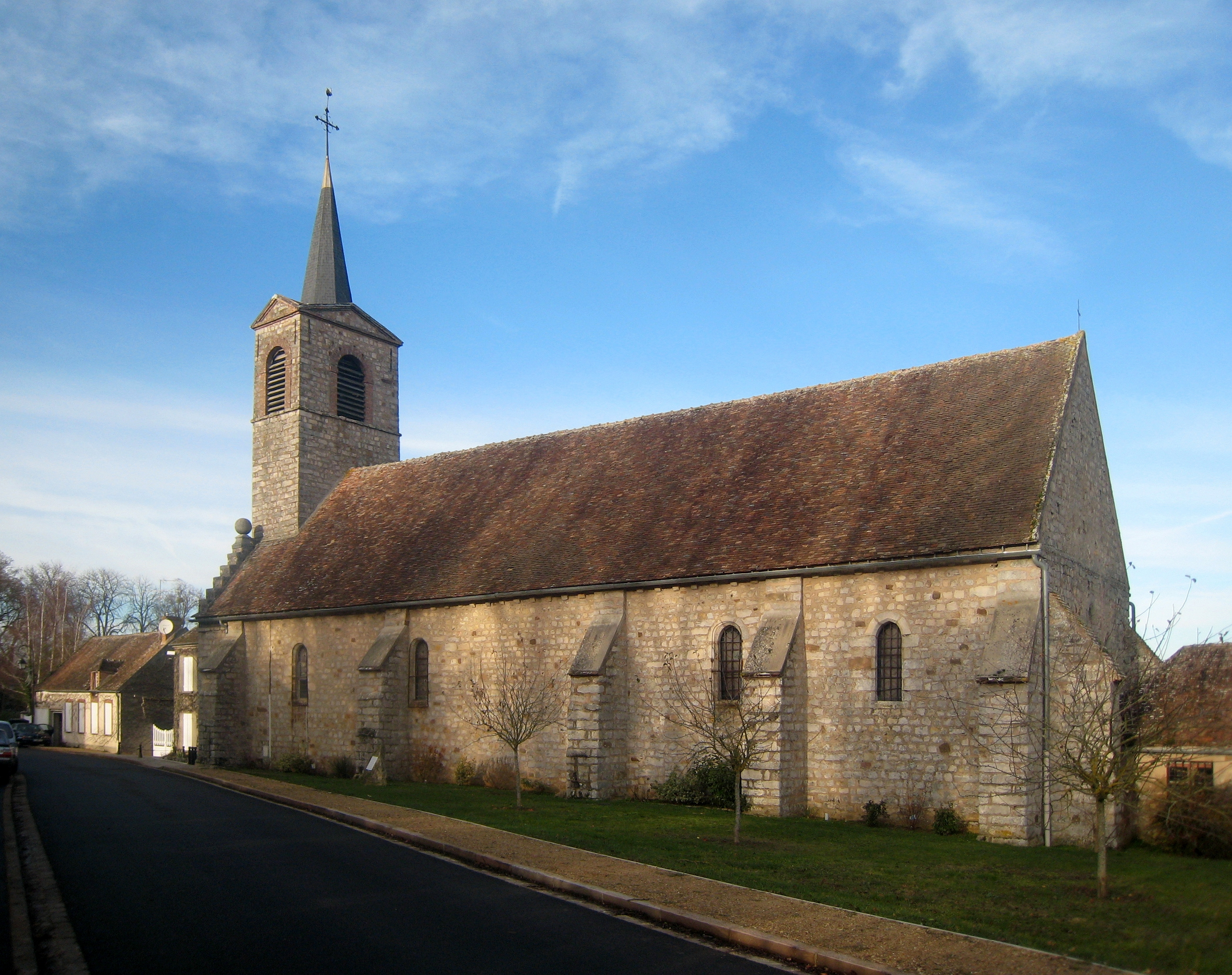
- The church in La Brosse-Montceaux

- Coat of arms
- Location of La Brosse-Montceaux
- Location within France Location within Île-de-France (region)
- Coordinates: 48°20′35″N 3°01′15″E
- Country: France
- Region: Île-de-France
- Department: Seine-et-Marne
- Arrondissement: Provins
- Canton: Montereau-Fault-Yonne
- Intercommunality: CC Pays de Montereau

Government
  - Mayor (2020–2026): Alain Demelun
- Area^{1}: 12.00 km^{2} (4.63 sq mi)
- Highest elevation: 137 m (449 ft)
- Lowest elevation: 50 m (160 ft)
- Population (2023): 776
  - Density: 64.7/km^{2} (167/sq mi)
- Time zone: UTC+01:00 (CET)
  - Summer (DST): UTC+02:00 (CEST)
- INSEE/Postal code: 77054 /77940
- ^{1} French Land Register data, which excludes lakes, ponds, glaciers > 1 km^{2} (0.386 sq mi or 247 acres) and river estuaries.

La Brosse-Montceaux (French pronunciation: [la bʁɔs mɔ̃so]) is a commune in the Seine-et-Marne department in the Île-de-France region in north-central France.

== Demographics ==
The inhabitants are called Brossois.

== See also ==
- Communes of the Seine-et-Marne department
