= Varennes-sur-Seine =

- Commune
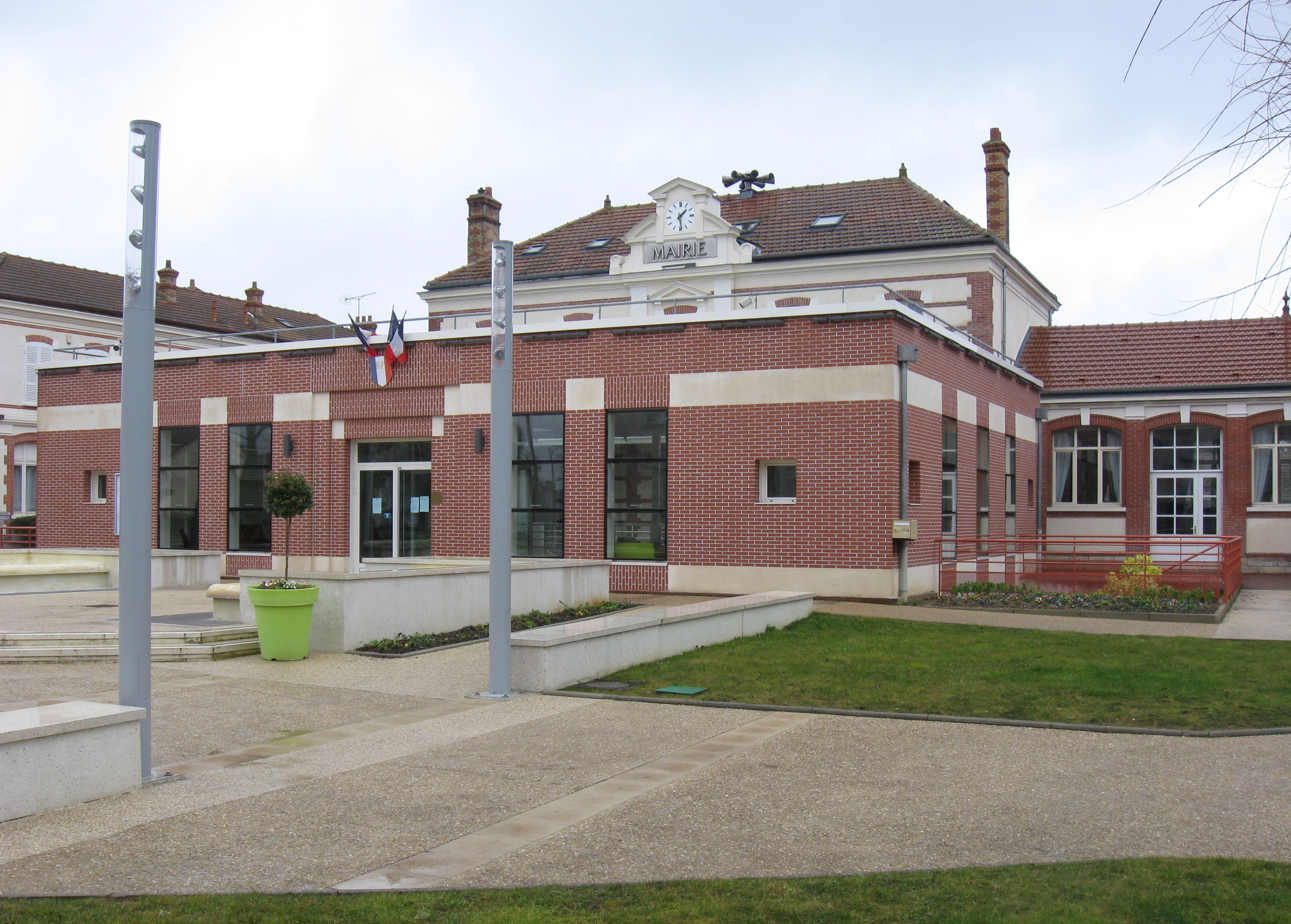
- The town hall in Varennes-sur-Seine

- Coat of arms
- Location of Varennes-sur-Seine
- Location within France Location within Île-de-France (region)
- Coordinates: 48°22′30″N 2°55′36″E
- Country: France
- Region: Île-de-France
- Department: Seine-et-Marne
- Arrondissement: Provins
- Canton: Montereau-Fault-Yonne
- Intercommunality: CC Pays de Montereau

Government
  - Mayor (2020–2026): José Ruiz
- Area^{1}: 11.01 km^{2} (4.25 sq mi)
- Highest elevation: 83 m (272 ft)
- Lowest elevation: 47 m (154 ft)
- Population (2023): 3,748
  - Density: 340.4/km^{2} (881.7/sq mi)
- Time zone: UTC+01:00 (CET)
  - Summer (DST): UTC+02:00 (CEST)
- INSEE/Postal code: 77482 /77130
- ^{1} French Land Register data, which excludes lakes, ponds, glaciers > 1 km^{2} (0.386 sq mi or 247 acres) and river estuaries.

Varennes-sur-Seine (French pronunciation: [vaʁɛn syʁ sɛn], literally Varennes on Seine) is a commune in the Seine-et-Marne department in the Île-de-France region in north-central France.

== Population ==
Historical population
| Year | Pop. | ±% p.a. |
|---|---|---|
| 1968 | 3,069 | — |
| 1975 | 3,290 | +1.00% |
| 1982 | 2,900 | −1.79% |
| 1990 | 3,055 | +0.65% |
| 1999 | 3,153 | +0.35% |
| 2007 | 3,170 | +0.07% |
| 2012 | 3,406 | +1.45% |
| 2017 | 3,469 | +0.37% |
| 2023 | 3,748 | +1.30% |
Source: INSEE

Inhabitants of Varennes-sur-Seine are called Varennois in French.

== See also ==
- Communes of the Seine-et-Marne department
