= Forges, Seine-et-Marne =

Forges
- Commune
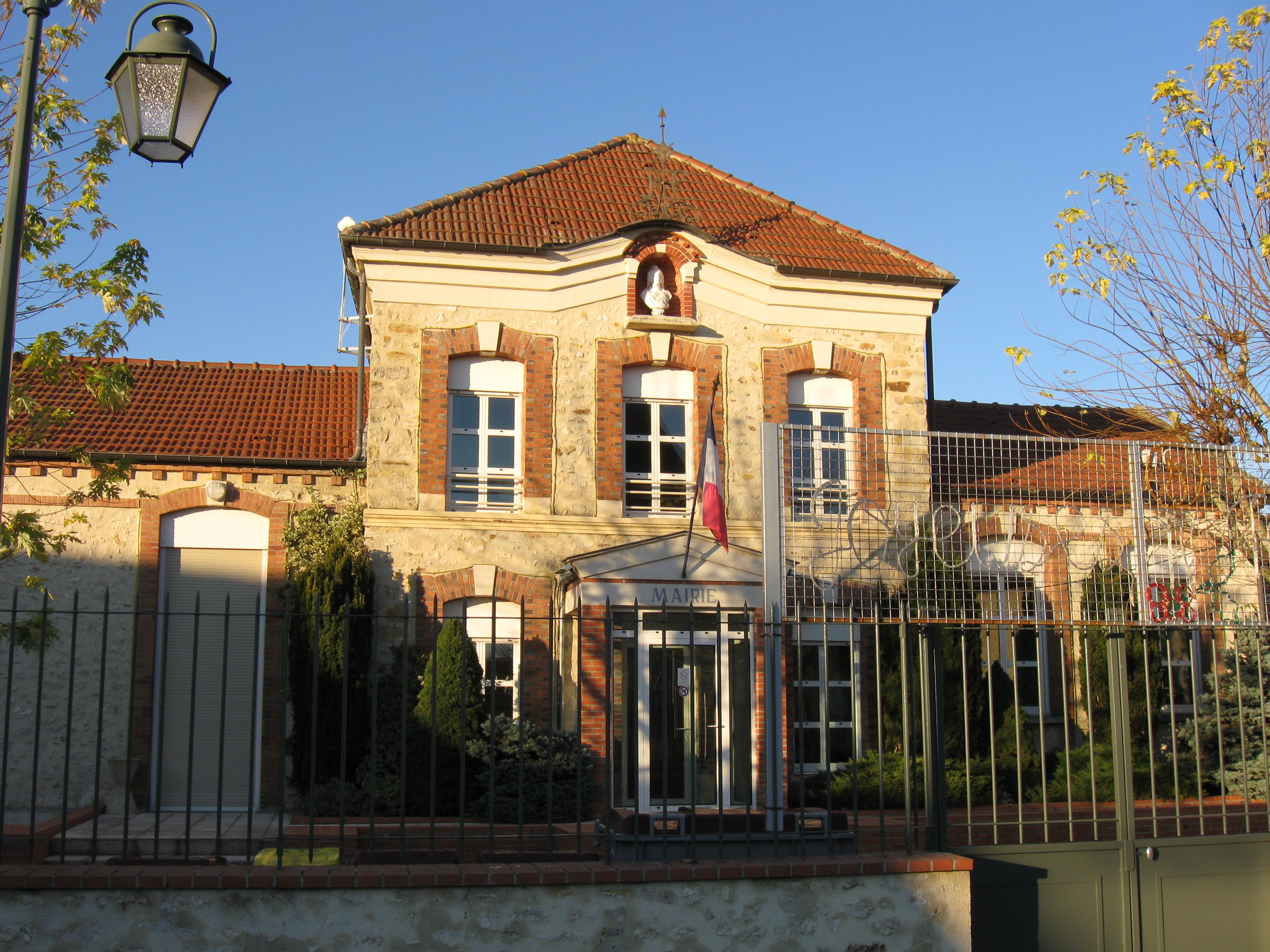
- The town hall in Forges
- Location of Forges
- Location within France Location within Île-de-France (region)
- Coordinates: 48°25′06″N 2°57′40″E
- Country: France
- Region: Île-de-France
- Department: Seine-et-Marne
- Arrondissement: Provins
- Canton: Montereau-Fault-Yonne
- Intercommunality: CC Pays de Montereau

Government
  - Mayor (2020–2026): Romain Senoble
- Area^{1}: 13.32 km^{2} (5.14 sq mi)
- Highest elevation: 123 m (404 ft)
- Lowest elevation: 97 m (318 ft)
- Population (2023): 443
  - Density: 33.3/km^{2} (86.1/sq mi)
- Time zone: UTC+01:00 (CET)
  - Summer (DST): UTC+02:00 (CEST)
- INSEE/Postal code: 77194 /77130
- ^{1} French Land Register data, which excludes lakes, ponds, glaciers > 1 km^{2} (0.386 sq mi or 247 acres) and river estuaries.

Forges (French pronunciation: [fɔʁʒ]) is a commune in the Seine-et-Marne department in the Île-de-France region in north-central France.

== Demographics ==
Inhabitants of Forges are called Forgeois.

== See also ==
- Communes of the Seine-et-Marne department
