= Courcelles-en-Bassée =

- Commune
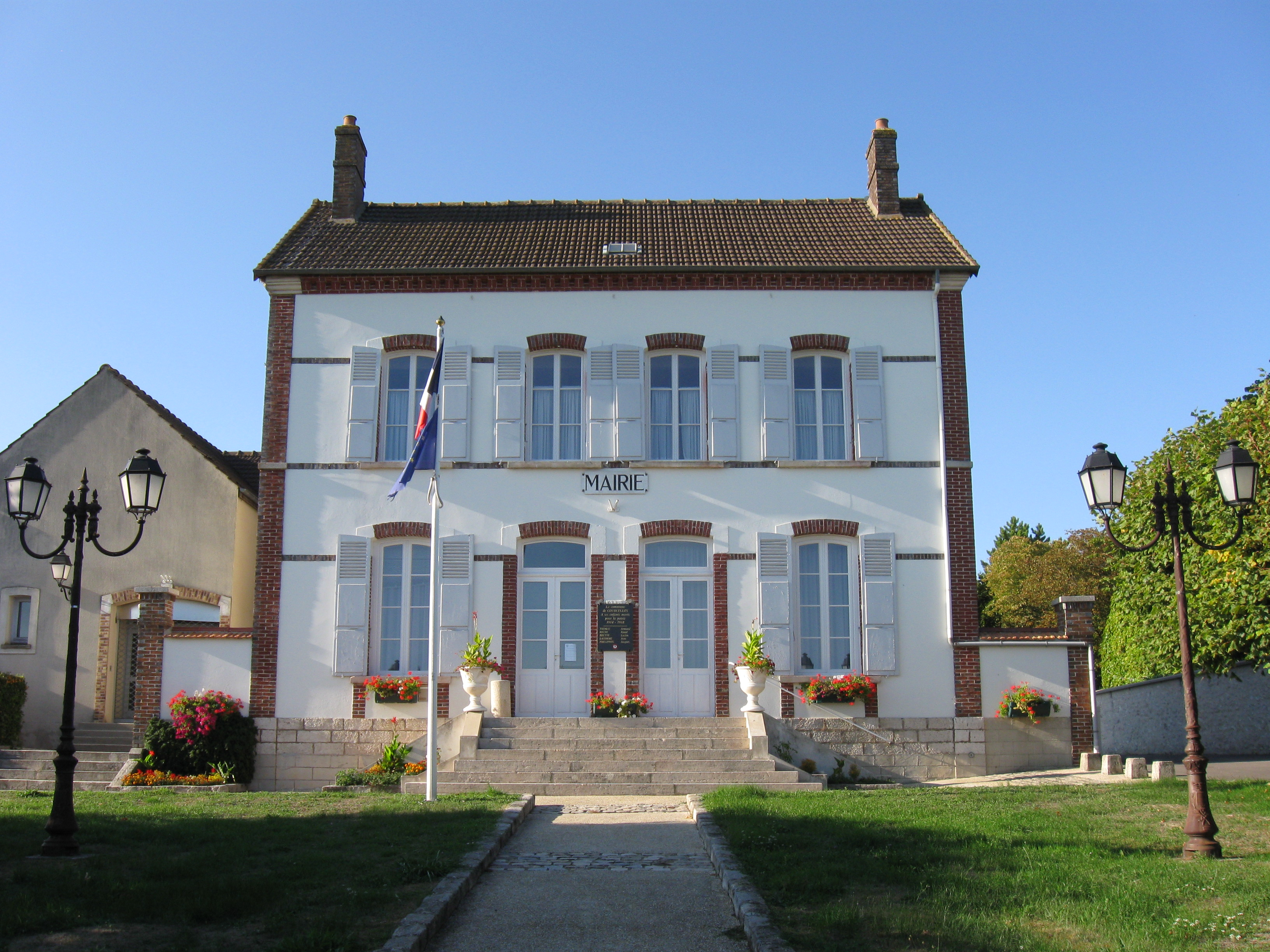
- The town hall in Courcelles-en-Bassée
- Location of Courcelles-en-Bassée
- Location within France Location within Île-de-France (region)
- Coordinates: 48°24′36″N 3°03′20″E
- Country: France
- Region: Île-de-France
- Department: Seine-et-Marne
- Arrondissement: Provins
- Canton: Montereau-Fault-Yonne
- Intercommunality: CC Pays de Montereau

Government
  - Mayor (2020–2026): Jean-Luc Auzou
- Area^{1}: 10.79 km^{2} (4.17 sq mi)
- Highest elevation: 136 m (446 ft)
- Lowest elevation: 47 m (154 ft)
- Population (2023): 223
  - Density: 20.7/km^{2} (53.5/sq mi)
- Time zone: UTC+01:00 (CET)
  - Summer (DST): UTC+02:00 (CEST)
- INSEE/Postal code: 77133 /77126
- ^{1} French Land Register data, which excludes lakes, ponds, glaciers > 1 km^{2} (0.386 sq mi or 247 acres) and river estuaries.

Courcelles-en-Bassée (French pronunciation: [kuʁsɛl ɑ̃ bɑse]) is a commune in the Seine-et-Marne department in the Île-de-France region.

== Demographics ==
The inhabitants are called Courcellois.

== See also ==
- Communes of the Seine-et-Marne department
