= Esmans =

- Commune
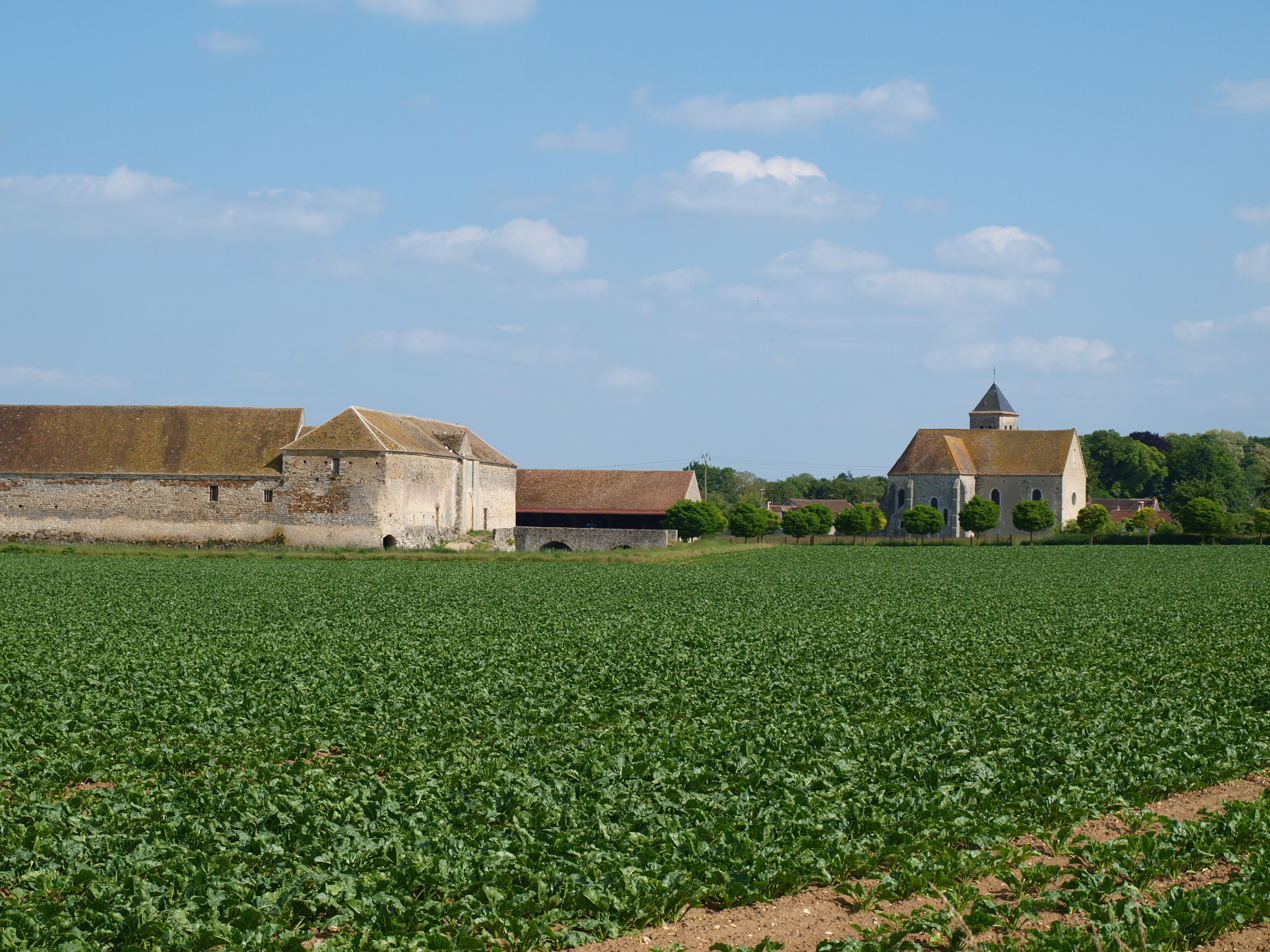
- The chateau in Esmans

- Coat of arms
- Location of Esmans
- Location within France Location within Île-de-France (region)
- Coordinates: 48°20′57″N 2°58′37″E
- Country: France
- Region: Île-de-France
- Department: Seine-et-Marne
- Arrondissement: Provins
- Canton: Montereau-Fault-Yonne
- Intercommunality: CC Pays de Montereau

Government
  - Mayor (2020–2026): Jean-Jacques Bernard
- Area^{1}: 17.83 km^{2} (6.88 sq mi)
- Highest elevation: 128 m (420 ft)
- Lowest elevation: 50 m (160 ft)
- Population (2023): 934
  - Density: 52.4/km^{2} (136/sq mi)
- Time zone: UTC+01:00 (CET)
  - Summer (DST): UTC+02:00 (CEST)
- INSEE/Postal code: 77172 /77940
- ^{1} French Land Register data, which excludes lakes, ponds, glaciers > 1 km^{2} (0.386 sq mi or 247 acres) and river estuaries.

Esmans (French pronunciation: [emɑ̃]) is a commune in the Seine-et-Marne department in the Île-de-France region in north-central France.

== Demographics ==
Inhabitants of Esmans are called Esmanais.

== History ==
the history of esmans begins in the Gallo-Roman era. In the Middle Ages Esmans is the property of the abbey of Saint-Germain-des-Prés. Several kings stayed in Esmans: Louis VII in 1139–1140, Louis VIII in 1225, Louis IX Saint Louis in 1255, and Philip IV in 1302. Guillaume Briçonnet the Bishop of Meaux will be buried in the church in 1534.

== See also ==
- Communes of the Seine-et-Marne department
