= Saint-Germain-Laval, Seine-et-Marne =

Saint-Germain-Laval
- Commune
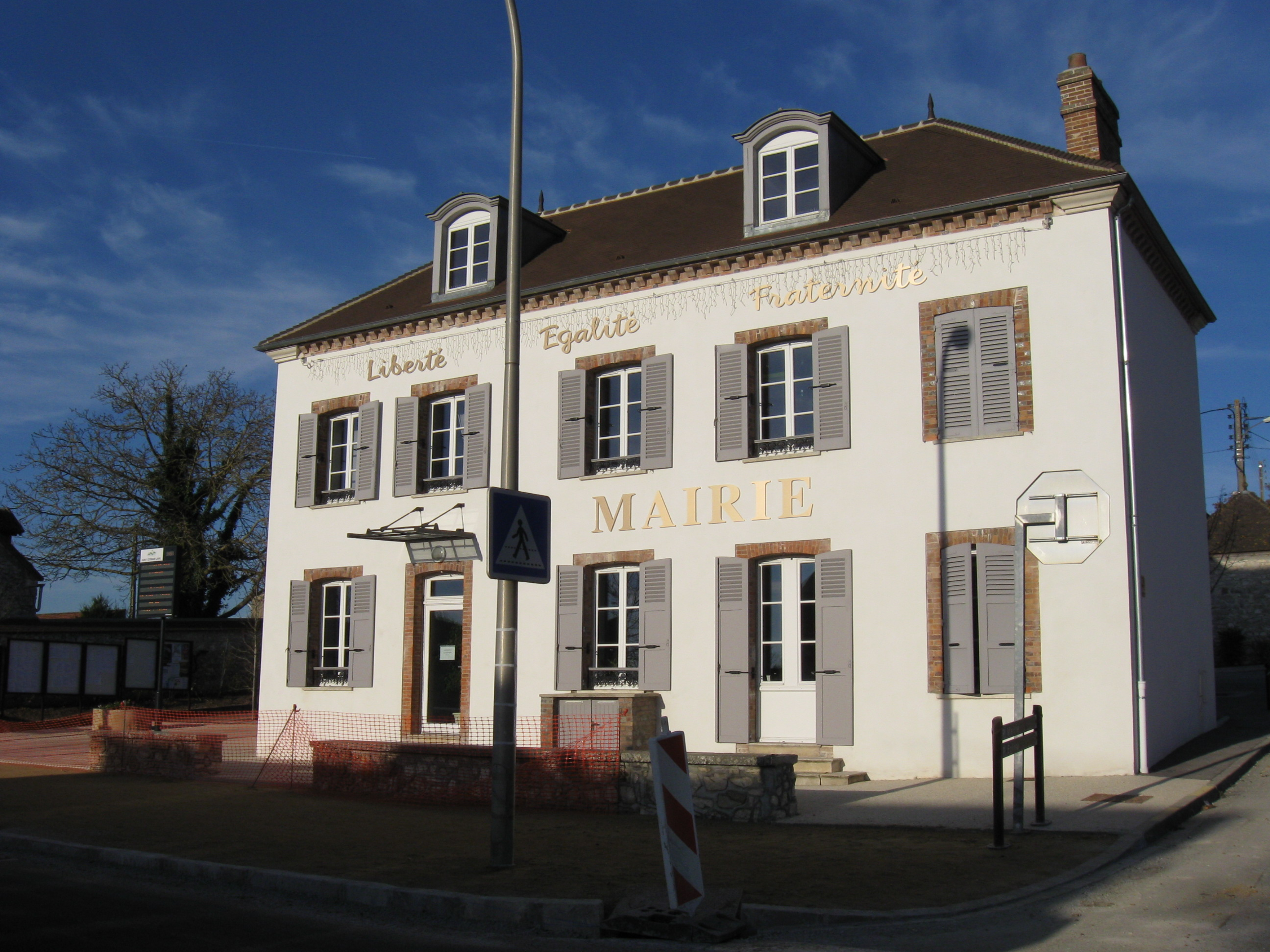
- The town hall in Saint-Germain-Laval

- Coat of arms
- Location of Saint-Germain-Laval
- Location within France Location within Île-de-France (region)
- Coordinates: 48°24′04″N 2°59′58″E
- Country: France
- Region: Île-de-France
- Department: Seine-et-Marne
- Arrondissement: Provins
- Canton: Montereau-Fault-Yonne
- Intercommunality: CC Pays de Montereau

Government
  - Mayor (2020–2026): Olivier Martin
- Area^{1}: 8.8 km^{2} (3.4 sq mi)
- Highest elevation: 133 m (436 ft)
- Lowest elevation: 47 m (154 ft)
- Population (2023): 2,888
  - Density: 330/km^{2} (850/sq mi)
- Time zone: UTC+01:00 (CET)
  - Summer (DST): UTC+02:00 (CEST)
- INSEE/Postal code: 77409 /77130
- ^{1} French Land Register data, which excludes lakes, ponds, glaciers > 1 km^{2} (0.386 sq mi or 247 acres) and river estuaries.

Saint-Germain-Laval (French pronunciation: [sɛ̃ ʒɛʁmɛ̃ laval]) is a commune in the Seine-et-Marne department in the Île-de-France region in north-central France.

== Population ==
Historical population
Year	Pop.	±% p.a.
1968	1,138	—
1975	1,134	−0.05%
1982	2,566	+12.37%
1990	2,362	−1.03%
1999	2,602	+1.08%
2007	2,762	+0.75%
2012	2,805	+0.31%
2017	2,762	−0.31%
2023	2,888	+0.75%
Source: INSEE

Inhabitants of Saint-Germain-Laval are called Saint-Germanois in French.

== See also ==
- Communes of the Seine-et-Marne department
