= Chevry-en-Sereine =

- Commune
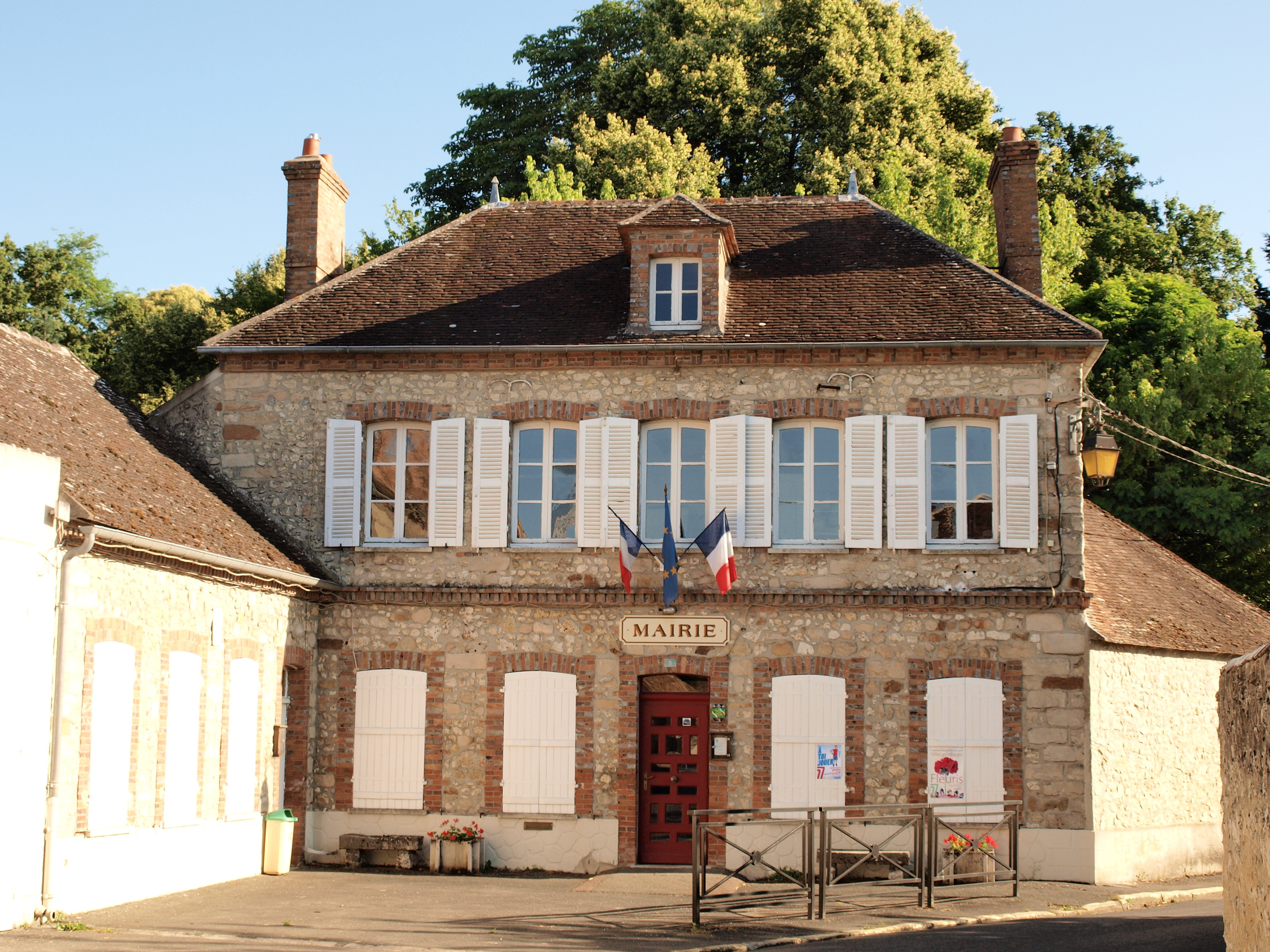
- The town hall in Chevry-en-Sereine

- Coat of arms
- Location of Chevry-en-Sereine
- Location within France Location within Île-de-France (region)
- Coordinates: 48°15′16″N 2°56′38″E
- Country: France
- Region: Île-de-France
- Department: Seine-et-Marne
- Arrondissement: Provins
- Canton: Nemours
- Intercommunality: CC Pays de Montereau

Government
  - Mayor (2020–2026): Didier Fourdrain
- Area^{1}: 22.81 km^{2} (8.81 sq mi)
- Highest elevation: 159 m (522 ft)
- Lowest elevation: 105 m (344 ft)
- Population (2023): 498
  - Density: 21.8/km^{2} (56.5/sq mi)
- Time zone: UTC+01:00 (CET)
  - Summer (DST): UTC+02:00 (CEST)
- INSEE/Postal code: 77115 /77710
- ^{1} French Land Register data, which excludes lakes, ponds, glaciers > 1 km^{2} (0.386 sq mi or 247 acres) and river estuaries.

Chevry-en-Sereine (French pronunciation: [ʃəvʁi ɑ̃ səʁɛn]) is a commune located in the Seine-et-Marne department in the Île-de-France region in north-central France.

== Demographics ==
The inhabitants are called Chevriots.

== See also ==
- Communes of the Seine-et-Marne department
