= Noisy-Rudignon =

- Commune
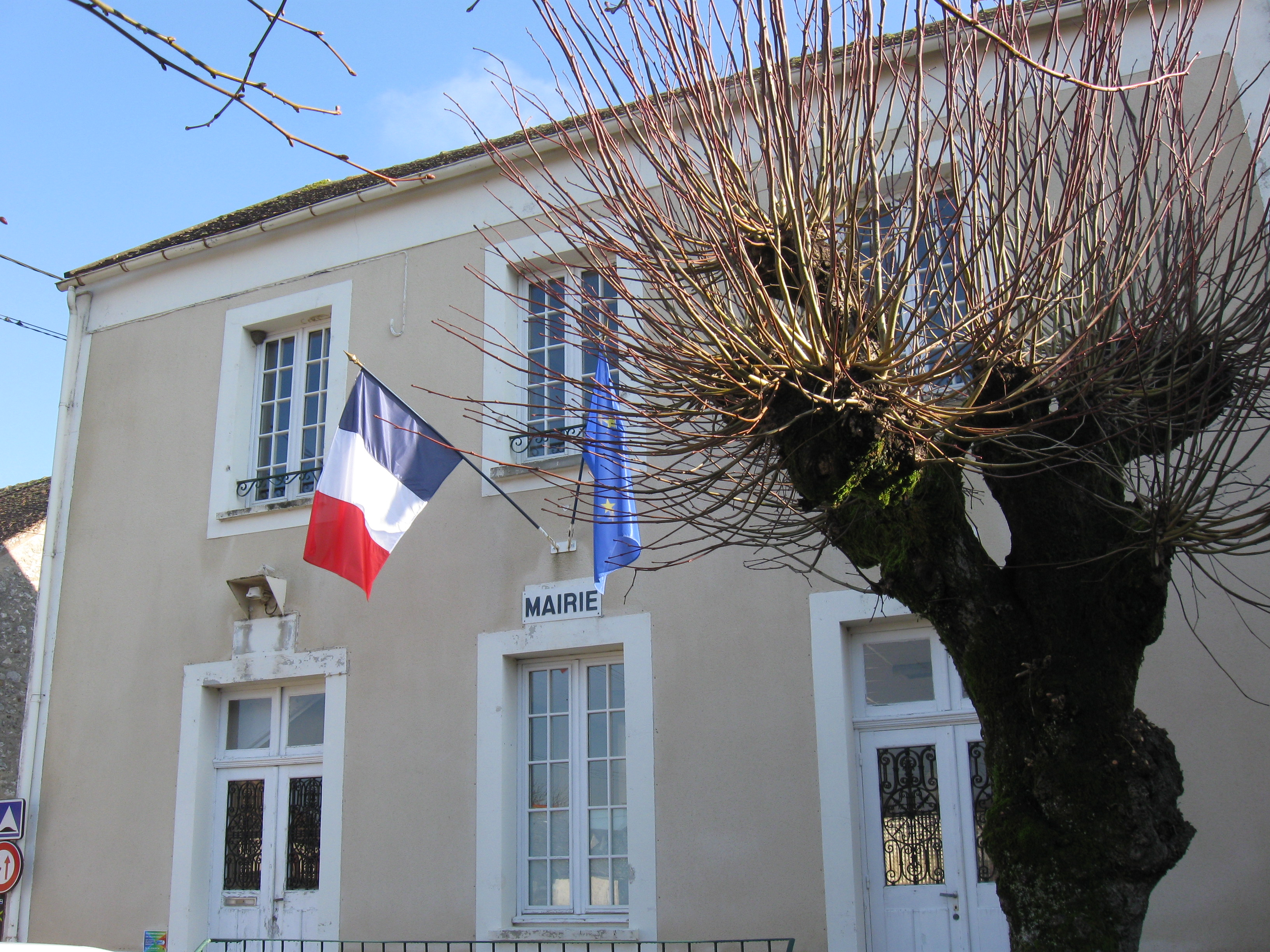
- The town hall in Noisy-Rudignon
- Location of Noisy-Rudignon
- Location within France Location within Île-de-France (region)
- Coordinates: 48°20′10″N 2°55′51″E
- Country: France
- Region: Île-de-France
- Department: Seine-et-Marne
- Arrondissement: Provins
- Canton: Nemours
- Intercommunality: CC Pays de Montereau

Government
  - Mayor (2020–2026): Gilles Zeigneur
- Area^{1}: 4.16 km^{2} (1.61 sq mi)
- Highest elevation: 126 m (413 ft)
- Lowest elevation: 55 m (180 ft)
- Population (2023): 580
  - Density: 140/km^{2} (360/sq mi)
- Time zone: UTC+01:00 (CET)
  - Summer (DST): UTC+02:00 (CEST)
- INSEE/Postal code: 77338 /77940
- ^{1} French Land Register data, which excludes lakes, ponds, glaciers > 1 km^{2} (0.386 sq mi or 247 acres) and river estuaries.

Noisy-Rudignon (French pronunciation: [nwazi ʁydiɲɔ̃]) is a commune in the Seine-et-Marne department in the Île-de-France region in north-central France.

== Demographics ==
The inhabitants are called the Noisy-Rudignonnais.

== See also ==
- Communes of the Seine-et-Marne department
