= Blennes =

- Commune
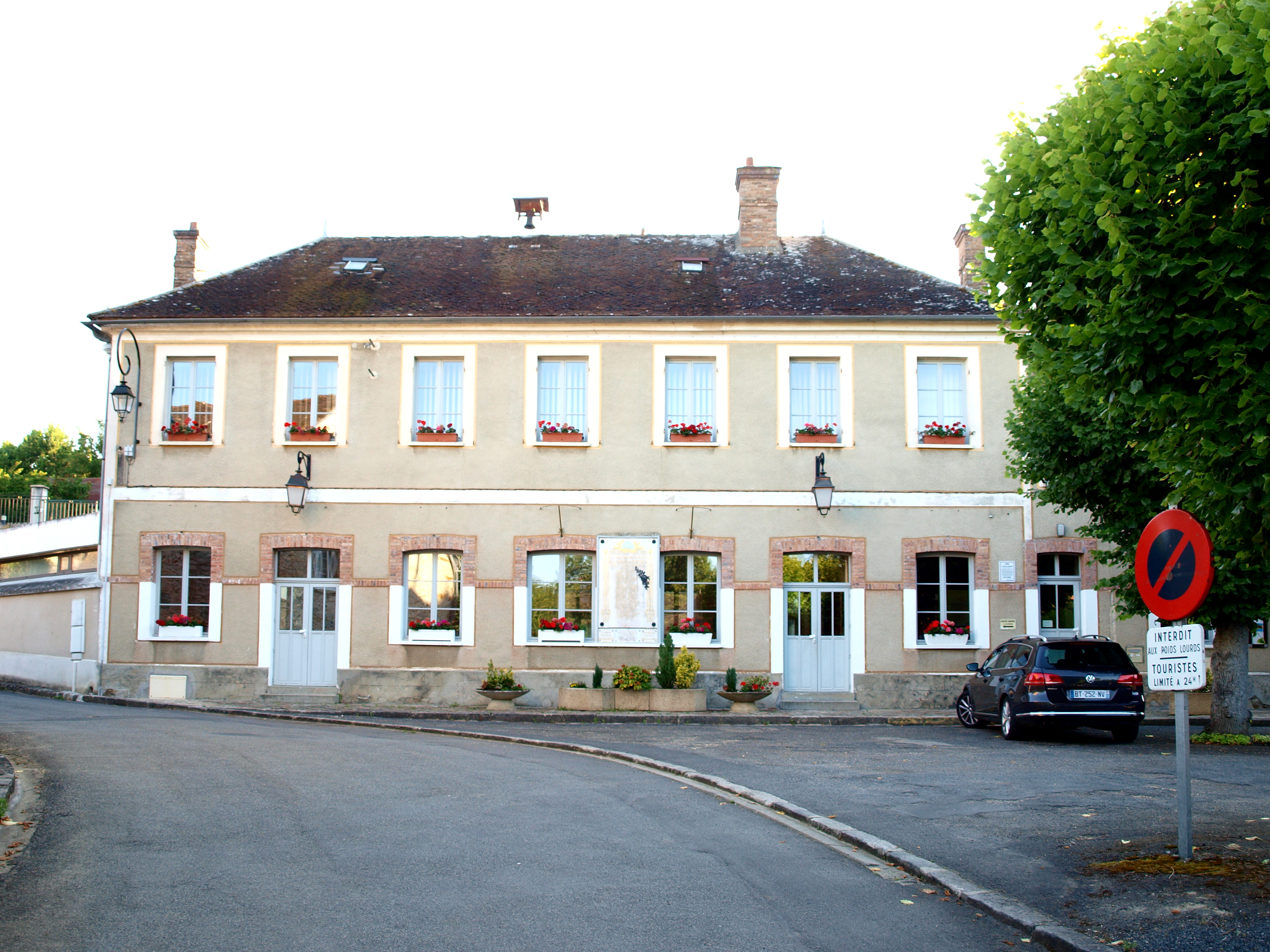
- The town hall in Blennes
- Location of Blennes
- Location within France Location within Île-de-France (region)
- Coordinates: 48°15′30″N 3°01′28″E
- Country: France
- Region: Île-de-France
- Department: Seine-et-Marne
- Arrondissement: Provins
- Canton: Nemours
- Intercommunality: CC Pays de Montereau

Government
  - Mayor (2020–2026): Pascal Dalicieux
- Area^{1}: 20.29 km^{2} (7.83 sq mi)
- Highest elevation: 162 m (531 ft)
- Lowest elevation: 98 m (322 ft)
- Population (2023): 546
  - Density: 26.9/km^{2} (69.7/sq mi)
- Time zone: UTC+01:00 (CET)
  - Summer (DST): UTC+02:00 (CEST)
- INSEE/Postal code: 77035 /77940
- ^{1} French Land Register data, which excludes lakes, ponds, glaciers > 1 km^{2} (0.386 sq mi or 247 acres) and river estuaries.

Blennes (French pronunciation: [blɛn]) is a commune in the Seine-et-Marne department in the Île-de-France region in north-central France.

== Demographics ==
The inhabitants are called Blennois.

== See also ==
- Communes of the Seine-et-Marne department
