= Thoury-Férottes =

- Commune
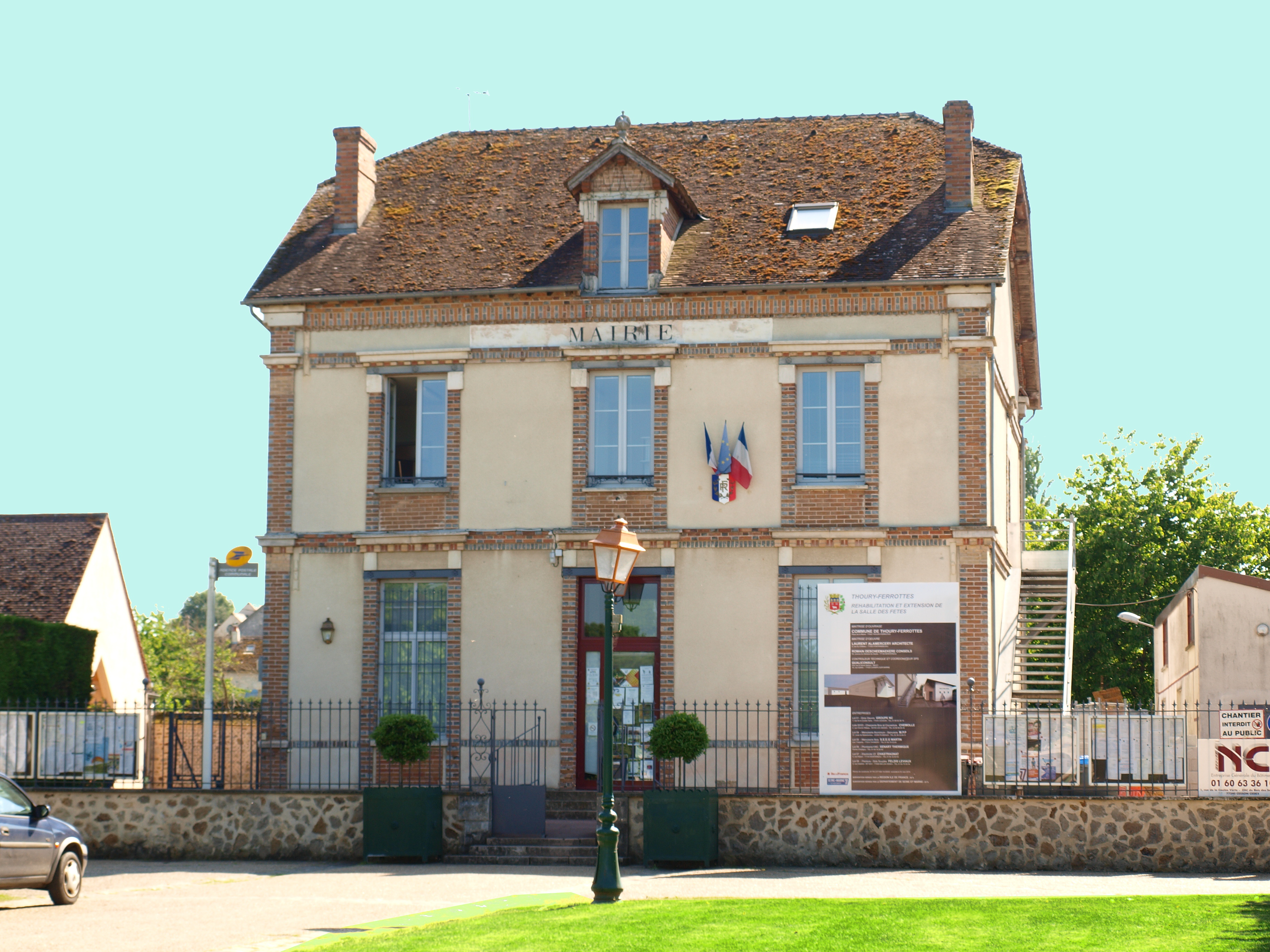
- The town hall in Thoury-Férottes
- Location of Thoury-Férottes
- Location within France Location within Île-de-France (region)
- Coordinates: 48°17′31″N 2°56′38″E
- Country: France
- Region: Île-de-France
- Department: Seine-et-Marne
- Arrondissement: Provins
- Canton: Nemours
- Intercommunality: CC Pays de Montereau

Government
  - Mayor (2020–2026): Yves Roy
- Area^{1}: 16.47 km^{2} (6.36 sq mi)
- Highest elevation: 152 m (499 ft)
- Lowest elevation: 72 m (236 ft)
- Population (2023): 649
  - Density: 39.4/km^{2} (102/sq mi)
- Time zone: UTC+01:00 (CET)
  - Summer (DST): UTC+02:00 (CEST)
- INSEE/Postal code: 77465 /77940
- ^{1} French Land Register data, which excludes lakes, ponds, glaciers > 1 km^{2} (0.386 sq mi or 247 acres) and river estuaries.

Thoury-Férottes (French pronunciation: [tuʁi feʁɔt]) is a commune in the Seine-et-Marne department in the Île-de-France region in north-central France.

== Demographics ==
Inhabitants of Thoury-Férottes are called Férottois.

== See also ==
- Communes of the Seine-et-Marne department
