= Flagy, Seine-et-Marne =

Flagy
- Commune
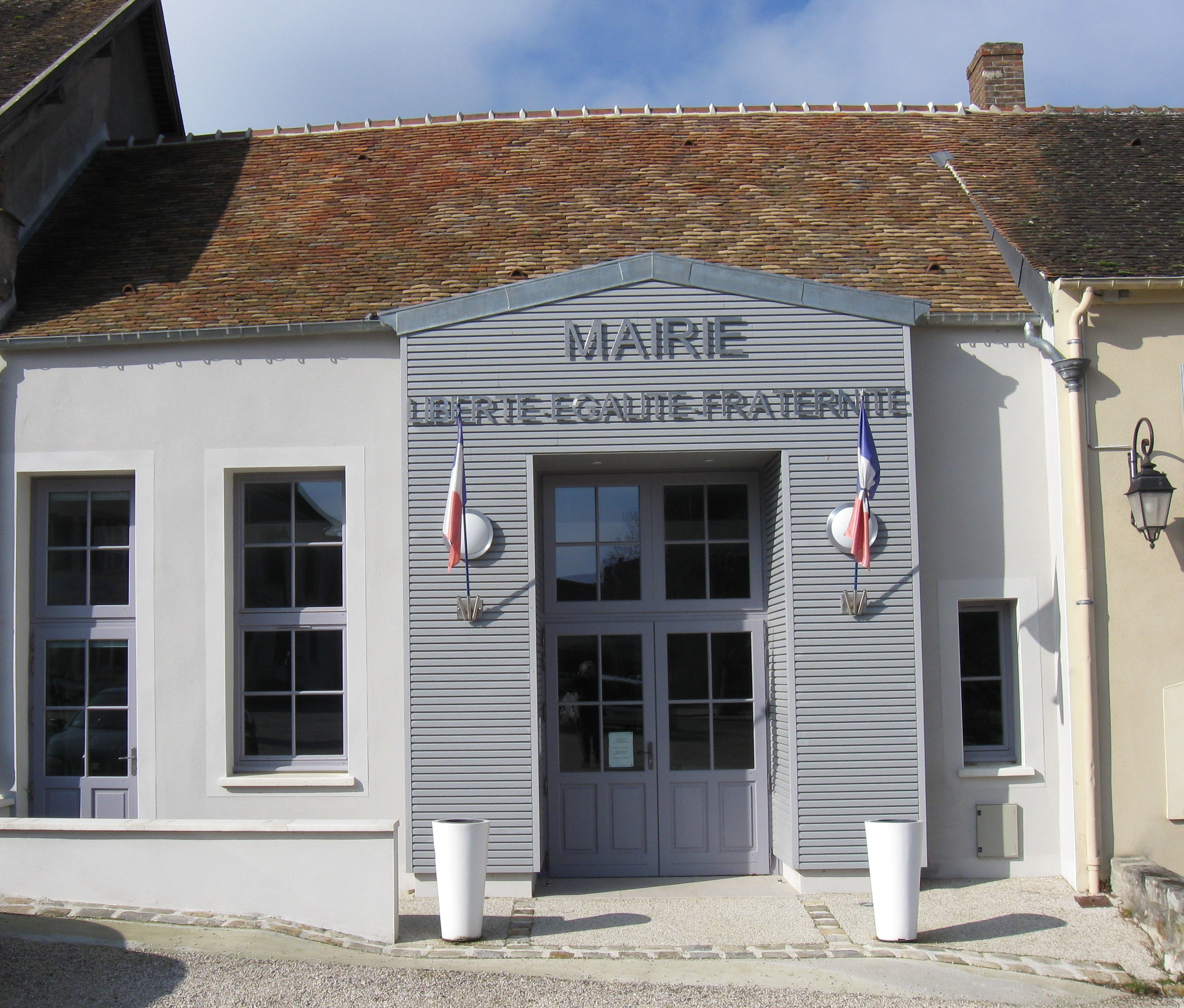
- The town hall in Flagy

- Coat of arms
- Location of Flagy
- Location within France Location within Île-de-France (region)
- Coordinates: 48°18′47″N 2°55′20″E
- Country: France
- Region: Île-de-France
- Department: Seine-et-Marne
- Arrondissement: Fontainebleau
- Canton: Nemours
- Intercommunality: CC Moret Seine et Loing

Government
  - Mayor (2020–2026): Philippe Desvignes
- Area^{1}: 7.21 km^{2} (2.78 sq mi)
- Highest elevation: 151 m (495 ft)
- Lowest elevation: 69 m (226 ft)
- Population (2023): 584
  - Density: 81.0/km^{2} (210/sq mi)
- Time zone: UTC+01:00 (CET)
  - Summer (DST): UTC+02:00 (CEST)
- INSEE/Postal code: 77184 /77940
- ^{1} French Land Register data, which excludes lakes, ponds, glaciers > 1 km^{2} (0.386 sq mi or 247 acres) and river estuaries.

Flagy (French pronunciation: [flaʒi]) is a commune in the Seine-et-Marne department in the Île-de-France region in north-central France.

== Demographics ==
Inhabitants of Flagy are called Flagiens.

== See also ==
- Communes of the Seine-et-Marne department
