= Voulx =

- Commune
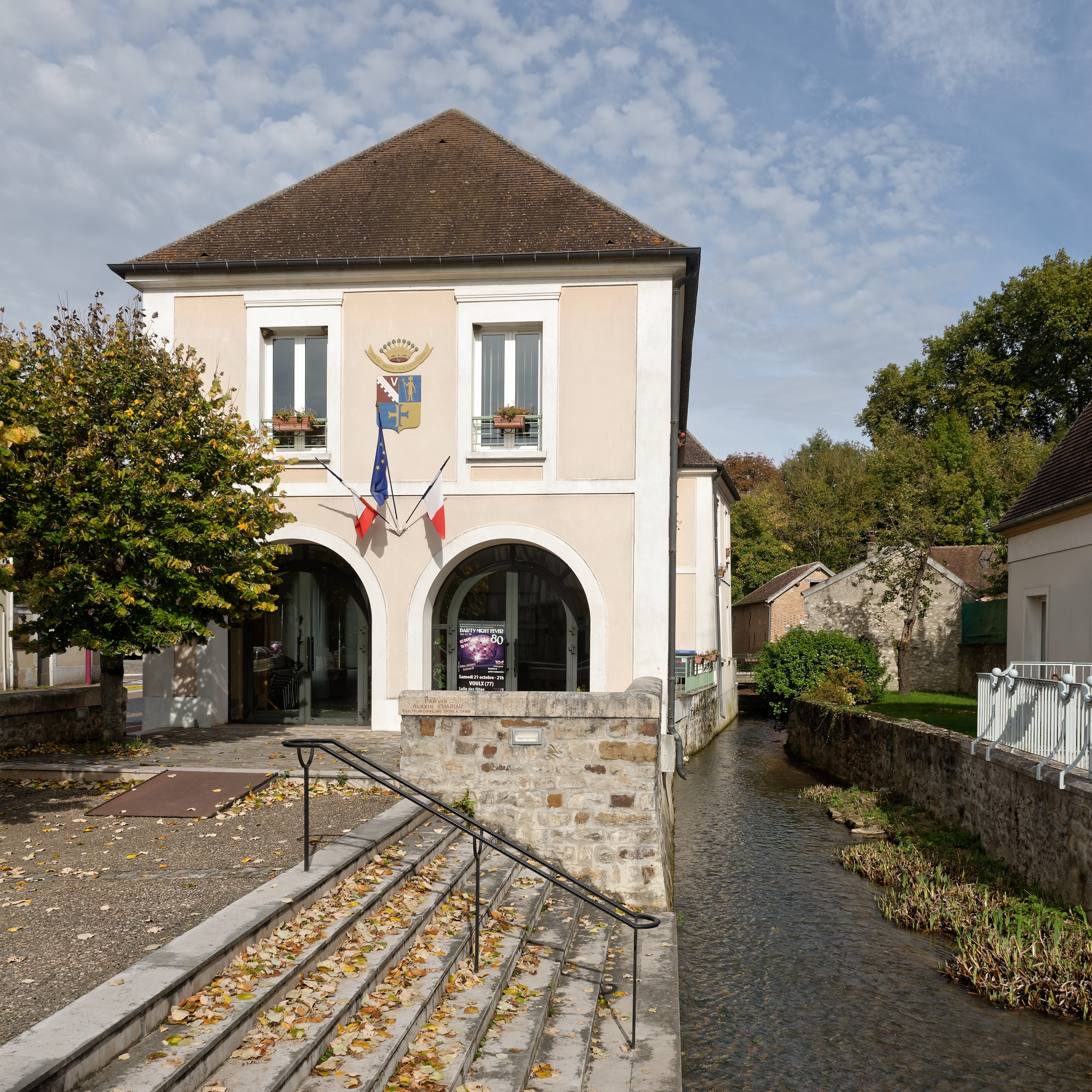
- The town hall and river Orvanne in Voulx

- Coat of arms
- Location of Voulx
- Location within France Location within Île-de-France (region)
- Coordinates: 48°16′54″N 2°58′09″E
- Country: France
- Region: Île-de-France
- Department: Seine-et-Marne
- Arrondissement: Provins
- Canton: Nemours
- Intercommunality: Pays de Montereau

Government
  - Mayor (2021–2026): Sylvain Lecosnier
- Area^{1}: 12.60 km^{2} (4.86 sq mi)
- Highest elevation: 157 m (515 ft)
- Lowest elevation: 82 m (269 ft)
- Population (2023): 1,626
  - Density: 129.0/km^{2} (334.2/sq mi)
- Time zone: UTC+01:00 (CET)
  - Summer (DST): UTC+02:00 (CEST)
- INSEE/Postal code: 77531 /77940
- ^{1} French Land Register data, which excludes lakes, ponds, glaciers > 1 km^{2} (0.386 sq mi or 247 acres) and river estuaries.

Voulx is a commune in the Seine-et-Marne department in the Île-de-France region in north-central France.

== Demographics ==
Inhabitants of Voulx are called Voulxois.

== See also ==
- Communes of the Seine-et-Marne department
