= Provinois – Brie et Seine bus network =

Bus network in France

Provinois – Brie et Seine
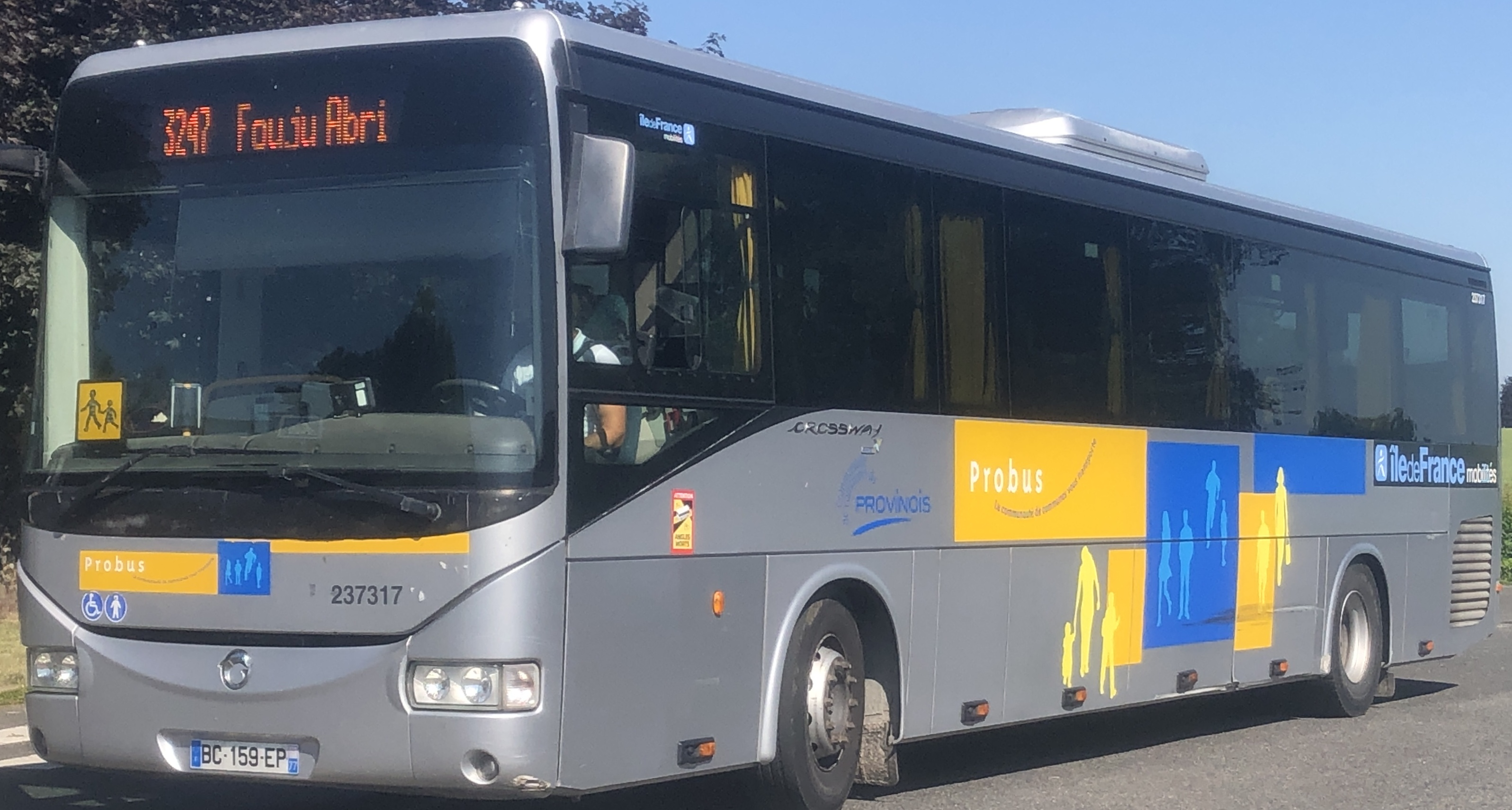
- Irisbus Crossway n°237301 operating a service of line 3247 to Fouju — Abri, at bus stop Lycée Henri Becquerel, Nangis.
- Parent: Île-de-France Mobilités
- Founded: August 1, 2023
- Service area: Aubepierre-Ozouer-le-Repos, Augers-en-Brie, Baby, Balloy, Bannost-Villegagnon, Bazoches-lès-Bray, Beauchery-Saint-Martin, Beauvoir, Beton-Bazoches, Bezalles, Boisdon, Bombon, Bréau, Cerneux, Cessoy-en-Montois, Chailly-en-Brie, Chalautre-la-Grande, Chalautre-la-Petite, Chalmaison, Champagne-sur-Seine, Champcenest, Champeaux, La Chapelle-Gauthier, La Chapelle-Rablais, La Chapelle-Saint-Sulpice, Châteaubleau, Châtenay-sur-Seine, Châtillon-la-Borde, Châtres, Chaumes-en-Brie, Chenoise, Chessy, Choisy-en-Brie, Clos-Fontaine, Compigny, Coulommiers, Courcelles-en-Bassée, Courchamp, Courpalay, Courtomer, Coutençon, La Croix-en-Brie, Cucharmoy, Donnemarie-Dontilly, Échouboulains, Égligny, Esternay, Everly, La Ferté-Gaucher, Fontaine-Fourches, Fontains, Fontenailles, Forges, Fouju, Gastins, Gouaix, Grandpuits-Bailly-Carrois, Gravon, Grisy-sur-Seine, Guignes, Gurcy-le-Châtel, Héricy, Hermé, Jaulnes, Jouy-le-Châtel, Jutigny, Léchelle, Lieusaint, Lizines, Longueville, Louan-Villegruis-Fontaine, Luisetaines, Maison-Rouge, Les Marêts, Marolles-sur-Seine, Meigneux, Melun, Melz-sur-Seine, Mons-en-Montois, Montceaux-lès-Provins, Montereau-Fault-Yonne, Montigny-le-Guesdier, Montigny-Lencoup, Mormant, Mortery, Mousseaux-lès-Bray, Mouy-sur-Seine, Nangis, Noyen-sur-Seine, Les Ormes-sur-Voulzie, Paroy, Passy-sur-Seine, Pécy, Pézarches, Poigny, Provins, Quiers, Rampillon, Rouilly, Rozay-en-Brie, Rupéreux, Saint-Brice, Sainte-Colombe, Saint-Germain-Laval, Saint-Hilliers, Saint-Just-en-Brie, Saint-Loup-de-Naud, Saint-Martin-du-Boschet, Saint-Méry, Saint-Ouen-en-Brie, Saint-Sauveur-lès-Bray, Sancy-lès-Provins, Savins, Sigy, Sivry-Courtry, Sognolles-en-Montois, Soisy-Bouy, Sourdun, Thénisy, La Tombe, Touquin, Tournan-en-Brie, Valence-en-Brie, Vanvillé, Varennes-sur-Seine, Vaudoy-en-Brie, Vaux-le-Pénil, Verneuil-l'Étang, Vieux-Champagne, Villenauxe-la-Petite, Villeneuve-les-Bordes, Villiers-Saint-Georges, Villiers-sur-Seine, Villuis, Vimpelles, Voisenon Voulton, Vulaines-lès-Provins
- Routes: 3201 3202 3203 3204 3207; 3208 3209 3210 3211 3212; 3213 3214 3215 3216 3217; 3218 3219 3240 3241 3242; 3243 3244 3245 3246 3247; 3248 3249 3250 3251 3252; 3253 3254 3255 3256 3257; 3258 3259 3260 3261 3262; 7704 7705 7707
- Operator: CFTR (Francilité Grand Provinois)
- Website: Provinois – Brie et Seine website

Provinois – Brie et Seine is a French bus network run by Île-de-France Mobilités and Communauté de communes du Provinois, operated by CFTR through his subsidiary Francilité Grand Provinois.

It consists of 43 lines which mainly serve Provins agglomeration. The network is also completed with two night lines and six demand-responsive transports.

== History ==
=== Opening to the competition ===
Due to the opening up of public transport to competition in Île-de-France, Provinois – Brie et Seine was founded on August 1, 2023, corresponding to public service delegation number 14 established by Île-de-France Mobilités. A call for tenders was therefore launched by the organizing authority to designate a company that will operate the network for a period of four years. It was finally the CFTR who gain the operation, through his subsidiary Grand Provinois, which was designated during the board of directors on March 6, 2023.

At the time of its opening to competition, the network consisted of lines 1, 2, 3, 4A, 4B, 4C, 4D, 4E, 201, 202, 203, 204, 211, Bray 3, Bray 9, Bray 11 from Les Cars Moreau, lines 1, 2, 3, 5, 6, 8, 10, 11, 12, 13, 14, 16, 17, 18, 46, TàD 52 from ProCars, line 14 from Transdev Darche Gros, lines 7, 47, 50 from Seine-et-Marne Express and liines 9A, 9B, 9C, 9D, 9E and 9Sco from ProBus.

The implementation of the network is accompanied by a restructuring of the network, going from 5 to 3 lines, the creation of night lines in Provins and Nangis (August 28, 2023), the creation of line 3219 (Longueville-Provins), the restructuring of demand-responsive transport and the application of the new regional numbering except for the three Express lines (07, 47 and 50).

However, on March 2025, the three Express lines were renamed.

The correspondence between the old and new numbers is as follows:

Network renaming
Old	New
1	3201
2	3202
3	3203
14	3204
9C	3207
9B	3208
9D; 9E	3209
10	3210
11	3211
12	3212
13	3213
14	3214
5	3215
51	3216
17	3217
8	3218
	3219
4A	3240
4B	3241
4BD	3242
4C	3243
4D	3244
4E	3245
46-1	3246
46-2	3247
46-3	3248
16	3249
201	3250
1-1	3251
5-Bray 9; 5-Bray 11	3252
5-Bray 3	3253
1-2	3254
1-3	3255
211	3256
202	3257
203	3258
9Sco	3259
204	3260
6-1	3261
3	3262
Express 47	7704
Express 50	7705
Express 07	7707

== Routes ==
=== Main routes ===
Note: Some lines have many services

Image	Line	First direction	Second direction
	3201	Fontaine-Fourches — Place Mérot	Gare de Longueville
	3202	Fontaine-Fourches — Place Mérot	Gare de Montereau
	3203	Gare de Longueville	Noyen-sur-Seine — 4 Chemins
	3204	Gare de Lieusaint-Moissy	Nangis — Collège Barthélémy
	3207	Provins — Ville Haute	Poigny — Centre
	3208	Provins — Marcel Mougenot	Gare de Champbenoist - Poigny
	3209	Provins — Ville Haute	Saint-Brice — Lotissement
	3210	Gare de Montereau	Égligny — Mairie
	3211	Gare de Longueville	Melz-sur-Seine — Centre
	3212	Gare de Provins	Sourdun — Quartier de Lattre
	3213	Gare de Marne-la-Vallée – Chessy	Bray-sur-Seine — ZI La Borne Blanche
	3214	Gare de Tournan	Villiers-Saint-Georges — Mairie
	3215	Nangis — Lycée H. Becquerel; Nangis — Collège Barthélémy	Pécy — Mairie; Jouy-le-Châtel — Corbier
	3216	Gare de Nangis (circular line)	
	3217	Gare de Longueville	Paroy — Liberté
	3218	Donnemarie-Dontilly — Collège du Montois; Donnemarie-Dontilly — Haussonville	Gare de Nangis
	3219	Gare de Longueville	Gare de Provins
	3240	Provins — Ville Haute; Provins — Lycée Les Pannevelles	Villeneauxe-la-Petite — Vernoy
	3241	Provins — Ville Haute; Provins — Lycée Les Pannevelles	Bray-sur-Seine — Cimetière
	3242	Provins — Ville Haute; Provins — Lycée Les Pannevelles	La Tombe — Mairie
	3243	Provins — Ville Haute; Provins — Lycée Les Pannevelles	Fontaine-Fourches — Place Mérot
	3244	Provins — Ville Haute; Provins — Lycée Les Pannevelles	La Tombe — Mairie
	3245	Provins — Ville Haute; Provins — Lycée Les Pannevelles	Bray-sur-Seine — La Borne Blanche
	3246	Nangis — Lycée H. Becquerel; Nangis — Collège Barthélémy	Chateaubleau — Mairie; Provins — Ville Haute
	3247	Nangis — Lycée H. Becquerel; Nangis — Collège Barthélémy	Courpalay — Le Lavoir; Fouju — Abri; Saint-Ouen-en-Brie — Salle Polyvalente
	3248	Provins — Ville Haute; Provins — Collège Marie Curie	Vanville — Beaurepaire; La Chappelle-Rablais — Les Montils; Mormant — Mairie RD619; Chateaubleau — Mairie
	3249	Donnemarie-Dontilly — Collège du Montois; Donnemarie-Dontilly — Haussonville	Maison-Rouge — Leudon; Mons-en-Montois — Le Villé; Égligny — Carrefour Gratteloup; Jurigny — Les Frelons; Montigny-Lencoup — Orvilliers; Coutençon — Ravin de Rumini
	3250	Varennes-sur-Seine — Lycée Gustave Eiffel	Fontaine-Fourches — Place Mérot
	3251	Gare de Provins; Provins — Ville Haute; Provins — Maximilien Michelin	Villiers-Saint-Georges — Les Tournelles; Esternay — Ecole; Saint-Martin-du-Bouschet — Mairie
	3252	Bray-sur-Seine — Collège Jean Rostand	La Tombe — Mairie; Bazoches-lès-Bray — Grande Rue
	3253	Bray-sur-Seine — Collège Jean Rostand	Les Ormes-sur-Voulzie — Moulin d'Ocle
	3254	Provins — Ville Haute	Sancy-lès-Provins — Toulotte; Villiers-Saint-Georges — Les Tournelles; Voulton — Gimbrois
	3255	Provins — Ville Haute	Chalautre-la-Grande — Puits Froux; Louan-Villegruis-Fontaine — Louan
	3256	Saint-Sauveur-lès-Bray	Chalmaison — Les Praillons; Gare de Longueville (in some cases)
	3257	Montereau-Fault-Yonne — Lycée André Malraux	Villiers-sur-Seine — Corps de Garde
	3258	Saint-Sauveur-lès-Bray	Noyen-sur-Seine — Place
	3259	Provins (circular line)	
	3260	Bray-sur-Seine — La Borne Blanche	Mouy-sur-Seine — Petit Peugny
	3261	Nangis — Lycée H. Becquerel; Nangis — Collège Barthélémy; Montereau-Fault-Yonne — Collège Paul Eluard; Montereau-Fault-Yonne — Surville	Varennes-sur-Seine — Lycée Gustave Eiffel; Gare de Champagne-sur-Seine; Coutençon — Ravin de Rumini
	3262	Provins — Ville Haute	Gare de Coulommiers; Boisdon — Mairie; La Ferté-Gaucher — Promenades; Jouy-le-Châtel — Corbier; Frétoy — GD Frétoy; Bannost-Villeganon — Villegagnon; Courtaçon — D204
	7704	Gare de Provins	Gare de Melun
	7705	Gare de Provins	Gare de Marne-la-Vallée – Chessy
	7707	Gare de Provins	Gare de Montereau

=== Night routes ===
The network is also completed with two night lines named Soirée Nangis and Soirée Provins.

Image	Line
	Soirée Nangis
	Soirée Provins

=== Demand-responsive transport ===
The network also operates six demand-responsive transport services named TàD Balade en Provinois, TàD Bassée, TàD Montois, TàD Nangis - La Chapelle-Rablais, TàD Nangis - Saint-Just and TàD Gare de Provins.

Image	Line
	TàD Bassée
	TàD Balade en Provinois
	TàD Montois
	TàD Nangis - La Chapelle-Rablais
	TàD Nangis - Saint-Just
	TàD Gare de Provins

== See also ==
- Île-de-France Mobilités
