= Canton of Villiers-Saint-Georges =

Coordinates: 48°38′27″N 3°21′56″E

Villiers-Saint-Georges
- Former canton
- Interactive map of Villiers-Saint-Georges
- Country: France
- Region: Île-de-France
- Department: Seine-et-Marne
- No. of communes: {{{nbcomm}}}
- Disbanded: 2015
- Area: 368.99 km^{2} (142.47 sq mi)
- Population (2012): 8,745
  - Density: 23.70/km^{2} (61.38/sq mi)

The canton of Villiers-Saint-Georges is a French former administrative division, located in the arrondissement of Provins, in the Seine-et-Marne département (Île-de-France région). It was disbanded following the French canton reorganisation which came into effect in March 2015. It consisted of 19 communes, which joined the canton of Provins in 2015.

== Demographics ==
Historical population
Year	Pop.	±%
1999	7,511	—
2006	8,312	+10.7%
2012	8,745	+5.2%

== Composition ==
The canton of Villiers-Saint-Georges was composed of 19 communes:

- Augers-en-Brie
- Beauchery-Saint-Martin
- Beton-Bazoches
- Cerneux
- Chalautre-la-Grande
- Champcenest
- Courchamp
- Courtacon
- Léchelle
- Louan-Villegruis-Fontaine
- Les Marêts
- Melz-sur-Seine
- Montceaux-lès-Provins
- Rupéreux
- Saint-Martin-du-Boschet
- Sancy-lès-Provins
- Sourdun
- Villiers-Saint-Georges
- Voulton

== See also ==
- Cantons of the Seine-et-Marne department
- Communes of the Seine-et-Marne department
