= Communauté de communes de la Gerbe =

Coordinates: 48.5153°N 3.2457°E

GERBE
- Former communauté de communes
- Country: France
- Region: Île-de-France
- Department: Seine-et-Marne
- No. of communes: {{{nbcomm}}}
- Established: 1993
- Disbanded: 2013
- Area: 117.28 km^{2} (45.28 sq mi)
- Population (1999): 5,628
  - Density: 47.99/km^{2} (124.3/sq mi)

The Communauté de communes de la GERBE is a former federation of municipalities (communauté de communes) in the Seine-et-Marne département and in the Île-de-France région of France. It was created in December 1993. It was merged into the Communauté de communes du Provinois in April 2013.

GERBE is an acronym for: Guilde Economique Rurale de la Brie Est (Rural Economic Guild of Eastern Brie); it is also the French word for "sheaf (of corn)".

== Composition ==
The Communauté de communes comprised the following communes:

- La Chapelle-Saint-Sulpice
- Chenoise
- Cucharmoy
- Longueville
- Mortery
- Poigny
- Rouilly
- Saint-Hilliers
- Saint-Loup-de-Naud

== See also ==
- Communes of the Seine-et-Marne department
