= Chalautriers =

Chalautriers may refer to:

- Chalautre-la-Petite commune inhabitants
- Chalautre-la-Grande inhabitants
