= Léchelle =

Léchelle is the name of two communes in France:

- Léchelle, Pas-de-Calais
- Léchelle, Seine-et-Marne

== See also ==
- Léchelles, a municipality in Switzerland
