= Arrondissement of Provins =

Coordinates: 48°33′29″N 3°17′49″E

Provins
- Arrondissement
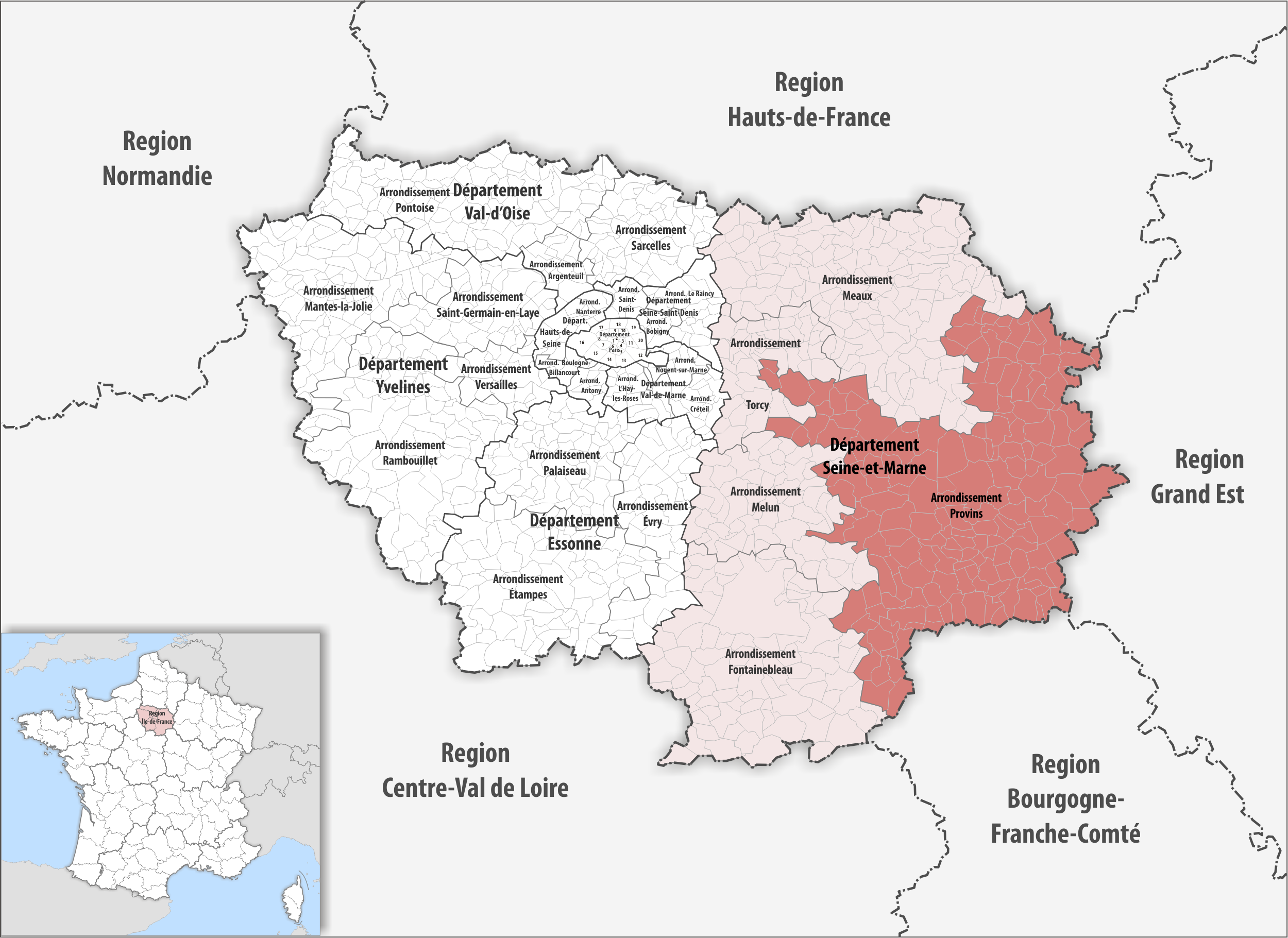
- Location within the region Île-de-France
- Country: France
- Region: Île-de-France
- Department: Seine-et-Marne
- No. of communes: {{{nbcomm}}}
- Area: 2,344.6 km^{2} (905.3 sq mi)
- Population (2023): 187,432
  - Density: 79.942/km^{2} (207.05/sq mi)
- INSEE code: 773

The arrondissement of Provins is an arrondissement of France in the Seine-et-Marne department in the Île-de-France region. It has 174 communes. Its population is 186,339 (2021), and its area is 2,344.6 km^{2} (905.3 sq mi).

== Composition ==
The communes of the arrondissement of Provins, and their INSEE codes, are:

1. Aubepierre-Ozouer-le-Repos (77010)
2. Augers-en-Brie (77012)
3. Baby (77015)
4. Balloy (77019)
5. Bannost-Villegagnon (77020)
6. Barbey (77021)
7. Bazoches-lès-Bray (77025)
8. Beauchery-Saint-Martin (77026)
9. Bellot (77030)
10. Bernay-Vilbert (77031)
11. Beton-Bazoches (77032)
12. Bezalles (77033)
13. Blennes (77035)
14. Boisdon (77036)
15. Boitron (77043)
16. Bray-sur-Seine (77051)
17. Bréau (77052)
18. La Brosse-Montceaux (77054)
19. Cannes-Écluse (77061)
20. Cerneux (77066)
21. Cessoy-en-Montois (77068)
22. Chalautre-la-Grande (77072)
23. Chalautre-la-Petite (77073)
24. Chalmaison (77076)
25. Champcenest (77080)
26. La Chapelle-Gauthier (77086)
27. La Chapelle-Iger (77087)
28. La Chapelle-Moutils (77093)
29. La Chapelle-Rablais (77089)
30. La Chapelle-Saint-Sulpice (77090)
31. Les Chapelles-Bourbon (77091)
32. Chartronges (77097)
33. Châteaubleau (77098)
34. Châtenay-sur-Seine (77101)
35. Châtres (77104)
36. Chenoise-Cucharmoy (77109)
37. Chevry-en-Sereine (77115)
38. Choisy-en-Brie (77116)
39. Clos-Fontaine (77119)
40. Courcelles-en-Bassée (77133)
41. Courchamp (77134)
42. Courpalay (77135)
43. Courtacon (77137)
44. Courtomer (77138)
45. Coutençon (77140)
46. Crèvecœur-en-Brie (77144)
47. La Croix-en-Brie (77147)
48. Diant (77158)
49. Donnemarie-Dontilly (77159)
50. Doue (77162)
51. Égligny (77167)
52. Esmans (77172)
53. Everly (77174)
54. Favières (77177)
55. La Ferté-Gaucher (77182)
56. Fontaine-Fourches (77187)
57. Fontains (77190)
58. Fontenailles (77191)
59. Fontenay-Trésigny (77192)
60. Forges (77194)
61. Frétoy (77197)
62. Gastins (77201)
63. Gouaix (77208)
64. La Grande-Paroisse (77210)
65. Grandpuits-Bailly-Carrois (77211)
66. Gravon (77212)
67. Grisy-sur-Seine (77218)
68. Gurcy-le-Châtel (77223)
69. Hermé (77227)
70. Hondevilliers (77228)
71. La Houssaye-en-Brie (77229)
72. Jaulnes (77236)
73. Jouy-le-Châtel (77239)
74. Jouy-sur-Morin (77240)
75. Jutigny (77242)
76. Laval-en-Brie (77245)
77. Léchelle (77246)
78. Lescherolles (77247)
79. Leudon-en-Brie (77250)
80. Liverdy-en-Brie (77254)
81. Lizines (77256)
82. Longueville (77260)
83. Louan-Villegruis-Fontaine (77262)
84. Luisetaines (77263)
85. Lumigny-Nesles-Ormeaux (77264)
86. Maison-Rouge (77272)
87. Les Marêts (77275)
88. Marles-en-Brie (77277)
89. Marolles-sur-Seine (77279)
90. Meigneux (77286)
91. Meilleray (77287)
92. Melz-sur-Seine (77289)
93. Misy-sur-Yonne (77293)
94. Mons-en-Montois (77298)
95. Montceaux-lès-Provins (77301)
96. Montdauphin (77303)
97. Montenils (77304)
98. Montereau-Fault-Yonne (77305)
99. Montigny-le-Guesdier (77310)
100. Montigny-Lencoup (77311)
101. Montmachoux (77313)
102. Montolivet (77314)
103. Mormant (77317)
104. Mortcerf (77318)
105. Mortery (77319)
106. Mousseaux-lès-Bray (77321)
107. Mouy-sur-Seine (77325)
108. Nangis (77327)
109. Neufmoutiers-en-Brie (77336)
110. Noisy-Rudignon (77338)
111. Noyen-sur-Seine (77341)
112. Orly-sur-Morin (77345)
113. Les Ormes-sur-Voulzie (77347)
114. Paroy (77355)
115. Passy-sur-Seine (77356)
116. Pécy (77357)
117. Le Plessis-Feu-Aussoux (77365)
118. Poigny (77368)
119. Presles-en-Brie (77377)
120. Provins (77379)
121. Quiers (77381)
122. Rampillon (77383)
123. Rebais (77385)
124. Rouilly (77391)
125. Rozay-en-Brie (77393)
126. Rupéreux (77396)
127. Sablonnières (77398)
128. Saint-Barthélemy (77402)
129. Saint-Brice (77403)
130. Saint-Cyr-sur-Morin (77405)
131. Saint-Denis-lès-Rebais (77406)
132. Sainte-Colombe (77404)
133. Saint-Germain-Laval (77409)
134. Saint-Germain-sous-Doue (77411)
135. Saint-Hilliers (77414)
136. Saint-Just-en-Brie (77416)
137. Saint-Léger (77417)
138. Saint-Loup-de-Naud (77418)
139. Saint-Mars-Vieux-Maisons (77421)
140. Saint-Martin-des-Champs (77423)
141. Saint-Martin-du-Boschet (77424)
142. Saint-Ouen-en-Brie (77428)
143. Saint-Ouen-sur-Morin (77429)
144. Saint-Rémy-la-Vanne (77432)
145. Saint-Sauveur-lès-Bray (77434)
146. Saint-Siméon (77436)
147. Salins (77439)
148. Sancy-lès-Provins (77444)
149. Savins (77446)
150. Sigy (77452)
151. Sognolles-en-Montois (77454)
152. Soisy-Bouy (77456)
153. Sourdun (77459)
154. Thénisy (77461)
155. Thoury-Férottes (77465)
156. La Tombe (77467)
157. La Trétoire (77472)
158. Vanvillé (77481)
159. Varennes-sur-Seine (77482)
160. Vaudoy-en-Brie (77486)
161. Verdelot (77492)
162. Verneuil-l'Étang (77493)
163. Vieux-Champagne (77496)
164. Villenauxe-la-Petite (77507)
165. Villeneuve-les-Bordes (77509)
166. Villeneuve-sur-Bellot (77512)
167. Villiers-Saint-Georges (77519)
168. Villiers-sur-Seine (77522)
169. Villuis (77523)
170. Vimpelles (77524)
171. Voinsles (77527)
172. Voulton (77530)
173. Voulx (77531)
174. Vulaines-lès-Provins (77532)

== History ==
The arrondissement of Provins was created in 1800. In 2006 it absorbed the canton of Rebais from the arrondissement of Meaux, and the canton of Rozay-en-Brie from the arrondissement of Melun. At the January 2017 reorganisation of the arrondissements of Seine-et-Marne, it received seven communes from the arrondissement of Fontainebleau, 15 communes from the arrondissement of Melun and two communes from the arrondissement of Torcy, and it lost 10 communes to the arrondissement of Meaux. In December 2017 the communes Ferrières-en-Brie and Pontcarré passed from the arrondissement of Provins to the arrondissement of Torcy. In August 2018 the communes Villeneuve-le-Comte and Villeneuve-Saint-Denis passed from the arrondissement of Provins to the arrondissement of Torcy.

As a result of the reorganisation of the cantons of France which came into effect in 2015, the borders of the cantons are no longer related to the borders of the arrondissements. The cantons of the arrondissement of Provins were, as of January 2015:

1. Bray-sur-Seine
2. Donnemarie-Dontilly
3. La Ferté-Gaucher
4. Montereau-Fault-Yonne
5. Nangis
6. Provins
7. Rebais
8. Rozay-en-Brie
9. Villiers-Saint-Georges
