= Frétoy =

- Commune
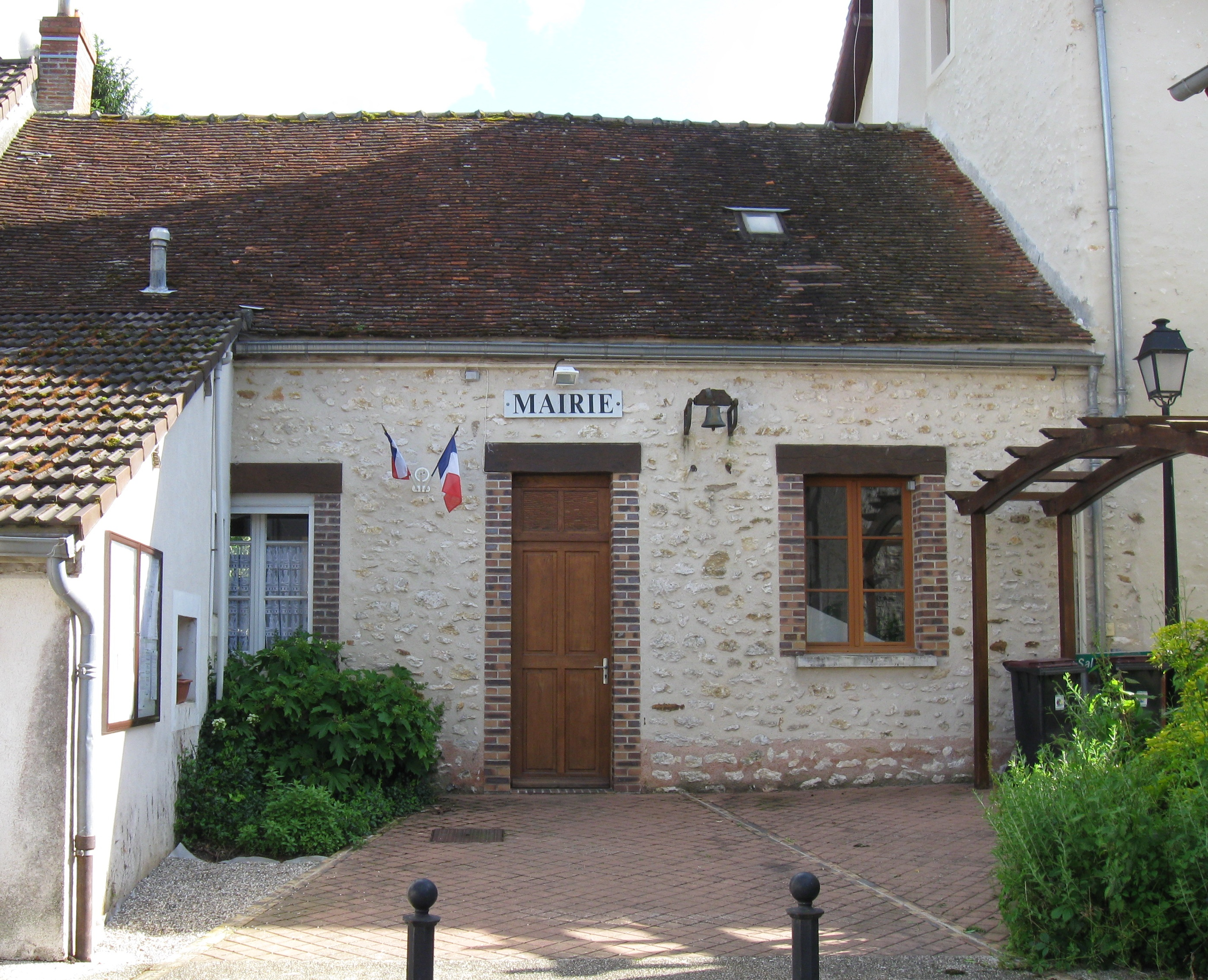
- The town hall in Frétoy
- Location of Frétoy
- Location within France Location within Île-de-France (region)
- Coordinates: 48°42′14″N 3°11′56″E
- Country: France
- Region: Île-de-France
- Department: Seine-et-Marne
- Arrondissement: Provins
- Canton: Provins
- Intercommunality: Provinois

Government
  - Mayor (2020–2026): Dominique Fabre
- Area^{1}: 6.43 km^{2} (2.48 sq mi)
- Highest elevation: 162 m (531 ft)
- Lowest elevation: 125 m (410 ft)
- Population (2023): 173
  - Density: 26.9/km^{2} (69.7/sq mi)
- Time zone: UTC+01:00 (CET)
  - Summer (DST): UTC+02:00 (CEST)
- INSEE/Postal code: 77197 /77320
- ^{1} French Land Register data, which excludes lakes, ponds, glaciers > 1 km^{2} (0.386 sq mi or 247 acres) and river estuaries.

Frétoy (French pronunciation: [fʁetwa]) is a commune in the Seine-et-Marne department in the Île-de-France region in north-central France.

== Geography ==
The village lies in the middle of the commune, on the left bank of the Aubetin, which flows westward through the commune.

== Demographics ==
Inhabitants of Frétoy are called Frétoysiens.

== See also ==
- Communes of the Seine-et-Marne department
