= Bezalles =

- Commune
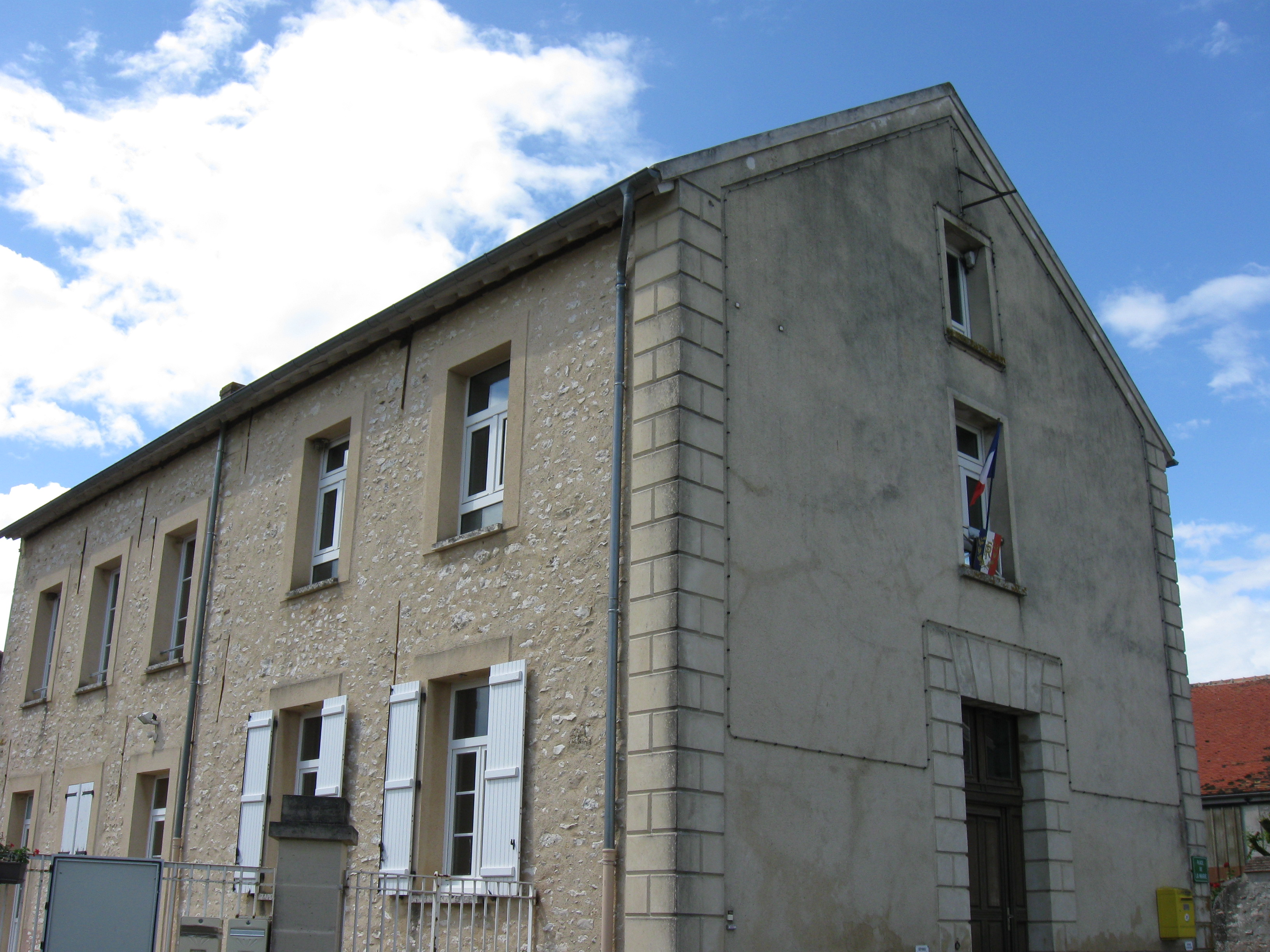
- The town hall in Bezalles
- Location of Bezalles
- Location within France Location within Île-de-France (region)
- Coordinates: 48°40′42″N 3°14′38″E
- Country: France
- Region: Île-de-France
- Department: Seine-et-Marne
- Arrondissement: Provins
- Canton: Provins
- Intercommunality: CC Provinois

Government
  - Mayor (2020–2026): Patrick Lebat
- Area^{1}: 2.66 km^{2} (1.03 sq mi)
- Highest elevation: 169 m (554 ft)
- Lowest elevation: 144 m (472 ft)
- Population (2023): 221
  - Density: 83.1/km^{2} (215/sq mi)
- Time zone: UTC+01:00 (CET)
  - Summer (DST): UTC+02:00 (CEST)
- INSEE/Postal code: 77033 /77970
- ^{1} French Land Register data, which excludes lakes, ponds, glaciers > 1 km^{2} (0.386 sq mi or 247 acres) and river estuaries.

Bezalles (French pronunciation: [bəzal]) is a commune in the Seine-et-Marne department in the Île-de-France region in north-central France.

== See also ==
- Communes of the Seine-et-Marne department
