= Saint-Brice, Seine-et-Marne =

Saint-Brice
- Commune
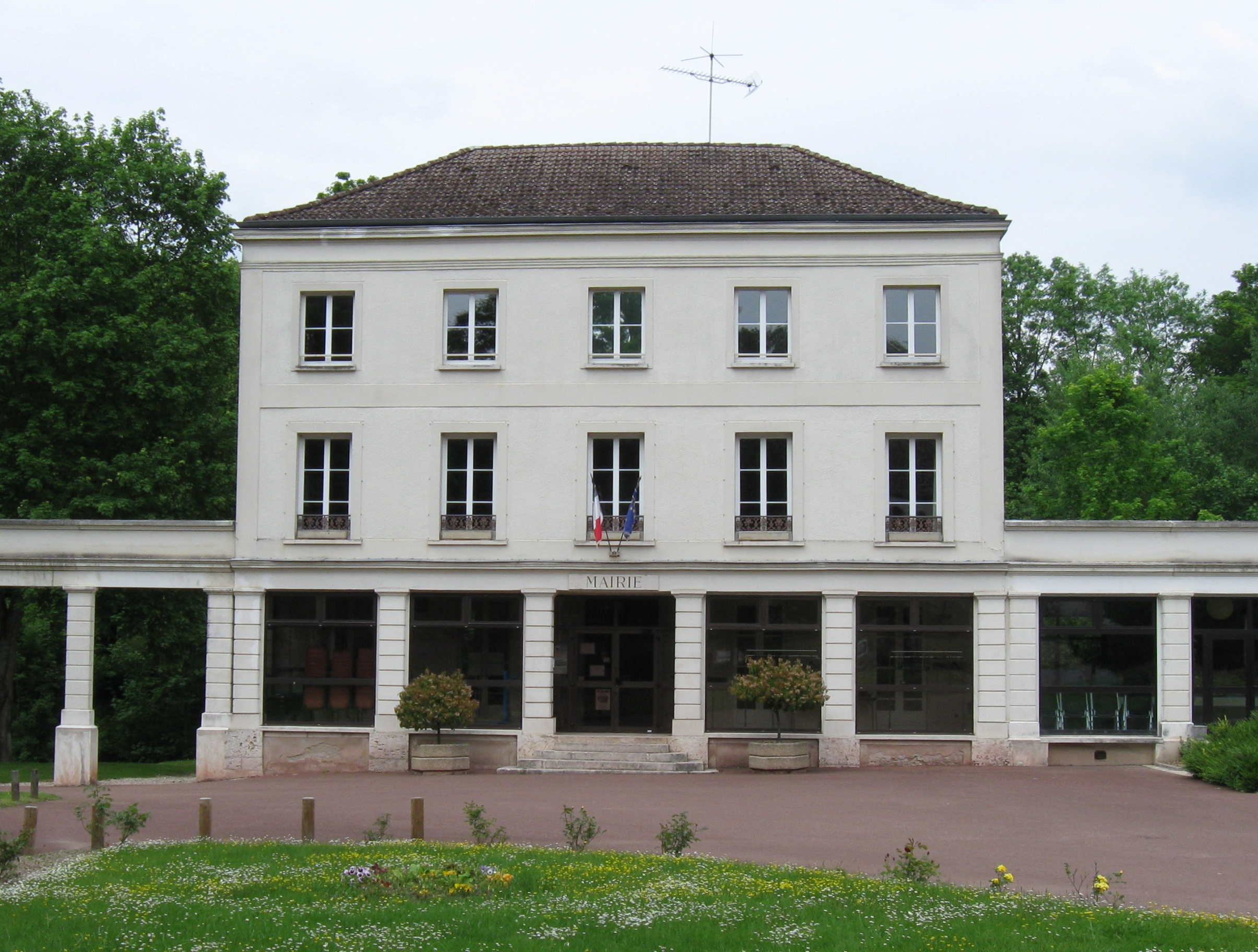
- The town hall in Saint-Brice
- Location of Saint-Brice
- Location within France Location within Île-de-France (region)
- Coordinates: 48°34′04″N 3°19′41″E
- Country: France
- Region: Île-de-France
- Department: Seine-et-Marne
- Arrondissement: Provins
- Canton: Provins
- Intercommunality: Provinois

Government
  - Mayor (2020–2026): Bernard René Langlet
- Area^{1}: 11.46 km^{2} (4.42 sq mi)
- Highest elevation: 178 m (584 ft)
- Lowest elevation: 91 m (299 ft)
- Population (2023): 819
  - Density: 71.5/km^{2} (185/sq mi)
- Time zone: UTC+01:00 (CET)
  - Summer (DST): UTC+02:00 (CEST)
- INSEE/Postal code: 77403 /77160
- ^{1} French Land Register data, which excludes lakes, ponds, glaciers > 1 km^{2} (0.386 sq mi or 247 acres) and river estuaries.

Saint-Brice (French pronunciation: [sɛ̃ bʁis]) is a commune in the Seine-et-Marne department in the Île-de-France region in north-central France.

== Demographics ==
Inhabitants of Saint-Brice are called Saint-Briçois.

== See also ==
- Communes of the Seine-et-Marne department
