= Canton of Provins =

Coordinates: 48°33′38″N 3°15′15″E

Provins
- Canton
- Country: France
- Region: Île-de-France
- Department: Seine-et-Marne
- No. of communes: {{{nbcomm}}}
- Area: 1,050.35 km^{2} (405.54 sq mi)
- Population (2023): 57,227
  - Density: 54.484/km^{2} (141.11/sq mi)
- INSEE code: 77 18

The canton of Provins is a French administrative division, located in the arrondissement of Provins, in the Seine-et-Marne département (Île-de-France région).

== Demographics ==
Historical population
Year	Pop.	±% p.a.
2013	57,939	—
2018	57,879	−0.02%
Source: INSEE

== Composition ==
At the French canton reorganization, which came into effect in March 2015, the canton was expanded from 15 to 81 communes:

- Augers-en-Brie
- Baby
- Balloy
- Bannost-Villegagnon
- Bazoches-lès-Bray
- Beauchery-Saint-Martin
- Beton-Bazoches
- Bezalles
- Boisdon
- Bray-sur-Seine
- Cerneux
- Cessoy-en-Montois
- Chalautre-la-Grande
- Chalautre-la-Petite
- Chalmaison
- Champcenest
- La Chapelle-Saint-Sulpice
- Châtenay-sur-Seine
- Chenoise-Cucharmoy
- Courchamp
- Courtacon
- Coutençon
- Donnemarie-Dontilly
- Égligny
- Everly
- Fontaine-Fourches
- Frétoy
- Gouaix
- Gravon
- Grisy-sur-Seine
- Gurcy-le-Châtel
- Hermé
- Jaulnes
- Jouy-le-Châtel
- Jutigny
- Léchelle
- Lizines
- Longueville
- Louan-Villegruis-Fontaine
- Luisetaines
- Maison-Rouge
- Les Marêts
- Meigneux
- Melz-sur-Seine
- Mons-en-Montois
- Montceaux-lès-Provins
- Montigny-le-Guesdier
- Montigny-Lencoup
- Mortery
- Mousseaux-lès-Bray
- Mouy-sur-Seine
- Noyen-sur-Seine
- Les Ormes-sur-Voulzie
- Paroy
- Passy-sur-Seine
- Poigny
- Provins
- Rouilly
- Rupéreux
- Saint-Brice
- Sainte-Colombe
- Saint-Hilliers
- Saint-Loup-de-Naud
- Saint-Martin-du-Boschet
- Saint-Sauveur-lès-Bray
- Sancy-lès-Provins
- Savins
- Sigy
- Sognolles-en-Montois
- Soisy-Bouy
- Vulaines-lès-Provins
- Sourdun
- Thénisy
- La Tombe
- Villenauxe-la-Petite
- Villeneuve-les-Bordes
- Villiers-Saint-Georges
- Villiers-sur-Seine
- Villuis
- Vimpelles
- Voulton

== See also ==
- Cantons of the Seine-et-Marne department
- Communes of the Seine-et-Marne department
