= Bannost-Villegagnon =

- Commune
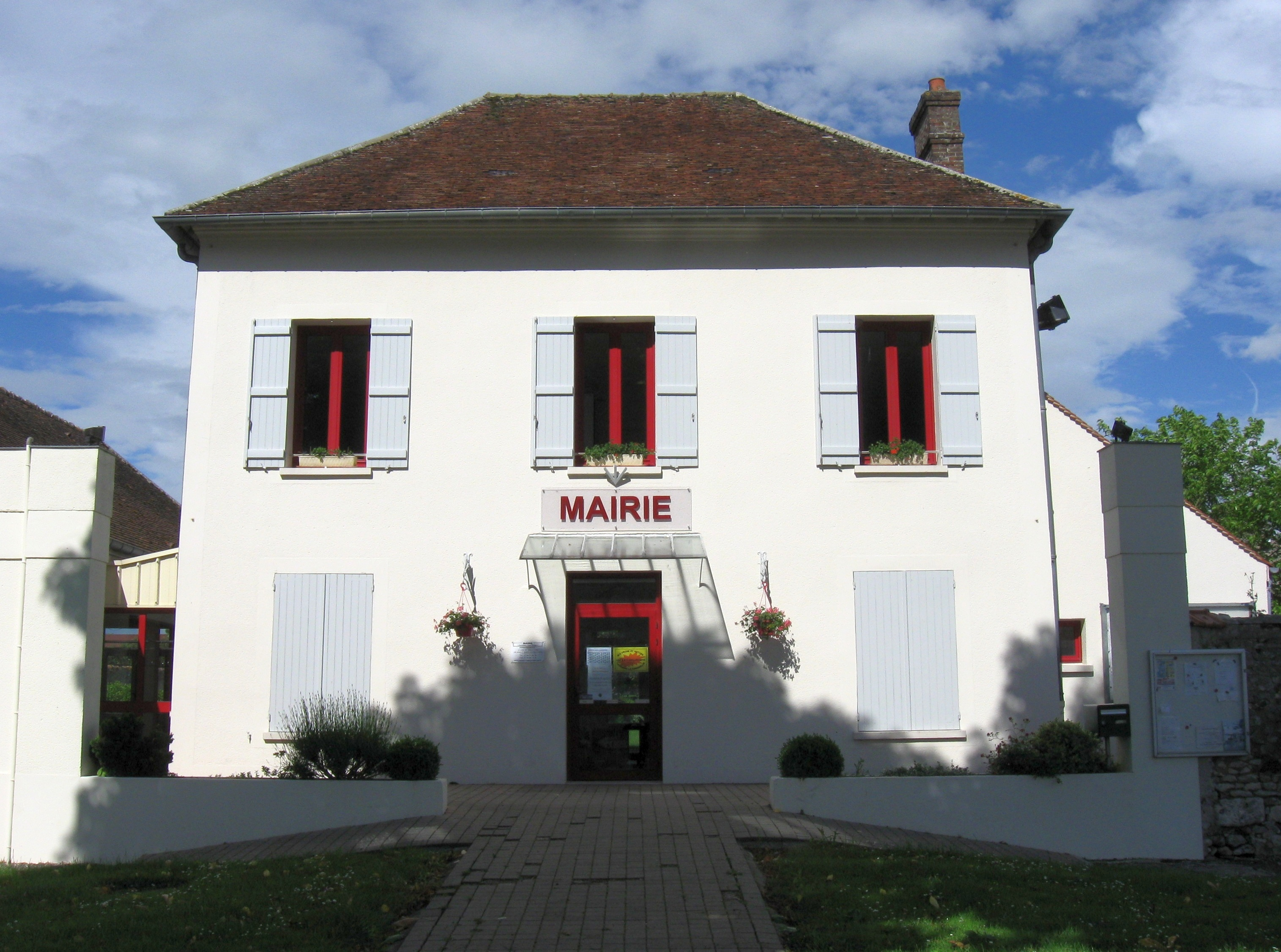
- The town hall in Bannost-Villegagnon
- Location of Bannost-Villegagnon
- Location within France Location within Île-de-France (region)
- Coordinates: 48°40′41″N 3°11′33″E
- Country: France
- Region: Île-de-France
- Department: Seine-et-Marne
- Arrondissement: Provins
- Canton: Provins
- Intercommunality: CC Provinois

Government
  - Mayor (2020–2026): Alexandre De Meulenaere
- Area^{1}: 19.41 km^{2} (7.49 sq mi)
- Highest elevation: 166 m (545 ft)
- Lowest elevation: 125 m (410 ft)
- Population (2023): 667
  - Density: 34.4/km^{2} (89.0/sq mi)
- Time zone: UTC+01:00 (CET)
  - Summer (DST): UTC+02:00 (CEST)
- INSEE/Postal code: 77020 /77970
- ^{1} French Land Register data, which excludes lakes, ponds, glaciers > 1 km^{2} (0.386 sq mi or 247 acres) and river estuaries.

Bannost-Villegagnon (French pronunciation: [bano vilɡaɲɔ̃]) is a commune in the Seine-et-Marne department in the Île-de-France region in north-central France. It was created in 1973 by the merger of two former communes: Bannost and Villegagnon.

== Demographics ==
The inhabitants are called Bannostiens-Villegagnonnais.

== See also ==
- Communes of the Seine-et-Marne department
