= Lizines =

- Commune
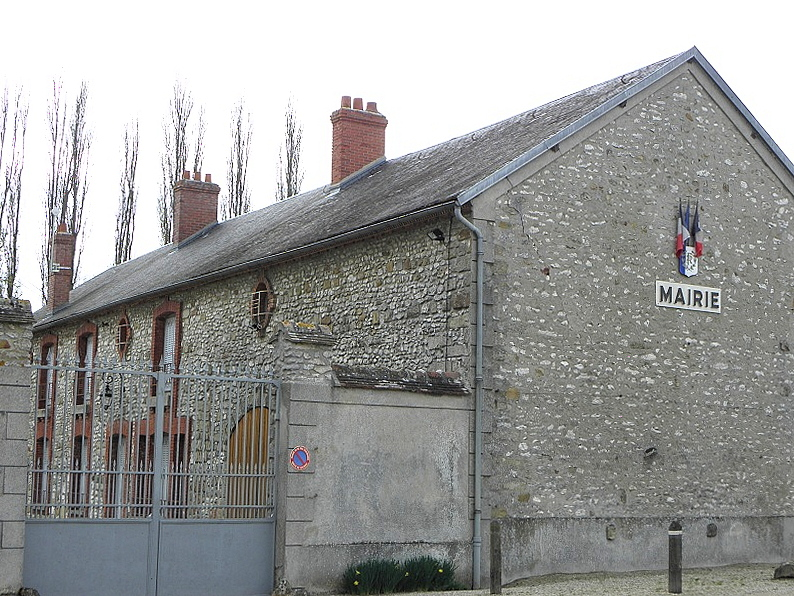
- The town hall in Lizines
- Location of Lizines
- Location within France Location within Île-de-France (region)
- Coordinates: 48°31′35″N 3°10′46″E
- Country: France
- Region: Île-de-France
- Department: Seine-et-Marne
- Arrondissement: Provins
- Canton: Provins
- Intercommunality: CC Bassée - Montois

Government
  - Mayor (2020–2026): Didier Frappat
- Area^{1}: 5.77 km^{2} (2.23 sq mi)
- Highest elevation: 154 m (505 ft)
- Lowest elevation: 105 m (344 ft)
- Population (2023): 174
  - Density: 30.2/km^{2} (78.1/sq mi)
- Demonym: Lizinois
- Time zone: UTC+01:00 (CET)
  - Summer (DST): UTC+02:00 (CEST)
- INSEE/Postal code: 77256 /77650
- ^{1} French Land Register data, which excludes lakes, ponds, glaciers > 1 km^{2} (0.386 sq mi or 247 acres) and river estuaries.

Lizines (French pronunciation: [lizin]) is a commune in the Seine-et-Marne department in the Île-de-France region in north-central France.

== See also ==
- Communes of the Seine-et-Marne department
