= Maison-Rouge =

- Commune
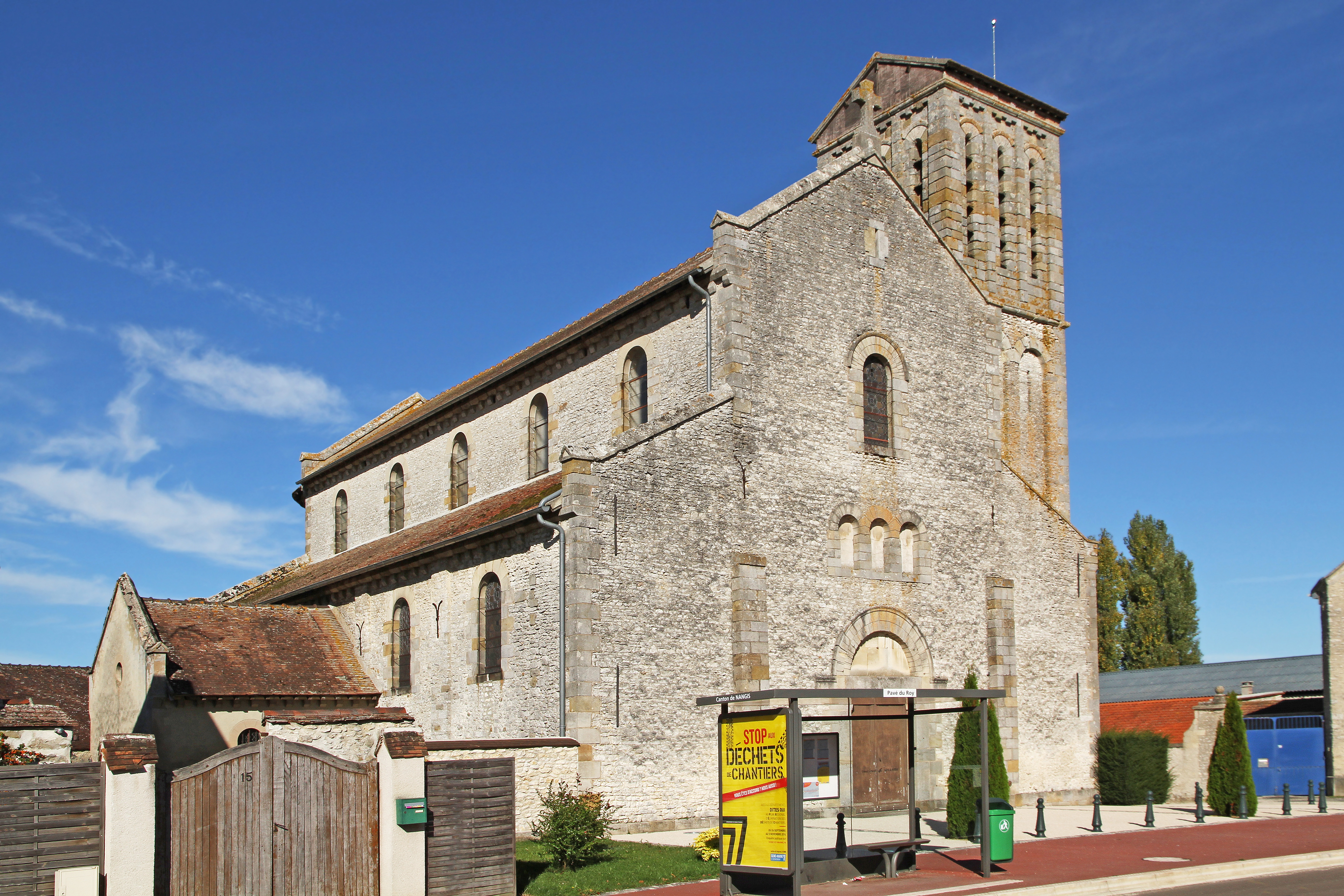
- The church in Maison-Rouge

- Coat of arms
- Location of Maison-Rouge
- Location within France Location within Île-de-France (region)
- Coordinates: 48°33′34″N 3°09′05″E
- Country: France
- Region: Île-de-France
- Department: Seine-et-Marne
- Arrondissement: Provins
- Canton: Provins
- Intercommunality: Provinois

Government
  - Mayor (2020–2026): Pierre Caumartin
- Area^{1}: 13.91 km^{2} (5.37 sq mi)
- Highest elevation: 155 m (509 ft)
- Lowest elevation: 105 m (344 ft)
- Population (2023): 880
  - Density: 63/km^{2} (160/sq mi)
- Time zone: UTC+01:00 (CET)
  - Summer (DST): UTC+02:00 (CEST)
- INSEE/Postal code: 77272 /77370
- ^{1} French Land Register data, which excludes lakes, ponds, glaciers > 1 km^{2} (0.386 sq mi or 247 acres) and river estuaries.

Maison-Rouge (French pronunciation: [mɛzɔ̃ ʁuʒ], literally Red House) is a commune in the Seine-et-Marne department in the Île-de-France region in north-central France.

== Demographics ==
Inhabitants are called Mansyrubiens.

== See also ==
- Communes of the Seine-et-Marne department
