= Boisdon =

- Commune
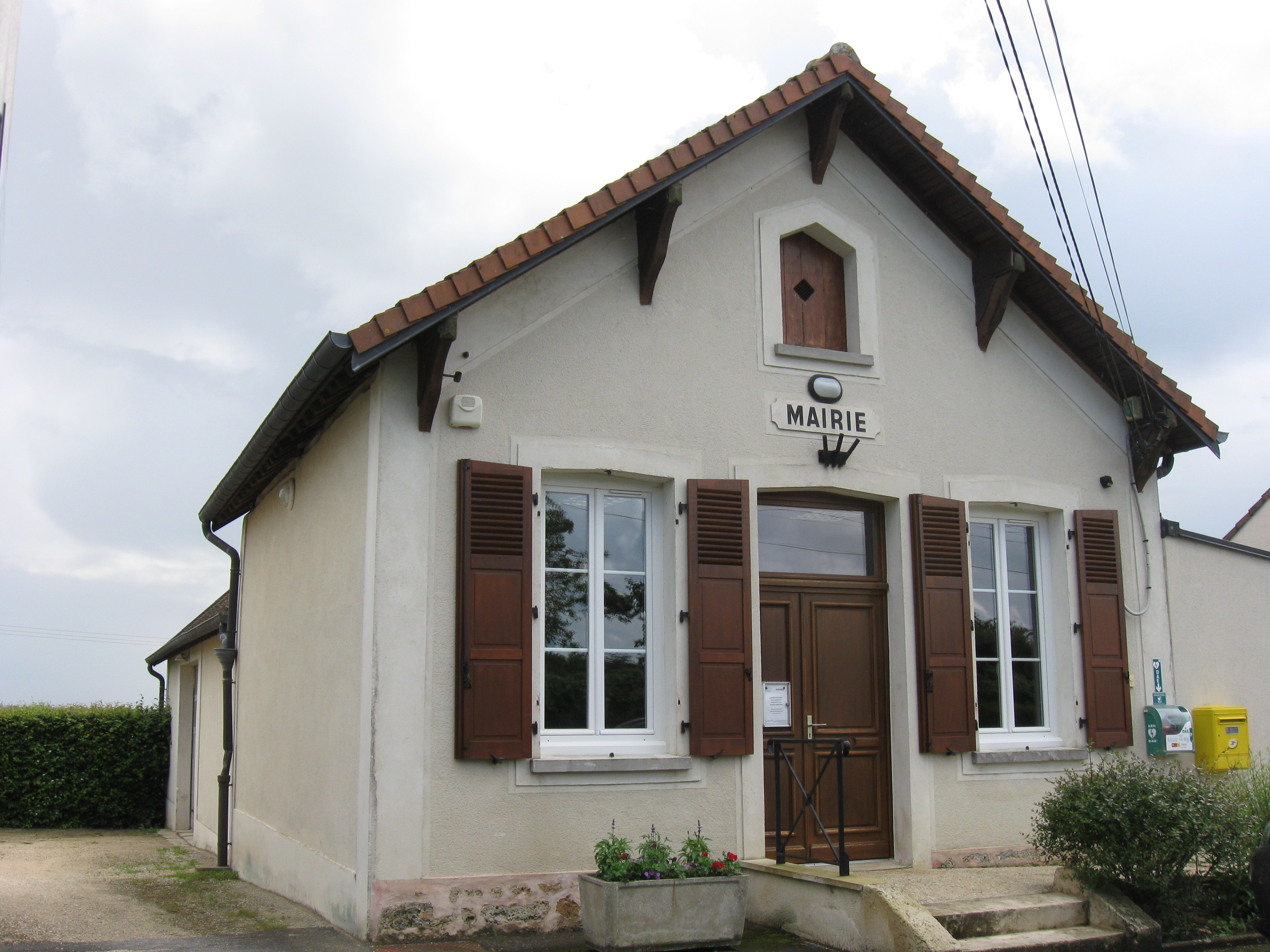
- The town hall in Boisdon
- Location of Boisdon
- Location within France Location within Île-de-France (region)
- Coordinates: 48°41′08″N 3°13′32″E
- Country: France
- Region: Île-de-France
- Department: Seine-et-Marne
- Arrondissement: Provins
- Canton: Provins
- Intercommunality: CC Provinois

Government
  - Mayor (2020–2026): Fabien Pernel
- Area^{1}: 4.30 km^{2} (1.66 sq mi)
- Highest elevation: 164 m (538 ft)
- Lowest elevation: 143 m (469 ft)
- Population (2023): 131
  - Density: 30.5/km^{2} (78.9/sq mi)
- Time zone: UTC+01:00 (CET)
  - Summer (DST): UTC+02:00 (CEST)
- INSEE/Postal code: 77036 /77970
- ^{1} French Land Register data, which excludes lakes, ponds, glaciers > 1 km^{2} (0.386 sq mi or 247 acres) and river estuaries.

Boisdon (French pronunciation: [bwadɔ̃]) is a commune located in the Seine-et-Marne department in the Île-de-France region in north-central France.

== See also ==
- Communes of the Seine-et-Marne department
