= Vulaines-lès-Provins =

- Commune
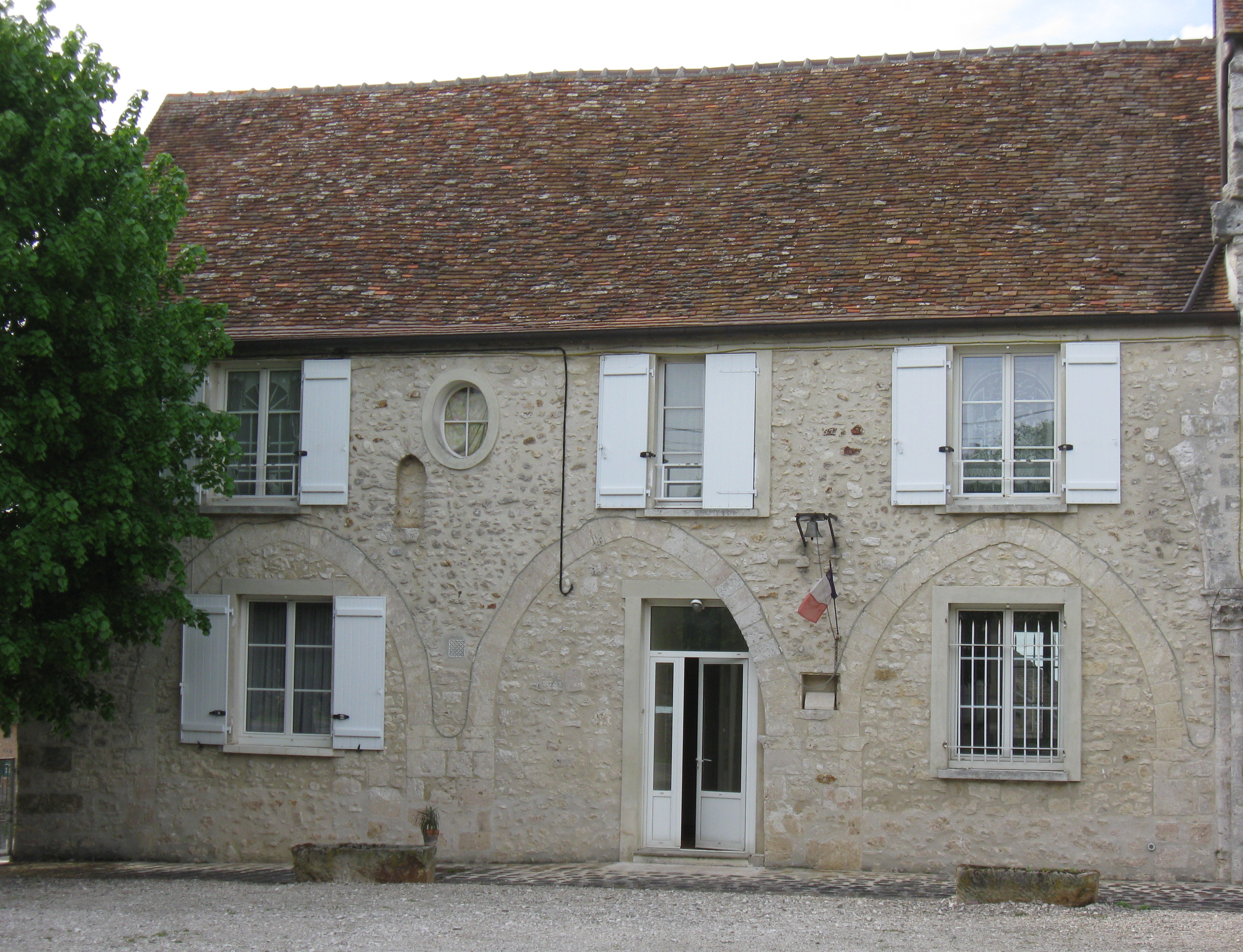
- The town hall in Vulaines-lès-Provins
- Location of Vulaines-lès-Provins
- Location within France Location within Île-de-France (region)
- Coordinates: 48°33′35″N 3°13′08″E
- Country: France
- Region: Île-de-France
- Department: Seine-et-Marne
- Arrondissement: Provins
- Canton: Provins
- Intercommunality: Provinois

Government
  - Mayor (2020–2026): Bertrand De Bisschop
- Area^{1}: 10.75 km^{2} (4.15 sq mi)
- Highest elevation: 154 m (505 ft)
- Lowest elevation: 100 m (330 ft)
- Population (2023): 80
  - Density: 7.4/km^{2} (19/sq mi)
- Time zone: UTC+01:00 (CET)
  - Summer (DST): UTC+02:00 (CEST)
- INSEE/Postal code: 77532 /77160
- ^{1} French Land Register data, which excludes lakes, ponds, glaciers > 1 km^{2} (0.386 sq mi or 247 acres) and river estuaries.

Vulaines-lès-Provins (French pronunciation: [vylɛn lɛ pʁɔvɛ̃], literally Vulaines near Provins) is a commune in the Seine-et-Marne department in the Île-de-France region in north-central France.

== Population ==
Historical population
Year	Pop.	±% p.a.
1968	130	—
1975	100	−3.68%
1982	90	−1.49%
1990	51	−6.85%
1999	67	+3.08%
2007	61	−1.17%
2012	69	+2.50%
2017	64	−1.49%
2023	80	+3.79%
Source: INSEE

== See also ==
- Communes of the Seine-et-Marne department
