= Communauté de communes du Provinois =

Federation of municipalities in France

Coordinates: 48.56°N 3.30°E

Provinois
- Communauté de communes
- Country: France
- Region: Île-de-France
- Department: Seine-et-Marne
- No. of communes: {{{nbcomm}}}
- Established: August 2003

Government
  - President: Olivier Lavenka
- Area: 628.5 km^{2} (242.7 sq mi)
- Population (2018): 34,587
  - Density: 55.03/km^{2} (142.5/sq mi)
- Website: www.cc-du-provinois.fr

The Communauté de communes du Provinois is a federation of municipalities (communauté de communes) in the Seine-et-Marne département and in the Île-de-France région of France. Its seat is Provins. Its area is 628.5 km^{2}, and its population was 34,587 in 2018, of which 12,000 in Provins.

== Composition ==
Since 2013, when it absorbed the former Communauté de communes de la GERBE and the commune Chalautre-la-Grande, the Communauté de communes du Provinois includes 39 communes:

1. Augers-en-Brie
2. Bannost-Villegagnon
3. Beauchery-Saint-Martin
4. Beton-Bazoches
5. Bezalles
6. Boisdon
7. Cerneux
8. Chalautre-la-Grande
9. Chalautre-la-Petite
10. Champcenest
11. La Chapelle-Saint-Sulpice
12. Chenoise-Cucharmoy
13. Courchamp
14. Courtacon
15. Frétoy
16. Jouy-le-Châtel
17. Léchelle
18. Longueville
19. Louan-Villegruis-Fontaine
20. Maison-Rouge
21. Les Marêts
22. Melz-sur-Seine
23. Montceaux-lès-Provins
24. Mortery
25. Poigny
26. Provins
27. Rouilly
28. Rupéreux
29. Saint-Brice
30. Sainte-Colombe
31. Saint-Hilliers
32. Saint-Loup-de-Naud
33. Saint-Martin-du-Boschet
34. Sancy-lès-Provins
35. Soisy-Bouy
36. Sourdun
37. Villiers-Saint-Georges
38. Voulton
39. Vulaines-lès-Provins

== See also ==
- Communes of the Seine-et-Marne department
