= Beauchery-Saint-Martin =

- Commune
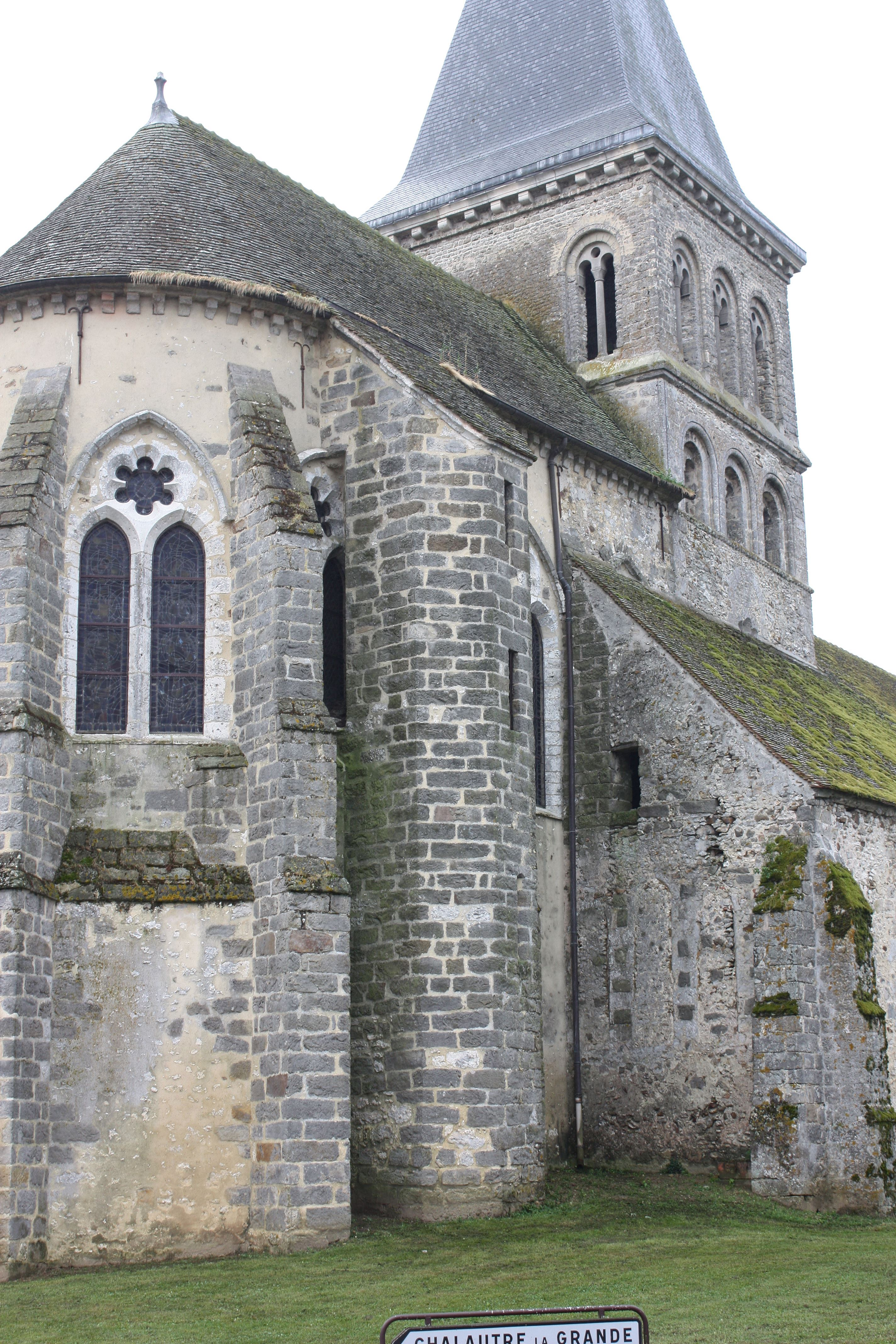
- The church in Beauchery-Saint-Martin
- Location of Beauchery-Saint-Martin
- Location within France Location within Île-de-France (region)
- Coordinates: 48°36′54″N 3°24′15″E
- Country: France
- Region: Île-de-France
- Department: Seine-et-Marne
- Arrondissement: Provins
- Canton: Provins
- Intercommunality: CC Provinois

Government
  - Mayor (2020–2026): Claire Crapart
- Area^{1}: 27.96 km^{2} (10.80 sq mi)
- Highest elevation: 172 m (564 ft)
- Lowest elevation: 138 m (453 ft)
- Population (2023): 384
  - Density: 13.7/km^{2} (35.6/sq mi)
- Time zone: UTC+01:00 (CET)
  - Summer (DST): UTC+02:00 (CEST)
- INSEE/Postal code: 77026 /77560
- ^{1} French Land Register data, which excludes lakes, ponds, glaciers > 1 km^{2} (0.386 sq mi or 247 acres) and river estuaries.

Beauchery-Saint-Martin (French pronunciation: [boʃʁi sɛ̃ maʁtɛ̃]) is a commune in the Seine-et-Marne department in the Île-de-France region in north-central France. It was created in 1973 by the merger of two former communes: Beauchery and Saint-Martin-Chennetron.

== See also ==
- Communes of the Seine-et-Marne department
