= Sancy-lès-Provins =

- Commune
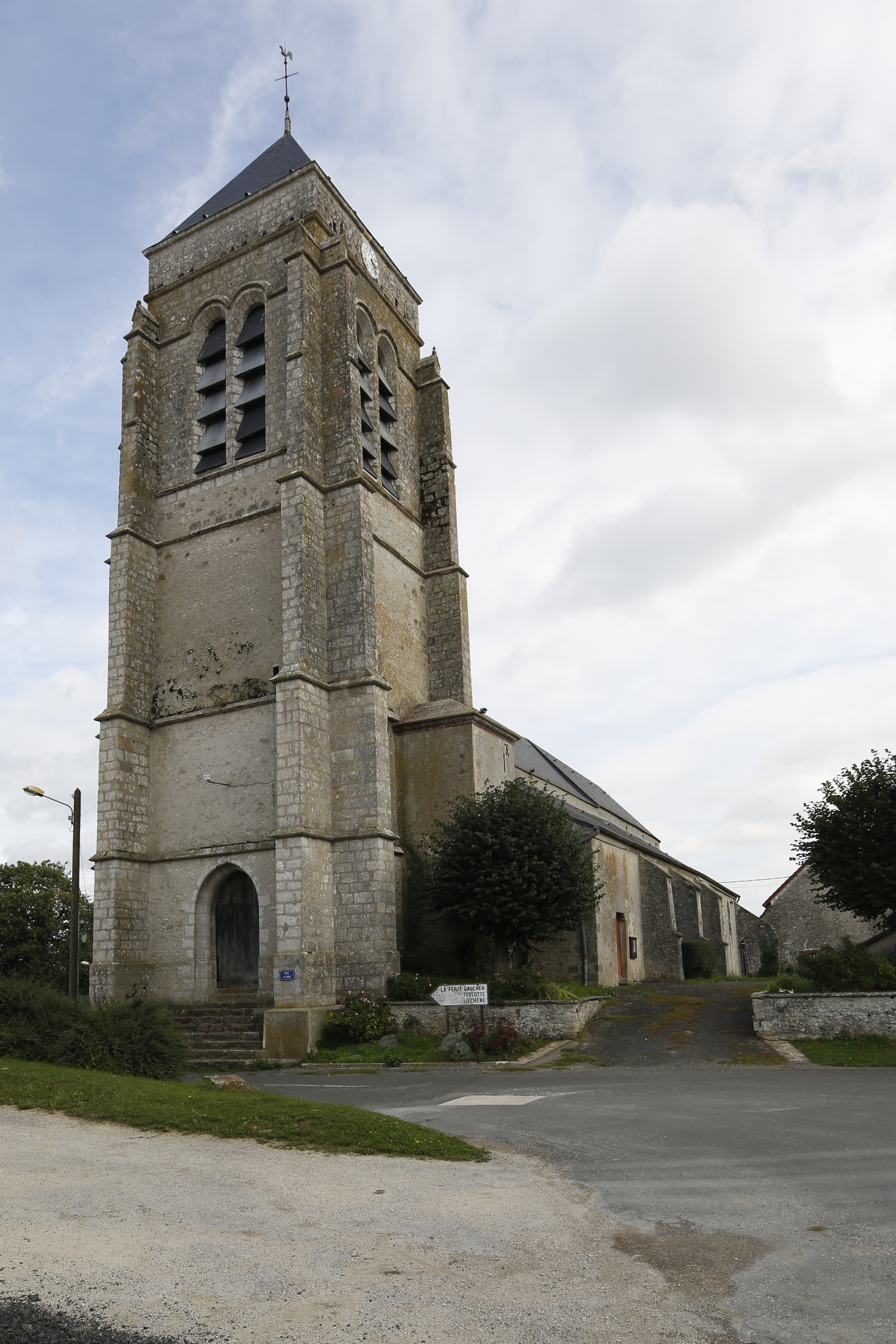
- The church in Sancy-lès-Provins
- Location of Sancy-lès-Provins
- Location within France Location within Île-de-France (region)
- Coordinates: 48°41′47″N 3°23′40″E
- Country: France
- Region: Île-de-France
- Department: Seine-et-Marne
- Arrondissement: Provins
- Canton: Provins
- Intercommunality: Provinois

Government
  - Mayor (2020–2026): Yvette Galand
- Area^{1}: 18.21 km^{2} (7.03 sq mi)
- Highest elevation: 200 m (660 ft)
- Lowest elevation: 144 m (472 ft)
- Population (2023): 339
  - Density: 18.6/km^{2} (48.2/sq mi)
- Time zone: UTC+01:00 (CET)
  - Summer (DST): UTC+02:00 (CEST)
- INSEE/Postal code: 77444 /77320
- ^{1} French Land Register data, which excludes lakes, ponds, glaciers > 1 km^{2} (0.386 sq mi or 247 acres) and river estuaries.

Sancy-lès-Provins (French pronunciation: [sɑ̃si lɛ pʁɔvɛ̃], literally Sancy near Provins) is a commune in the Seine-et-Marne department in the Île-de-France region in north-central France.

== See also ==
- Communes of the Seine-et-Marne department
