= Saint-Hilliers =

- Commune
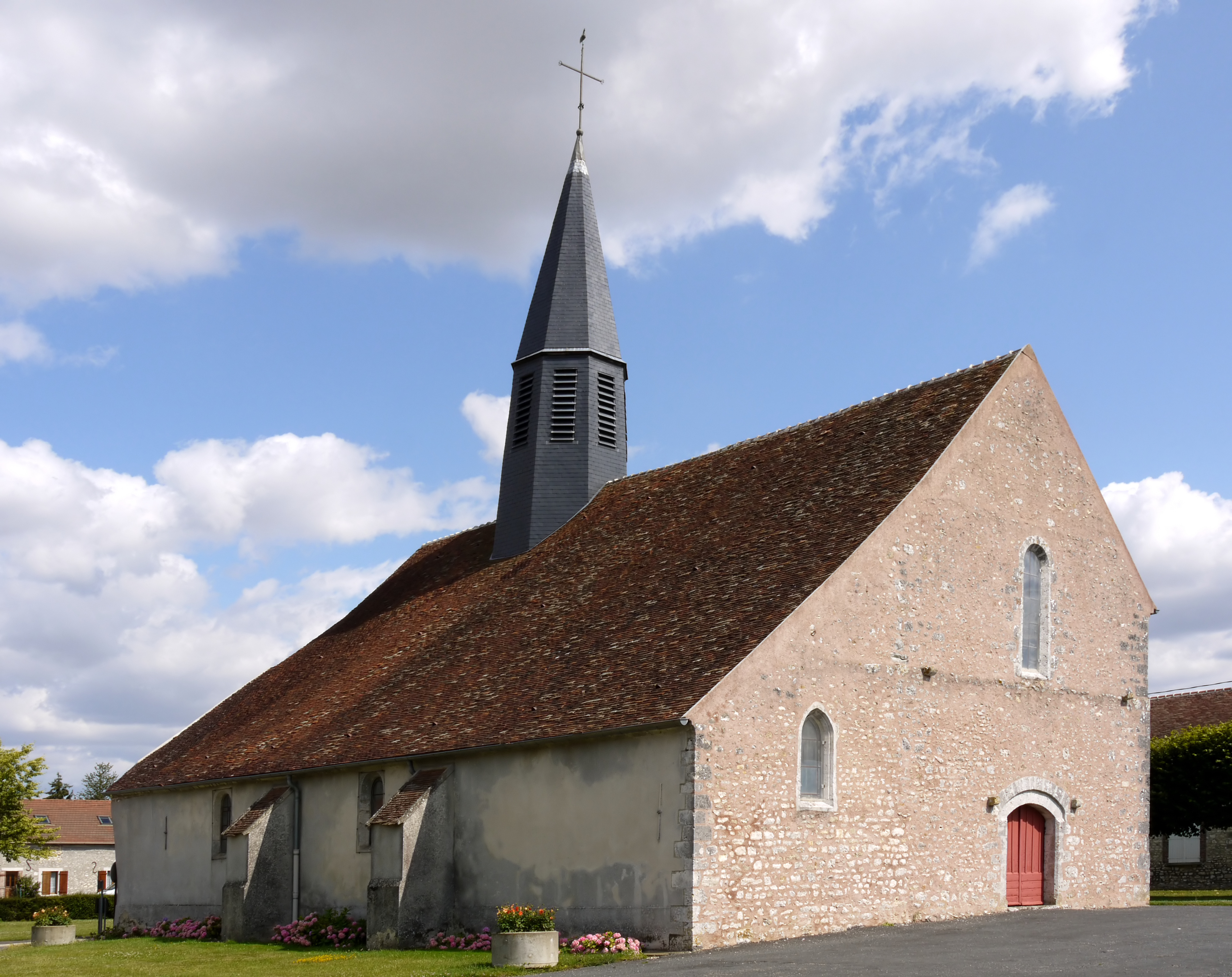
- The church in Saint-Hilliers
- Location of Saint-Hilliers
- Location within France Location within Île-de-France (region)
- Coordinates: 48°37′15″N 3°15′23″E
- Country: France
- Region: Île-de-France
- Department: Seine-et-Marne
- Arrondissement: Provins
- Canton: Provins
- Intercommunality: CC Provinois

Government
  - Mayor (2020–2026): Catherine Gallois
- Area^{1}: 19.13 km^{2} (7.39 sq mi)
- Highest elevation: 176 m (577 ft)
- Lowest elevation: 136 m (446 ft)
- Population (2023): 474
  - Density: 24.8/km^{2} (64.2/sq mi)
- Time zone: UTC+01:00 (CET)
  - Summer (DST): UTC+02:00 (CEST)
- INSEE/Postal code: 77414 /77160
- ^{1} French Land Register data, which excludes lakes, ponds, glaciers > 1 km^{2} (0.386 sq mi or 247 acres) and river estuaries.

Saint-Hilliers (French pronunciation: [sɛ̃.t‿ilje]) is a commune in the Seine-et-Marne department in the Île-de-France region in north-central France.

== Demographics ==
Inhabitants of Saint-Hilliers are called Hilériens.

== See also ==
- Communes of the Seine-et-Marne department
