= Saint-Martin-du-Boschet =

- Commune
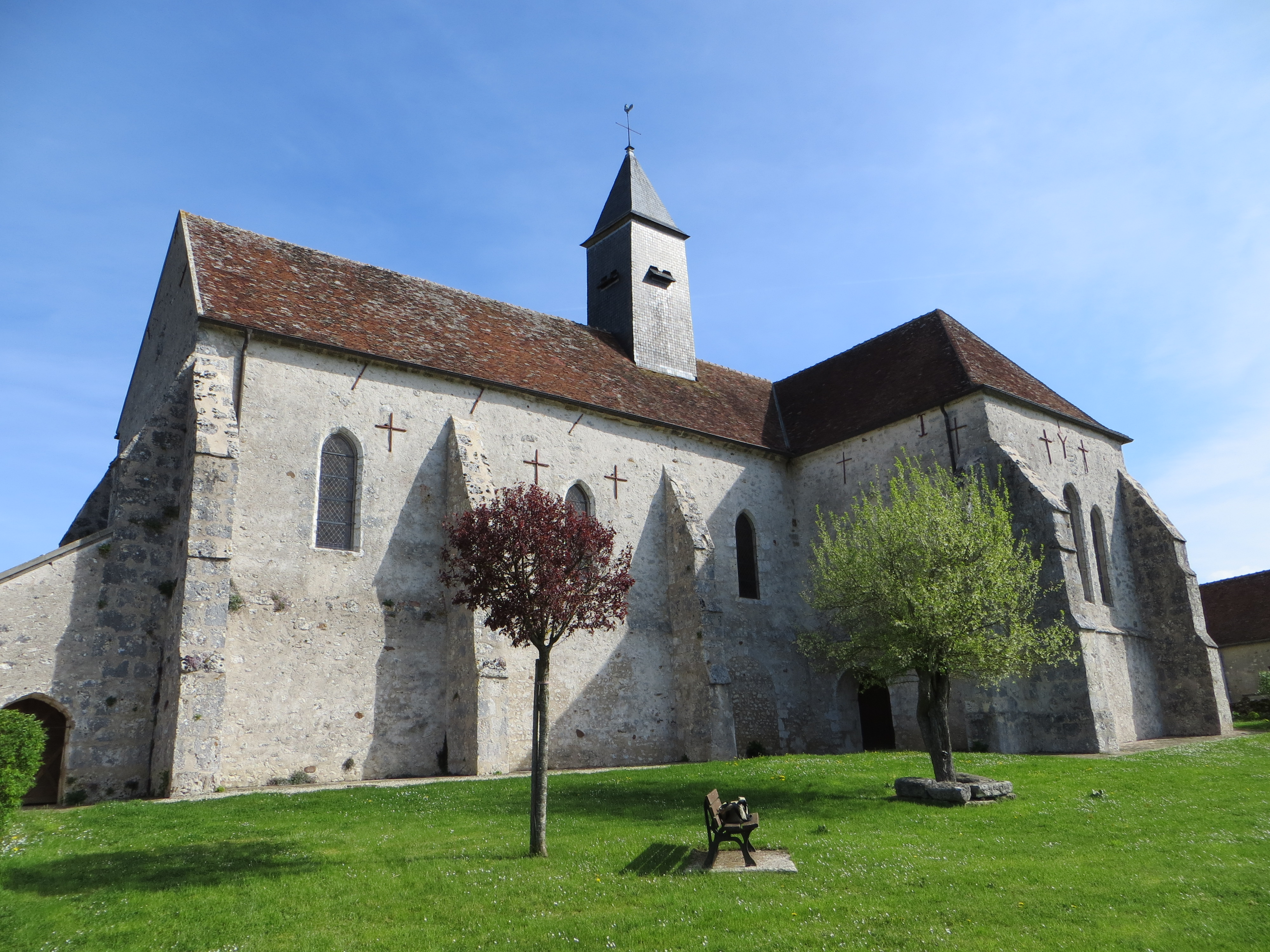
- The church in Saint-Martin-du-Boschet

- Coat of arms
- Location of Saint-Martin-du-Boschet
- Location within France Location within Île-de-France (region)
- Coordinates: 48°44′09″N 3°25′41″E
- Country: France
- Region: Île-de-France
- Department: Seine-et-Marne
- Arrondissement: Provins
- Canton: Provins
- Intercommunality: Provinois

Government
  - Mayor (2020–2026): Christophe Lefèvre
- Area^{1}: 17.06 km^{2} (6.59 sq mi)
- Highest elevation: 201 m (659 ft)
- Lowest elevation: 143 m (469 ft)
- Population (2023): 257
  - Density: 15.1/km^{2} (39.0/sq mi)
- Time zone: UTC+01:00 (CET)
  - Summer (DST): UTC+02:00 (CEST)
- INSEE/Postal code: 77424 /77320
- ^{1} French Land Register data, which excludes lakes, ponds, glaciers > 1 km^{2} (0.386 sq mi or 247 acres) and river estuaries.

Saint-Martin-du-Boschet (French pronunciation: [sɛ̃ maʁtɛ̃ dy bɔʃɛ]) is a commune in the Seine-et-Marne department in the Île-de-France region in north-central France.

== See also ==
- Communes of the Seine-et-Marne department
