= Melz-sur-Seine =

- Commune
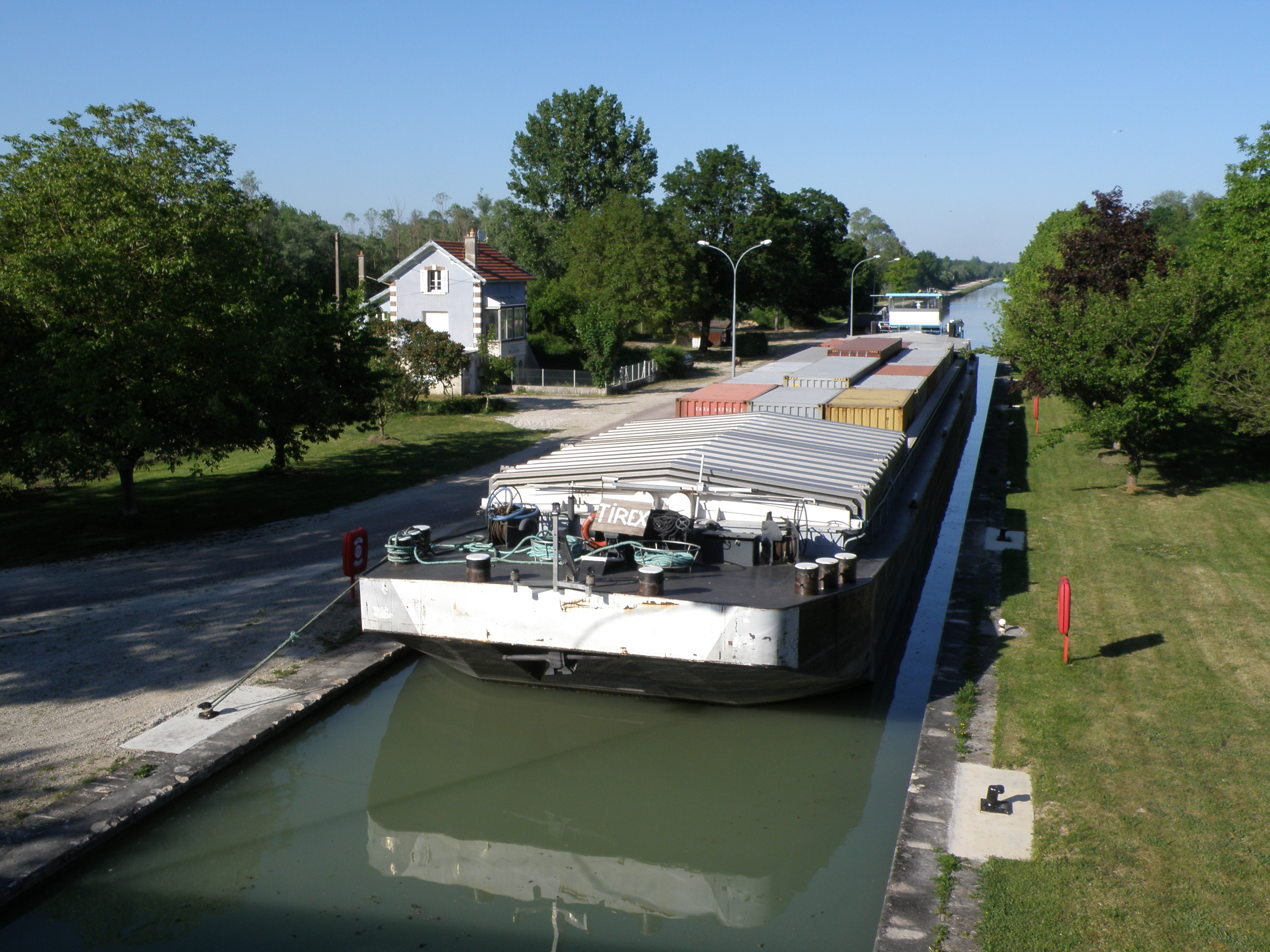
- The canal lock in Melz-sur-Seine
- Location of Melz-sur-Seine
- Location within France Location within Île-de-France (region)
- Coordinates: 48°29′53″N 3°25′05″E
- Country: France
- Region: Île-de-France
- Department: Seine-et-Marne
- Arrondissement: Provins
- Canton: Provins
- Intercommunality: CC Provinois

Government
  - Mayor (2022–2026): Laure Masson
- Area^{1}: 18.50 km^{2} (7.14 sq mi)
- Highest elevation: 172 m (564 ft)
- Lowest elevation: 58 m (190 ft)
- Population (2023): 345
  - Density: 18.6/km^{2} (48.3/sq mi)
- Demonym: Melziens
- Time zone: UTC+01:00 (CET)
  - Summer (DST): UTC+02:00 (CEST)
- INSEE/Postal code: 77289 /77171
- ^{1} French Land Register data, which excludes lakes, ponds, glaciers > 1 km^{2} (0.386 sq mi or 247 acres) and river estuaries.

Melz-sur-Seine (French pronunciation: [mɛlzsyʁsɛn]; lit. 'Melz-on-Seine') is a rural commune in the Seine-et-Marne department in the Île-de-France region in north-central France. It is on the departmental border with Aube, which is also the regional border with Grand Est.

== Demonym ==
Inhabitants of Melz-sur-Seine are called Melziens (masculine) and Melziennes (feminine) in French.

== See also ==
- Communes of the Seine-et-Marne department
