= Mortery =

- Commune
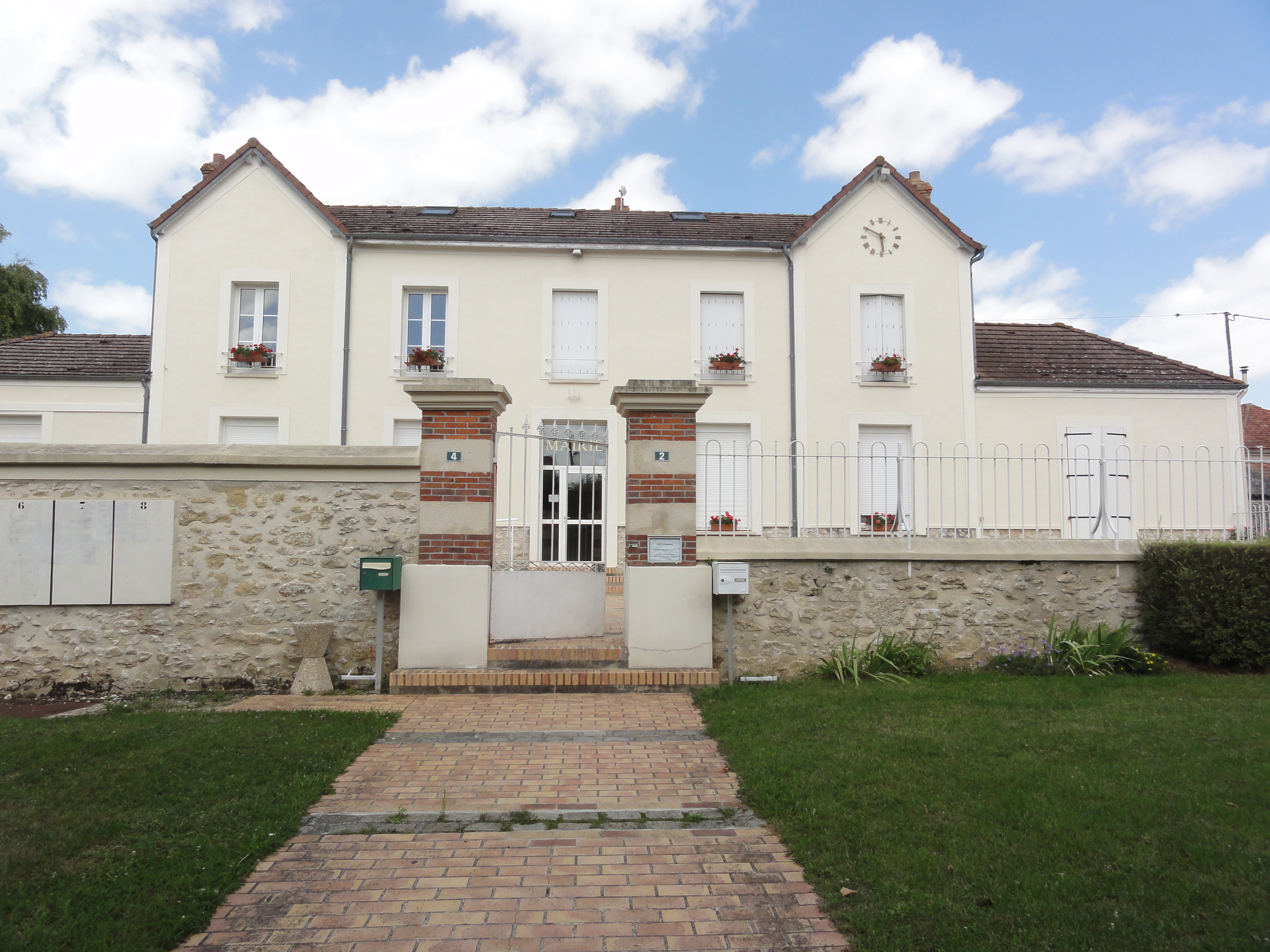
- The town hall in Mortery
- Location of Mortery
- Location within France Location within Île-de-France (region)
- Coordinates: 48°35′57″N 3°15′40″E
- Country: France
- Region: Île-de-France
- Department: Seine-et-Marne
- Arrondissement: Provins
- Canton: Provins
- Intercommunality: CC Provinois

Government
  - Mayor (2020–2026): Xavier Bouvrain
- Area^{1}: 13.20 km^{2} (5.10 sq mi)
- Highest elevation: 148 m (486 ft)
- Lowest elevation: 103 m (338 ft)
- Population (2023): 137
  - Density: 10.4/km^{2} (26.9/sq mi)
- Time zone: UTC+01:00 (CET)
  - Summer (DST): UTC+02:00 (CEST)
- INSEE/Postal code: 77319 /77160
- ^{1} French Land Register data, which excludes lakes, ponds, glaciers > 1 km^{2} (0.386 sq mi or 247 acres) and river estuaries.

Mortery (French pronunciation: [mɔʁtəʁi]) is a commune in the Seine-et-Marne department in the Île-de-France region in north-central France.

== Demographics ==
Inhabitants are called Morterois.

== See also ==
- Communes of the Seine-et-Marne department
