= Chalautre-la-Petite =

- Commune
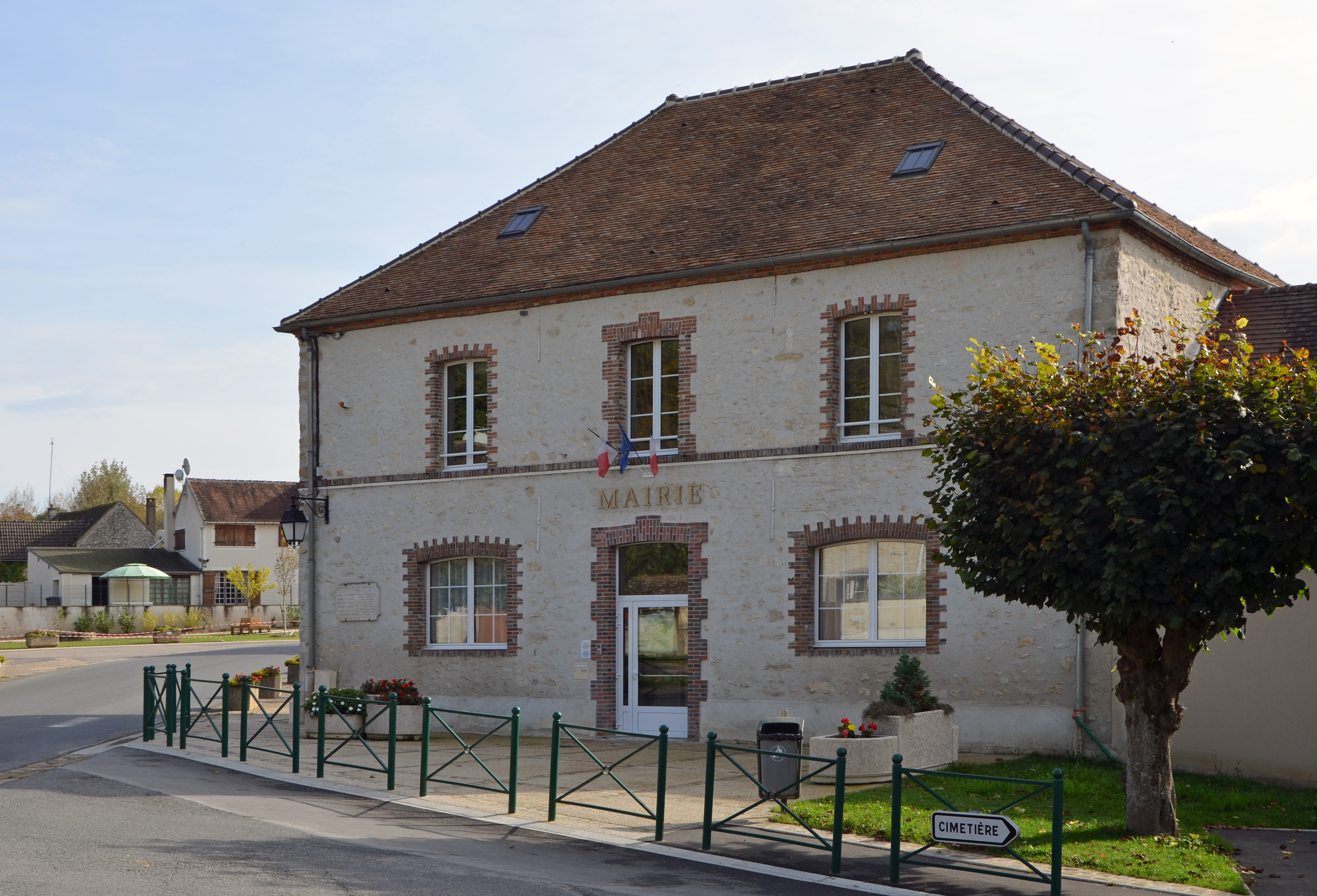
- The town hall in Chalautre-la-Petite
- Location of Chalautre-la-Petite
- Location within France Location within Île-de-France (region)
- Coordinates: 48°31′41″N 3°18′53″E
- Country: France
- Region: Île-de-France
- Department: Seine-et-Marne
- Arrondissement: Provins
- Canton: Provins
- Intercommunality: CC Provinois

Government
  - Mayor (2020–2026): Chantal Bellache
- Area^{1}: 9.37 km^{2} (3.62 sq mi)
- Highest elevation: 161 m (528 ft)
- Lowest elevation: 71 m (233 ft)
- Population (2023): 541
  - Density: 57.7/km^{2} (150/sq mi)
- Time zone: UTC+01:00 (CET)
  - Summer (DST): UTC+02:00 (CEST)
- INSEE/Postal code: 77073 /77160
- ^{1} French Land Register data, which excludes lakes, ponds, glaciers > 1 km^{2} (0.386 sq mi or 247 acres) and river estuaries.

Chalautre-la-Petite (French pronunciation: [ʃalotʁ la pətit]) is a commune in the Seine-et-Marne department in the Île-de-France region in north-central France.

== Demographics ==
The inhabitants are called Chalautriers.

== See also ==
- Communes of the Seine-et-Marne department
