= Champcenest =

- Commune
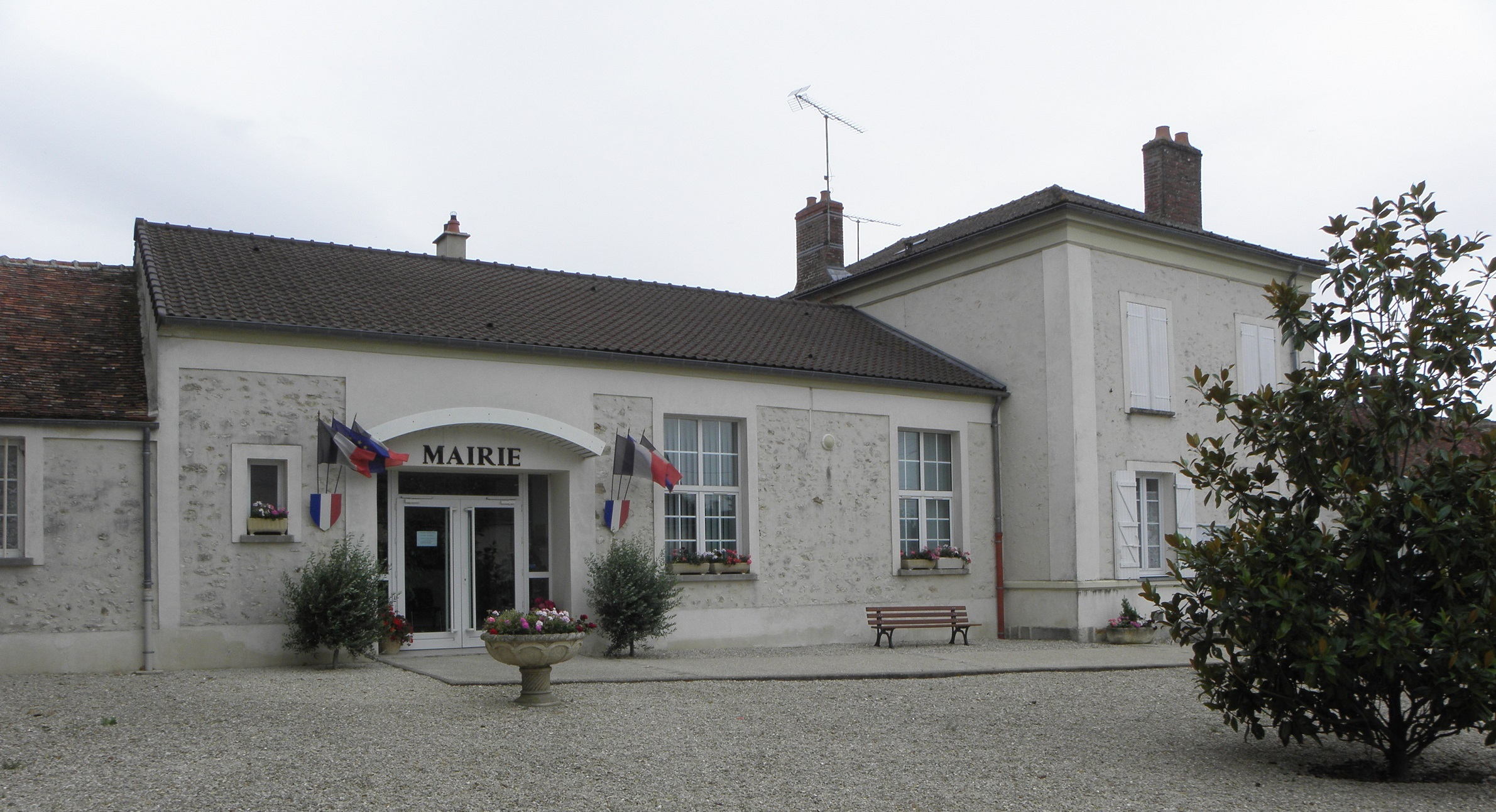
- The town hall in Champcenest

- Coat of arms
- Location of Champcenest
- Location within France Location within Île-de-France (region)
- Coordinates: 48°40′13″N 3°17′00″E
- Country: France
- Region: Île-de-France
- Department: Seine-et-Marne
- Arrondissement: Provins
- Canton: Provins
- Intercommunality: CC Provinois

Government
  - Mayor (2020–2026): Catherine Perrin
- Area^{1}: 12.46 km^{2} (4.81 sq mi)
- Highest elevation: 173 m (568 ft)
- Lowest elevation: 142 m (466 ft)
- Population (2023): 205
  - Density: 16.5/km^{2} (42.6/sq mi)
- Time zone: UTC+01:00 (CET)
  - Summer (DST): UTC+02:00 (CEST)
- INSEE/Postal code: 77080 /77560
- ^{1} French Land Register data, which excludes lakes, ponds, glaciers > 1 km^{2} (0.386 sq mi or 247 acres) and river estuaries.

Champcenest (French pronunciation: [ʃɑ̃sənɛ]) is a commune in the Seine-et-Marne department in the Île-de-France region in north-central France.

== See also ==
- Communes of the Seine-et-Marne department
