= Rouilly =

- Commune
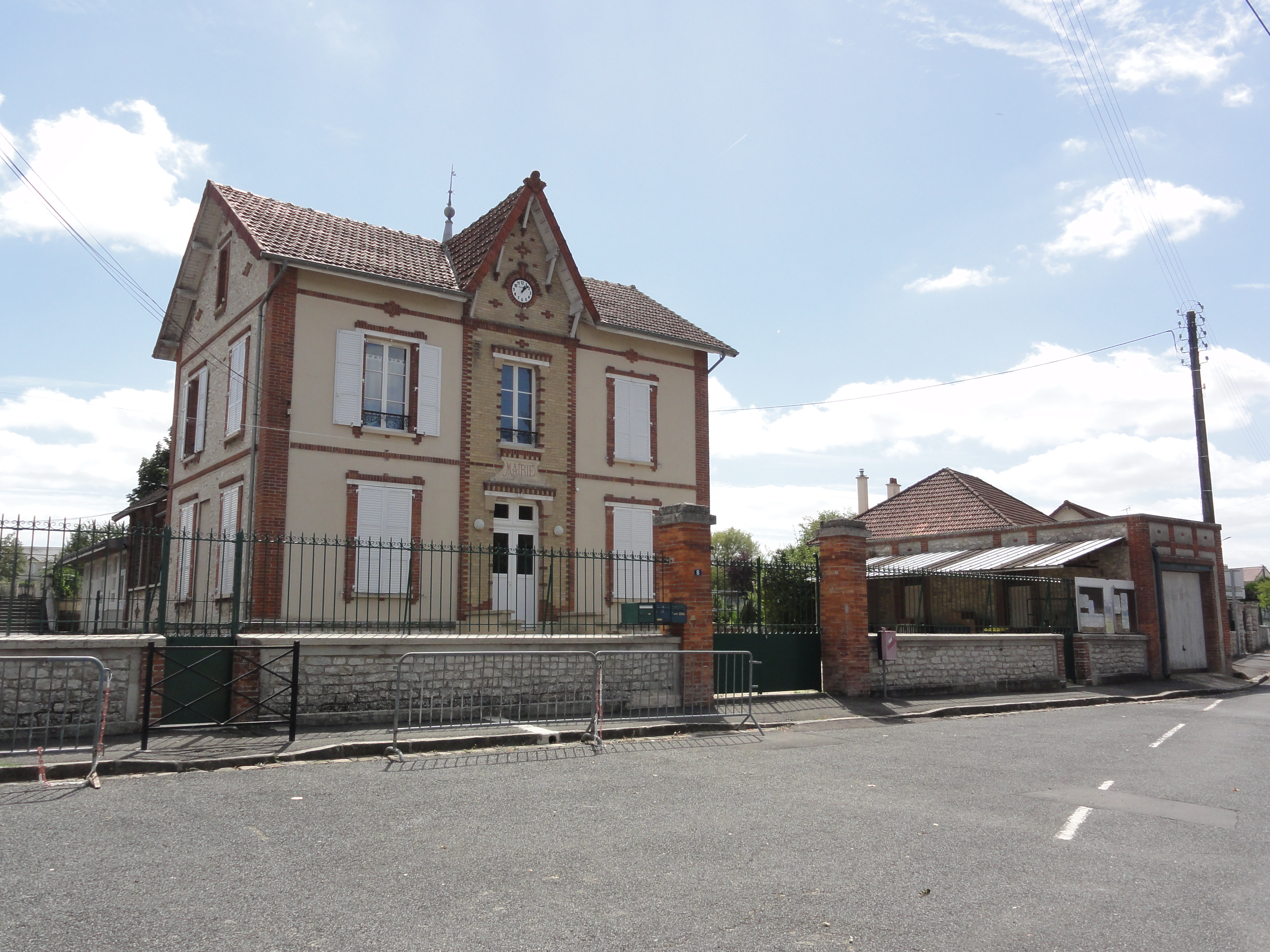
- The town hall in Rouilly
- Location of Rouilly
- Location within France Location within Île-de-France (region)
- Coordinates: 48°35′32″N 3°16′41″E
- Country: France
- Region: Île-de-France
- Department: Seine-et-Marne
- Arrondissement: Provins
- Canton: Provins
- Intercommunality: CC Provinois

Government
  - Mayor (2020–2026): Pierre Voisembert
- Area^{1}: 7.62 km^{2} (2.94 sq mi)
- Highest elevation: 170 m (560 ft)
- Lowest elevation: 94 m (308 ft)
- Population (2023): 496
  - Density: 65.1/km^{2} (169/sq mi)
- Time zone: UTC+01:00 (CET)
  - Summer (DST): UTC+02:00 (CEST)
- INSEE/Postal code: 77391 /77160
- ^{1} French Land Register data, which excludes lakes, ponds, glaciers > 1 km^{2} (0.386 sq mi or 247 acres) and river estuaries.

Rouilly (French pronunciation: [ʁuji]) is a commune in the Seine-et-Marne department in the Île-de-France region in north-central France.

== See also ==
- Communes of the Seine-et-Marne department
