= Voulton =

- Commune
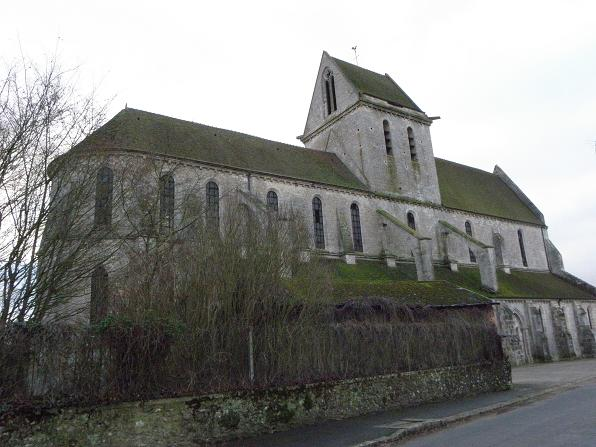
- The church in Voulton
- Location of Voulton
- Location within France Location within Île-de-France (region)
- Coordinates: 48°37′06″N 3°20′03″E
- Country: France
- Region: Île-de-France
- Department: Seine-et-Marne
- Arrondissement: Provins
- Canton: Provins
- Intercommunality: Provinois

Government
  - Mayor (2020–2026): Jacques Simony
- Area^{1}: 26.29 km^{2} (10.15 sq mi)
- Highest elevation: 181 m (594 ft)
- Lowest elevation: 143 m (469 ft)
- Population (2023): 295
  - Density: 11.2/km^{2} (29.1/sq mi)
- Time zone: UTC+01:00 (CET)
  - Summer (DST): UTC+02:00 (CEST)
- INSEE/Postal code: 77530 /77560
- ^{1} French Land Register data, which excludes lakes, ponds, glaciers > 1 km^{2} (0.386 sq mi or 247 acres) and river estuaries.

Voulton (French pronunciation: [vultɔ̃]) is a commune in the Seine-et-Marne department in the Île-de-France region in north-central France.

== Demographics ==
Inhabitants of Voulton are called Voultonais.

== See also ==
- Communes of the Seine-et-Marne department
