= Sourdun =

- Commune
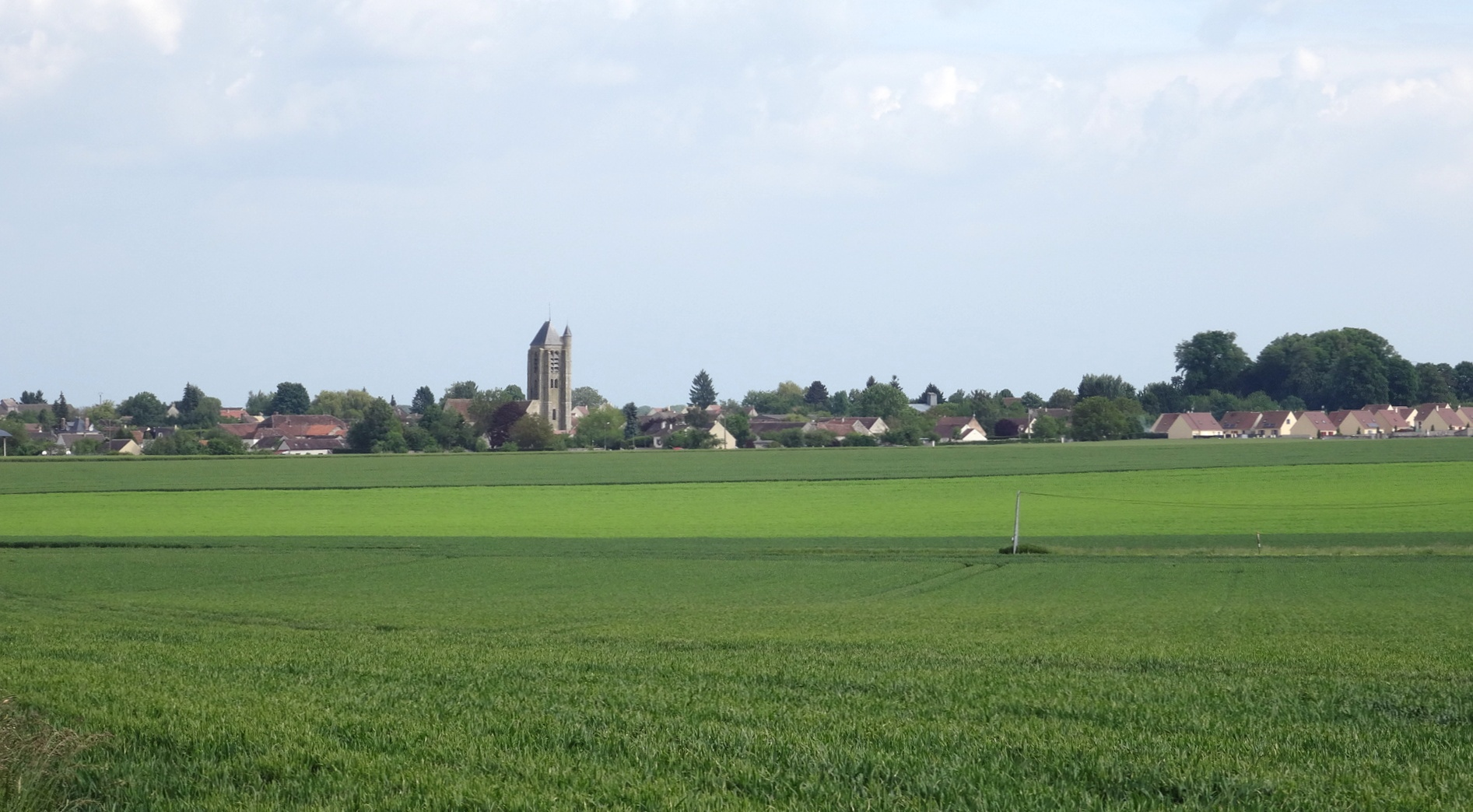
- A general view of Sourdun

- Coat of arms
- Location of Sourdun
- Location within France Location within Île-de-France (region)
- Coordinates: 48°32′13″N 3°20′54″E
- Country: France
- Region: Île-de-France
- Department: Seine-et-Marne
- Arrondissement: Provins
- Canton: Provins
- Intercommunality: Provinois

Government
  - Mayor (2020–2026): Eric Torpier
- Area^{1}: 23.33 km^{2} (9.01 sq mi)
- Highest elevation: 173 m (568 ft)
- Lowest elevation: 92 m (302 ft)
- Population (2023): 1,541
  - Density: 66.05/km^{2} (171.1/sq mi)
- Time zone: UTC+01:00 (CET)
  - Summer (DST): UTC+02:00 (CEST)
- INSEE/Postal code: 77459 /77171
- ^{1} French Land Register data, which excludes lakes, ponds, glaciers > 1 km^{2} (0.386 sq mi or 247 acres) and river estuaries.

Sourdun (French pronunciation: [suʁdœ̃]) is a commune in the Seine-et-Marne department in the Île-de-France region in north-central France.

== Demographics ==
Inhabitants of Sourdun are called Sourdunois.

== See also ==
- Communes of the Seine-et-Marne department
