= Courchamp =

- Commune
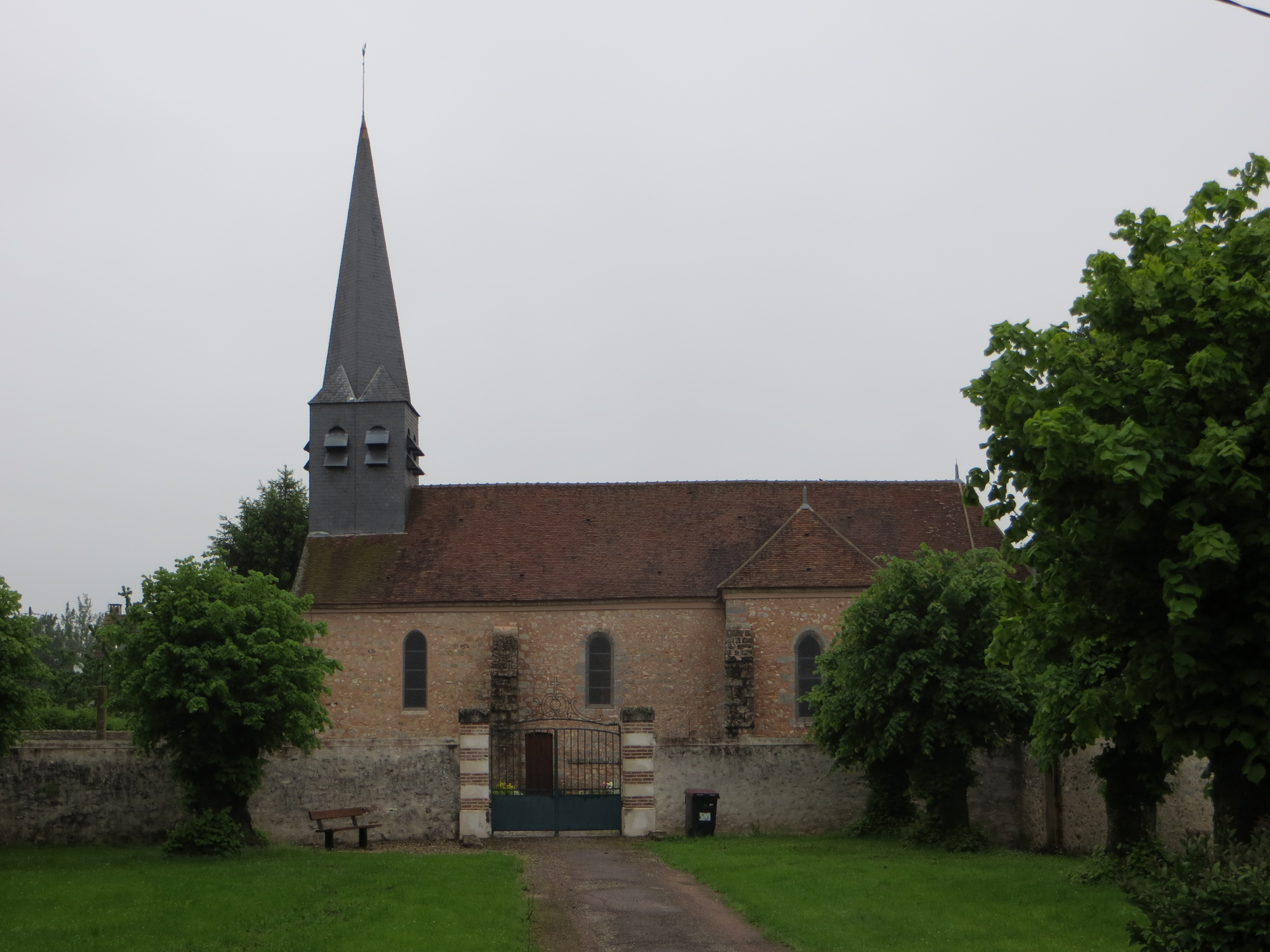
- The church in Courchamp
- Location of Courchamp
- Location within France Location within Île-de-France (region)
- Coordinates: 48°38′16″N 3°17′14″E
- Country: France
- Region: Île-de-France
- Department: Seine-et-Marne
- Arrondissement: Provins
- Canton: Provins
- Intercommunality: CC Provinois

Government
  - Mayor (2020–2026): Christine Boulet
- Area^{1}: 12.41 km^{2} (4.79 sq mi)
- Highest elevation: 176 m (577 ft)
- Lowest elevation: 151 m (495 ft)
- Population (2023): 151
  - Density: 12.2/km^{2} (31.5/sq mi)
- Time zone: UTC+01:00 (CET)
  - Summer (DST): UTC+02:00 (CEST)
- INSEE/Postal code: 77134 /77560
- ^{1} French Land Register data, which excludes lakes, ponds, glaciers > 1 km^{2} (0.386 sq mi or 247 acres) and river estuaries.

Courchamp (French pronunciation: [kuʁʃɑ̃]) is a commune in the Seine-et-Marne department in the Île-de-France region in north-central France.

== Demographics ==
The inhabitants are called Courchampois.

== See also ==
- Communes of the Seine-et-Marne department
