= La Chapelle-Saint-Sulpice =

- Commune
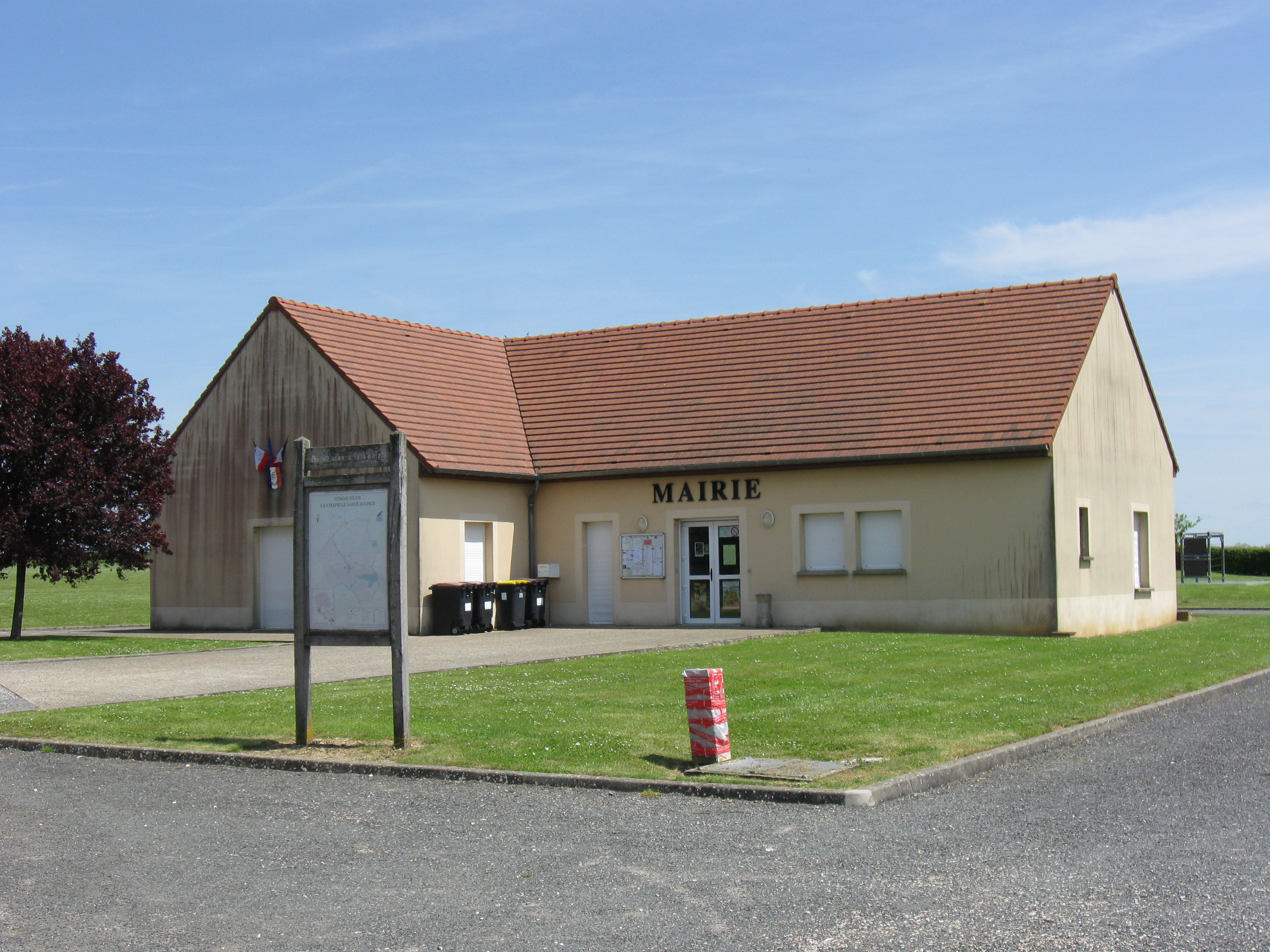
- The town hall in La Chapelle-Saint-Sulpice
- Location of La Chapelle-Saint-Sulpice
- Location within France Location within Île-de-France (region)
- Coordinates: 48°33′18″N 3°10′44″E
- Country: France
- Region: Île-de-France
- Department: Seine-et-Marne
- Arrondissement: Provins
- Canton: Provins
- Intercommunality: CC Provinois

Government
  - Mayor (2020–2026): Bruno Pelliciari
- Area^{1}: 6.37 km^{2} (2.46 sq mi)
- Highest elevation: 151 m (495 ft)
- Lowest elevation: 105 m (344 ft)
- Population (2023): 239
  - Density: 37.5/km^{2} (97.2/sq mi)
- Time zone: UTC+01:00 (CET)
  - Summer (DST): UTC+02:00 (CEST)
- INSEE/Postal code: 77090 /77160
- ^{1} French Land Register data, which excludes lakes, ponds, glaciers > 1 km^{2} (0.386 sq mi or 247 acres) and river estuaries.

La Chapelle-Saint-Sulpice (French pronunciation: [la ʃapɛl sɛ̃ sylpis]) is a commune in the Seine-et-Marne department in the Île-de-France region in north-central France.

== Demographics ==
The inhabitants are called Capélosulpiciens.

== See also ==
- Communes of the Seine-et-Marne department
