= Les Marêts =

- Commune
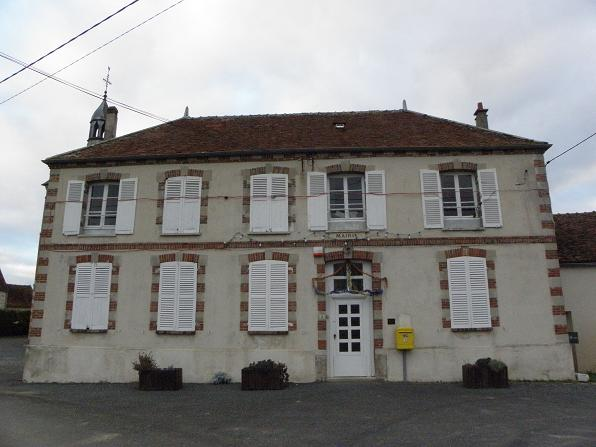
- The town hall in Les Marêts
- Location of Les Marêts
- Location within France Location within Île-de-France (region)
- Coordinates: 48°40′15″N 3°18′48″E
- Country: France
- Region: Île-de-France
- Department: Seine-et-Marne
- Arrondissement: Provins
- Canton: Provins
- Intercommunality: Provinois

Government
  - Mayor (2020–2026): Gérard Cognyl
- Area^{1}: 5.38 km^{2} (2.08 sq mi)
- Highest elevation: 170 m (560 ft)
- Lowest elevation: 136 m (446 ft)
- Population (2023): 152
  - Density: 28.3/km^{2} (73.2/sq mi)
- Time zone: UTC+01:00 (CET)
  - Summer (DST): UTC+02:00 (CEST)
- INSEE/Postal code: 77275 /77560
- ^{1} French Land Register data, which excludes lakes, ponds, glaciers > 1 km^{2} (0.386 sq mi or 247 acres) and river estuaries.

Les Marêts (French pronunciation: [le maʁɛ]) is a commune in the Seine-et-Marne département in the Île-de-France region in north-central France.

== See also ==
- Communes of the Seine-et-Marne department
