= Montceaux-lès-Provins =

- Commune
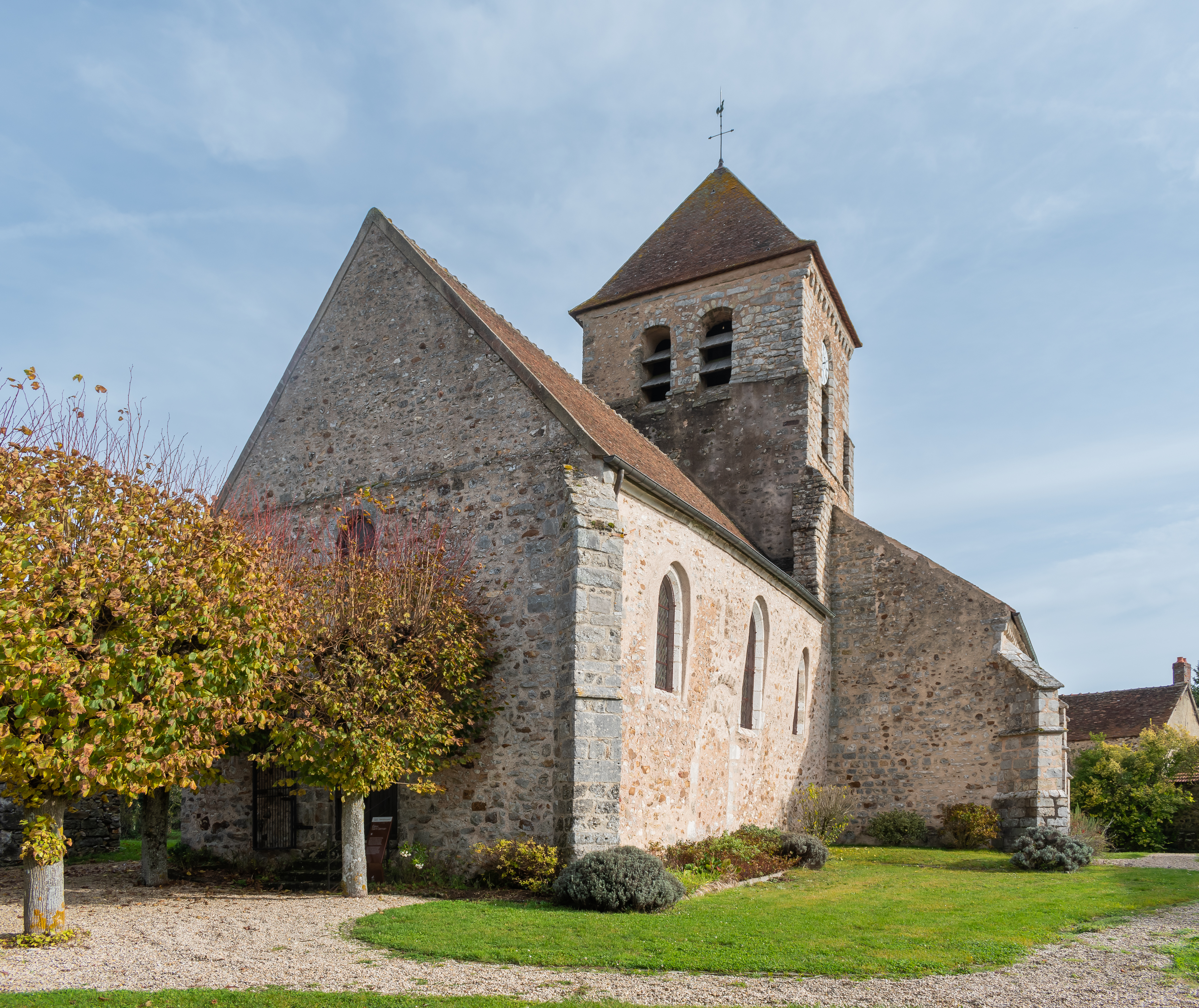
- The church in Montceaux-lès-Provins
- Location of Montceaux-lès-Provins
- Location within France Location within Île-de-France (region)
- Coordinates: 48°41′39″N 3°26′22″E
- Country: France
- Region: Île-de-France
- Department: Seine-et-Marne
- Arrondissement: Provins
- Canton: Provins
- Intercommunality: Provinois

Government
  - Mayor (2020–2026): Olivier Arthur
- Area^{1}: 15.35 km^{2} (5.93 sq mi)
- Highest elevation: 202 m (663 ft)
- Lowest elevation: 155 m (509 ft)
- Population (2023): 320
  - Density: 21/km^{2} (54/sq mi)
- Time zone: UTC+01:00 (CET)
  - Summer (DST): UTC+02:00 (CEST)
- INSEE/Postal code: 77301 /77151
- ^{1} French Land Register data, which excludes lakes, ponds, glaciers > 1 km^{2} (0.386 sq mi or 247 acres) and river estuaries.

Montceaux-lès-Provins (French pronunciation: [mɔ̃so lɛ pʁɔvɛ̃], literally Montceaux near Provins) is a commune in the Seine-et-Marne department in the Île-de-France region in north-central France.

== See also ==
- Communes of the Seine-et-Marne department
