= Léchelle, Seine-et-Marne =

Léchelle
- Commune
- Location of Léchelle
- Location within France Location within Île-de-France (region)
- Coordinates: 48°34′38″N 3°23′28″E
- Country: France
- Region: Île-de-France
- Department: Seine-et-Marne
- Arrondissement: Provins
- Canton: Provins
- Intercommunality: Provinois

Government
  - Mayor (2020–2026): Martine Legrand
- Area^{1}: 22.05 km^{2} (8.51 sq mi)
- Highest elevation: 172 m (564 ft)
- Lowest elevation: 97 m (318 ft)
- Population (2023): 572
  - Density: 25.9/km^{2} (67.2/sq mi)
- Time zone: UTC+01:00 (CET)
  - Summer (DST): UTC+02:00 (CEST)
- INSEE/Postal code: 77246 /77171
- ^{1} French Land Register data, which excludes lakes, ponds, glaciers > 1 km^{2} (0.386 sq mi or 247 acres) and river estuaries.

Léchelle (French pronunciation: [leʃɛl]) is a commune in the Seine-et-Marne department in the Île-de-France region in north-central France.

== Demographics ==
Inhabitants are called Léchellois.

== See also ==
- Communes of the Seine-et-Marne department
