= Chalautre-la-Grande =

- Commune
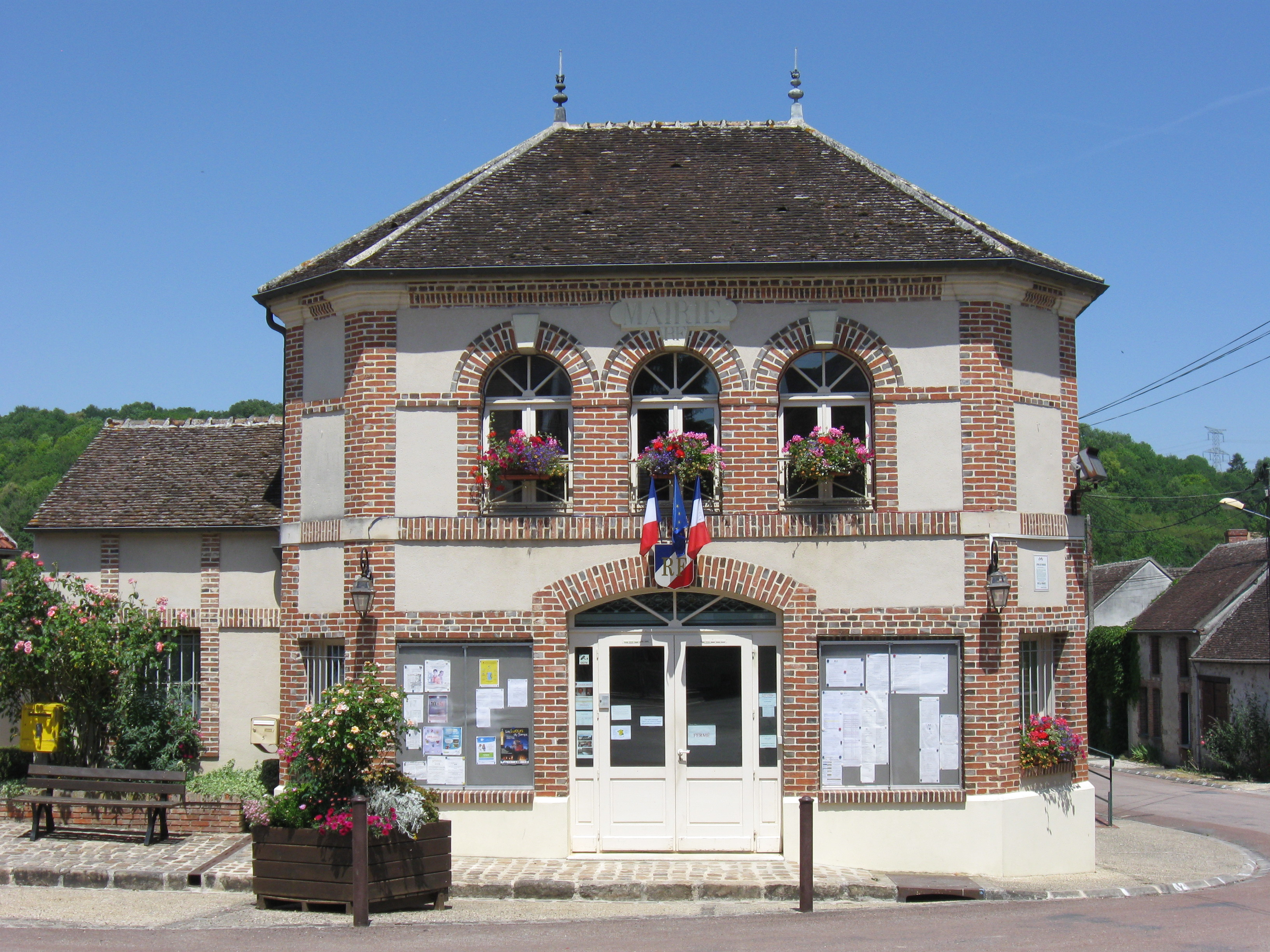
- The town hall in Chalautre-la-Grande
- Location of Chalautre-la-Grande
- Location within France Location within Île-de-France (region)
- Coordinates: 48°32′32″N 3°27′39″E
- Country: France
- Region: Île-de-France
- Department: Seine-et-Marne
- Arrondissement: Provins
- Canton: Provins
- Intercommunality: CC Provinois

Government
  - Mayor (2020–2026): Michèle Pannier
- Area^{1}: 18.33 km^{2} (7.08 sq mi)
- Highest elevation: 183 m (600 ft)
- Lowest elevation: 89 m (292 ft)
- Population (2023): 644
  - Density: 35.1/km^{2} (91.0/sq mi)
- Time zone: UTC+01:00 (CET)
  - Summer (DST): UTC+02:00 (CEST)
- INSEE/Postal code: 77072 /77171
- ^{1} French Land Register data, which excludes lakes, ponds, glaciers > 1 km^{2} (0.386 sq mi or 247 acres) and river estuaries.

Chalautre-la-Grande (French pronunciation: [ʃalotʁ la ɡʁɑ̃d]) is a commune in the Seine-et-Marne department in the Île-de-France region in north-central France.

== Demographics ==
The inhabitants are called Chalautriers.

== See also ==
- Communes of the Seine-et-Marne department
