= Communauté de communes du Canton de Bray-sur-Seine =

Coordinates: 48.4148°N 3.2386°E

Canton de Bray-sur-Seine
- Former communauté de communes
- Interactive map of Canton de Bray-sur-Seine
- Country: France
- Region: Île-de-France
- Department: Seine-et-Marne
- No. of communes: {{{nbcomm}}}
- Established: October 1973
- Disbanded: 2014
- Area: 243 km^{2} (94 sq mi)
- Population (1999): 12,774
  - Density: 52.6/km^{2} (136/sq mi)

The Communauté de communes du Canton de Bray-sur-Seine (after 2006: Communauté de communes de la Bassée) is a former federation of municipalities (communauté de communes) in the Seine-et-Marne département and in the Île-de-France région of France. It was created in October 1973. It was merged into the new Communauté de communes de la Bassée - Montois in January 2014.

== Composition ==
The Communauté de communes comprised the following communes:

- Baby
- Balloy
- Bazoches-lès-Bray
- Bray-sur-Seine
- Chalmaison
- Everly
- Fontaine-Fourches
- Gouaix
- Gravon
- Grisy-sur-Seine
- Hermé
- Jaulnes
- Montigny-le-Guesdier
- Mousseaux-lès-Bray
- Mouy-sur-Seine
- Noyen-sur-Seine
- Les Ormes-sur-Voulzie
- Passy-sur-Seine
- Saint-Sauveur-lès-Bray
- La Tombe
- Villenauxe-la-Petite
- Villiers-sur-Seine
- Villuis

== See also ==
- Communes of the Seine-et-Marne department
