= Canton of Bray-sur-Seine =

Coordinates: 48°25′40″N 3°16′05″E

Bray-sur-Seine
- Former canton
- Interactive map of Bray-sur-Seine
- Country: France
- Region: Île-de-France
- Department: Seine-et-Marne
- No. of communes: {{{nbcomm}}}
- Disbanded: 2015
- Area: 240.76 km^{2} (92.96 sq mi)
- Population (2012): 12,547
  - Density: 52.114/km^{2} (134.97/sq mi)

The canton of Bray-sur-Seine is a French former administrative division, located in the arrondissement of Provins, in the Seine-et-Marne département (Île-de-France région). It was disbanded following the French canton reorganisation which came into effect in March 2015. It consisted of 23 communes, which joined the canton of Provins in 2015.

== Demographics ==
Historical population
Year	Pop.	±%
1999	11,532	—
2006	11,779	+2.1%
2012	12,547	+6.5%

== Composition ==
The canton of Bray-sur-Seine was composed of 23 communes:

- Baby
- Balloy
- Bazoches-lès-Bray
- Bray-sur-Seine
- Chalmaison
- Everly
- Fontaine-Fourches
- Gouaix
- Gravon
- Grisy-sur-Seine
- Hermé
- Jaulnes
- Montigny-le-Guesdier
- Mousseaux-lès-Bray
- Mouy-sur-Seine
- Noyen-sur-Seine
- Les Ormes-sur-Voulzie
- Passy-sur-Seine
- Saint-Sauveur-lès-Bray
- La Tombe
- Villenauxe-la-Petite
- Villiers-sur-Seine
- Villuis

== See also ==
- Cantons of the Seine-et-Marne department
- Communes of the Seine-et-Marne department
