= Sylvestre Gallot =

French mathematician (born 1948)

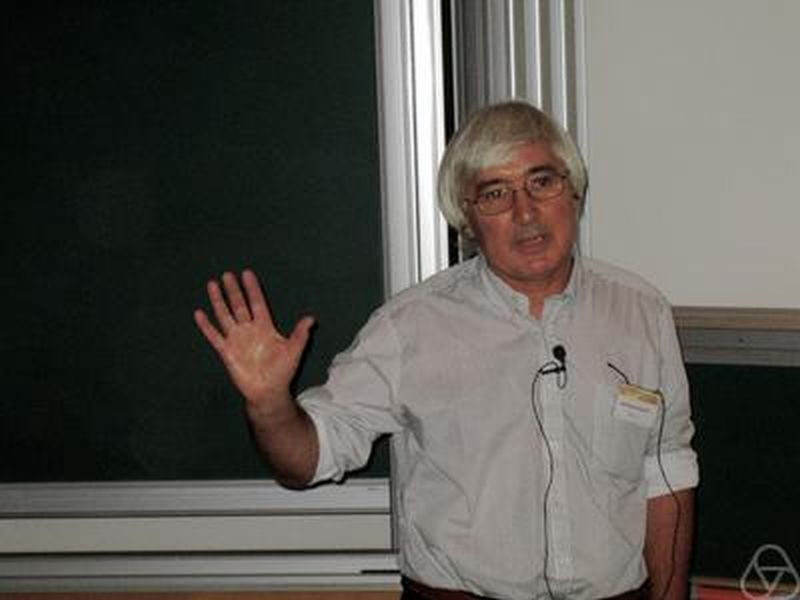
- Born: Sylvestre F. L. Gallot; January 29, 1948 (age 78); Bazoches-lès-Bray, France
- Education: Paris Diderot University
- Known for: Isoperimetric inequalities in Riemannian geometry, minimal entropy rigidity
- Scientific career
- Fields: Mathematics (differential geometry)
- Institutions: University of Savoy; École Normale Supérieure de Lyon; Université Grenoble Alpes
- Doctoral advisor: Marcel Berger

Sylvestre F. L. Gallot (born January 29, 1948, in Bazoches-lès-Bray) is a French mathematician, specializing in differential geometry. He is an emeritus professor at the Institut Fourier of the Université Grenoble Alpes, in the Geometry and Topology section.

== Education and career ==
Sylvestre Gallot received his doctorate from Paris Diderot University (Paris 7) with thesis under the direction of Marcel Berger. Gallot worked during the early 1980s at the University of Savoie, then at the École Normale Supérieure de Lyon and the University of Grenoble (Institut Fourier).

His research deals with isoperimetric inequalities in Riemann geometry, rigidity issues, and the Laplace operator spectrum on Riemannian manifolds. With Gérard Besson and Pierre Bérard, he discovered, in 1985, a form of isoperimetric inequality in Riemannian manifolds with a lower bound involving the diameter and Ricci curvature. In 1995, he discovered with Gérard Besson and Gilles Courtois, a Chebyshev inequality for the minimal entropy of locally symmetrical spaces of negative curvature; the inequality gives a new and simpler proof of the Mostow rigidity theorem. The result of Besson, Courtois, and Gallo is called minimal entropy rigidity.

In 1998 he was an invited speaker with talk Curvature decreasing maps are volume decreasing at the International Congress of Mathematicians in Berlin.

== Selected publications ==
- with Dominique Hulin, Jacques Lafontaine Riemannian Geometry, Universitext, Springer Verlag, 3rd edition 2004
- with Daniel Meyer Opérateur de courbure et laplacien des formes différentielles d´une variété riemannienne, J. Math. Pures Appliqués, 54, 1975, 259–284
- Inégalités isopérimétriques, courbure de Ricci et invariants géométriques, 1,2, C. R. Acad. Sci., 296, 1983, 333–336, 365–368
- Inégalités isopérimétriques et analytiques sur les variétés riemanniennes, Astérisque 163/164, 1988, 33–91
- with Pierre Bérard, Gérard Besson Sur une inégalité isopérimétrique qui généralise celle de Paul Lévy-Gromov, Inventiones Mathematicae, vol. 80, 1985, pp. 295–308 doi:10.1007/BF01388608
- with G. Besson, P. Bérard Embedding Riemannian manifolds by their heat kernel, Geometric Functional Analysis (GAFA), 4, 1994, pp. 373–398 doi:10.1007/BF01896401
- with G. Besson, G. Courtois Volume et entropie minimale des espaces localement symétriques, Inventiones Mathematicae, 103, 1991, pp. 417–445 doi:10.1007/BF01239520
- with G. Besson, G. Courtois: Les variétés hyperboliques sont des minima locaux de l’entropie topologique, Inventiones Mathematicae 177, 1994, pp. 403–445 doi:10.1007/BF01232251
- with G. Besson G. Courtois: Volume et entropie minimales des variétés localement symétriques, GAFA 5, 1995, pp. 731–799
- with G. Besson, G. Courtois: Minimal entropy and Mostow’s rigidity theorems, Ergodic Theory and Dynamical Systems, 16, 1996, pp. 623–649
- Volumes, courbure de Ricci et convergence des variétés, d'après Tobias Colding et Cheeger-Colding, Séminaire Bourbaki 835, 1997/98
