= Hulin (disambiguation) =

Hulin is a county-level city in Jixi prefecture, Heilongjiang province, People's Republic of China.

Hulin may also refer to:

- Hulín, town in Zlín Region, Czech Republic
- Dominique Hulin (born 1959), French mathematician
- Michel Hulin (born 1936), French philosopher
- Pierre-Augustin Hulin (1758–1841), French general under Napoleon Bonaparte
- Suicide of Rodney Hulin in prison in Texas in 1996
- Hulin Rocks, or the Maidens, County Antrim, Northern Ireland

== See also ==
- Hullin
