= Communauté de communes de la Bassée - Montois =

Federation of municipalities in France

Bassée - Montois
- Communauté de communes
- Interactive map of Bassée - Montois
- Coordinates: 48°29′N 03°08′E
- Country: France
- Region: Île-de-France
- Department: Seine-et-Marne
- No. of communes: {{{nbcomm}}}
- Established: 2014
- Area: 421.8 km^{2} (162.9 sq mi)
- Population (2019): 23,230
  - Density: 55.07/km^{2} (142.6/sq mi)

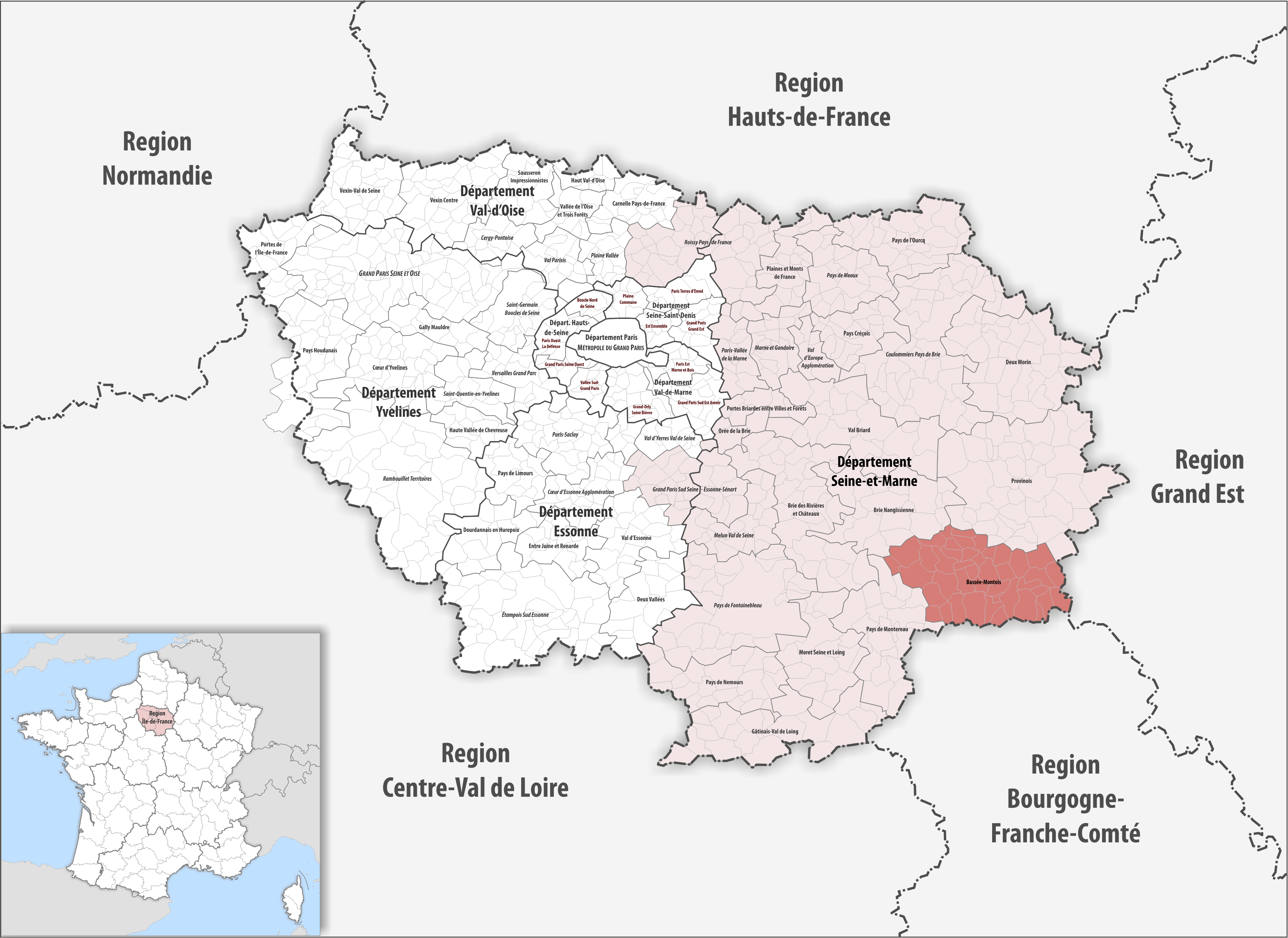
The age of the Bassée-Montois local authorities

The Communauté de communes de la Bassée - Montois is a communauté de communes in the Seine-et-Marne département and in the Île-de-France région of France. It was formed on 1 January 2014 by the merger of the former Communauté de communes de la Bassée and the Communauté de communes du Montois. Its seat is in Donnemarie-Dontilly. Its area is 421.8 km^{2}, and its population was 23,230 in 2019.

== Composition ==
The communauté de communes consists of the following 42 communes:

1. Baby
2. Balloy
3. Bazoches-lès-Bray
4. Bray-sur-Seine
5. Cessoy-en-Montois
6. Chalmaison
7. Châtenay-sur-Seine
8. Coutençon
9. Donnemarie-Dontilly
10. Égligny
11. Everly
12. Fontaine-Fourches
13. Gouaix
14. Gravon
15. Grisy-sur-Seine
16. Gurcy-le-Châtel
17. Hermé
18. Jaulnes
19. Jutigny
20. Lizines
21. Luisetaines
22. Meigneux
23. Mons-en-Montois
24. Montigny-le-Guesdier
25. Montigny-Lencoup
26. Mousseaux-lès-Bray
27. Mouy-sur-Seine
28. Noyen-sur-Seine
29. Les Ormes-sur-Voulzie
30. Paroy
31. Passy-sur-Seine
32. Saint-Sauveur-lès-Bray
33. Savins
34. Sigy
35. Sognolles-en-Montois
36. Thénisy
37. La Tombe
38. Villenauxe-la-Petite
39. Villeneuve-les-Bordes
40. Villiers-sur-Seine
41. Villuis
42. Vimpelles
