= Donnemarie-Dontilly =

- Commune
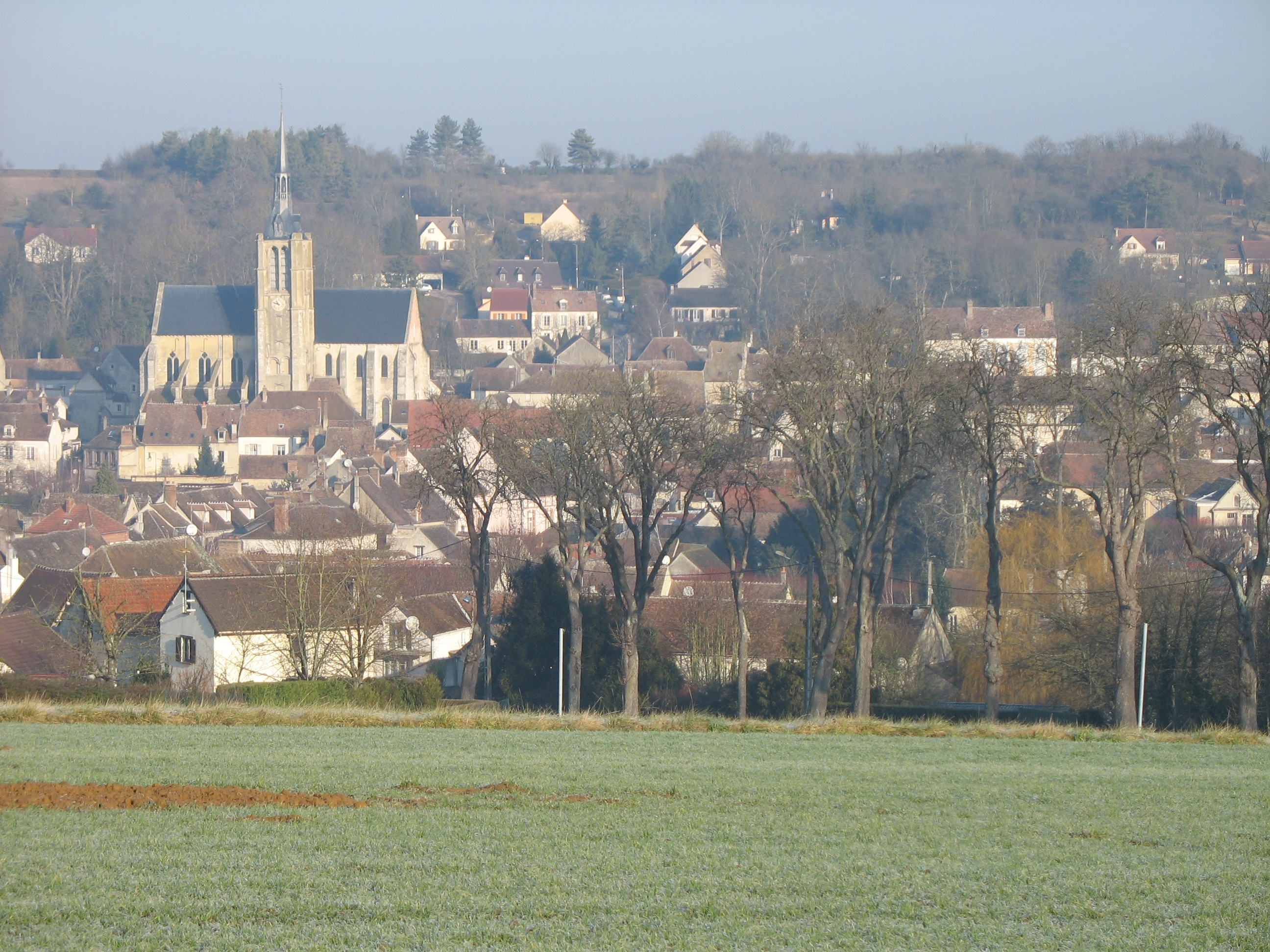
- Donnemarie-Dontilly

- Coat of arms
- Location of Donnemarie-Dontilly
- Location within France Location within Île-de-France (region)
- Coordinates: 48°28′33″N 3°07′38″E
- Country: France
- Region: Île-de-France
- Department: Seine-et-Marne
- Arrondissement: Provins
- Canton: Provins
- Intercommunality: CC Bassée - Montois

Government
  - Mayor (2020–2026): Sandrine Sosinski
- Area^{1}: 12.07 km^{2} (4.66 sq mi)
- Highest elevation: 139 m (456 ft)
- Lowest elevation: 68 m (223 ft)
- Population (2023): 2,706
  - Density: 224.2/km^{2} (580.7/sq mi)
- Time zone: UTC+01:00 (CET)
  - Summer (DST): UTC+02:00 (CEST)
- INSEE/Postal code: 77159 /77520
- ^{1} French Land Register data, which excludes lakes, ponds, glaciers > 1 km^{2} (0.386 sq mi or 247 acres) and river estuaries.

Donnemarie-Dontilly (French pronunciation: [dɔnmaʁi dɔ̃tiji]) is a commune in the Seine-et-Marne department in the Île-de-France region in north-central France.

== Population ==
Historical population
Year	Pop.	±% p.a.
1968	1,668	—
1975	1,809	+1.17%
1982	1,845	+0.28%
1990	2,295	+2.77%
1999	2,628	+1.52%
2007	2,760	+0.61%
2012	2,876	+0.83%
2017	2,832	−0.31%
2023	2,706	−0.76%
Source: INSEE

Inhabitants of Donnemarie-Dontilly are called Donnemaritains in French.

== See also ==
- Communes of the Seine-et-Marne department
