= Saint-Sauveur-lès-Bray =

- Commune
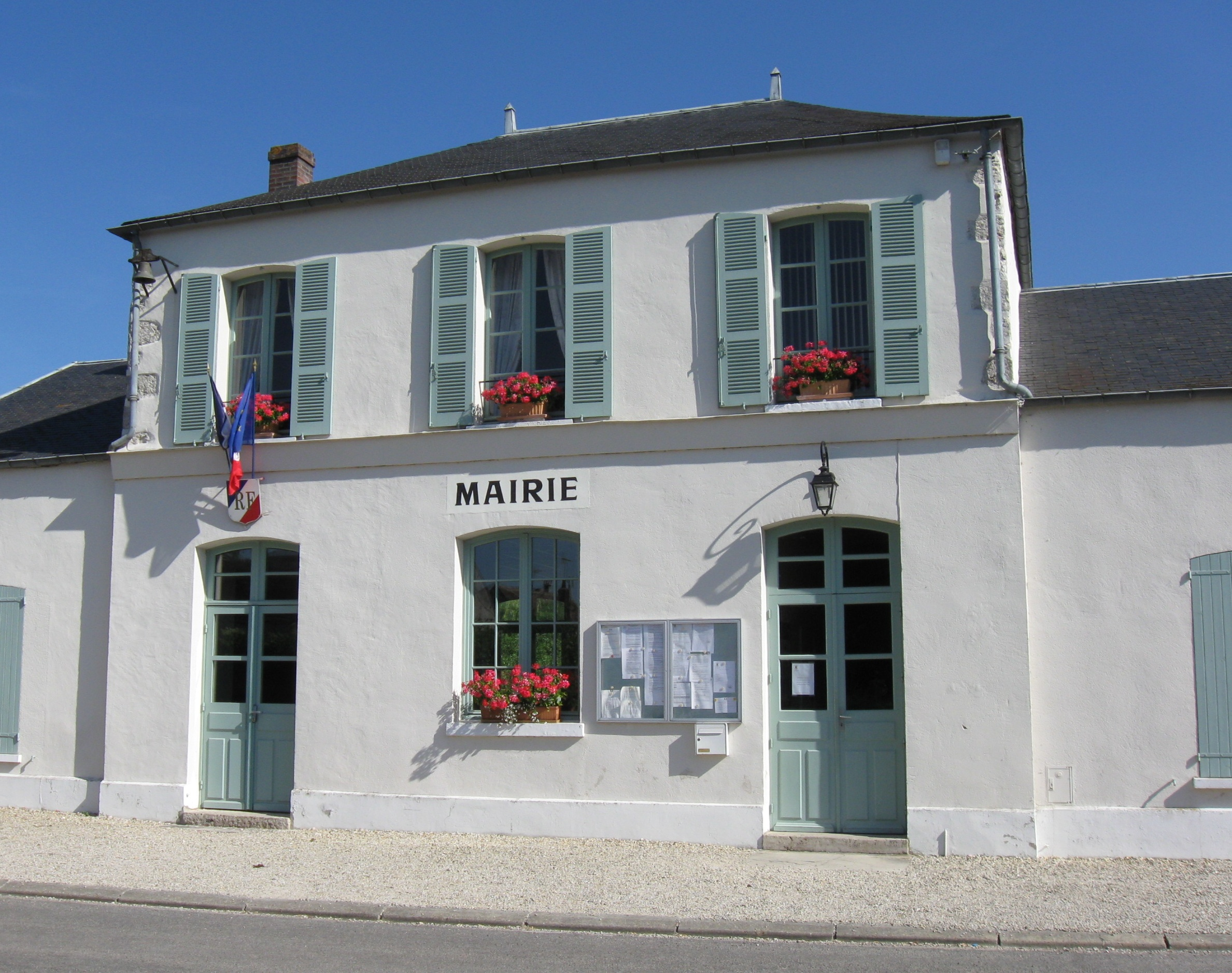
- The town hall in Saint-Sauveur-lès-Bray
- Location of Saint-Sauveur-lès-Bray
- Location within France Location within Île-de-France (region)
- Coordinates: 48°26′16″N 3°12′32″E
- Country: France
- Region: Île-de-France
- Department: Seine-et-Marne
- Arrondissement: Provins
- Canton: Provins
- Intercommunality: CC Bassée - Montois

Government
  - Mayor (2020–2026): Gerard Jambut
- Area^{1}: 6.52 km^{2} (2.52 sq mi)
- Highest elevation: 58 m (190 ft)
- Lowest elevation: 50 m (160 ft)
- Population (2023): 350
  - Density: 54/km^{2} (140/sq mi)
- Time zone: UTC+01:00 (CET)
  - Summer (DST): UTC+02:00 (CEST)
- INSEE/Postal code: 77434 /77480
- ^{1} French Land Register data, which excludes lakes, ponds, glaciers > 1 km^{2} (0.386 sq mi or 247 acres) and river estuaries.

Saint-Sauveur-lès-Bray (French pronunciation: [sɛ̃ sovœʁ lɛ bʁɛ], literally Saint-Sauveur near Bray) is a commune in the Seine-et-Marne department in the Île-de-France region in north-central France.

== Demographics ==
Inhabitants of Saint-Sauveur-lès-Bray are called Saint-Salvatoriens.

== See also ==
- Communes of the Seine-et-Marne department
