= Dominique Hulin =

French mathematician (born 1959)

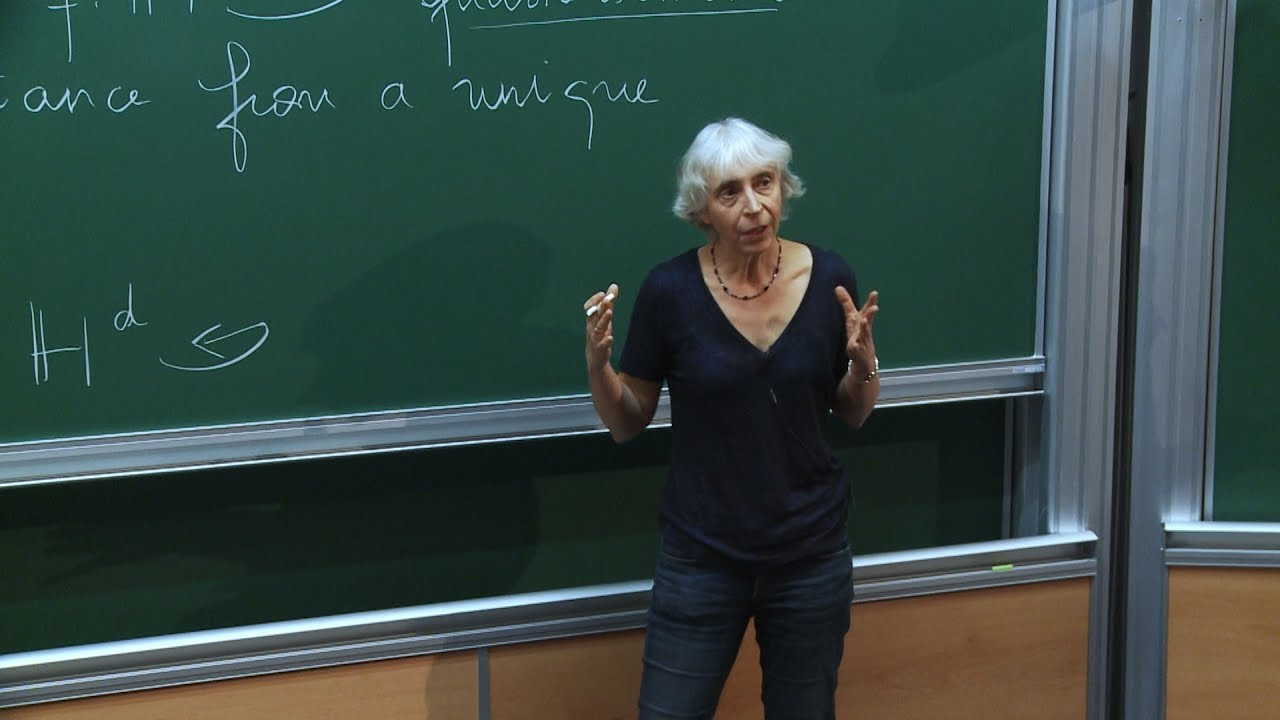

Academic background
- Education: Ecole Normale Supérieure
- Thesis: Pinching and Betti numbers (1983)
- Doctoral advisor: Marcel Berger

Academic work
- Discipline: Mathematics
- Sub-discipline: Differential geometry, Riemannian geometry
- Institutions: Paris-Saclay University
- Website: Home page

Dominique Hulin (born 1959) is a French mathematician specializing in differential geometry and known for her textbook on Riemannian geometry.

Hulin studied mathematics at the Ecole Normale Supérieure in Paris from 1978 to 1983, working there with Marcel Berger and completing her doctorate in 1983 with the dissertation Pinching and Betti numbers. She was an assistant professor at Paris Diderot University from 1983 to 1985, when she became maître de conferences at Paris-Sud University, which later became Paris-Saclay University. In 2019 she was advanced to the exceptional class of maîtres de conferences.

She is the coauthor, with Sylvestre Gallot and Jacques Lafontaine, of the textbook Riemannian Geometry (Universitext, Springer, 1987; 3rd ed., 2004).
