= Mousseaux-lès-Bray =

- Commune
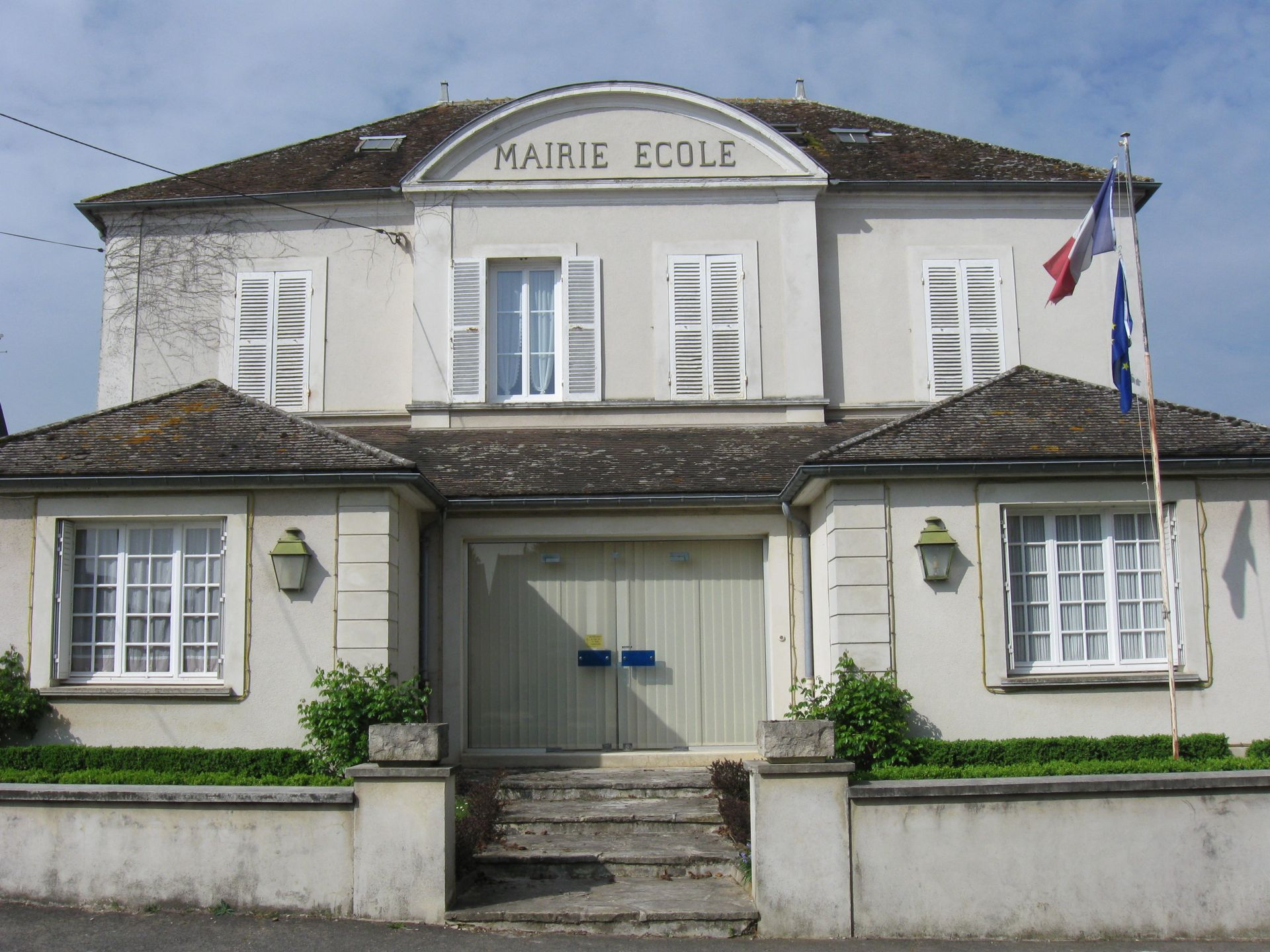
- The town hall in Mousseaux-lès-Bray
- Location of Mousseaux-lès-Bray
- Location within France Location within Île-de-France (region)
- Coordinates: 48°24′39″N 3°13′45″E
- Country: France
- Region: Île-de-France
- Department: Seine-et-Marne
- Arrondissement: Provins
- Canton: Provins
- Intercommunality: CC Bassée - Montois

Government
  - Mayor (2020–2026): Francis Flamey
- Area^{1}: 8.33 km^{2} (3.22 sq mi)
- Highest elevation: 132 m (433 ft)
- Lowest elevation: 54 m (177 ft)
- Population (2023): 682
  - Density: 81.9/km^{2} (212/sq mi)
- Time zone: UTC+01:00 (CET)
  - Summer (DST): UTC+02:00 (CEST)
- INSEE/Postal code: 77321 /77480
- ^{1} French Land Register data, which excludes lakes, ponds, glaciers > 1 km^{2} (0.386 sq mi or 247 acres) and river estuaries.

Mousseaux-lès-Bray (French pronunciation: [muso lɛ bʁɛ], literally Mousseaux near Bray) is a commune in the Seine-et-Marne department in the Île-de-France region in north-central France.

== Demographics ==
Inhabitants are called Mousseautois.

== See also ==
- Communes of the Seine-et-Marne department
