= Baby, Seine-et-Marne =

Baby
- Commune
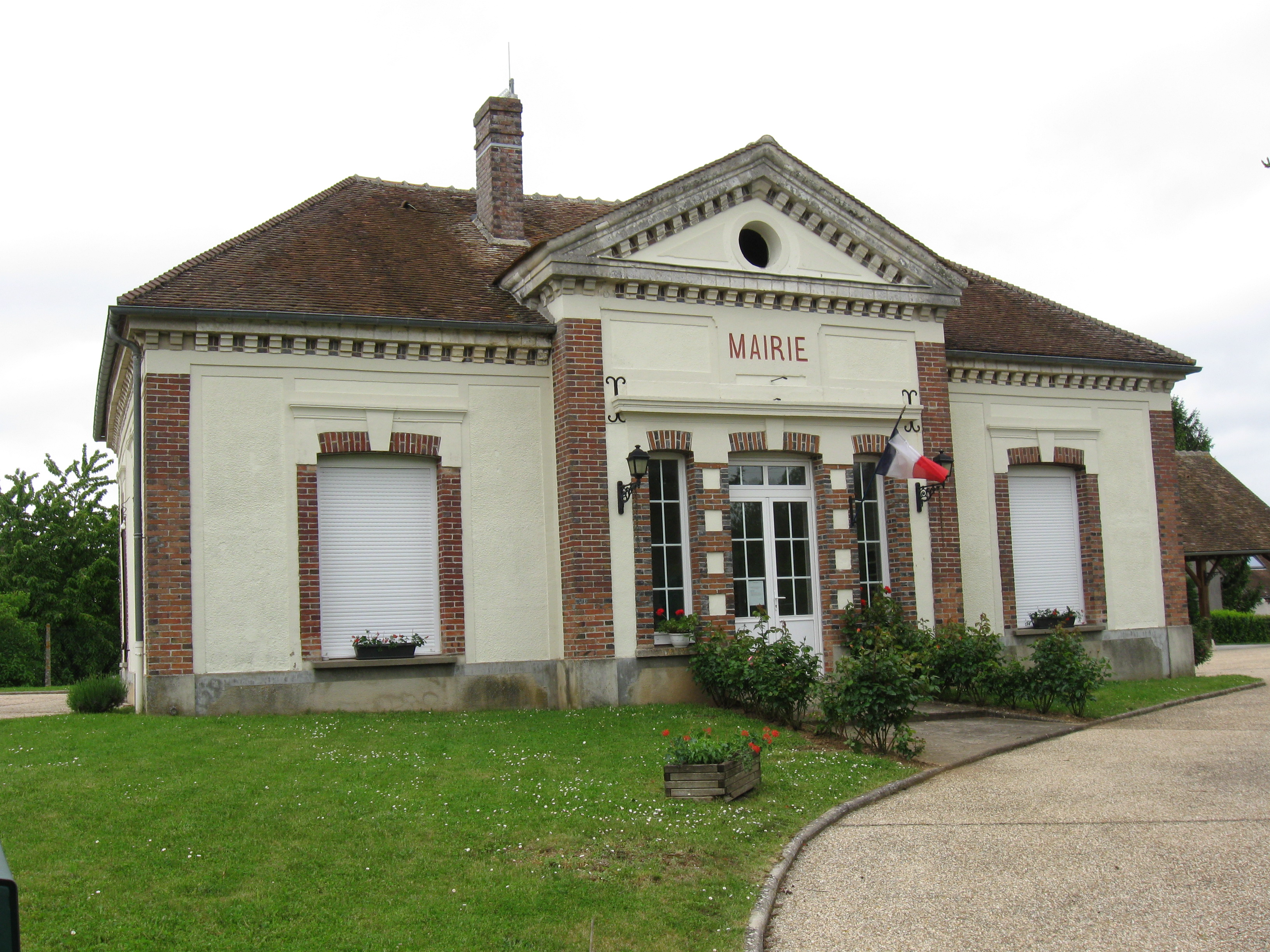
- The town hall in Baby
- Location of Baby
- Location within France Location within Île-de-France (region)
- Coordinates: 48°23′50″N 3°20′31″E
- Country: France
- Region: Île-de-France
- Department: Seine-et-Marne
- Arrondissement: Provins
- Canton: Provins
- Intercommunality: Bassée-Montois

Government
  - Mayor (2020–2026): Dominique Mirvault
- Area^{1}: 4.12 km^{2} (1.59 sq mi)
- Highest elevation: 143 m (469 ft)
- Lowest elevation: 71 m (233 ft)
- Population (2023): 113
  - Density: 27.4/km^{2} (71.0/sq mi)
- Time zone: UTC+01:00 (CET)
  - Summer (DST): UTC+02:00 (CEST)
- INSEE/Postal code: 77015 /77480
- ^{1} French Land Register data, which excludes lakes, ponds, glaciers > 1 km^{2} (0.386 sq mi or 247 acres) and river estuaries.

Baby (French pronunciation: [babi]) is a commune in the Seine-et-Marne department in the Île-de-France region in north-central France.

== Population ==
The inhabitants are called Bédoins in French.

Historical population
Year	Pop.	±% p.a.
1968	80	—
1975	69	−2.09%
1982	59	−2.21%
1990	80	+3.88%
1999	66	−2.11%
2007	69	+0.56%
2012	97	+7.05%
2017	95	−0.42%
2023	113	+2.93%
Source: INSEE

== See also ==
- Communes of the Seine-et-Marne department
