= Jaulnes =

- Commune
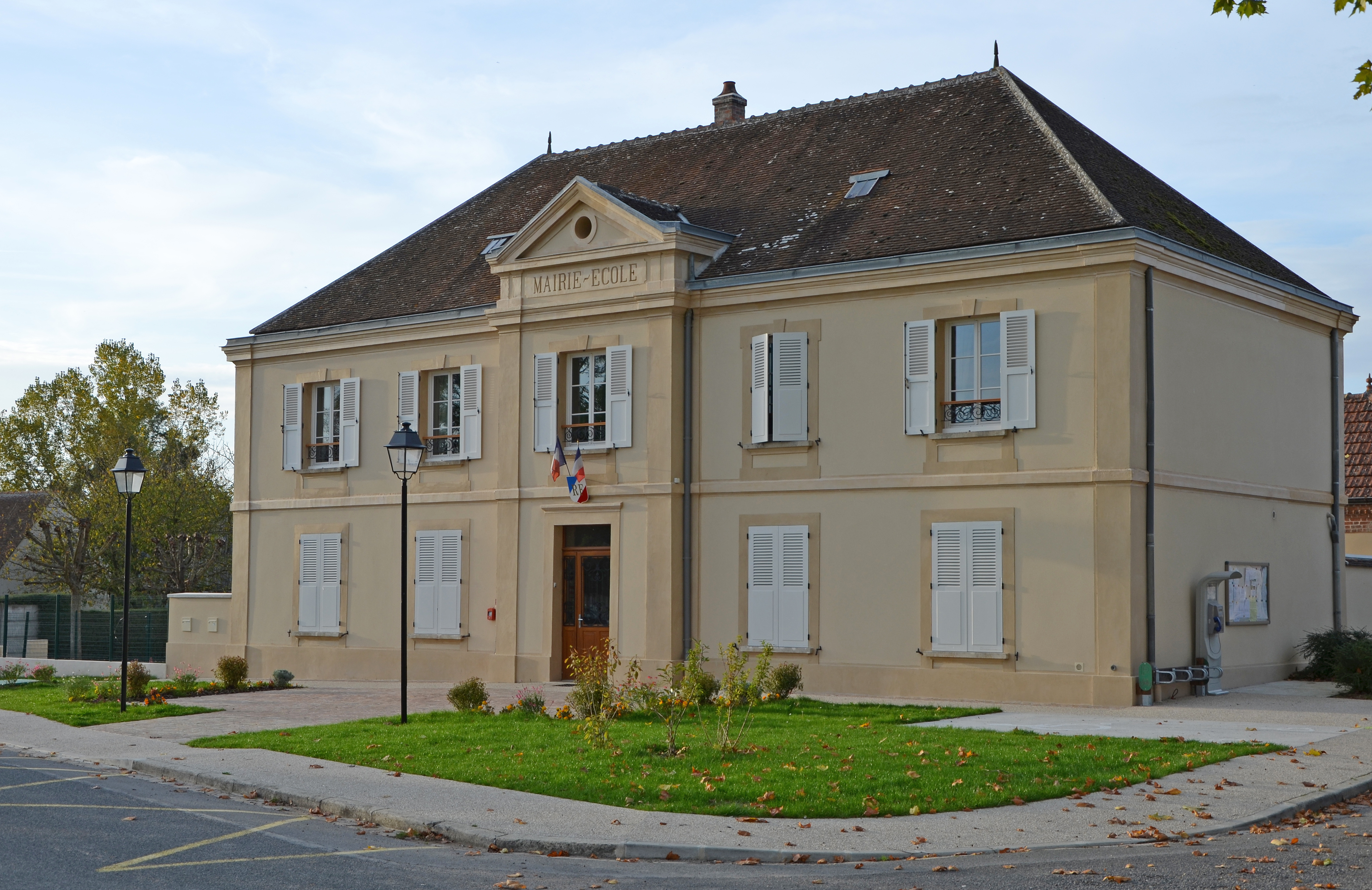
- The town hall in Jaulnes
- Location of Jaulnes
- Location within France Location within Île-de-France (region)
- Coordinates: 48°25′04″N 3°16′23″E
- Country: France
- Region: Île-de-France
- Department: Seine-et-Marne
- Arrondissement: Provins
- Canton: Provins
- Intercommunality: CC Bassée - Montois

Government
  - Mayor (2020–2026): Stéphane Gyarmathy
- Area^{1}: 15.84 km^{2} (6.12 sq mi)
- Highest elevation: 122 m (400 ft)
- Lowest elevation: 54 m (177 ft)
- Population (2023): 344
  - Density: 21.7/km^{2} (56.2/sq mi)
- Time zone: UTC+01:00 (CET)
  - Summer (DST): UTC+02:00 (CEST)
- INSEE/Postal code: 77236 /77480
- ^{1} French Land Register data, which excludes lakes, ponds, glaciers > 1 km^{2} (0.386 sq mi or 247 acres) and river estuaries.

Jaulnes is a commune in the Seine-et-Marne department in the Île-de-France region in north-central France.

== Demographics ==
Inhabitants are called Jaulnois.

== See also ==
- Communes of the Seine-et-Marne department
