= Hermé =

- Commune
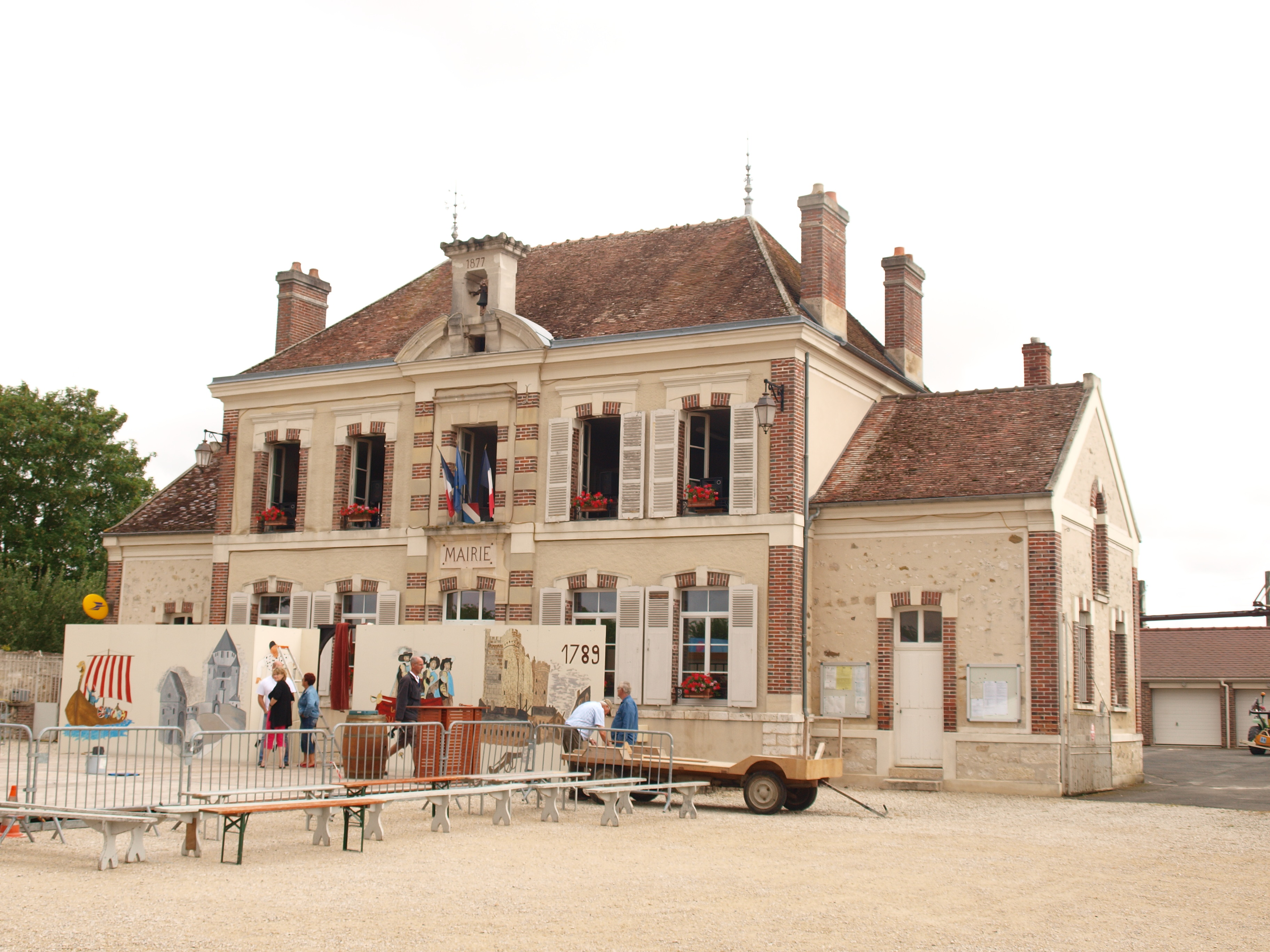
- The town hall in Hermé

- Coat of arms
- Location of Hermé
- Location within France Location within Île-de-France (region)
- Coordinates: 48°28′58″N 3°20′48″E
- Country: France
- Region: Île-de-France
- Department: Seine-et-Marne
- Arrondissement: Provins
- Canton: Provins
- Intercommunality: CC Bassée - Montois

Government
  - Mayor (2020–2026): Jean-Pierre Bourlet
- Area^{1}: 15.9 km^{2} (6.1 sq mi)
- Highest elevation: 160 m (520 ft)
- Lowest elevation: 56 m (184 ft)
- Population (2023): 647
  - Density: 40.7/km^{2} (105/sq mi)
- Time zone: UTC+01:00 (CET)
  - Summer (DST): UTC+02:00 (CEST)
- INSEE/Postal code: 77227 /77114
- ^{1} French Land Register data, which excludes lakes, ponds, glaciers > 1 km^{2} (0.386 sq mi or 247 acres) and river estuaries.

Hermé (French pronunciation: [ɛʁme]) is a commune in the Seine-et-Marne department in the Île-de-France region in north-central France.

== Demographics ==
Inhabitants are called Hermillons.

== See also ==
- Communes of the Seine-et-Marne department
