= Gravon =

- Commune
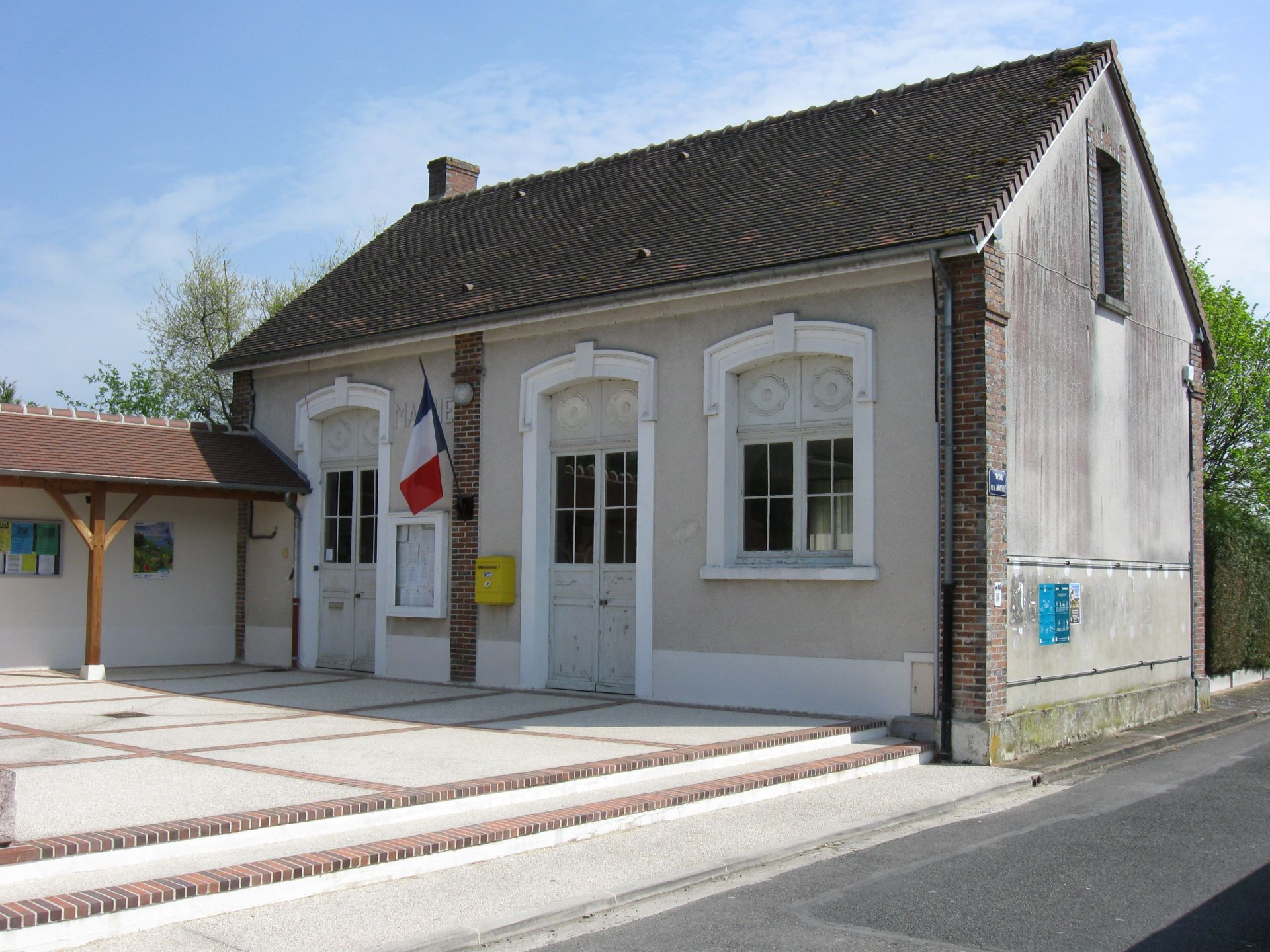
- The town hall in Gravon
- Location of Gravon
- Location within France Location within Île-de-France (region)
- Coordinates: 48°24′N 3°07′E
- Country: France
- Region: Île-de-France
- Department: Seine-et-Marne
- Arrondissement: Provins
- Canton: Provins
- Intercommunality: CC Bassée - Montois

Government
  - Mayor (2020–2026): Brice Chantre
- Area^{1}: 7.55 km^{2} (2.92 sq mi)
- Highest elevation: 121 m (397 ft)
- Lowest elevation: 51 m (167 ft)
- Population (2023): 156
  - Density: 20.7/km^{2} (53.5/sq mi)
- Time zone: UTC+01:00 (CET)
  - Summer (DST): UTC+02:00 (CEST)
- INSEE/Postal code: 77212 /77118
- ^{1} French Land Register data, which excludes lakes, ponds, glaciers > 1 km^{2} (0.386 sq mi or 247 acres) and river estuaries.

Gravon (French pronunciation: [ɡʁavɔ̃]) is a commune in the Seine-et-Marne département in the Île-de-France region in north-central France.

== Demographics ==
The inhabitants are called the Gravonais.

== See also ==
- Communes of the Seine-et-Marne department
