= Chalmaison =

- Commune
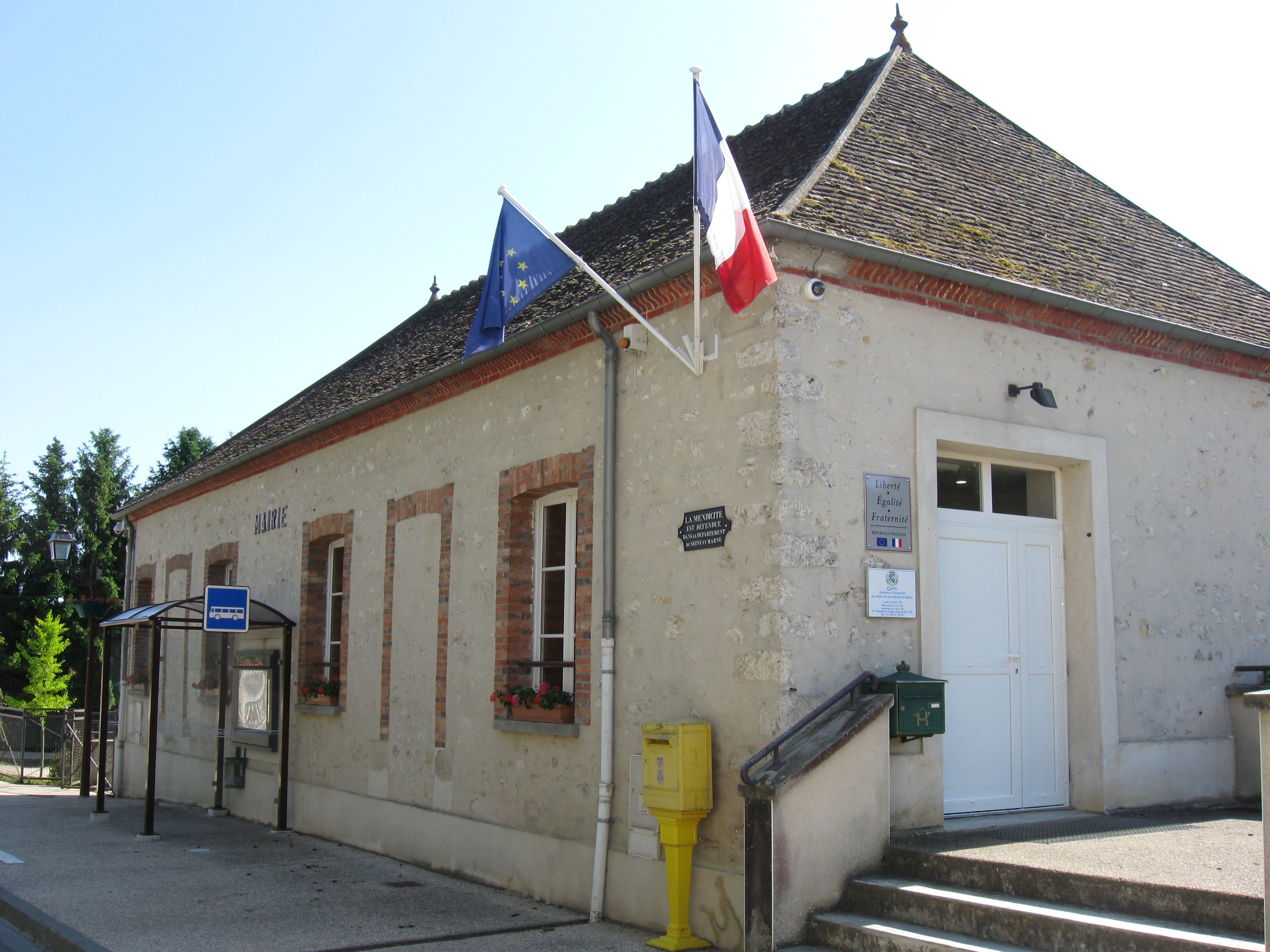
- The town hall in Chalmaison

- Coat of arms
- Location of Chalmaison
- Location within France Location within Île-de-France (region)
- Coordinates: 48°28′58″N 3°15′06″E
- Country: France
- Region: Île-de-France
- Department: Seine-et-Marne
- Arrondissement: Provins
- Canton: Provins
- Intercommunality: CC Bassée - Montois

Government
  - Mayor (2020–2026): Jean-Pierre Delannoy
- Area^{1}: 10.04 km^{2} (3.88 sq mi)
- Highest elevation: 154 m (505 ft)
- Lowest elevation: 59 m (194 ft)
- Population (2023): 749
  - Density: 74.6/km^{2} (193/sq mi)
- Time zone: UTC+01:00 (CET)
  - Summer (DST): UTC+02:00 (CEST)
- INSEE/Postal code: 77076 /77650
- ^{1} French Land Register data, which excludes lakes, ponds, glaciers > 1 km^{2} (0.386 sq mi or 247 acres) and river estuaries.

Chalmaison (French pronunciation: [ʃalmɛzɔ̃]) is a commune in the Seine-et-Marne department in the Île-de-France region of north-central France.

== Demographics ==
The inhabitants are called Chalmasonais.

== See also ==
- Communes of the Seine-et-Marne department
