= Villiers-sur-Seine =

- Commune
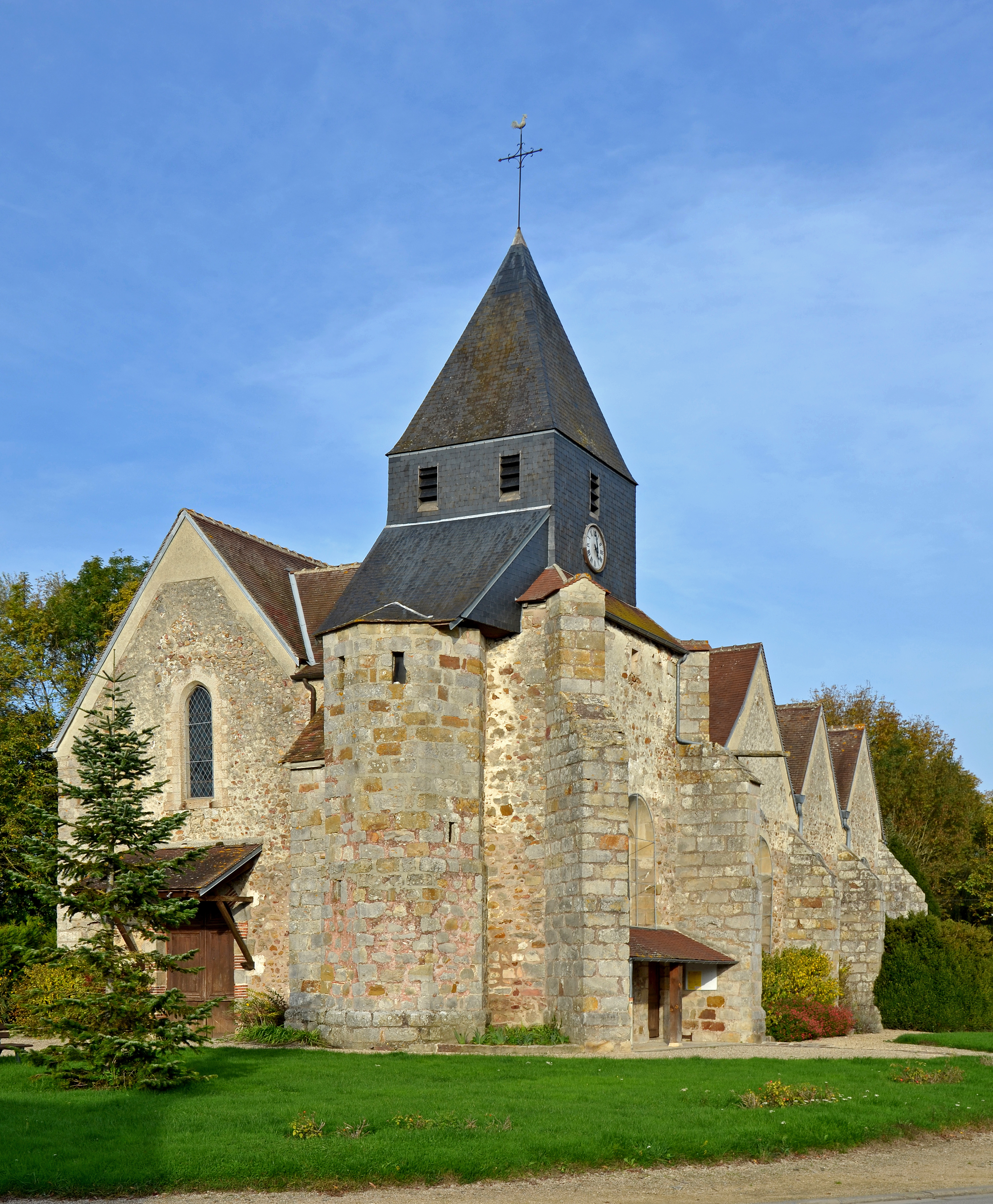
- The church in Villiers-sur-Seine
- Location of Villiers-sur-Seine
- Location within France Location within Île-de-France (region)
- Coordinates: 48°27′18″N 3°22′34″E
- Country: France
- Region: Île-de-France
- Department: Seine-et-Marne
- Arrondissement: Provins
- Canton: Provins
- Intercommunality: CC Bassée - Montois

Government
  - Mayor (2020–2026): Agnes Granero
- Area^{1}: 11.36 km^{2} (4.39 sq mi)
- Highest elevation: 66 m (217 ft)
- Lowest elevation: 56 m (184 ft)
- Population (2023): 278
  - Density: 24.5/km^{2} (63.4/sq mi)
- Time zone: UTC+01:00 (CET)
  - Summer (DST): UTC+02:00 (CEST)
- INSEE/Postal code: 77522 /77114
- ^{1} French Land Register data, which excludes lakes, ponds, glaciers > 1 km^{2} (0.386 sq mi or 247 acres) and river estuaries.

Villiers-sur-Seine (French pronunciation: [vilje syʁ sɛn]; lit. 'Villiers-on-Seine') is a commune in the Seine-et-Marne department in the Île-de-France region in north-central France.

== Demographics ==
Inhabitants of Villiers-sur-Seine are called Villierots.

== See also ==
- Communes of the Seine-et-Marne department
