= Villenauxe-la-Petite =

- Commune
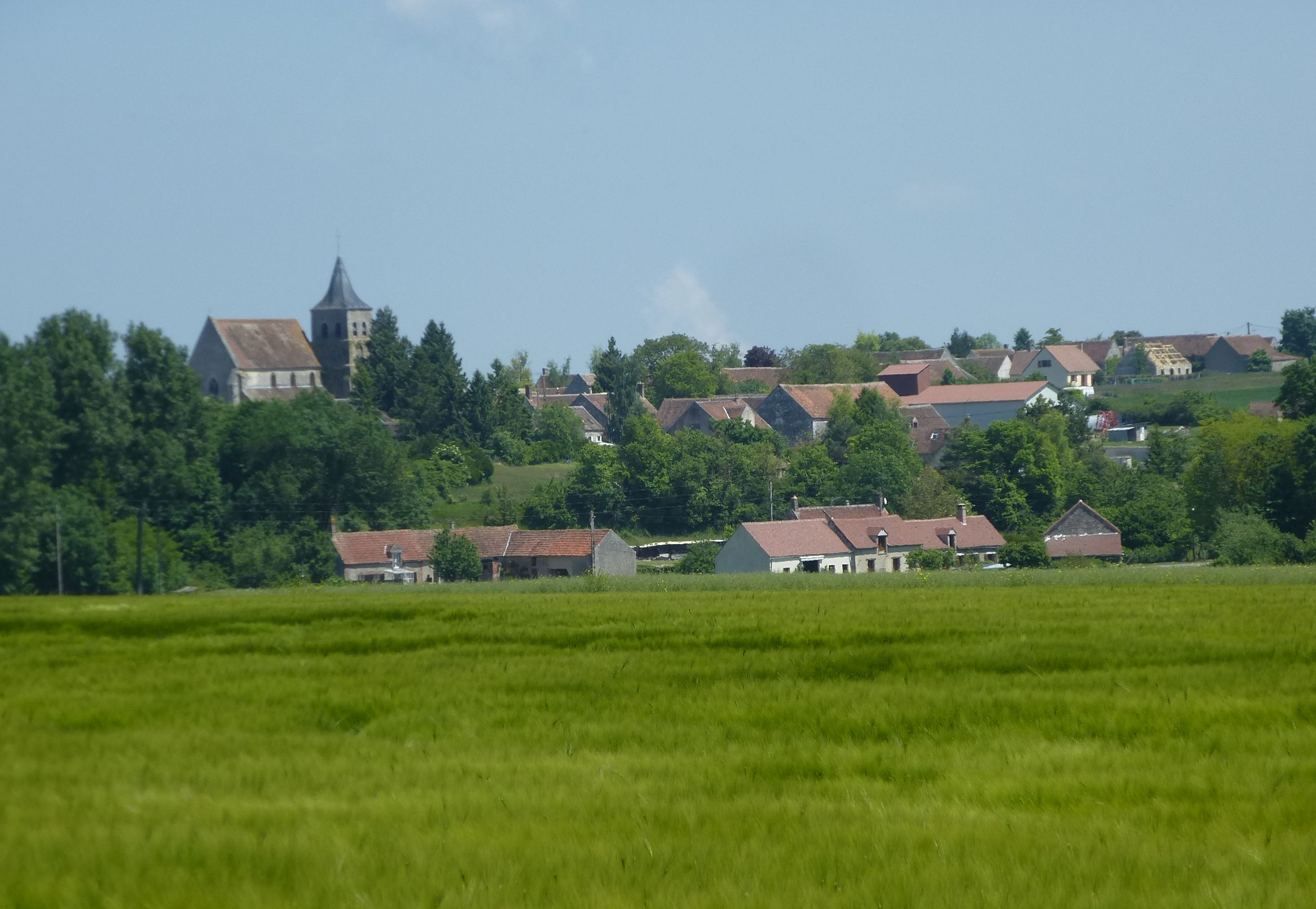
- A general view of Villenauxe-la-Petite
- Location of Villenauxe-la-Petite
- Location within France Location within Île-de-France (region)
- Coordinates: 48°24′23″N 3°18′41″E
- Country: France
- Region: Île-de-France
- Department: Seine-et-Marne
- Arrondissement: Provins
- Canton: Provins
- Intercommunality: CC Bassée - Montois

Government
  - Mayor (2020–2026): Michel Poulain
- Area^{1}: 20.81 km^{2} (8.03 sq mi)
- Highest elevation: 138 m (453 ft)
- Lowest elevation: 56 m (184 ft)
- Population (2023): 453
  - Density: 21.8/km^{2} (56.4/sq mi)
- Time zone: UTC+01:00 (CET)
  - Summer (DST): UTC+02:00 (CEST)
- INSEE/Postal code: 77507 /77480
- ^{1} French Land Register data, which excludes lakes, ponds, glaciers > 1 km^{2} (0.386 sq mi or 247 acres) and river estuaries.

Villenauxe-la-Petite (French pronunciation: [vilnoks la pətit]) is a commune in the Seine-et-Marne department in the Île-de-France region in north-central France.

== Demographics ==
Inhabitants of Villenauxe-la-Petite are called Villenauxois.

== See also ==
- Communes of the Seine-et-Marne department
