= La Tombe =

- Commune
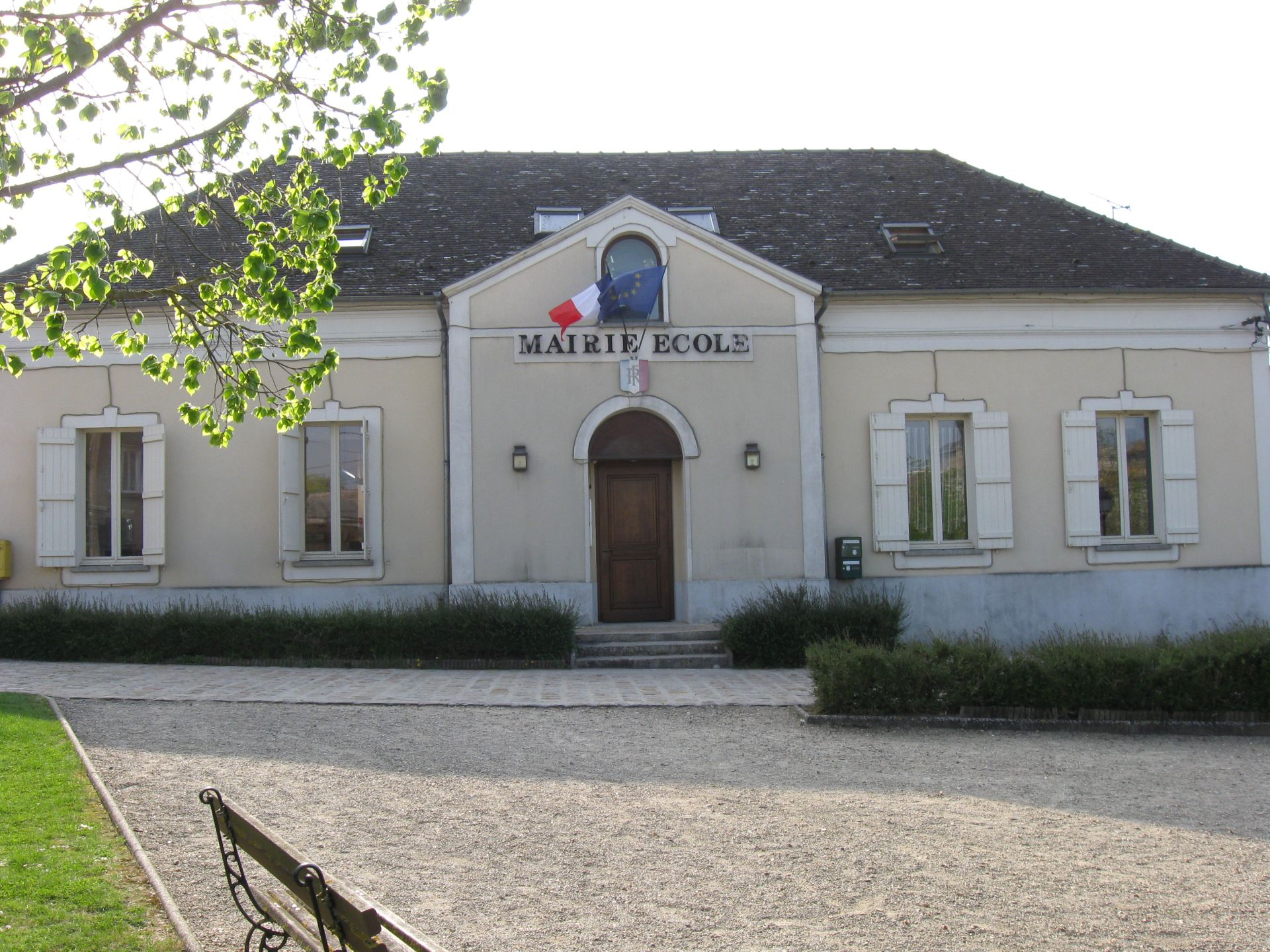
- The town hall in La Tombe

- Coat of arms
- Location of La Tombe
- Location within France Location within Île-de-France (region)
- Coordinates: 48°23′16″N 3°05′27″E
- Country: France
- Region: Île-de-France
- Department: Seine-et-Marne
- Arrondissement: Provins
- Canton: Provins
- Intercommunality: CC Bassée - Montois

Government
  - Mayor (2020–2026): Marc Chauvin
- Area^{1}: 7.84 km^{2} (3.03 sq mi)
- Highest elevation: 86 m (282 ft)
- Lowest elevation: 49 m (161 ft)
- Population (2023): 208
  - Density: 26.5/km^{2} (68.7/sq mi)
- Time zone: UTC+01:00 (CET)
  - Summer (DST): UTC+02:00 (CEST)
- INSEE/Postal code: 77467 /77130
- ^{1} French Land Register data, which excludes lakes, ponds, glaciers > 1 km^{2} (0.386 sq mi or 247 acres) and river estuaries.

La Tombe (French pronunciation: [la tɔ̃b]) is a commune in the Seine-et-Marne department in the Île-de-France region in north-central France.

== Demographics ==
Inhabitants of La Tombe are called Latombiers.

== See also ==
- Communes of the Seine-et-Marne department
