= Villuis =

- Commune
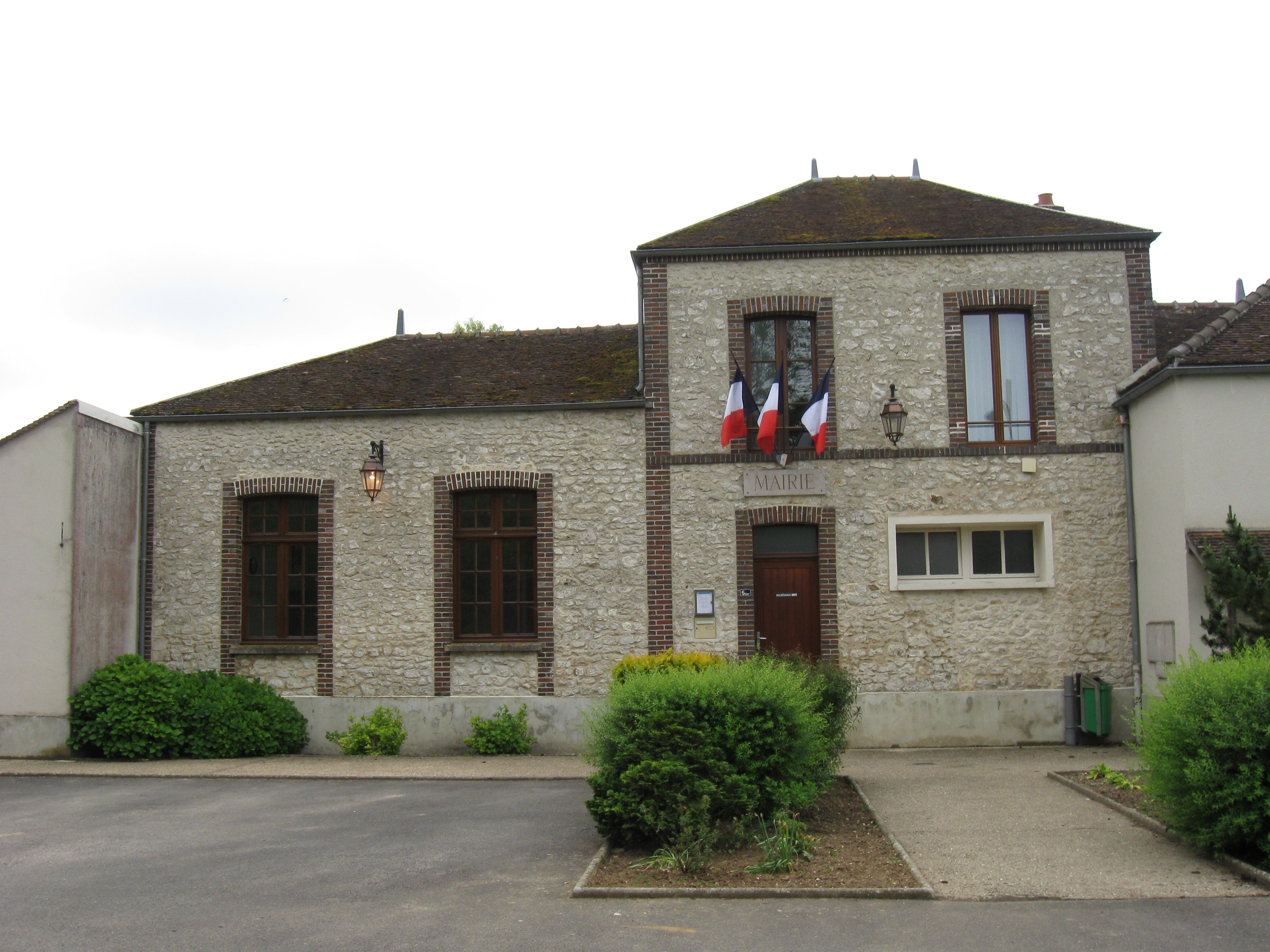
- The town hall in Villuis
- Location of Villuis
- Location within France Location within Île-de-France (region)
- Coordinates: 48°24′39″N 3°21′20″E
- Country: France
- Region: Île-de-France
- Department: Seine-et-Marne
- Arrondissement: Provins
- Canton: Provins
- Intercommunality: CC Bassée - Montois

Government
  - Mayor (2020–2026): Joel Pachot
- Area^{1}: 9.26 km^{2} (3.58 sq mi)
- Highest elevation: 147 m (482 ft)
- Lowest elevation: 62 m (203 ft)
- Population (2023): 272
  - Density: 29.4/km^{2} (76.1/sq mi)
- Time zone: UTC+01:00 (CET)
  - Summer (DST): UTC+02:00 (CEST)
- INSEE/Postal code: 77523 /77480
- ^{1} French Land Register data, which excludes lakes, ponds, glaciers > 1 km^{2} (0.386 sq mi or 247 acres) and river estuaries.

Villuis is a commune in the Seine-et-Marne department in the Île-de-France region in north-central France.

== Demographics ==
Inhabitants of Villuis are called Villuisiens.

== See also ==
- Communes of the Seine-et-Marne department
