= Everly, Seine-et-Marne =

Everly
- Commune
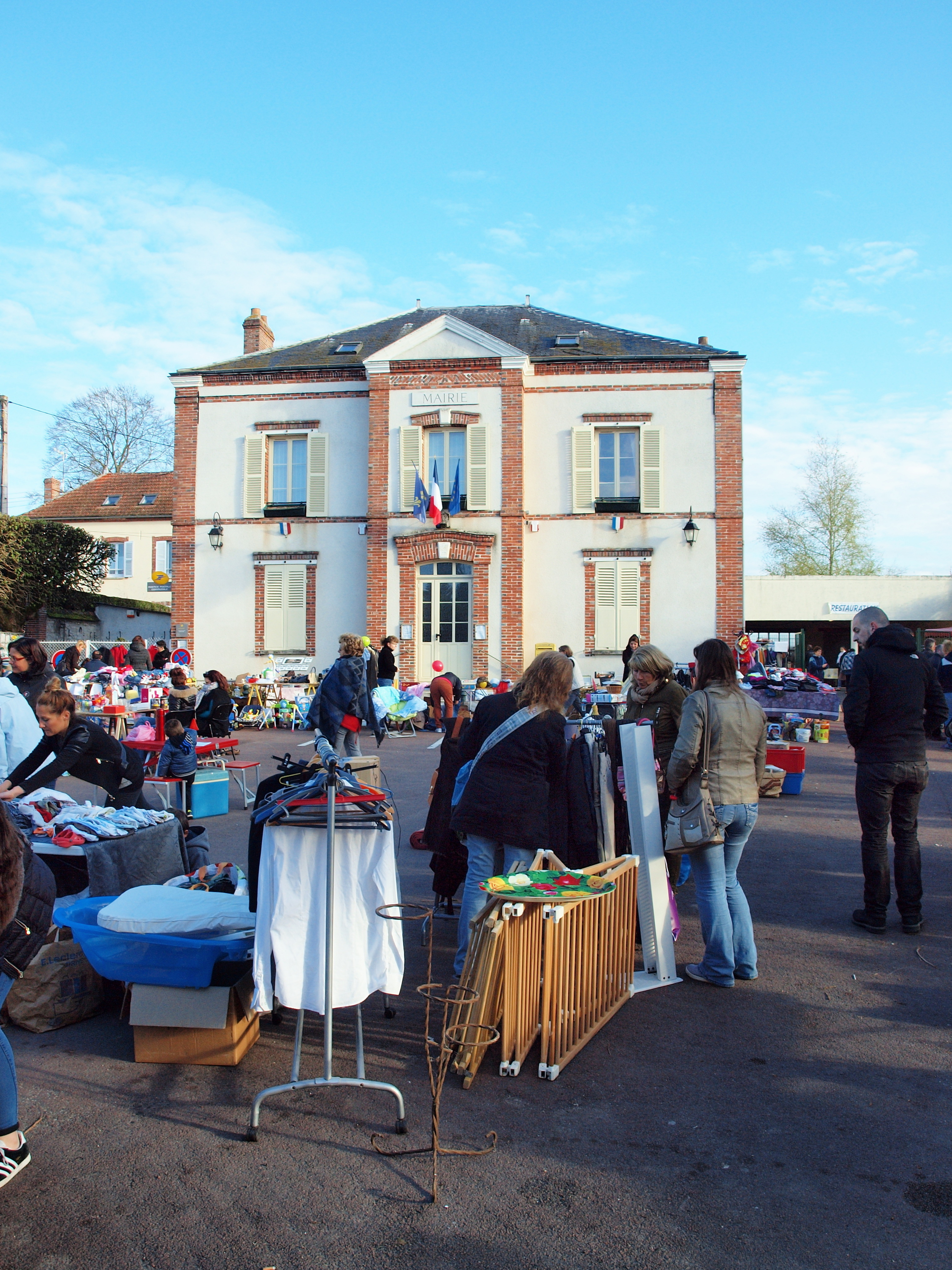
- The town hall in Everly
- Location of Everly
- Location within France Location within Île-de-France (region)
- Coordinates: 48°28′01″N 3°14′59″E
- Country: France
- Region: Île-de-France
- Department: Seine-et-Marne
- Arrondissement: Provins
- Canton: Provins
- Intercommunality: CC Bassée - Montois

Government
  - Mayor (2020–2026): Laurence Guerinot
- Area^{1}: 8.76 km^{2} (3.38 sq mi)
- Highest elevation: 81 m (266 ft)
- Lowest elevation: 54 m (177 ft)
- Population (2023): 566
  - Density: 64.6/km^{2} (167/sq mi)
- Time zone: UTC+01:00 (CET)
  - Summer (DST): UTC+02:00 (CEST)
- INSEE/Postal code: 77174 /77157
- ^{1} French Land Register data, which excludes lakes, ponds, glaciers > 1 km^{2} (0.386 sq mi or 247 acres) and river estuaries.

Everly (French pronunciation: [evɛʁli]) is a commune in the Seine-et-Marne department in the Île-de-France region in north-central France.

== Demographics ==
Inhabitants of Everly are called Everlytois in French.

== See also ==
- Communes of the Seine-et-Marne department
