= Fontaine-Fourches =

- Commune
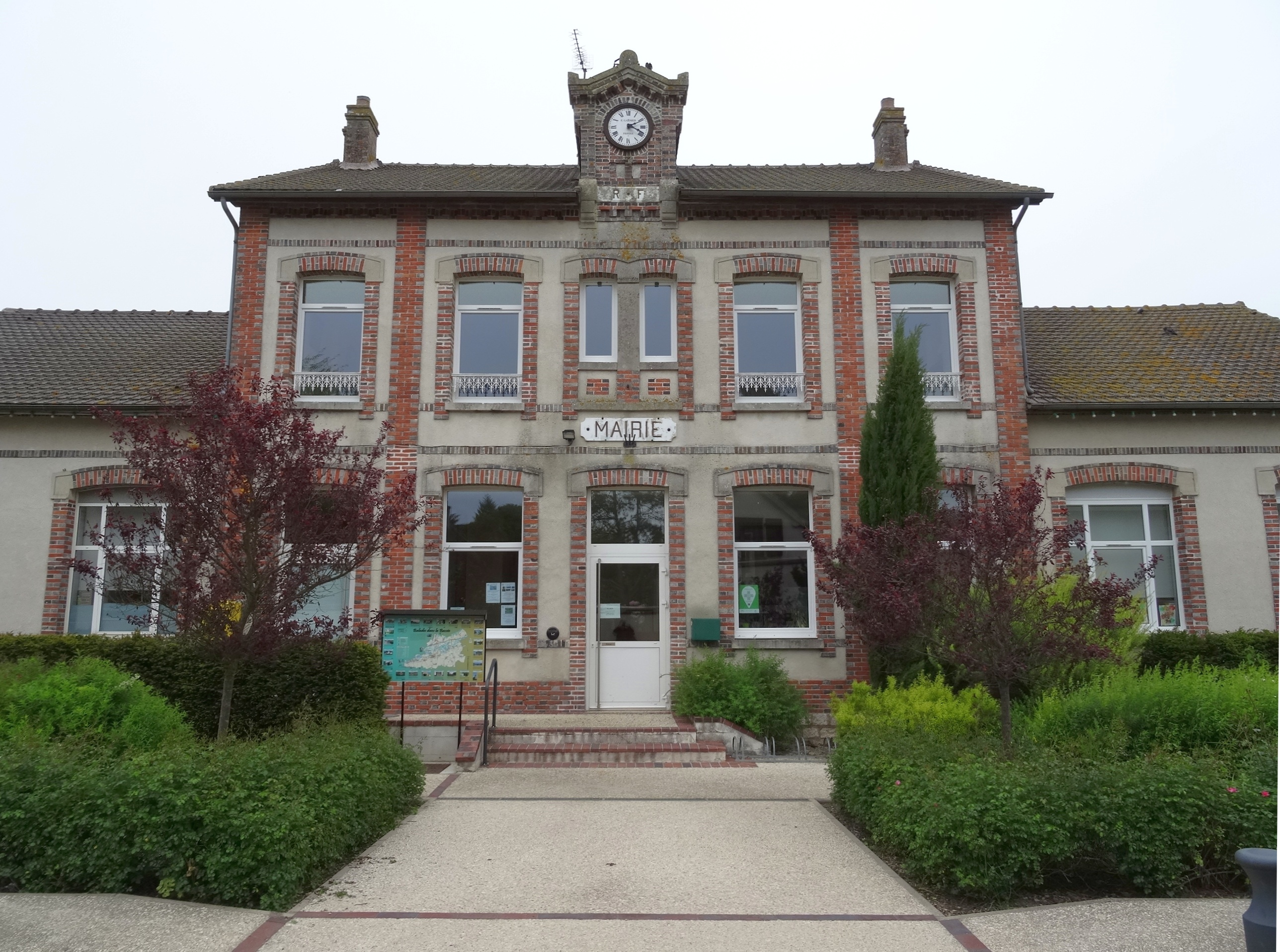
- The town hall in Fontaine-Fourches
- Location of Fontaine-Fourches
- Location within France Location within Île-de-France (region)
- Coordinates: 48°24′39″N 3°24′05″E
- Country: France
- Region: Île-de-France
- Department: Seine-et-Marne
- Arrondissement: Provins
- Canton: Provins
- Intercommunality: CC Bassée - Montois

Government
  - Mayor (2020–2026): Xavier Lamotte
- Area^{1}: 11.84 km^{2} (4.57 sq mi)
- Highest elevation: 142 m (466 ft)
- Lowest elevation: 61 m (200 ft)
- Population (2023): 576
  - Density: 48.6/km^{2} (126/sq mi)
- Time zone: UTC+01:00 (CET)
  - Summer (DST): UTC+02:00 (CEST)
- INSEE/Postal code: 77187 /77480
- ^{1} French Land Register data, which excludes lakes, ponds, glaciers > 1 km^{2} (0.386 sq mi or 247 acres) and river estuaries.

Fontaine-Fourches is a commune in the Seine-et-Marne department in the Île-de-France region in north-central France.

== Demographics ==
Inhabitants of Fontaine-Fourches are called Fourchois.

== See also ==
- Communes of the Seine-et-Marne department
