= Mouy-sur-Seine =

- Commune
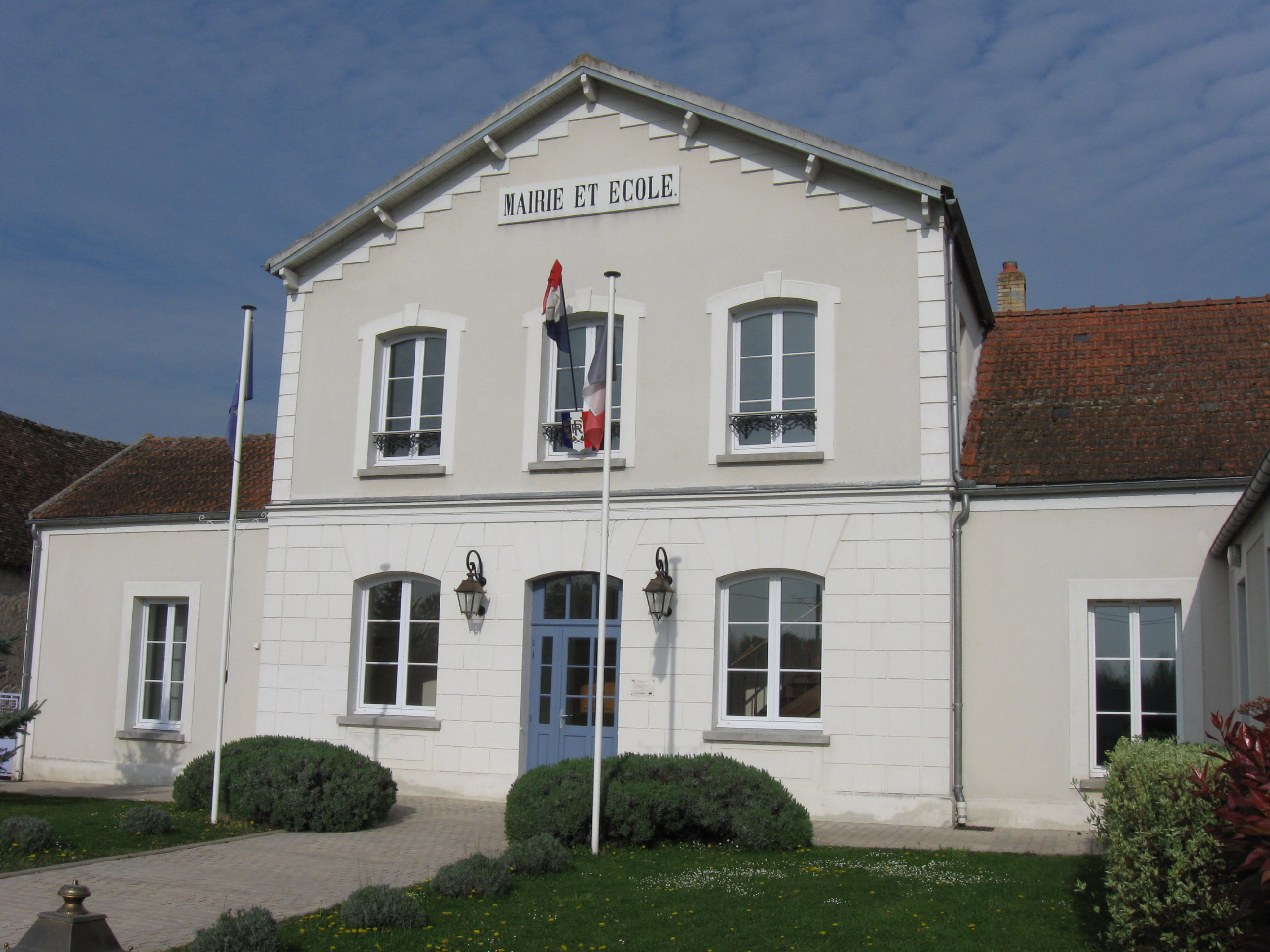
- The town hall in Mouy-sur-Seine
- Location of Mouy-sur-Seine
- Location within France Location within Île-de-France (region)
- Coordinates: 48°25′11″N 3°14′31″E
- Country: France
- Region: Île-de-France
- Department: Seine-et-Marne
- Arrondissement: Provins
- Canton: Provins
- Intercommunality: CC de la Bassée - Montois

Government
  - Mayor (2020–2026): Gérard Carrasco
- Area^{1}: 8.62 km^{2} (3.33 sq mi)
- Highest elevation: 58 m (190 ft)
- Lowest elevation: 52 m (171 ft)
- Population (2023): 353
  - Density: 41.0/km^{2} (106/sq mi)
- Demonym: Mouytois
- Time zone: UTC+01:00 (CET)
  - Summer (DST): UTC+02:00 (CEST)
- INSEE/Postal code: 77325 /77480
- Website: mouy-sur-seine.fr
- ^{1} French Land Register data, which excludes lakes, ponds, glaciers > 1 km^{2} (0.386 sq mi or 247 acres) and river estuaries.

Mouy-sur-Seine (French pronunciation: [mwi syʁ sɛn]; lit. 'Mouy-on-Seine') is a rural commune in the Seine-et-Marne department in the Île-de-France region in north-central France.

== Demographics ==
Inhabitants are called Mouytois.

== See also ==
- Communes of the Seine-et-Marne department
