= Grisy-sur-Seine =

- Commune
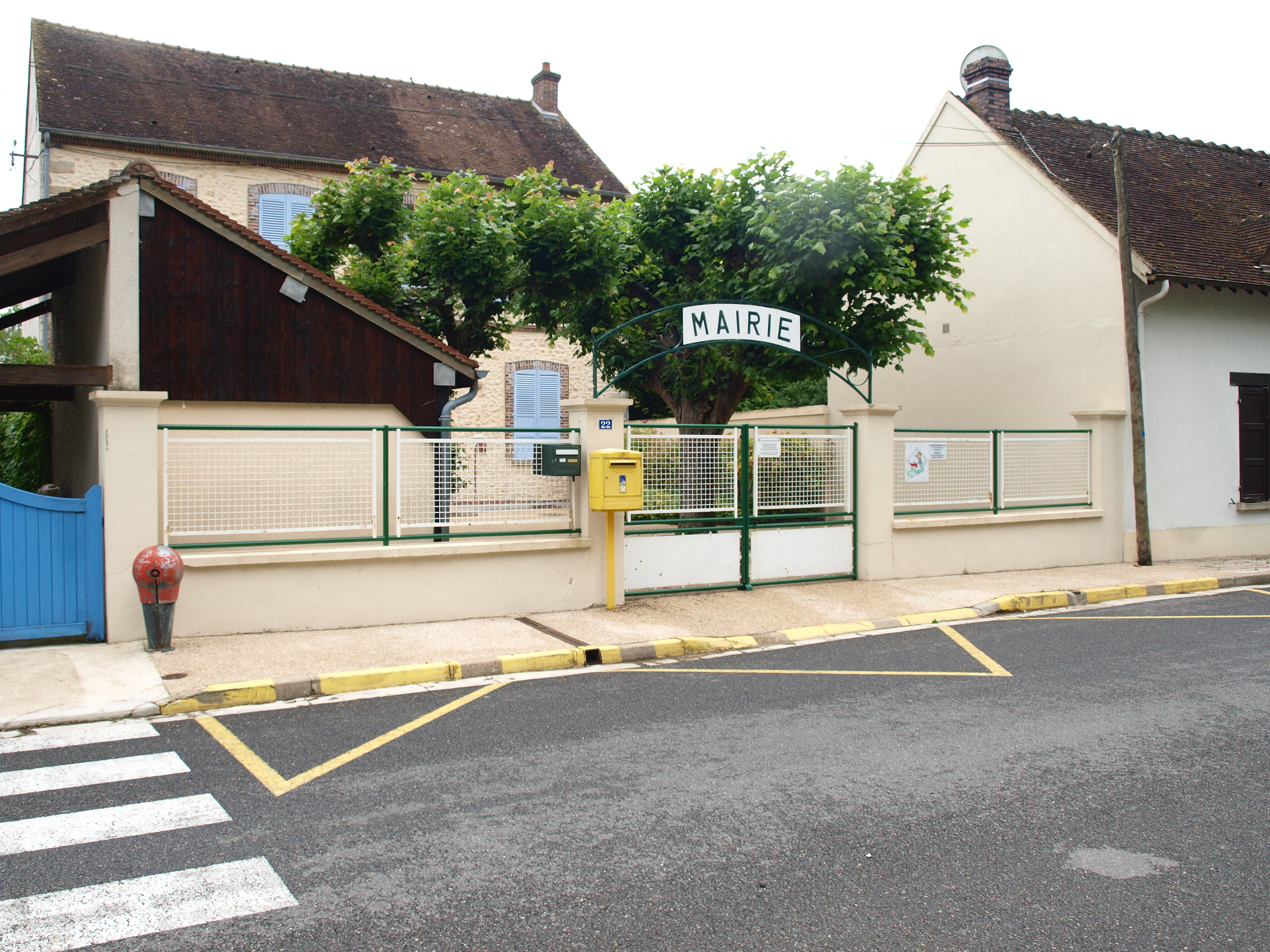
- The town hall in Grisy-sur-Seine
- Location of Grisy-sur-Seine
- Location within France Location within Île-de-France (region)
- Coordinates: 48°26′21″N 3°19′03″E
- Country: France
- Region: Île-de-France
- Department: Seine-et-Marne
- Arrondissement: Provins
- Canton: Provins
- Intercommunality: CC Bassée - Montois

Government
  - Mayor (2021–2026): Martine Flon
- Area^{1}: 6.57 km^{2} (2.54 sq mi)
- Highest elevation: 67 m (220 ft)
- Lowest elevation: 54 m (177 ft)
- Population (2023): 123
  - Density: 18.7/km^{2} (48.5/sq mi)
- Time zone: UTC+01:00 (CET)
  - Summer (DST): UTC+02:00 (CEST)
- INSEE/Postal code: 77218 /77480
- ^{1} French Land Register data, which excludes lakes, ponds, glaciers > 1 km^{2} (0.386 sq mi or 247 acres) and river estuaries.

Grisy-sur-Seine (French pronunciation: [ɡʁizi syʁ sɛn], literally Grisy on Seine) is a commune in the Seine-et-Marne department in the Île-de-France region in north-central France.

== Demographics ==
Inhabitants are called Grisones.

== See also ==
- Communes of the Seine-et-Marne department
