= Balloy =

- Commune
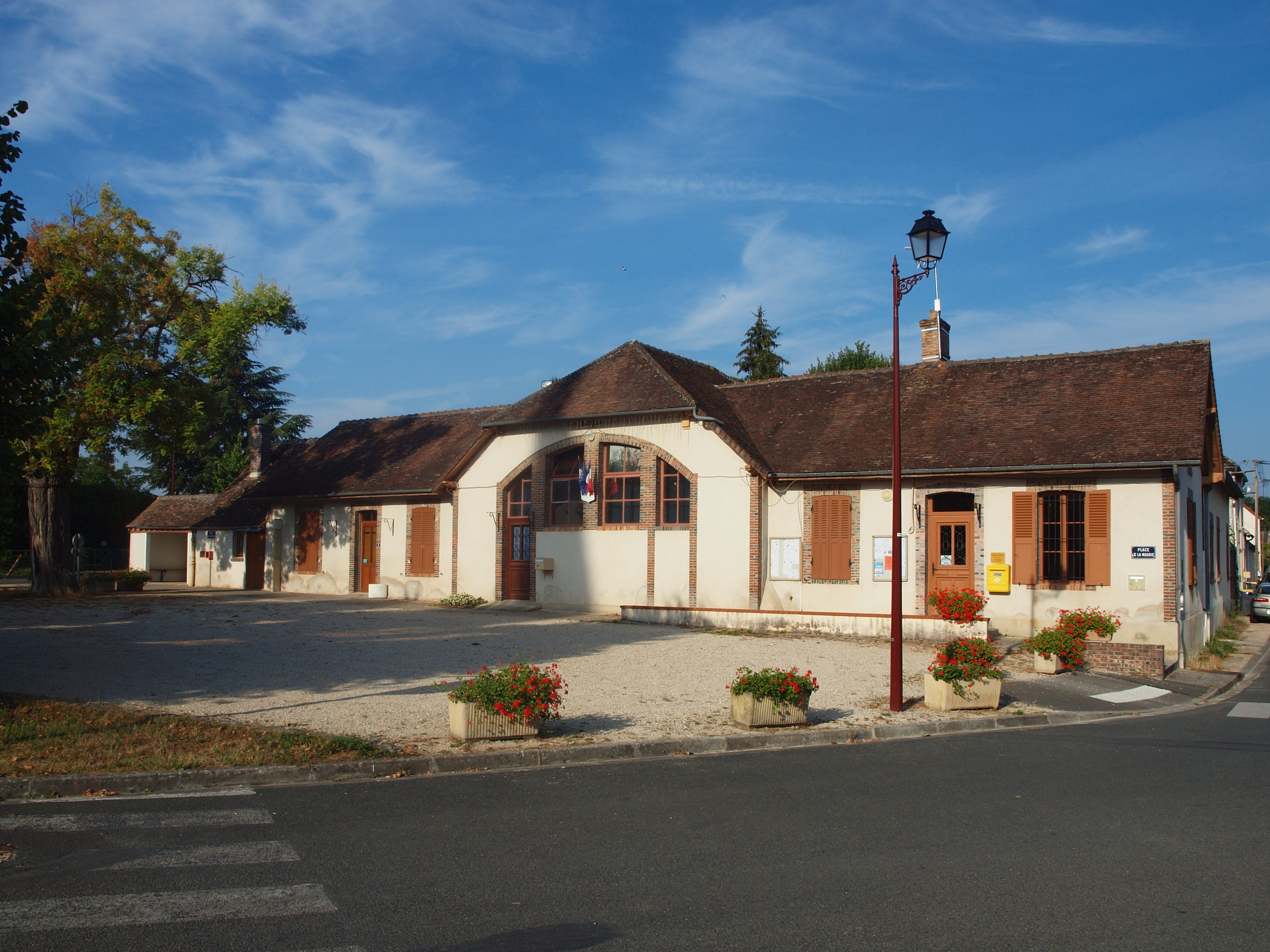
- The town hall in Balloy

- Coat of arms
- Location of Balloy
- Location within France Location within Île-de-France (region)
- Coordinates: 48°23′50″N 3°08′50″E
- Country: France
- Region: Île-de-France
- Department: Seine-et-Marne
- Arrondissement: Provins
- Canton: Provins
- Intercommunality: CC Bassée - Montois

Government
  - Mayor (2020–2026): Pascal Camuset
- Area^{1}: 13.22 km^{2} (5.10 sq mi)
- Highest elevation: 118 m (387 ft)
- Lowest elevation: 50 m (160 ft)
- Population (2023): 359
  - Density: 27.2/km^{2} (70.3/sq mi)
- Time zone: UTC+01:00 (CET)
  - Summer (DST): UTC+02:00 (CEST)
- INSEE/Postal code: 77019 /77118
- ^{1} French Land Register data, which excludes lakes, ponds, glaciers > 1 km^{2} (0.386 sq mi or 247 acres) and river estuaries.

Balloy (French pronunciation: [balwa]) is a commune in the Seine-et-Marne department in the Île-de-France region in north-central France.

== Demographics ==
The inhabitants are called Balloyeux.

== See also ==
- Communes of the Seine-et-Marne department
