= Bazoches-lès-Bray =

- Commune
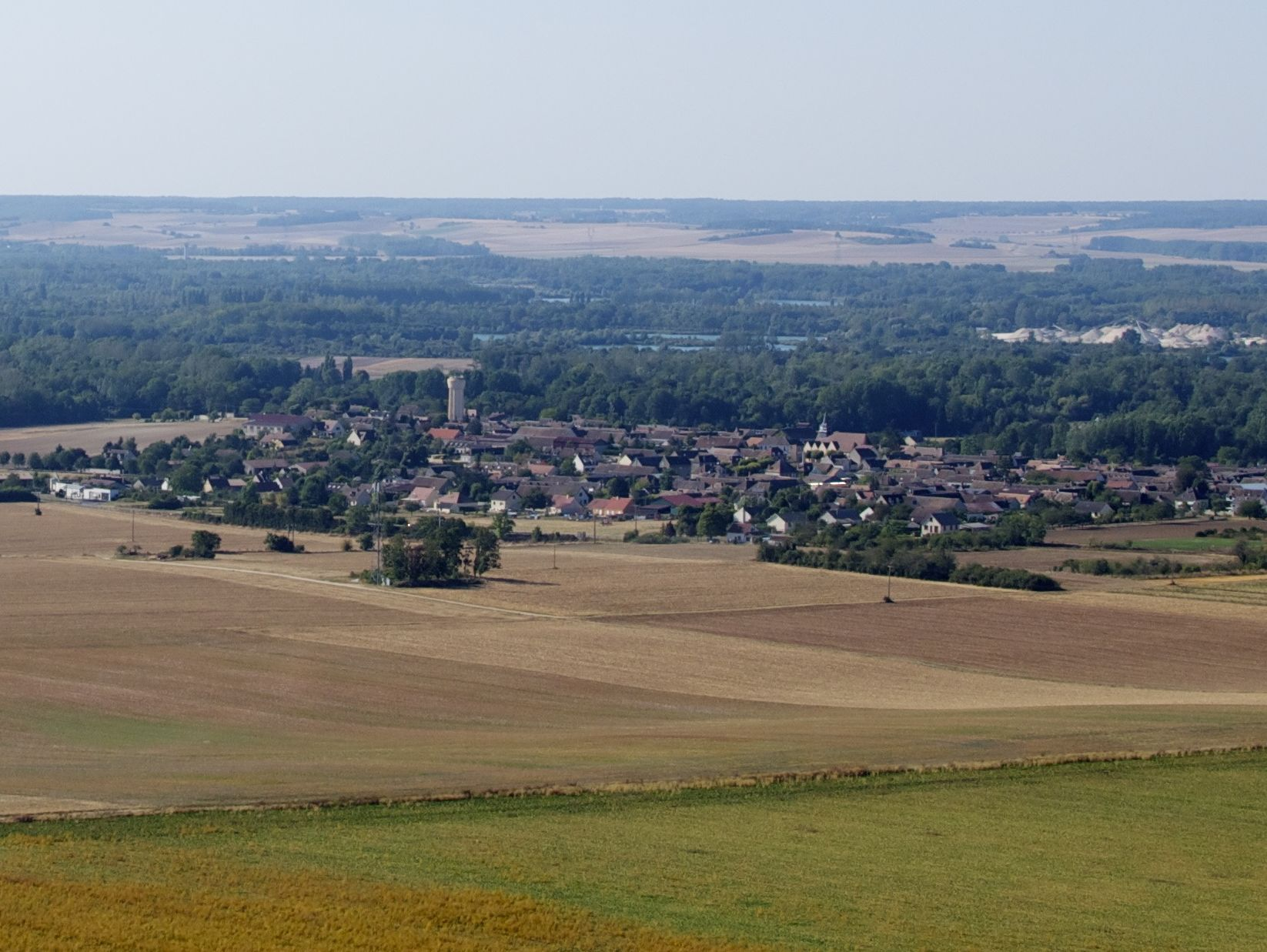
- A general view of Bazoches

- Coat of arms
- Location of Bazoches-lès-Bray
- Location within France Location within Île-de-France (region)
- Coordinates: 48°23′58″N 3°11′21″E
- Country: France
- Region: Île-de-France
- Department: Seine-et-Marne
- Arrondissement: Provins
- Canton: Provins
- Intercommunality: CC Bassée - Montois

Government
  - Mayor (2020–2026): Jean-Luc Chaplot
- Area^{1}: 22.68 km^{2} (8.76 sq mi)
- Highest elevation: 129 m (423 ft)
- Lowest elevation: 50 m (160 ft)
- Population (2023): 878
  - Density: 38.7/km^{2} (100/sq mi)
- Time zone: UTC+01:00 (CET)
  - Summer (DST): UTC+02:00 (CEST)
- INSEE/Postal code: 77025 /77118
- ^{1} French Land Register data, which excludes lakes, ponds, glaciers > 1 km^{2} (0.386 sq mi or 247 acres) and river estuaries.

Bazoches-lès-Bray (French pronunciation: [bazɔʃ lɛ bʁɛ], literally Bazoches near Bray) is a commune in the Seine-et-Marne department in the Île-de-France region in north-central France.

== Demographics ==
The inhabitants are called Bazochois.

== See also ==
- Communes of the Seine-et-Marne department
