= Passy-sur-Seine =

- Commune
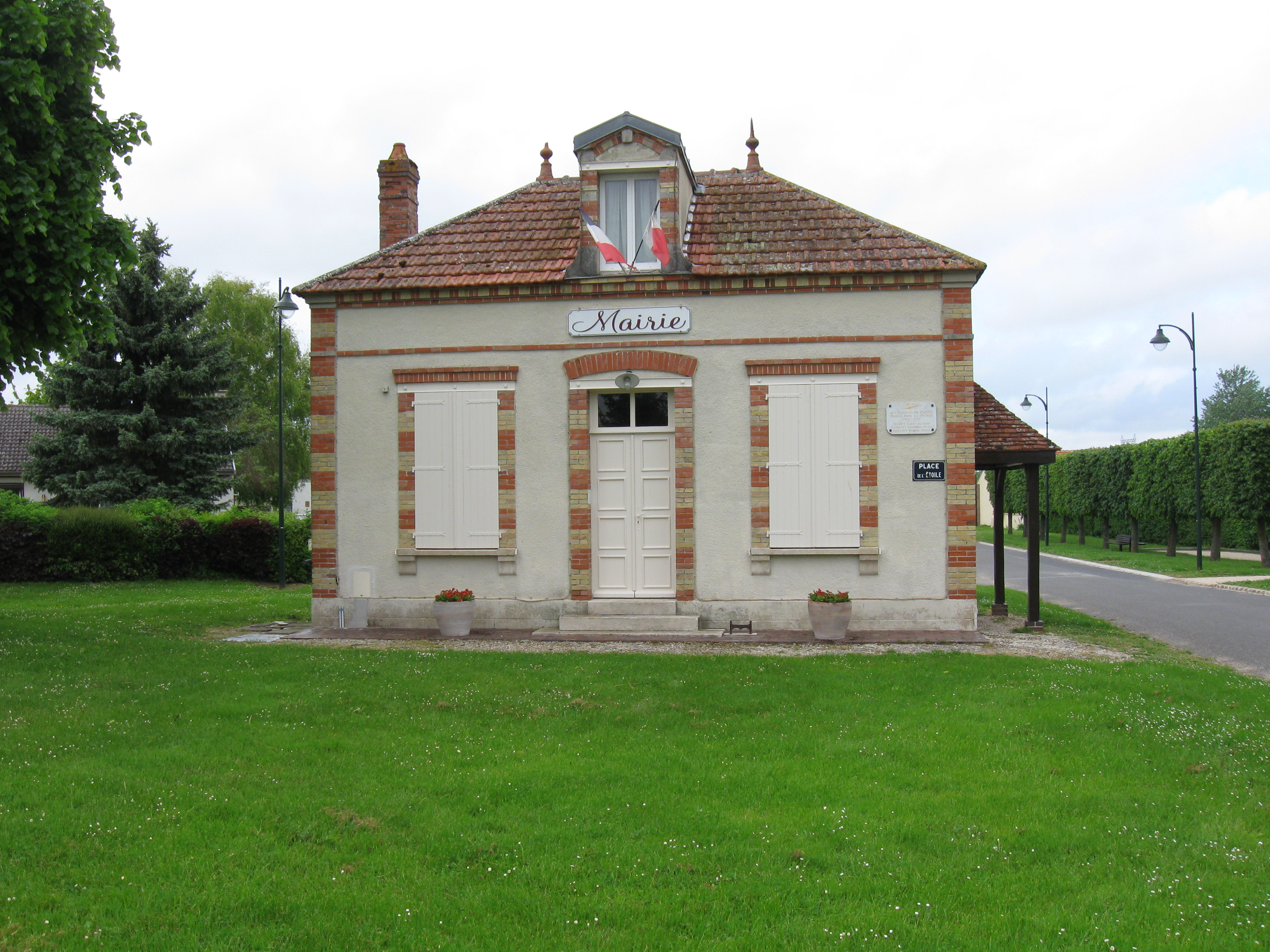
- The town hall in Passy-sur-Seine
- Location of Passy-sur-Seine
- Location within France Location within Île-de-France (region)
- Coordinates: 48°25′30″N 3°20′58″E
- Country: France
- Region: Île-de-France
- Department: Seine-et-Marne
- Arrondissement: Provins
- Canton: Provins
- Intercommunality: CC Bassée - Montois

Government
  - Mayor (2020–2026): Florence Benoit
- Area^{1}: 4.53 km^{2} (1.75 sq mi)
- Highest elevation: 74 m (243 ft)
- Lowest elevation: 60 m (200 ft)
- Population (2023): 49
  - Density: 11/km^{2} (28/sq mi)
- Time zone: UTC+01:00 (CET)
  - Summer (DST): UTC+02:00 (CEST)
- INSEE/Postal code: 77356 /77480
- ^{1} French Land Register data, which excludes lakes, ponds, glaciers > 1 km^{2} (0.386 sq mi or 247 acres) and river estuaries.

Passy-sur-Seine (French pronunciation: [pasi syʁ sɛn], literally Passy on Seine) is a commune in the Seine-et-Marne department in the Île-de-France region in north-central France.

== Demographics ==
Inhabitants are called Passytois.

== See also ==
- Communes of the Seine-et-Marne department
