= Les Ormes-sur-Voulzie =

- Commune
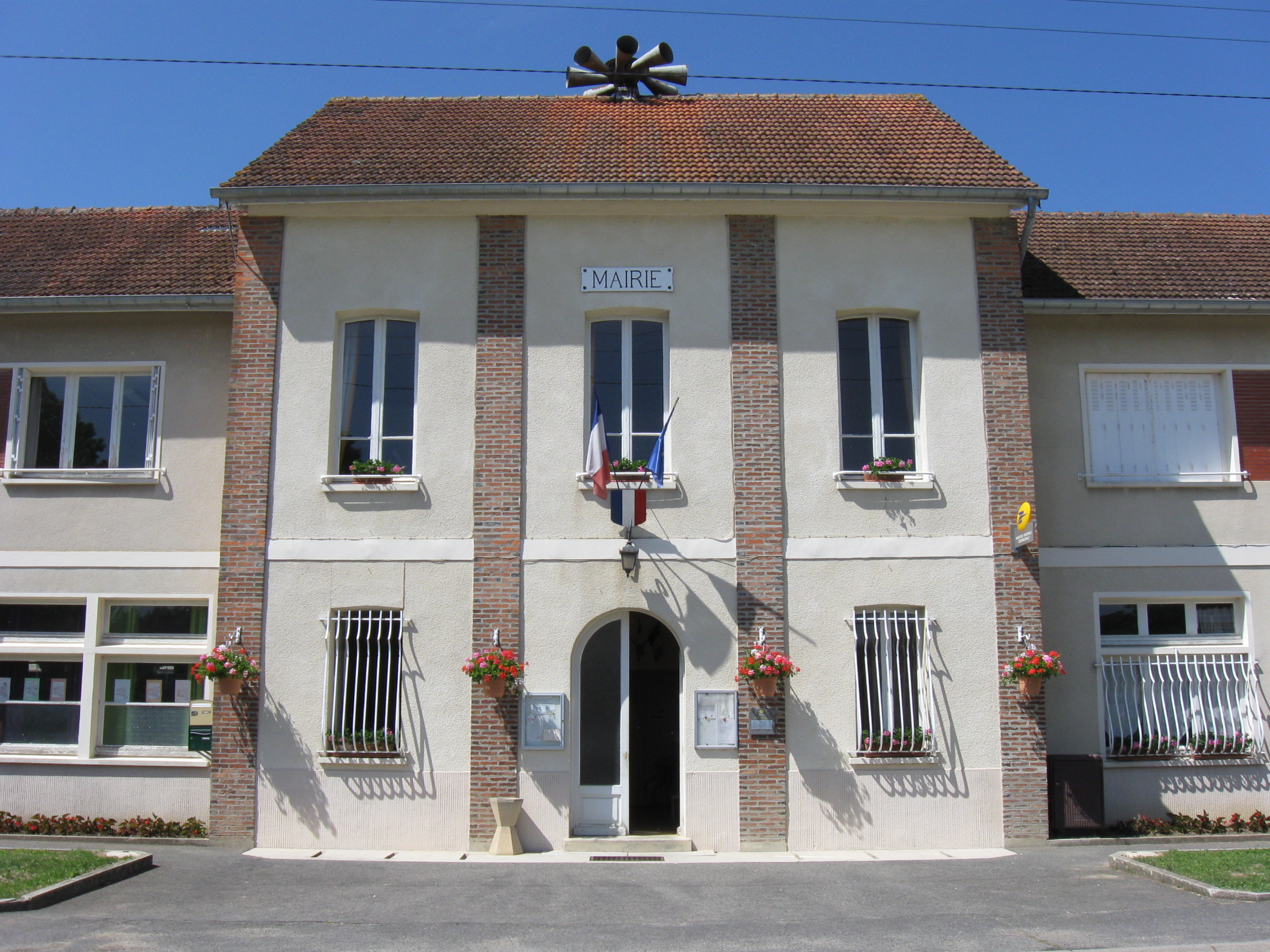
- The town hall in Les Ormes-sur-Voulzie

- Coat of arms
- Location of Les Ormes-sur-Voulzie
- Location within France Location within Île-de-France (region)
- Coordinates: 48°27′46″N 3°13′43″E
- Country: France
- Region: Île-de-France
- Department: Seine-et-Marne
- Arrondissement: Provins
- Canton: Provins
- Intercommunality: CC Bassée - Montois

Government
  - Mayor (2020–2026): Yannick Maury
- Area^{1}: 12.22 km^{2} (4.72 sq mi)
- Highest elevation: 117 m (384 ft)
- Lowest elevation: 54 m (177 ft)
- Population (2023): 864
  - Density: 70.7/km^{2} (183/sq mi)
- Time zone: UTC+01:00 (CET)
  - Summer (DST): UTC+02:00 (CEST)
- INSEE/Postal code: 77347 /77134
- ^{1} French Land Register data, which excludes lakes, ponds, glaciers > 1 km^{2} (0.386 sq mi or 247 acres) and river estuaries.

Les Ormes-sur-Voulzie (French pronunciation: [le.z‿ɔʁm syʁ vulzi]) is a commune in the Seine-et-Marne department in the Île-de-France region in north-central France.

== Demographics ==
Inhabitants are called Ormois.

== See also ==
- Communes of the Seine-et-Marne department
