= Montigny-le-Guesdier =

- Commune
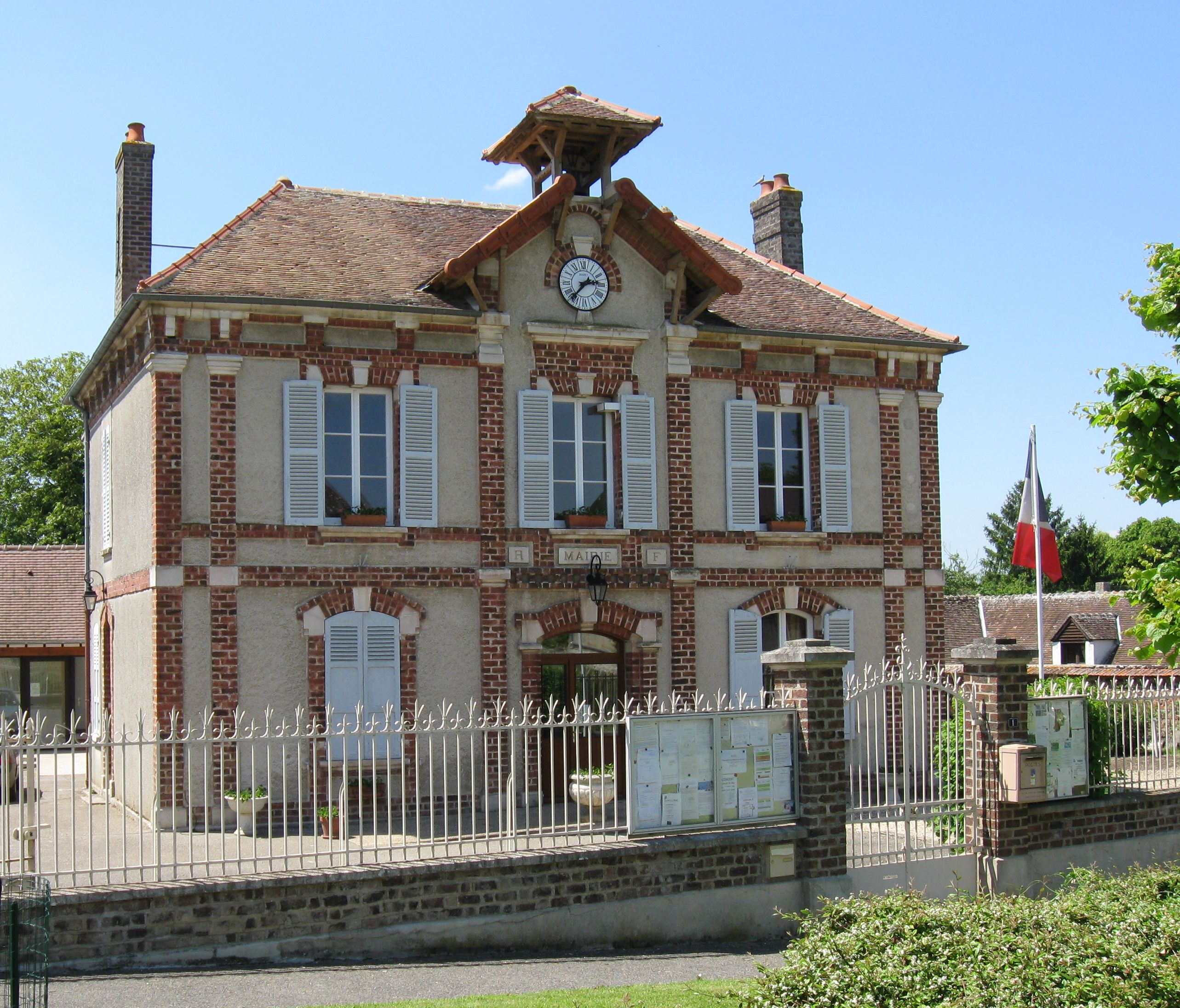
- The town hall in Montigny-le-Guesdier
- Location of Montigny-le-Guesdier
- Location within France Location within Île-de-France (region)
- Coordinates: 48°23′00″N 3°15′18″E
- Country: France
- Region: Île-de-France
- Department: Seine-et-Marne
- Arrondissement: Provins
- Canton: Provins
- Intercommunality: CC Bassée - Montois

Government
  - Mayor (2020–2026): Evelyne Sivanne
- Area^{1}: 7.89 km^{2} (3.05 sq mi)
- Highest elevation: 136 m (446 ft)
- Lowest elevation: 64 m (210 ft)
- Population (2023): 295
  - Density: 37.4/km^{2} (96.8/sq mi)
- Time zone: UTC+01:00 (CET)
  - Summer (DST): UTC+02:00 (CEST)
- INSEE/Postal code: 77310 /77480
- ^{1} French Land Register data, which excludes lakes, ponds, glaciers > 1 km^{2} (0.386 sq mi or 247 acres) and river estuaries.

Montigny-le-Guesdier is a commune in the Seine-et-Marne department in the Île-de-France region in north-central France.

== See also ==
- Communes of the Seine-et-Marne department
