= Gouaix =

- Commune
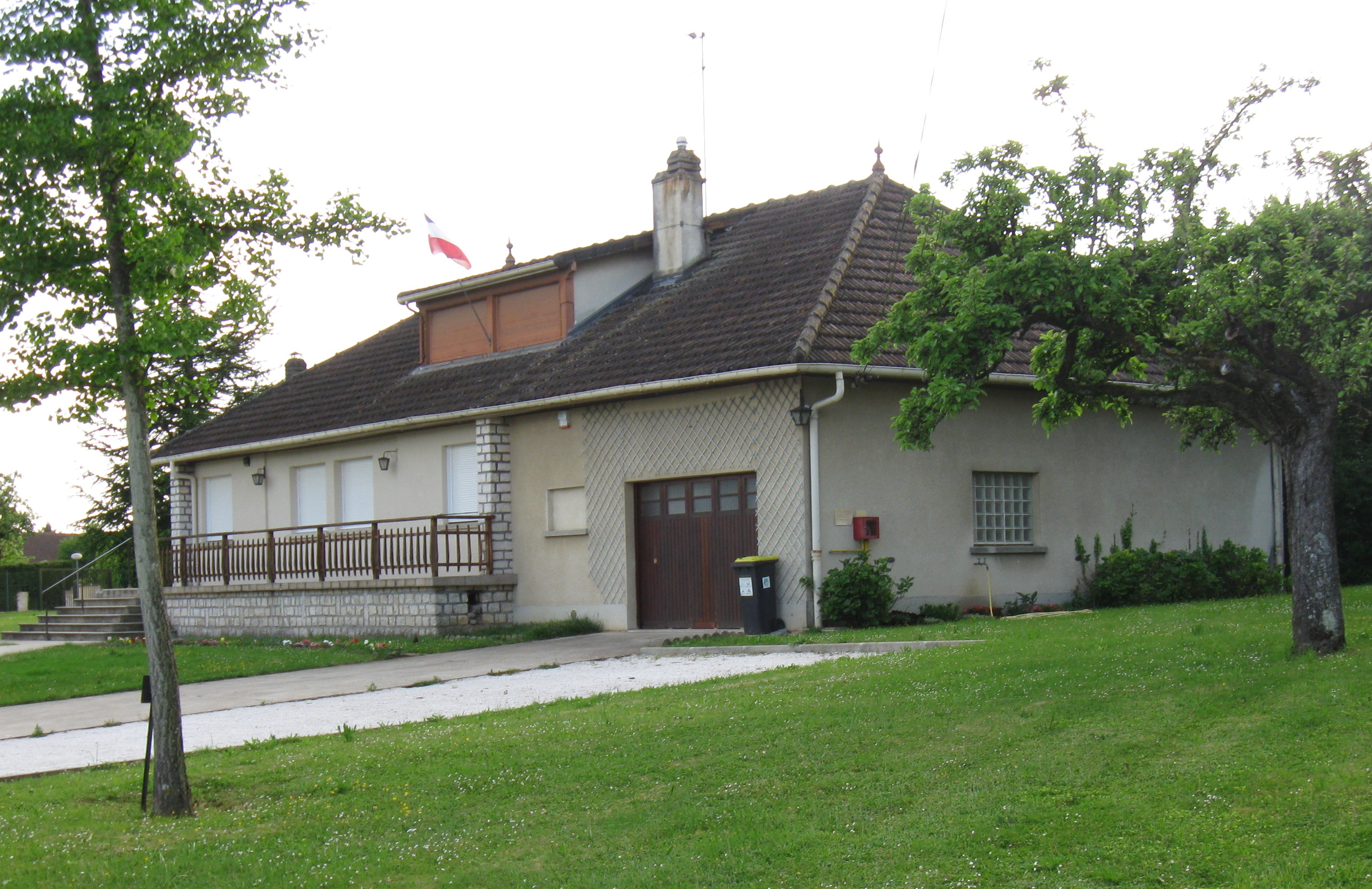
- The town hall in Gouaix
- Location of Gouaix
- Location within France Location within Île-de-France (region)
- Coordinates: 48°29′11″N 3°17′34″E
- Country: France
- Region: Île-de-France
- Department: Seine-et-Marne
- Arrondissement: Provins
- Canton: Provins
- Intercommunality: CC Bassée - Montois

Government
  - Mayor (2020–2026): Jean-Paul Fenot
- Area^{1}: 14.64 km^{2} (5.65 sq mi)
- Highest elevation: 162 m (531 ft)
- Lowest elevation: 54 m (177 ft)
- Population (2023): 1,299
  - Density: 88.73/km^{2} (229.8/sq mi)
- Time zone: UTC+01:00 (CET)
  - Summer (DST): UTC+02:00 (CEST)
- INSEE/Postal code: 77208 /77114
- ^{1} French Land Register data, which excludes lakes, ponds, glaciers > 1 km^{2} (0.386 sq mi or 247 acres) and river estuaries.

Gouaix (French pronunciation: [ɡwɛ]) is a commune in the Seine-et-Marne department in the Île-de-France region in north-central France.

== Demographics ==
Inhabitants are called Gouaillons.

== See also ==
- Communes of the Seine-et-Marne department
