= Bray-sur-Seine =

- Commune
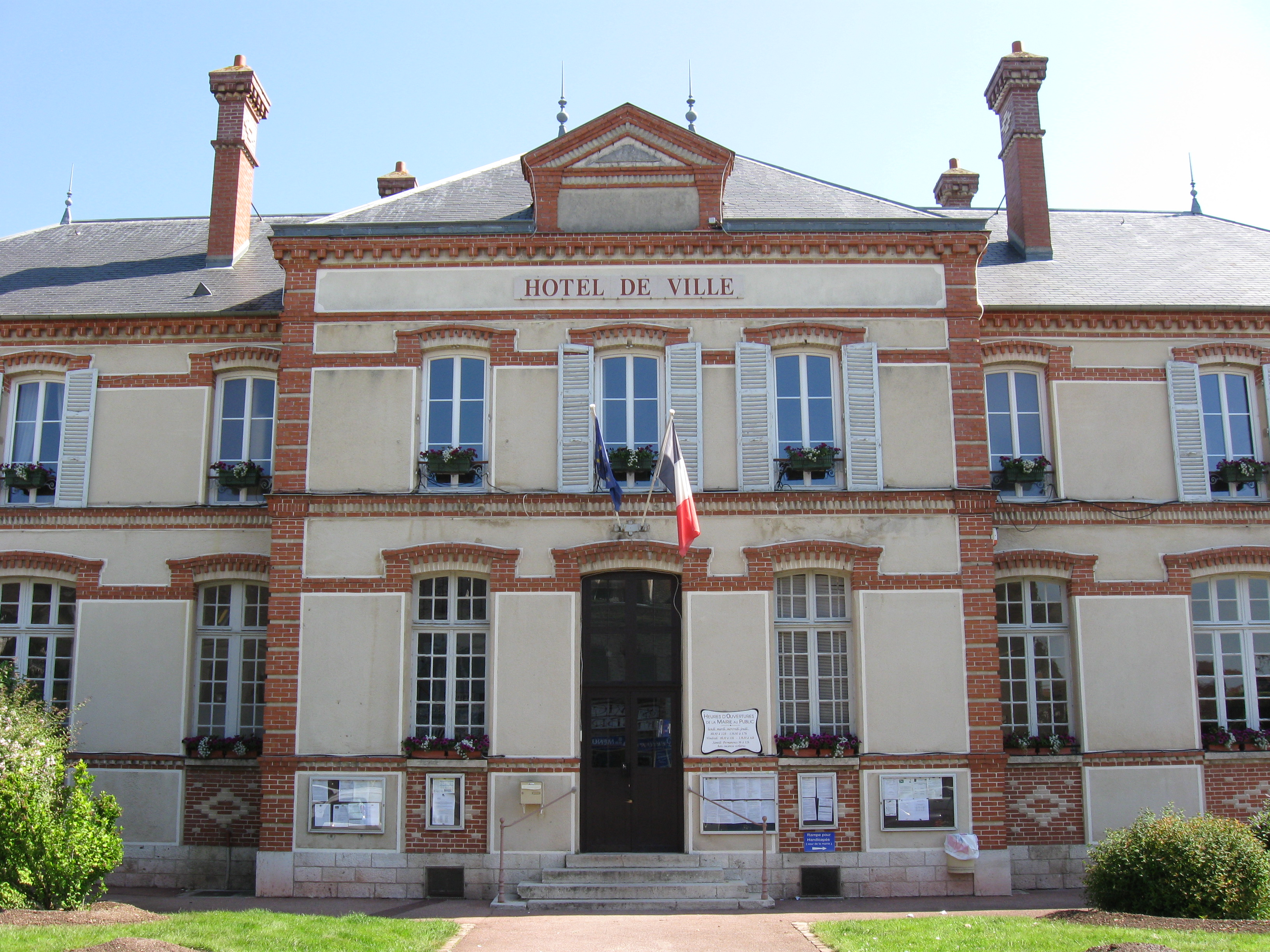
- The town hall in Bray-sur-Seine

- Coat of arms
- Location of Bray-sur-Seine
- Location within France Location within Île-de-France (region)
- Coordinates: 48°24′35″N 3°17′57″E
- Country: France
- Region: Île-de-France
- Department: Seine-et-Marne
- Arrondissement: Provins
- Canton: Provins
- Intercommunality: CC de la Bassée - Montois

Government
  - Mayor (2020–2026): Alain Carrasco
- Area^{1}: 3.5 km^{2} (1.4 sq mi)
- Highest elevation: 82 m (269 ft)
- Lowest elevation: 54 m (177 ft)
- Population (2023): 2,344
  - Density: 670/km^{2} (1,700/sq mi)
- Demonym: Braytois
- Time zone: UTC+01:00 (CET)
  - Summer (DST): UTC+02:00 (CEST)
- INSEE/Postal code: 77051 /77480
- Website: www.bray-sur-seine.fr
- ^{1} French Land Register data, which excludes lakes, ponds, glaciers > 1 km^{2} (0.386 sq mi or 247 acres) and river estuaries.

Bray-sur-Seine (French pronunciation: [bʁɛ syʁ sɛn]; lit. 'Bray-on-Seine') is a rural commune in the Seine-et-Marne department in the Île-de-France region in north-central France.

== Population ==
Historical population
Year	Pop.	±% p.a.
1968	1,913	—
1975	2,085	+1.24%
1982	2,116	+0.21%
1990	2,238	+0.70%
1999	2,278	+0.20%
2007	2,182	−0.54%
2012	2,361	+1.59%
2017	2,243	−1.02%
2023	2,344	+0.74%
Source: INSEE

The inhabitants are called Braytois in French.

== Natives ==
- Nicholas of Bray (fl. 1226), French Latin poet, author of the epic Gesta Ludovici VIII
- Eugène Penancier, French politician, Minister of Justice and Deputy Prime Minister of France

== See also ==
- Communes of the Seine-et-Marne department
