= Betto (surname) =

Betto is a surname. Notable people with the surname include:

- Alice Betto (born 1987), Italian triathlete
- Frei Betto (born 1944), Brazilian writer and theologist
- Kaoru Betto (1920–1999), Japanese baseball player

== See also ==
- Blessed Betto (sixth century), father of St. Lupus of Sens
- Callie Betto (Dryad), a mutant character in Marvel Comics
