= Lupus of Sens =

Saint Loup
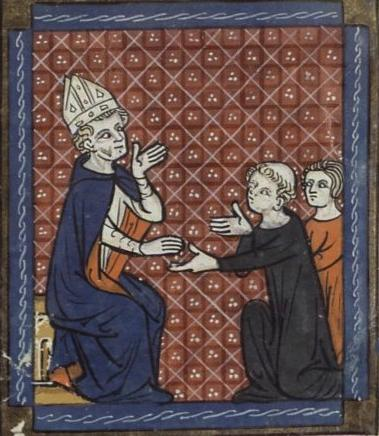
- Saint Lupus of Sens giving alms—from a 14th-century manuscript
- Born: Orléans, France
- Died: 623
- Venerated in: Roman Catholic Church; Eastern Orthodox Church
- Beatified: pre-congregation
- Feast: Sept. 1

Saint Lupus of Sens (or Saint Loup de Sens) (born c. 573; died c. 623) was the nineteenth bishop of Sens.

== Life ==
He was the son of Betton, Count of Tonnerre, "Blessed Betto," a member of the royal house of the Kingdom of Burgundy. He distinguished himself by his tact and firmness in dealing with the rival Merovingian Princes of his time.

== Church in Saint-Loup-de-Naud ==
The Romanesque church dedicated to Saint Loup at Naud, 8 km from Provins in Champagne in the east of France is distinguished by the outstanding sculptures in the porch of its great doorway, with an ambitious iconographic programme in which Saint Loup mediates entry into the mystery of the Trinity. About 980 AD, Sevinus, archbishop of Sens, made a gift to the Benedictine community of the abbey of Saint-Pierre-le-Vif at Sens of four altars in villa que dicitus Naudus, in honore sancti lupi consecratum—"in the demesne that is called Naud, consecrated in honour of Saint Loup"—signifying the presence of a shrine already on this site, a priory under the direction of the abbot of Saint-Pierre-le-Vif. Other documents mention Saint-Loup-de-Naud among the possessions of the abbey at Sens, seat of an archbishop with close political ties to the French Crown, who had Paris within his diocese. Therefore, although it lay so close to Provins, a seat of the counts of Champagne and the abbey church was completed by Henri le Libéral, comte de Champagne, the priory at Saint-Loup-de-Naud looked to Sens for its patronage: a visit from the abbot is documented in 1120. In 1160/61 Hugues de Toucy, Archbishop of Sens, presented to the priory the relic of Saint Loup, brought from the abbey of Sainte-Colombe, to that community's dismay; the sculpted portail with an iconography comparable to the royal portal at Chartres was doubtless undertaken shortly thereafter, when pilgrimages brought wealth to the community.

The priory was destroyed by the English in 1432, during the Hundred Years' War and again by the Huguenots in 1567, during the French Wars of Religion.
