= Château de Fontaine-Henry =

French Renaissance château in Normandy

- Fontaine-Henry
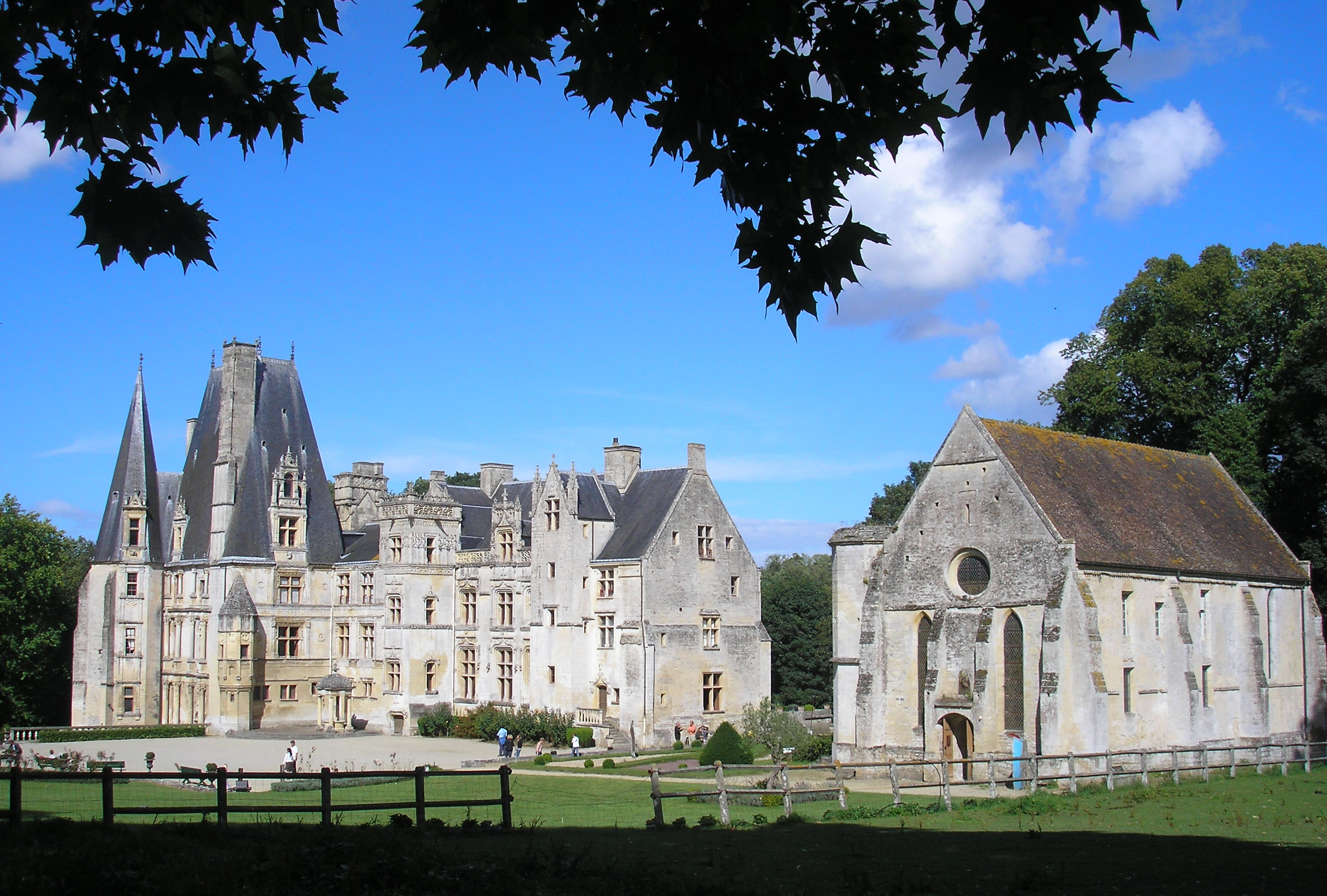
- View of the château and chapel.

Location
- Location within Calvados
- Coordinates: 49.2744°N 0.45°W

Site history
- Built: High Middle AgesNew project around 1500
- Built by: House of Tilly
- Architect: Le Prestre (mid-16th century)

The Château de Fontaine-Henry is a stately residence located in the French commune of Fontaine-Henry, in the Calvados department of Normandy. The building is listed as a Monument historique.

Described as a "Loire château lost in Normandy", the originally medieval structure is renowned for its façades, marked primarily by the Louis XII style and Renaissance styles. Owing to its high French roofs rising to nearly 15 metres (49 ft) on the quadrangular "Gros Pavillon", the château is also considered to possess some of the highest roofs in France.

== Location ==
The château is located on the road to Thaon, southeast of the village of Fontaine-Henry, near the Church of the Nativity of Our Lady, in the French department of Calvados.

== History ==
The Château de Fontaine-Henry is a family estate that has survived through the centuries while accumulating knowledge and objects. This continuity has been possible because the château has never been sold and has been passed down from generation to generation for approximately ten centuries.

As the estate passed from one owner to another through inheritance, several families have lived there over the years. These include the House of Harcourt family, a very powerful family close to the king; the Cornulier family, which left behind mementos of the French Revolution; and the d'Oilliamson family, the current owners of the château. Located near Bayeux, the estate owes its name to Henry de Tilly, son of a Grand Seneschal of Normandy, who took part in the Eighth Crusade.

On the site of an earlier fortress dating from the early 11th century, the de Tilly family had a new building constructed between 1200 and 1220. Notable remnants from this period include the chapel and the vaulted rooms that once formed the ground floor of the seigneurial residence, which still bear witness today to the full scale of the castle during the High Middle Ages.

The senior branch of the Tilly family transferred its lands to the House of Harcourt when Jeanne de Tilly married Philippe d'Harcourt in 1374, bringing several lordships, including Fontaine-Henry, as her dowry.

The Harcourt family reconstructed the château after the Hundred Years' War. Retaining the estate for five generations, they carried out works from the late 15th century to the 1560s, over nearly a century, giving the château its present appearance. Fontaine-Henry thus became a prestigious residence and acquired a remarkable harmony characteristic of the Louis XII style and the French Renaissance, comparable to the Hôtel d'Escoville and Hôtel de Than in Caen.

Later, a member of the Harcourt family brought the lordship by marriage into the Morais family, one of whose descendants married Françoise de Sévigné, daughter of Madame de Sévigné.

Until the 18th century, the road to Thaon continued to pass through its courtyard via a monumental gate on the south side named Gloria laus ("glory and praise"). From this perspective, the stone-carved facades—described as "the tallest in France"—were designed to impress visitors, even though their location eventually shifted to the center of the park following subsequent modifications to the entire estate.

During the 19th century, Henry de Carbonnel, Marquis de Canisy, inherited Fontaine-Henry. He commissioned the building housing the gallery and dining room, while the gardens were transformed into an English landscape garden.

The estate later passed to his adopted daughter, the Marquise de Cornulier, whose granddaughter married Count Pierre d'Oilliamson. At the beginning of the 20th century, they undertook a discreet restoration of the château..

The current owner, Marquis Pierre-Apollinaire d'Oilliamson, has widely opened the estate to tourism in order to promote its historical and artistic heritage. Visitors are invited to rediscover 800 years of history through a summer entertainment programme called Les enchantées.

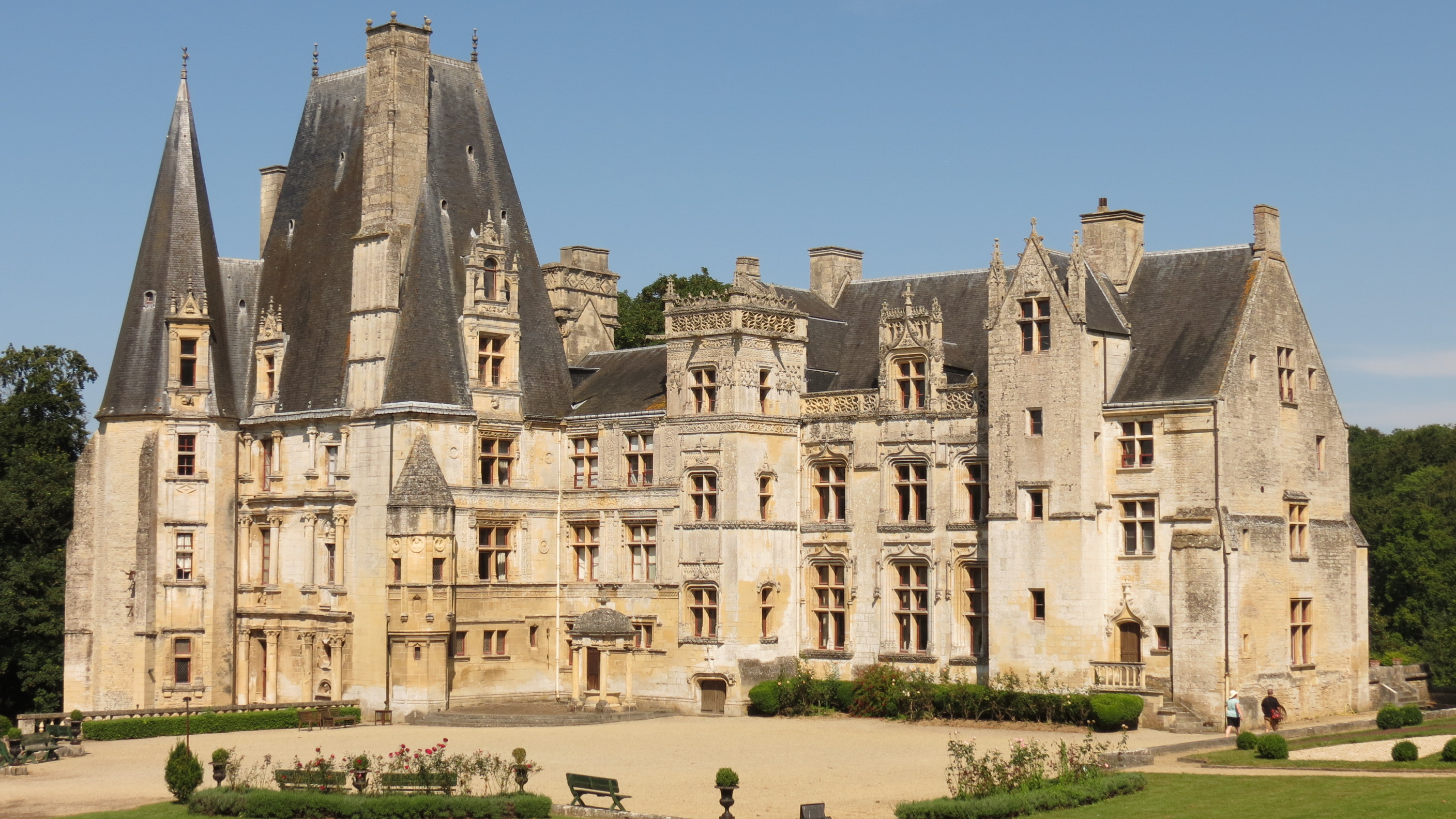
The main façade of the main building of the castle (1500-1537).

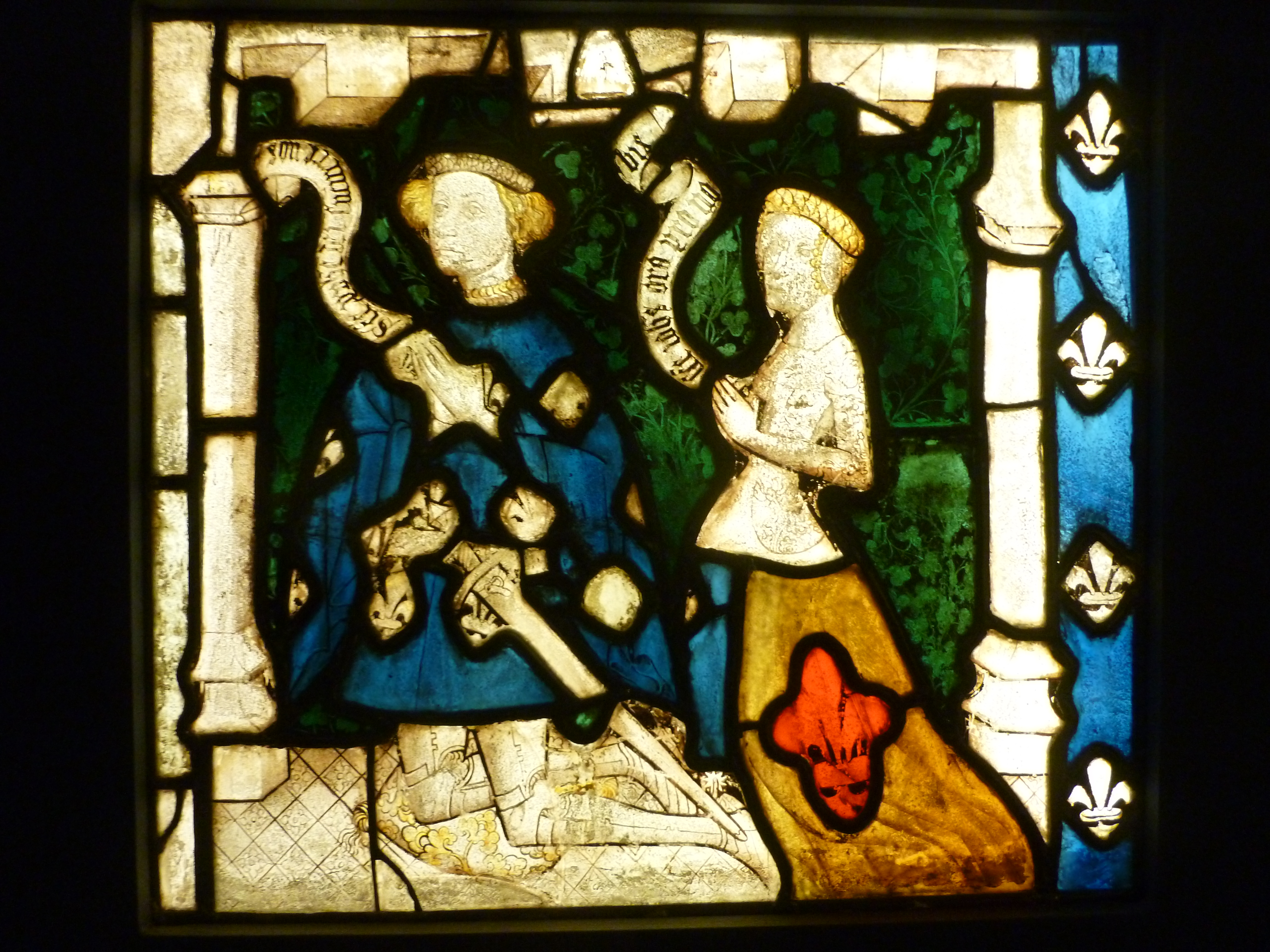
Jeanne de Tilly and Jean de Saint-Gilles, her husband, depicted in a stained glass window by Gauthier de Campes, originally from the church of Betton in Ille-et-Vilaine (Cluny Museum, early 16th century).

== Architecture ==
By examining the masonry in detail and comparing the estimates and plans from the 18th and 19th centuries, Bertrand Jestaz attempted to reconstruct the various stages in the construction of this complex assemblage of residential buildings. His conclusions were later adopted by Jean-Pierre Babelon.

From the austere Gothic style of the chapel and the Old Manor to the Louis XII and Renaissance decoration of the Gros Pavillon, it is evident that the d'Harcourt family, who owned the estate from 1400 to 1575, consistently sought to keep the château in harmony with the artistic styles of their time.

Although it remained unfinished, the residence remains one of the most valuable examples of the evolution of Norman taste from the reign of Charles VIII to that of Henry II.

=== Medieval period (11th–13th centuries): the fortress ===
On the site of an earlier fortress dating from the early 11th century, two powerful Anglo-Norman families, the Tilly family and the d'Harcourt family, began constructing a château at the very beginning of the 13th century, following the same layout as the ducal castle of Caen. The complex originally consisted of three main buildings: the lordly apartments or seigneurial residence (camera in Latin), the Great Hall or reception hall (referred to in certain Latin texts predating the 12th century as the aula, though Old French texts describe it as the grant salle), and the chapel (capella in Latin).

To the north-east of the present building, set into the slope descending toward the valley, stood a substantial fortified structure which may have served as a keep. The courtyard in front of this building was once enclosed by high crenellated walls flanked by powerful towers pierced with arrow slits and connected by a wall walk. Following an arrangement already observed at the ducal castle of Caen and which would become more widespread during the 14th century, these curtain walls rose almost to the tops of the towers, thereby allowing easier movement for defenders. Facing north, the entrance to the fortress was protected by a massive gatehouse framed by two tall polygonal towers, which were incorporated during the 16th century into the large quadrangular pavilion. In addition to a murder-hole system and a drawbridge, the complex was surrounded by a moat of which no traces remain today. The castle chapel, now somewhat isolated within the park, was probably originally enclosed within the fortified enceinte.

Despite its considerable scale, the fortress was probably destroyed during the Hundred Years' War..

Several elements from this period have survived, including 11th-century vault fragments, the largely Romanesque chapel built by Henry de Tilly (rib-vaulted during the 13th century and partly modified in the 16th century), and the rib-vaulted cellars dating from the 12th and 13th centuries, which originally formed the ground floor of the seigneurial residence. Through their sobriety and restrained ornamentation, these features are associated with the Classical Gothic style (1180–1230), then exemplified by the cathedrals of Chartres and Bourges, thereby reflecting the care devoted to the aesthetic quality of the building.

=== Late Middle Ages (14th–15th centuries): reconstruction ===
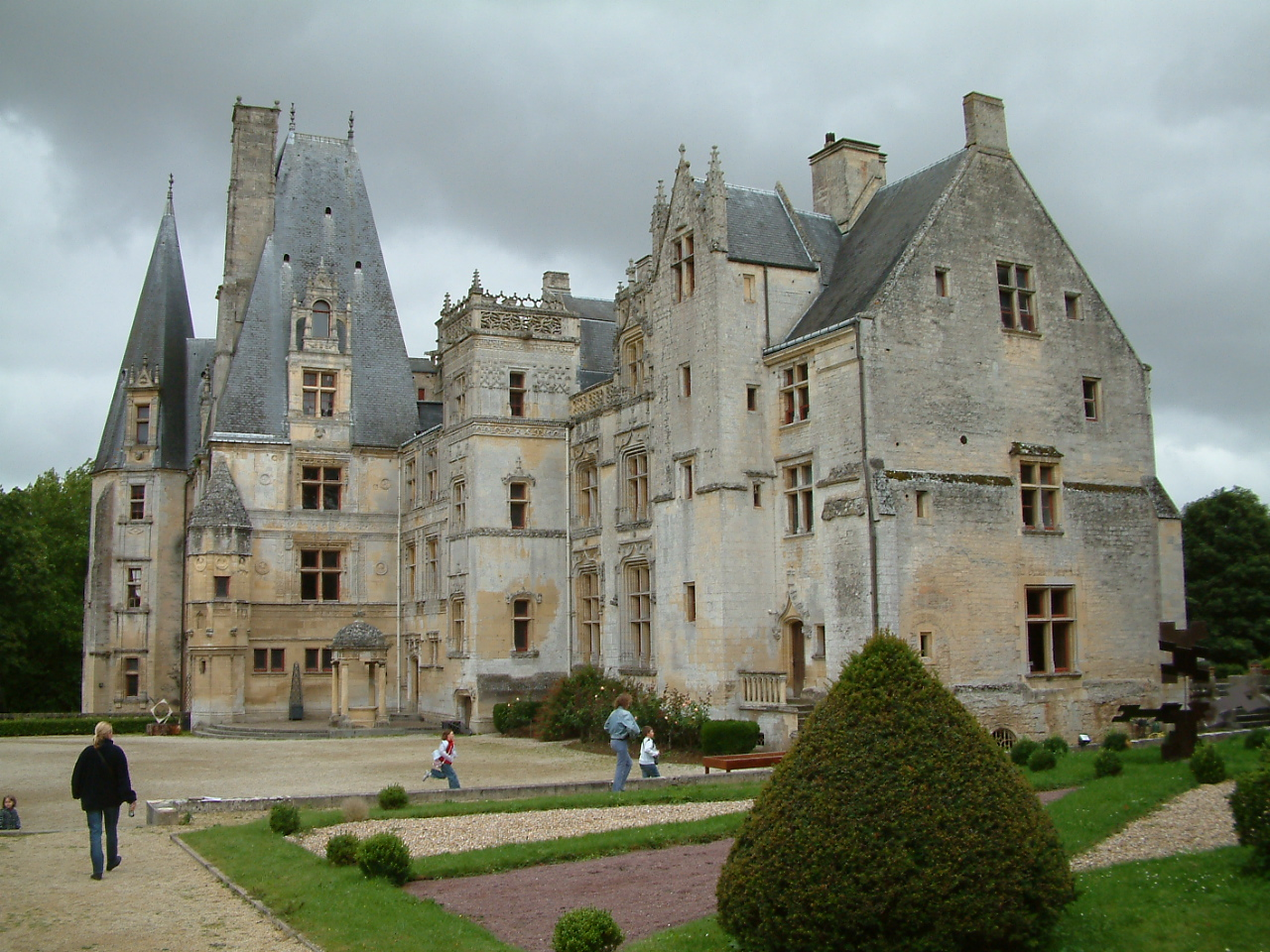
View of the maison du fermier built in a Flamboyant Gothic style marked by its sobriety.

When Jeanne de Tilly married Philippe d'Harcourt in 1374, she brought him several estates as a dowry, including that of Fontaine-Henry. It was during this period that a major reconstruction of the medieval castle—which had been partially destroyed during the Hundred Years' War—was undertaken. This work was continued by their descendants, gradually giving the building its present appearance.

Breaking with the original layout of the fortress, which had linked the gatehouse to the main building, the northern end of the structure was rebuilt starting in the late 14th century to serve as the steward's residence. Built in a very sober Flamboyant Gothic style in the mid-15th century, the stair turret and the last bay on the right of the central section date from this first phase of construction.

=== Louis XII style (1495–1515/1530): transition ===
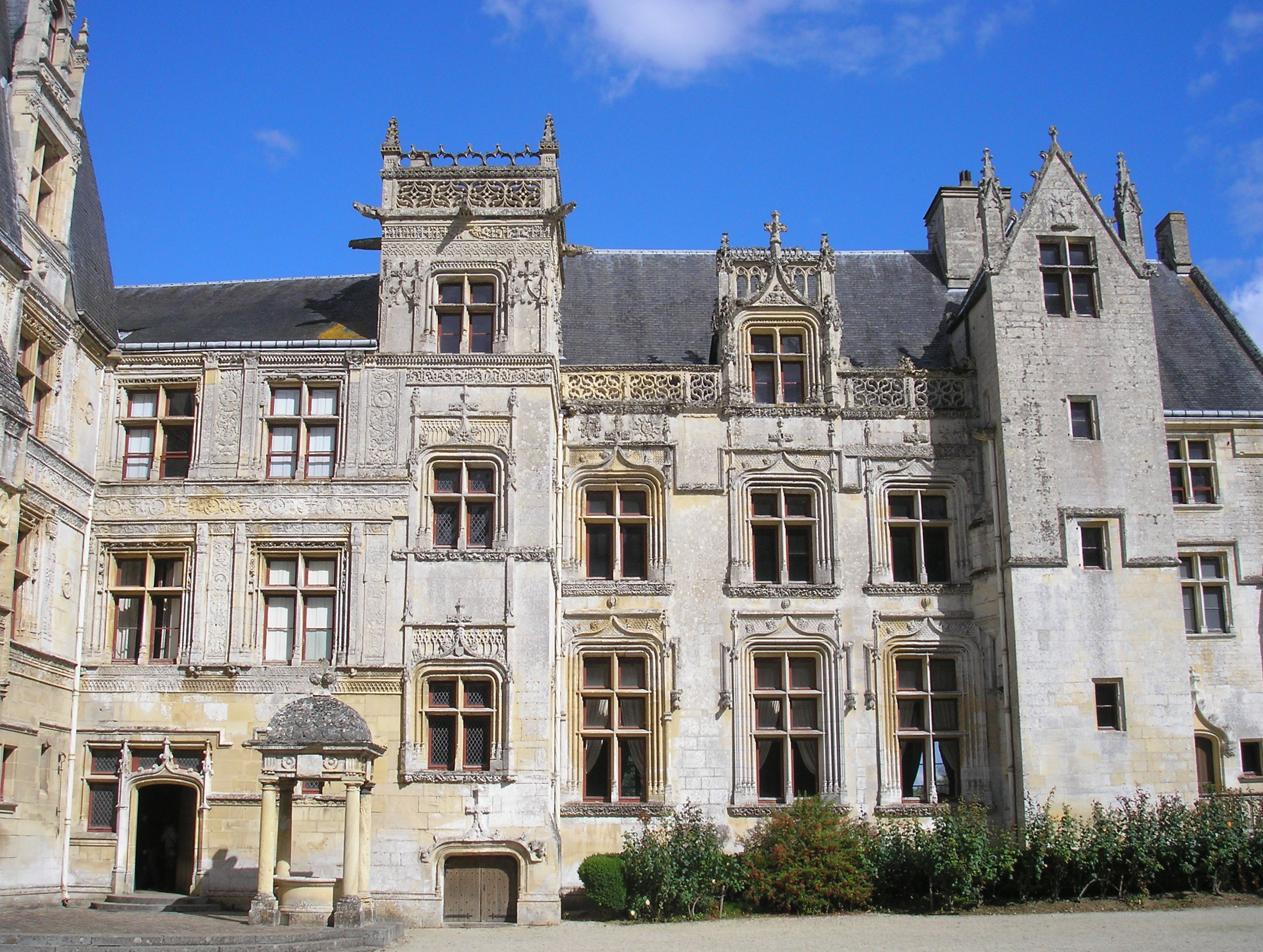
The central Logis seigneurial of Louis XII style.

In 1497, Jean d'Harcourt inherited the estate and, together with his son Pierre, Baron of Briouze, undertook the complete rebuilding of the manorial residence.

A sign of changing times, the façade of the new building was now conceived on a monumental scale. Following the decades of turmoil and the final phases of the Hundred Years' War, Fontaine-Henry reflected a renewed desire to impress and to assert restored noble power by drawing upon the architectural vocabulary of religious buildings. Although constructed only a few years after the farmer's residence and in direct continuity with it, the restrained Flamboyant Gothic style of the earlier structure had already begun to give way to a transitional style between Gothic architecture and the Early French Renaissance. This phase of construction, therefore, belongs to the height of the Louis XII style (1495–1515/1530).

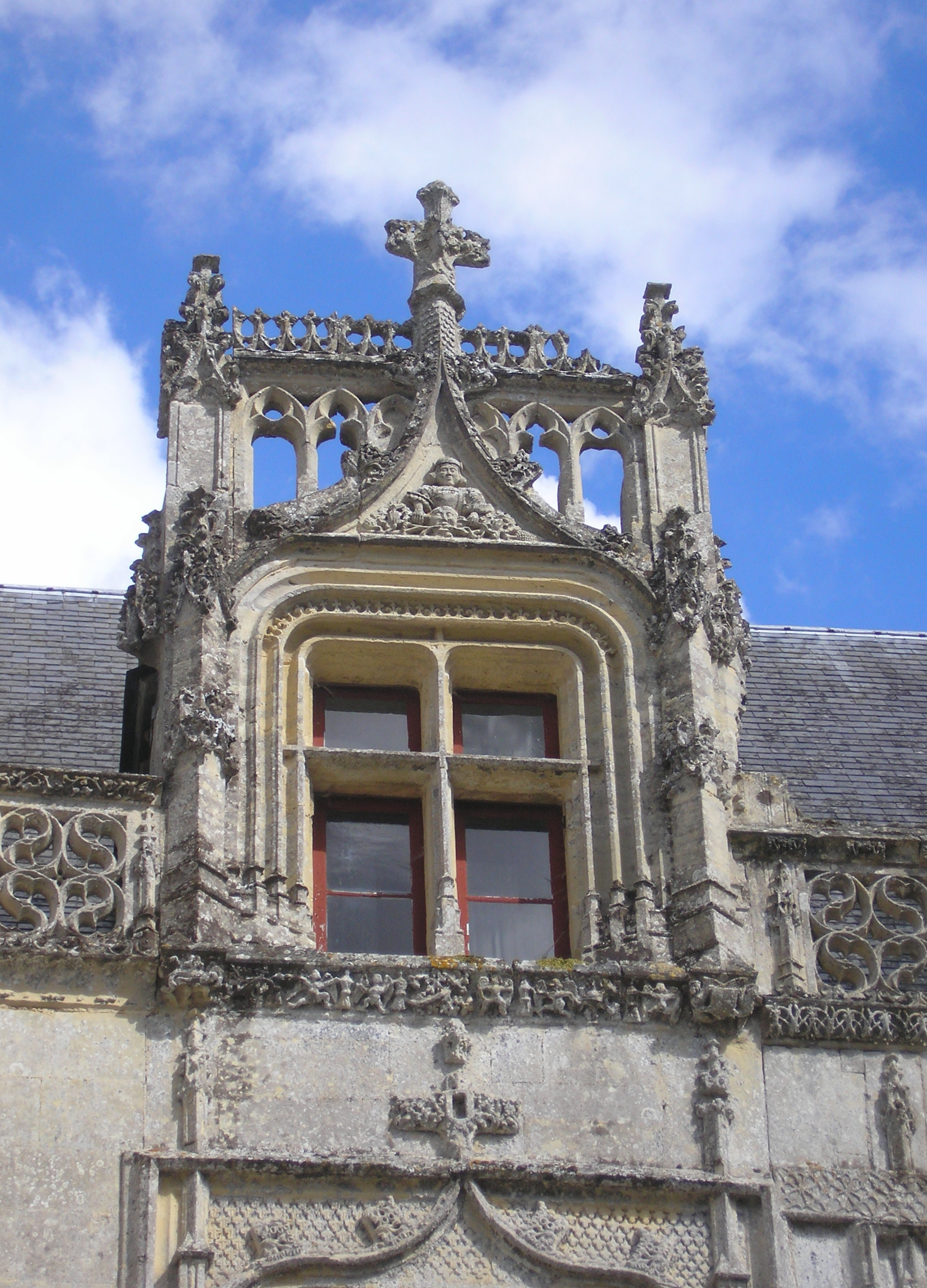
The dormer window of Louis XII style

In French architectural terminology, corps de logis (Note: The façade of the residential wing, like that of Argouges, demonstrates a clear architectural evolution from the mid-15th century to the early 16th century.) refers to the principal residential block of a château or manor house. also recalls certain contemporary arrangements observed at the Château de Blois and the Parlement of Rouen, particularly in the traditional appearance of its high roof structures and in the regular, symmetrical elevation of its three bays centred around a richly ornamented dormer window interrupting an openwork balustrade decorated with gargoyles. Influenced by Italian architecture, these more regular superimposed openings, linked together by mouldings, clearly foreshadow the grid-like treatment of exterior walls characteristic of the Early French Renaissance. Likewise, although the balustrade crowning the structure still appears fully rooted in the spirit of Flamboyant Gothic architecture, its orderly composition and stylised decorative motifs already anticipate developments of the French Renaissance.

Typical of the Louis XII style, the enlargement of the windows on this part of the building conveyed a sense of luxury, while their abundance contributed to the château's picturesque appearance. In addition to providing greater light, these wider openings also allowed improved ventilation of the rooms, reflecting new concerns for comfort and hygiene.

Following a broader architectural trend of the period, the pointed Gothic arch was everywhere replaced by the accolade arch or ogee arch, giving the ensemble similarities to the Hôtel de Ville of Compiègne, where comparable Flamboyant Gothic dormer windows surmounted by openwork arcading may also be found. It was precisely this French architectural tradition that appealed to Sebastiano Serlio upon his arrival in Paris in 1540: according to him, dormer windows "are great ornaments for buildings, like a crown", while the large roofs covered with bluish slate were "very pleasant and noble things".

Despite all these innovations, access to the upper floors of the new residential wing appears to have presented difficulties. The staircase of the farmer's house had likely become insufficient, and the d'Harcourt family seems to have hesitated for some time before deciding to construct a new stair tower, which appears almost grafted onto the building. Nevertheless, this feature is today considered one of the château's principal architectural interests. More than representing a clear stylistic break, its originality lies in the fact that the tower does not penetrate the interior of the residence and in its highly unusual square plan, probably influenced by the desire to create symmetry with the tower of the farmer's house, though ultimately impractical for accommodating a circular spiral staircase. While this constitutes a new variation on the projecting stair tower inspired by the Château de Meillant and, even more so, by the Louis XII wing of the Château de Blois, the structure nonetheless represents a simplified interpretation of the stair tower at the Château de Saint-Ouen de Chemazé.

The tower shares not only the same quadrangular plan and the same exuberant decoration composed of horizontal string courses combining flattened Gothic motifs with certain classical-inspired elements, but also the same terrace-like crowning feature surrounded by a heavy semi-military balustrade, here pierced with motifs formed by soufflets and mouchettes.

All these features give the ensemble an unexpected resemblance to the Manueline architecture of Portugal.

=== The Early Renaissance (1515 to 1530/1540): A Time of Achievements ===
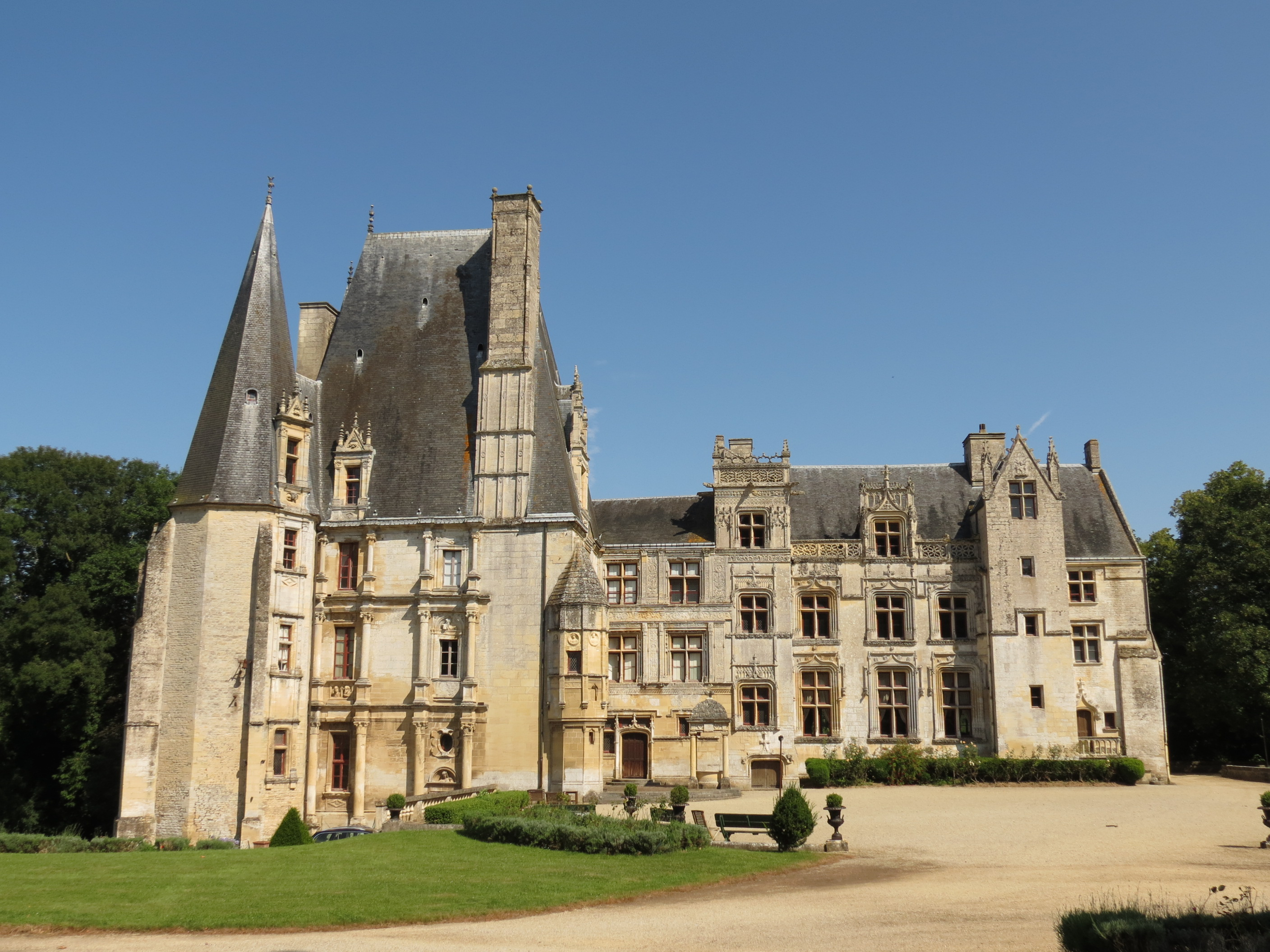
On the left side of the image, while the former medieval gatehouse has been incorporated into the gros Pavillon, its polygonal corner towers were preserved after being reclad with a series of superimposed bays in Renaissance style.

Following a brief interruption to the construction works, a resumption of building activity can be observed, once again attributed to Jean d'Harcourt. However, while this new phase altered the original project, it ultimately rendered the overall construction difficult to interpret. D'Harcourt's intentions had in fact evolved: through the construction of a new wing, he now sought to connect the former entrance gatehouse and incorporate it into the new residential block.

The task nevertheless proved more difficult than anticipated. As the ramparts and the adjoining keep gradually disappeared, the former fortified gateway became isolated from the rest of the modern structure and no longer aligned with the new residential wing. In order to achieve the connection, the future construction had to incorporate two successive offsets.

It was within this new architectural approach that, upon resuming construction, the decision was made to extend southward the most projecting façade of the stair turret belonging to the Louis XII residential wing, joining it so closely to the new wing that the masonry at the corner of the turret was reworked as tightly as possible in order to avoid any interruption in the continuity of the friezes and arabesque panels. The proliferation of these decorative motifs, which came to define the new architectural extension, illustrates the gradual disappearance of the Louis XII style in favour of the Early French Renaissance (1515–1530/40).

Indeed, with the beginning of the reign of Francis I, Italian decorative vocabulary became increasingly prominent. The façade was henceforth covered with a grid of cornices and pilasters with classical-inspired capitals, lavishly overgrown with scrollwork and other arabesques extending even into the window spandrels. Nevertheless, the final refinements of Gothic architecture yielded only reluctantly to the Renaissance style, and numerous hesitations can still be observed in the adoption of the new stylistic vocabulary. Thus, the embrasures of the openings continued to be decorated with naturalistic foliage friezes inherited from the Louis XII period.

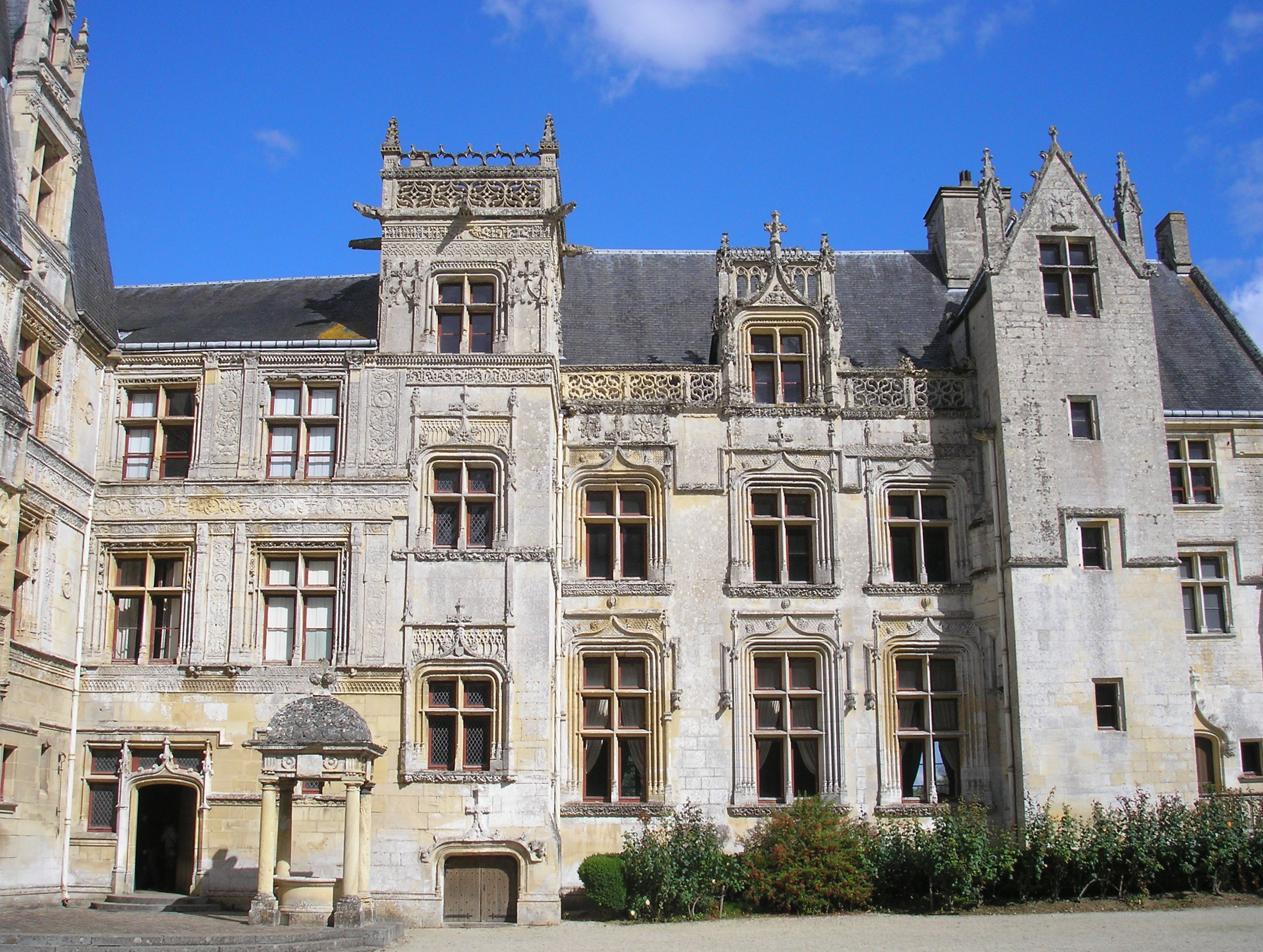
Transition from Louis XII style to the Early Renaissance (1515-1530/40): on the left, the south façade of the staircase of the Louis XII wing was taken up and joined to the new wing in order to limit any break in the development of the friezes and panels of arabesques.

As work continued with the construction of a second bay, the orientation of the building changed radically. In order to align the connecting wing as closely as possible with the former gatehouse, a new façade was designed extending at a right angle to the previous one, thereby creating a second offset.

This final elevation, constructed opposite and parallel to that of the former gatehouse, made it possible to connect with it and incorporate it into a new structure that would form the great corner pavilion.

It is through observation of this north-facing façade (excluding the dormer), flanked by its échauguette topped with a pepper-pot turret roof and the adjoining blank return wall, that one can today fully appreciate the scale of the volume added to the former fortified gatehouse.

In contrast to the rest of the building, the continuation of the friezes of arabesques and the appearance on this new façade of motifs in the form of diamonds and isolated medallions demonstrate at Fontaine-Henry the full acceptance of the Early Renaissance, linked to the spread of the Touraine style beyond its natural boundaries. The dormer windows with triangular pediments ornamented with balusters may moreover be compared with those of the Château de la Possonnière, which was modified during the same period for the father of Ronsard. With the aim of synchronizing the execution of the construction campaign, embellishments were carried out on the former fortified medieval gatehouse in order to ensure stylistic unity with the rest of the buildings.

It was first the former north-eastern tower of the gatehouse, overlooking the valley, that was reworked. Precisely dated to 1537 by the inscription on its gable, a dormer window decorated with dolphins was then added to create a light well for the fine newly constructed spiral staircase.. These various restoration and decorative works were subsequently continued simultaneously on the north-western tower, and in order to give it a more unified appearance with the rest of the structure, its façade facing the cour d'honneur was pierced with a whole series of openings featuring refined geometric motifs.

It was with this final phase of construction that this long series of works came to an end. While significantly transforming the medieval-inspired corps de logis into a true "Loire Valley château," these projects also served as the vehicle for a stylistic transformation: although still very present at the beginning of the building campaign, the lively and fanciful motifs of the Early Renaissance ultimately evolved toward a refined classicism, marking at the Château de Fontaine-Henry the advent of the Second Renaissance.

=== Second French Renaissance (1540–1564): classicism ===
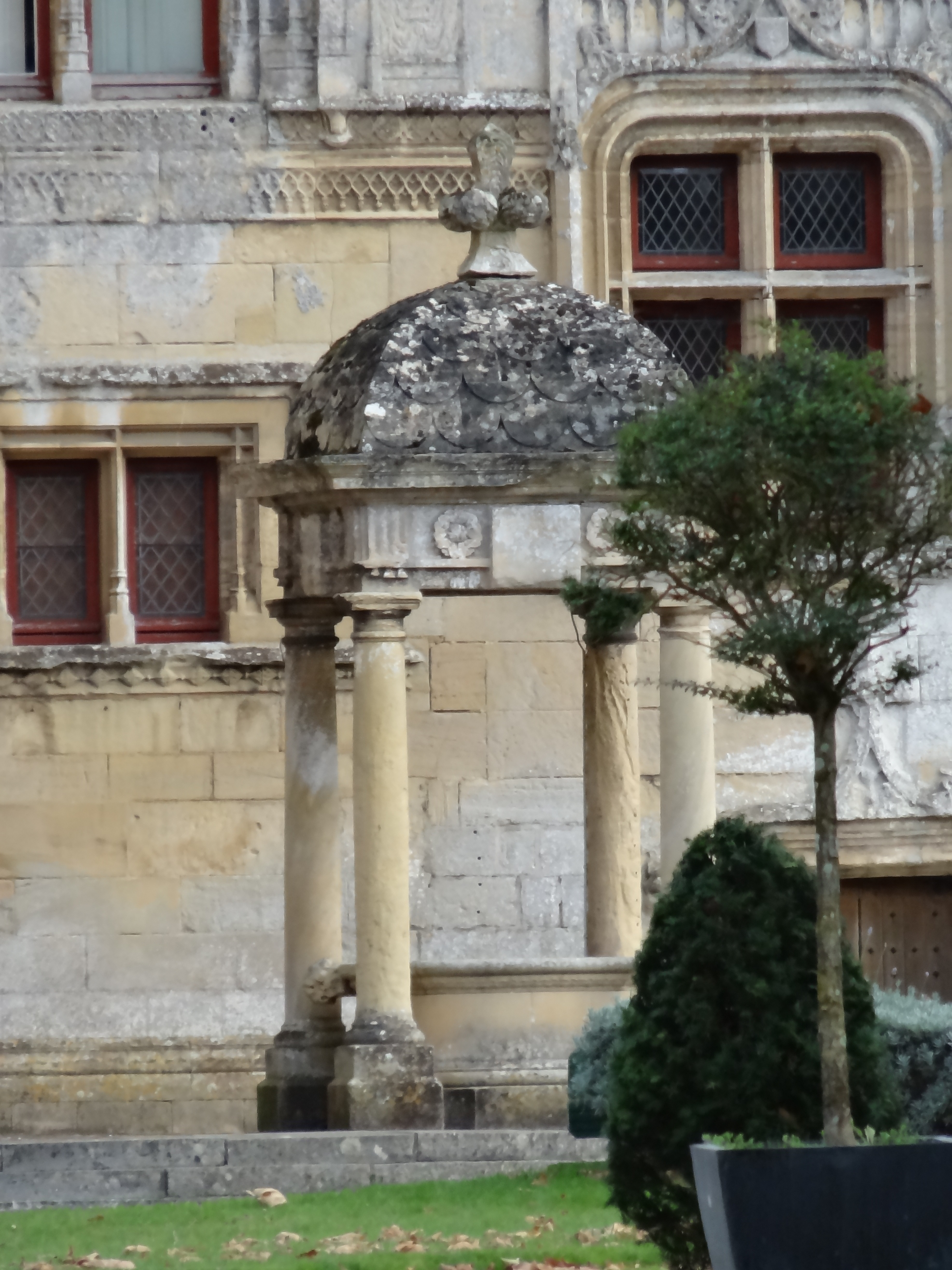
Well in the main courtyard of the castle, built by the Caen architect Blaise Le Prestre (mid-16th century century).

Although the completion of the series of embellishment works had been marked by the maturation of the style that emerged at the beginning of the 16th century, the true stylistic turning point of Fontaine-Henry began when Jean d'Harcourt undertook a final construction campaign on the western façade of the quadrangular pavilion. By this time, the artistic climate had changed. The artistic centre of Caen was now flourishing, deeply influenced by classical decoration and ambitious architectural concepts while the Loire Valley had suddenly become a conservatory of Early French Renaissance forms. Following the arrival of Sebastiano Serlio in Paris in 1540, this new generation of artists active in Caen developed an original synthesis between the lessons of Antiquity, the Italian Renaissance, and French national traditions.

Marked by this stylistic evolution, the architect responsible for the final construction campaign at Fontaine-Henry is known to have been Blaise Le Prestre.[3] Already active in the region, his presence at the estate is documented as early as 1544, when he constructed a large straight staircase within the château, marking the beginning of a new series of works. While reusing the characteristic arrangements of the courtyard façade of the Hôtel d'Escoville in Caen (1533–1540), of which he is believed to have been the architect, Le Prestre completed the previously unfinished western façade of the large pavilion by developing a regular superimposition of three storeys of columns with classical capitals, punctuated by antique-style entablatures. In this way, the composition effectively concealed and unified the extreme irregularity of the window openings. Comparable to Jean Bullant's work on the north wing of the Château d'Écouen (1532–1567), this true "lacework of stone" is considered one of the earliest examples of an antique-style portico juxtaposing the three classical orders — Doric, Ionic, and Corinthian — as advocated in the architectural treatises of Vitruvius.

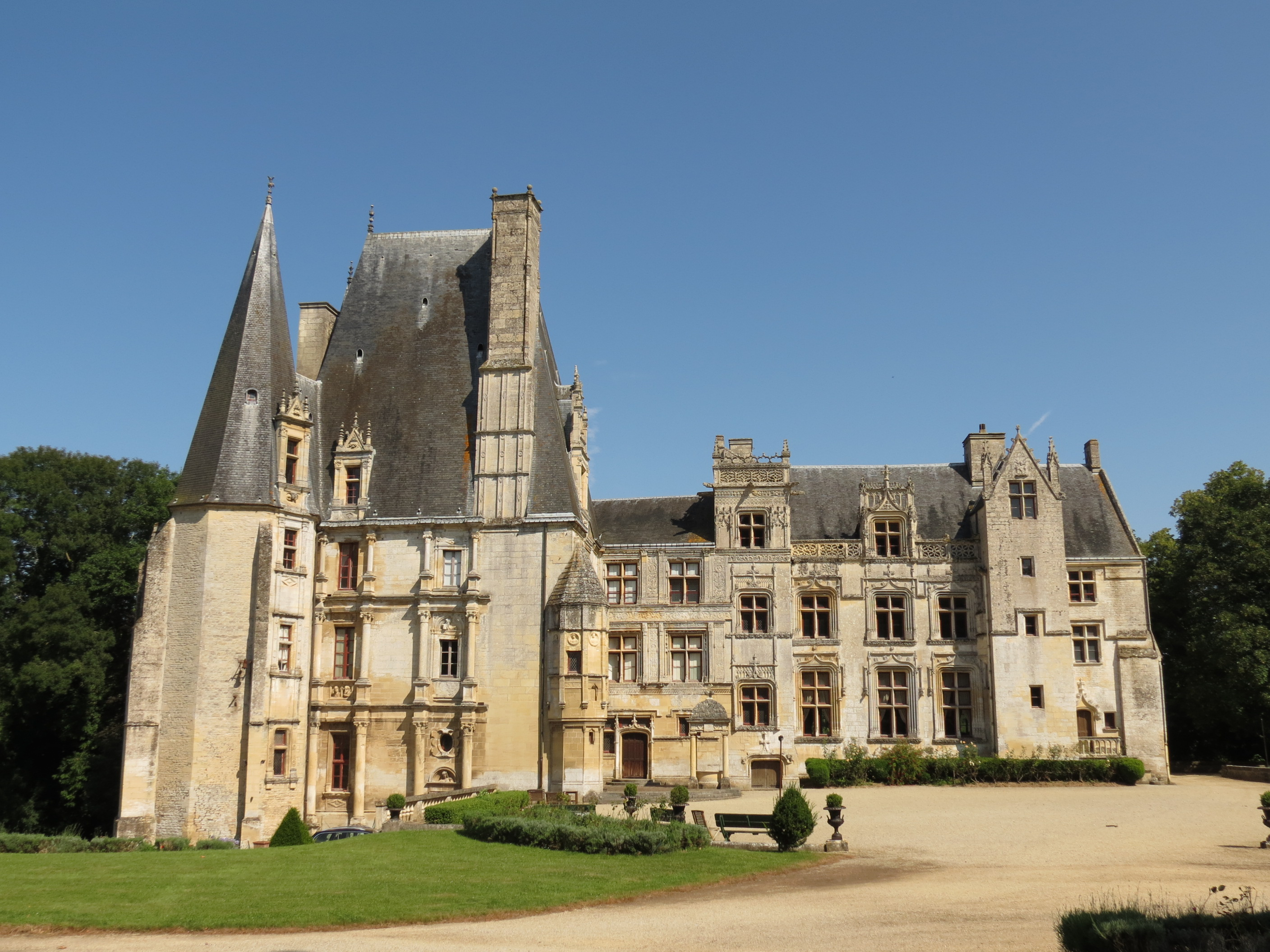
Following the example of the courtyard of the Hôtel d'Escoville in Caen, where he had worked, Le Prestre superimposed three levels of columns with capitals on the Great Pavilion (mid-century 16).

In order to complete the ensemble, Le Prestre probably conceived the immense roof structure, which in some way balanced the pointed roofs of the former medieval gatehouse. These exceptionally high roofs dominate the entire building through their sheer scale, while the colossal chimney stacks — scarcely less imposing than those of Chambord — demonstrate, in the apt words of Louis de La Saussaye, that in 16th-century châteaux such features had become true monuments in themselves. As if intended to impress visitors, the silhouette of these "highest roofs in France" contributes to the majestic effect of the whole composition, symbolically transforming this large corner pavilion into a kind of ceremonial keep, in continuity with the Château d'Argy and following the example of the entrance pavilion at Valençay.

Despite his involvement and the initial arrangement of the cour d'honneur through the creation of a columned well, it appears that Le Prestre's plans were never fully completed. Certain unfinished elements visible near the eastern chimney suggest that the connecting wing may also have been intended to receive a large roof structure, while the continuation of the Louis XII-style residential wing may have been planned for reconstruction in the new architectural style. Nevertheless, these final construction campaigns at Fontaine-Henry remain among the finest expressions of the art of the Second French Renaissance (1540–1559/1564), favouring the beauty of lines over the richness of ornamentation. As evidence, it is sufficient to compare the large square pavilion with a château of the Early French Renaissance in order to perceive the profound differences between the architecture of the two periods. All defensive features — machicolations and wall walks such as those at Azay-le-Rideau — have here disappeared entirely, while the rounded forms of the corner towers at Chambord were transformed, as at Ancy-le-Franc and Villandry, into a simple large quadrangular pavilion.

This evolution in taste at Fontaine-Henry is also evident in its ornamentation. One needs only compare the immense dormer window added by Le Prestre on the northern façade with the contemporary creations of the Loire Valley to appreciate the extent of this stylistic transformation. The superimposition of pinnacles, shell niches, and small flying buttresses characteristic of the Early French Renaissance gave way at Château de Fontaine-Henry to a composition of clean and restrained lines, sparingly decorated, in which simple classical fluting replaced the scrollwork and arabesques of the age of Francis I on the pilasters. A more sober and intellectual style had now succeeded the delicate elegance of the Early French Renaissance. Although references to the Italian Renaissance remained predominant, they were already beginning to give way to models drawn directly from the Roman world, foreshadowing the emergence of a distinctly "national" French style by the middle of the 17th century.

=== The Modern Period (early 17th century–1792): A Time of Calm ===
Until the 18th century, the road from Thaon passed directly through the château courtyard by way of a monumental southern gate known as Gloria Laus ("Glory and Praise"), named after the title of a processional hymn attributed to Theodulf of Orléans and still used today during the Palm Sunday procession in the Catholic Church. It was from this viewpoint that the façades of stone lacework and the "highest roofs in France" were designed to impress visitors.

During the reign of Louis XV, the eastern façade of the building was eventually remodelled, thereby replacing the last surviving medieval wall of the ancient seigneurial residence. This section, however, had never been as richly decorated as the façades facing the courtyard, since the eastern side had served primarily a defensive function, protected by the steep slope of the valley through which the small River Mue still flows today.

=== The Contemporary Period (since 1792): Renewal ===
Henry de Carbonnel, Marquis de Canisy, inherited the Fontaine-Henry estate. He constructed the building housing the gallery and dining room and laid out an English landscape park. The estate later passed to his adopted daughter, the Marquise de Cornulier, whose granddaughter married Count Pierre d'Oilliamson. At the beginning of the 20th century, the latter undertook a discreet restoration of the château.

The current owner, Marquis Pierre-Apollinaire d'Oilliamson, has widely opened the estate to tourism in order to promote the historical and artistic heritage of the property. With this objective in mind, the marquis invites visitors to rediscover 800 years of history through a summer programme of events entitled Les enchantées.

== The château chapel known as "Notre-Dame du Val Busnel" ==
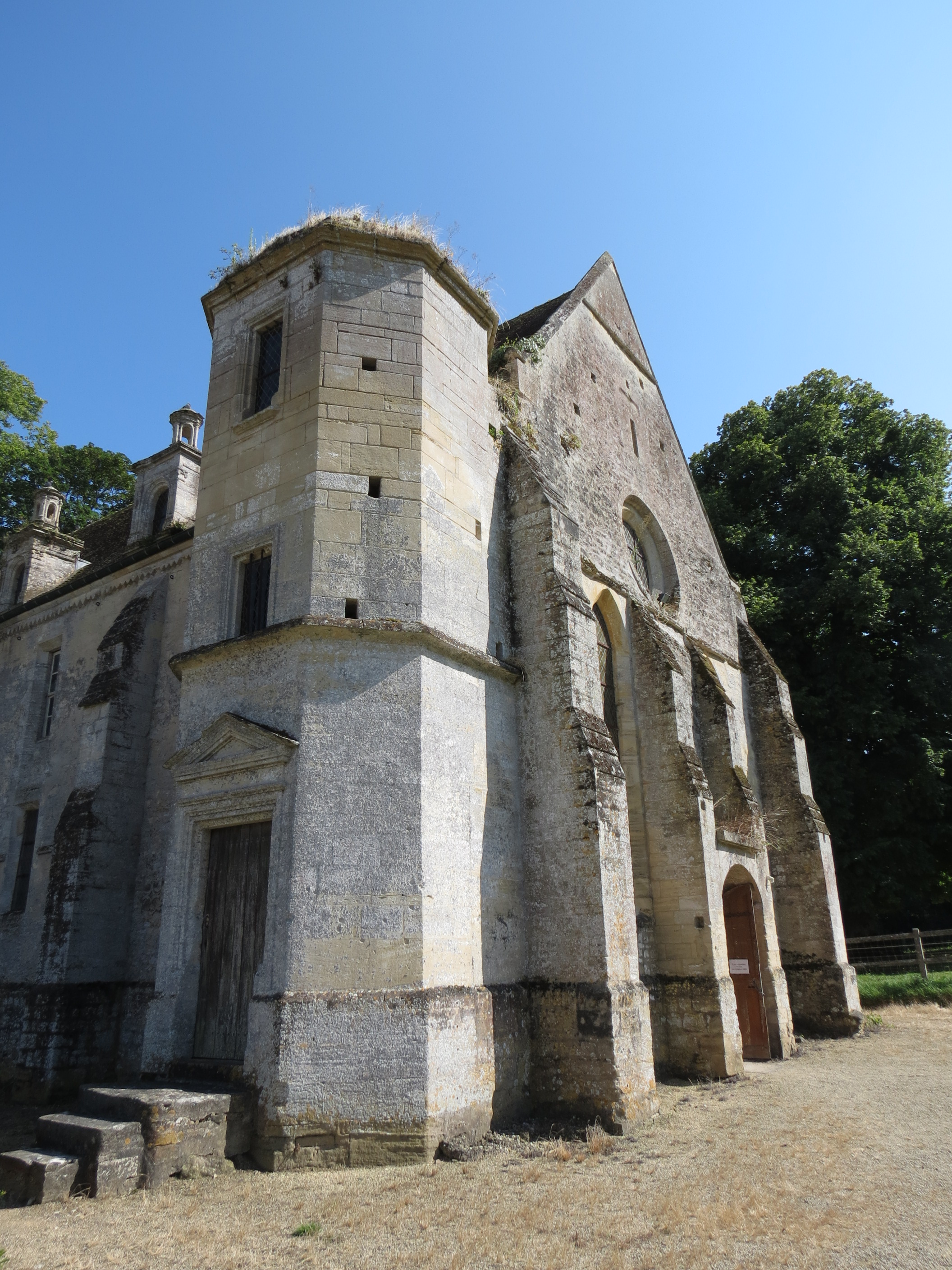
A classicizing triangular pediment applied to the medieval turret.

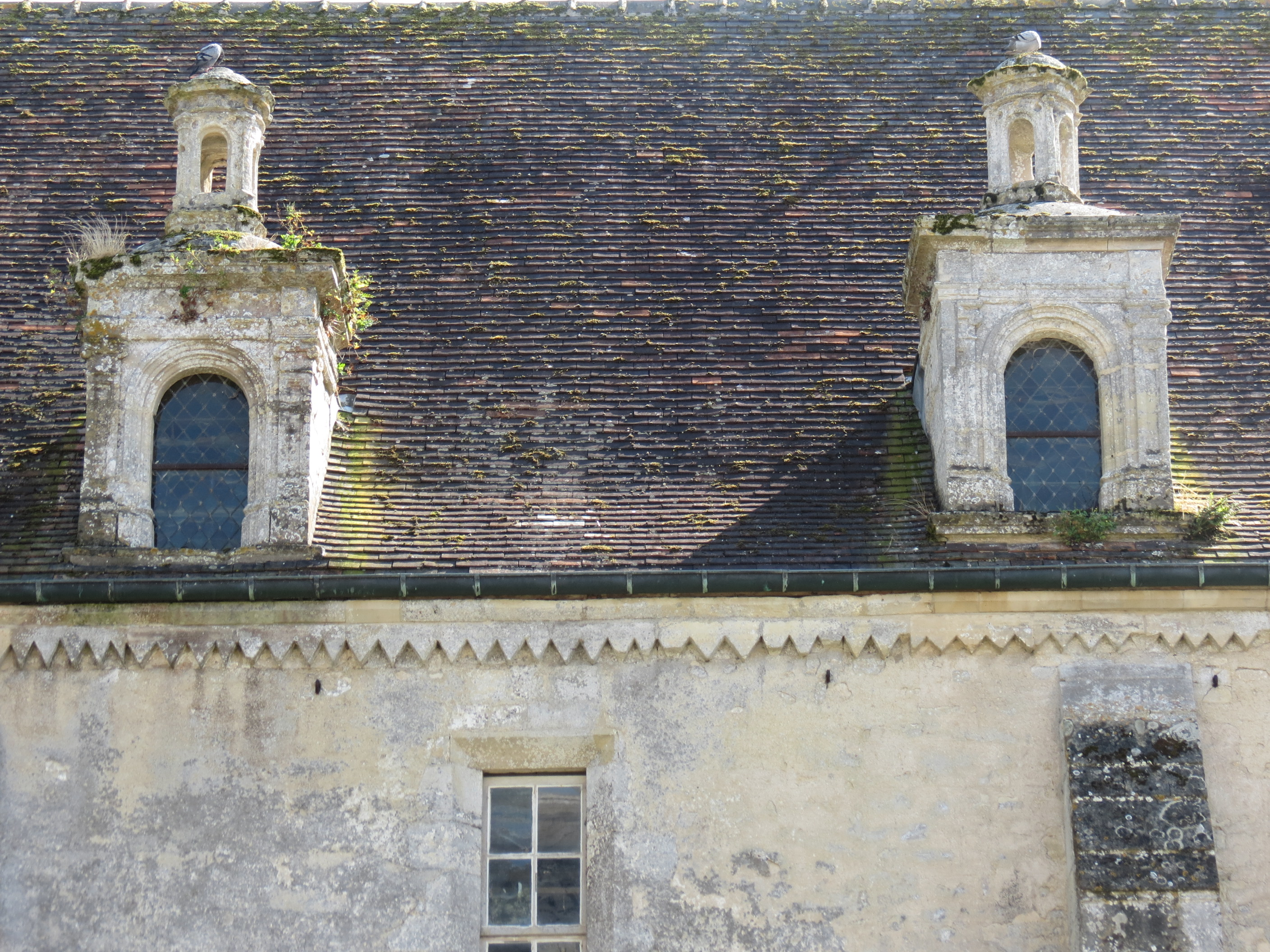
The refined classicism of the dormer windows, reflecting the style of Le Prestre, expresses the aesthetic evolution of the Second Renaissance (1540–1559/1564).

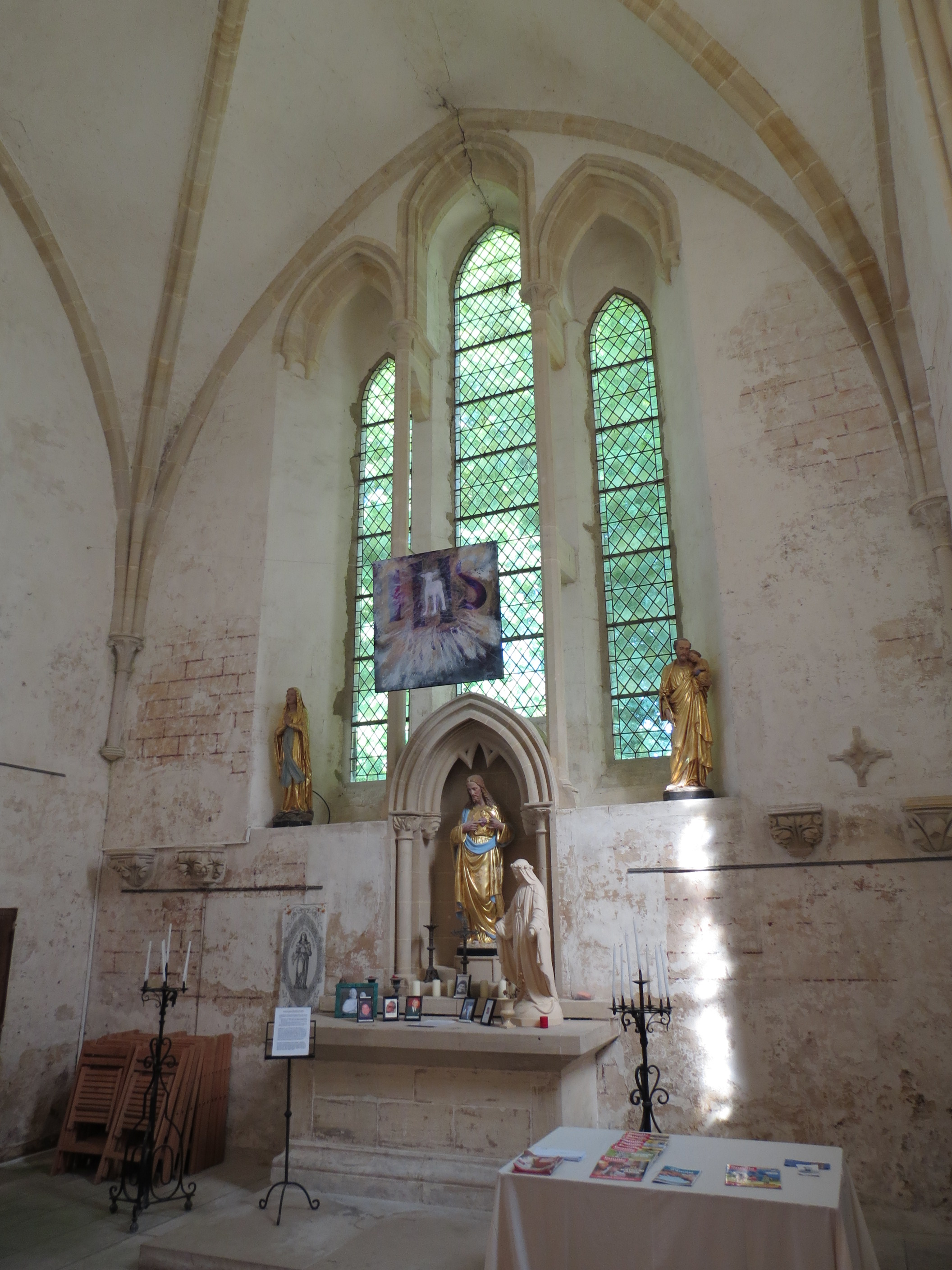
The three bays of the choir symbolize the Trinity (century 13).

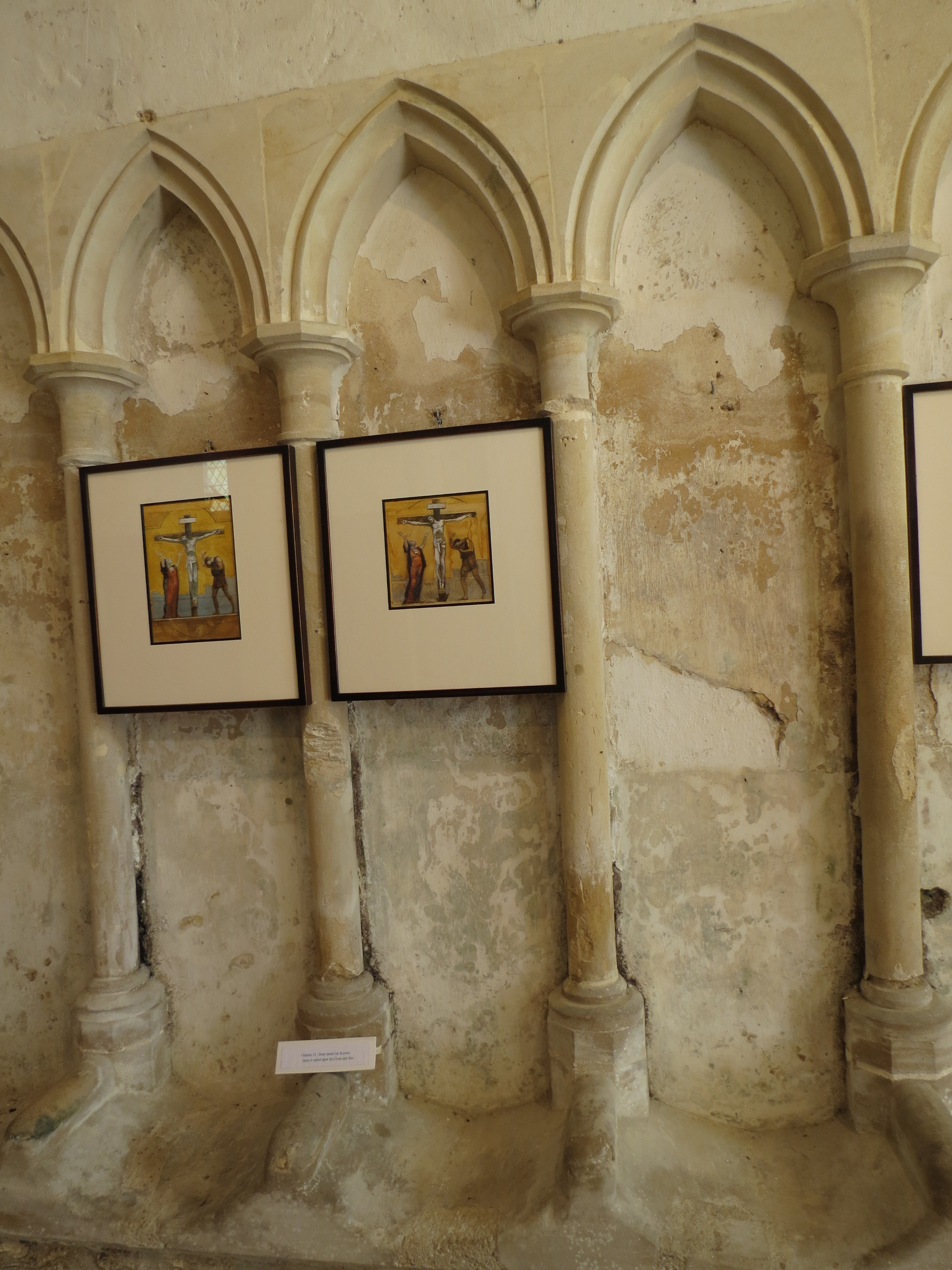
Stalls with ogive arches in the Classical Gothic style (century 13).

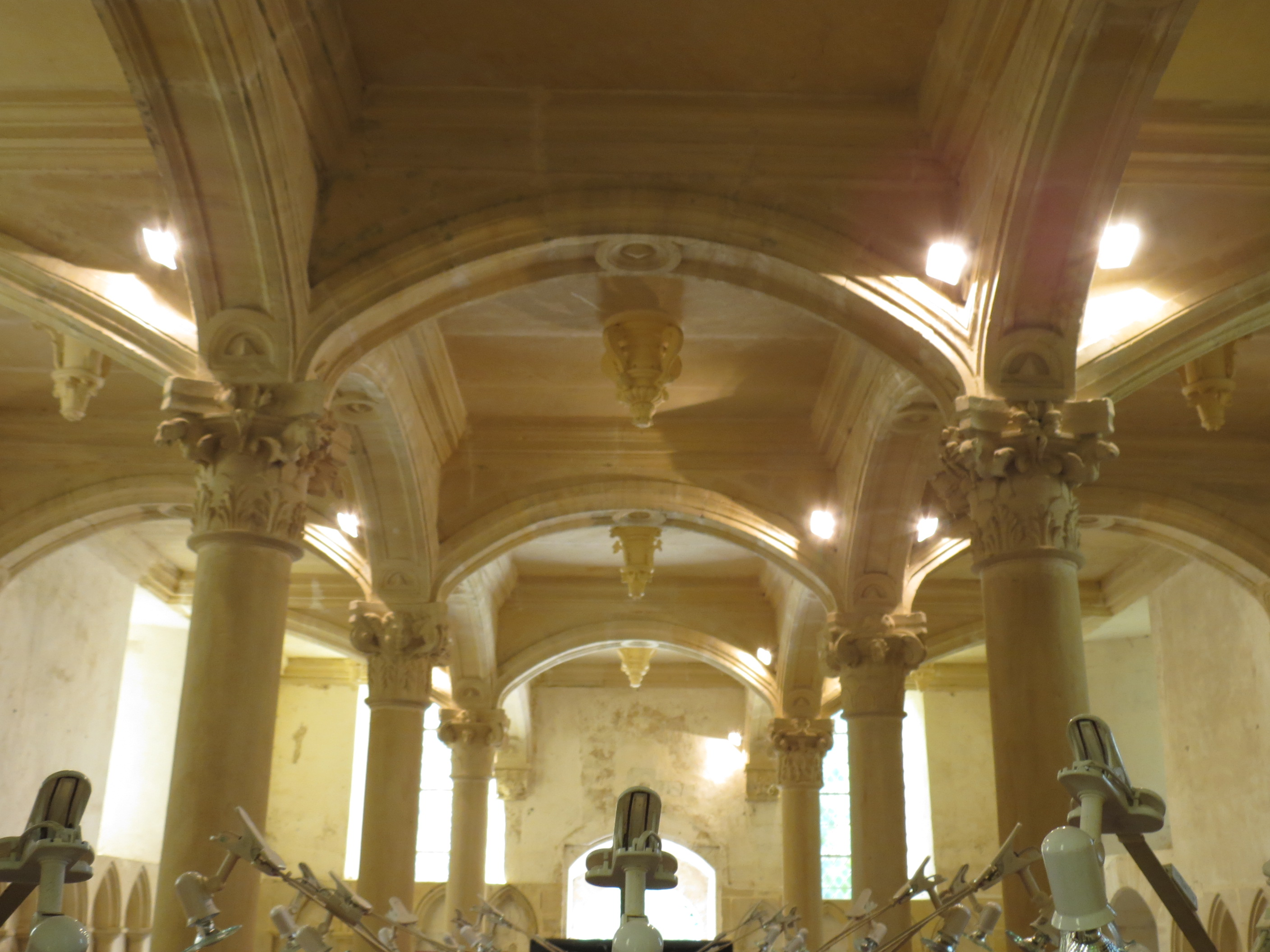
Abandonment of the rib vault in favor of coffered Renaissance ceilings (century 16).

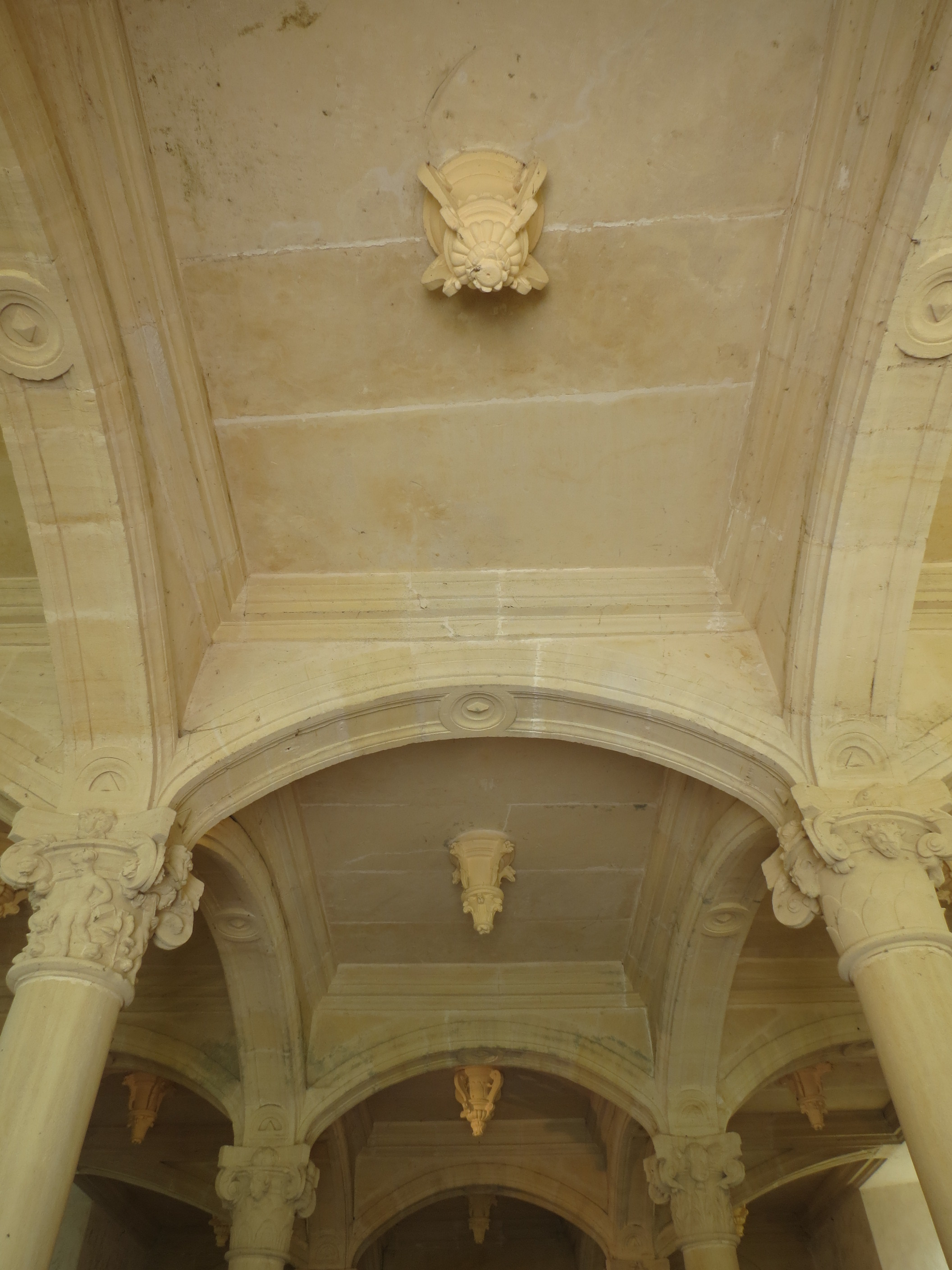
Details of one of the Renaissance coffers of the vault.

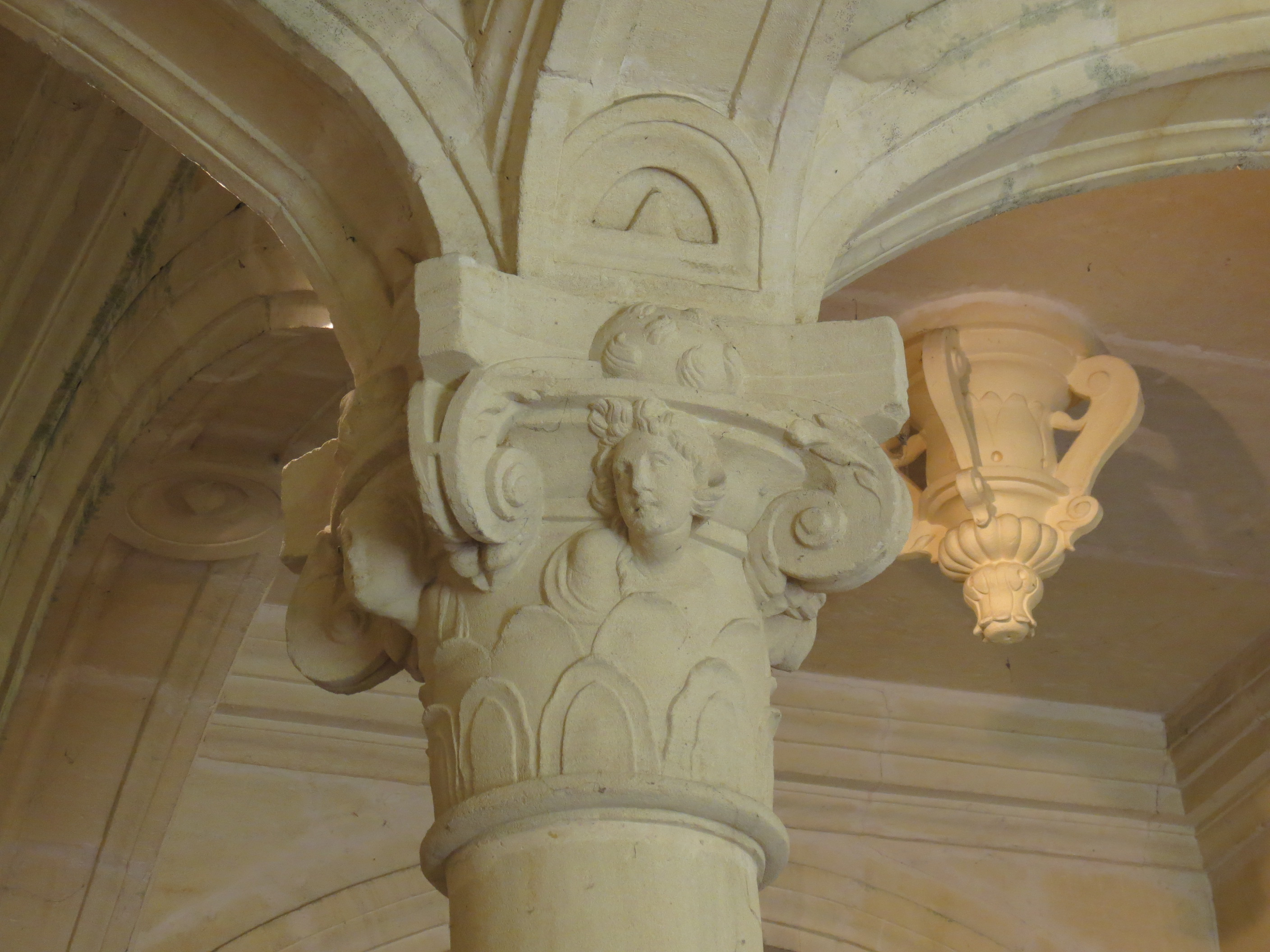
Abandoned at the end of the century 14, the return of capitals became evident again from the Louis XII style onward.

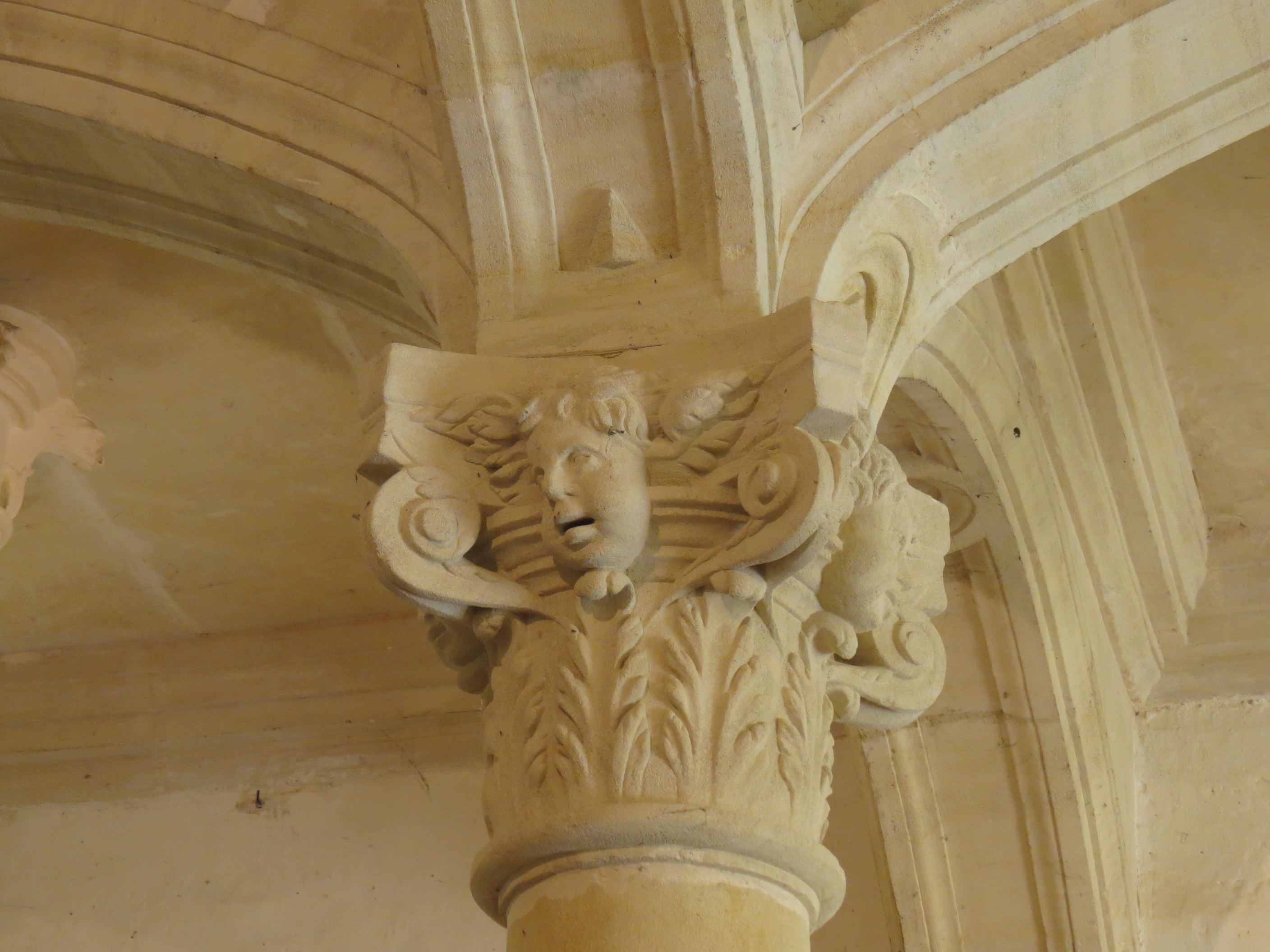
Fantasy capital, Corinthian only in its volutes (century 16).

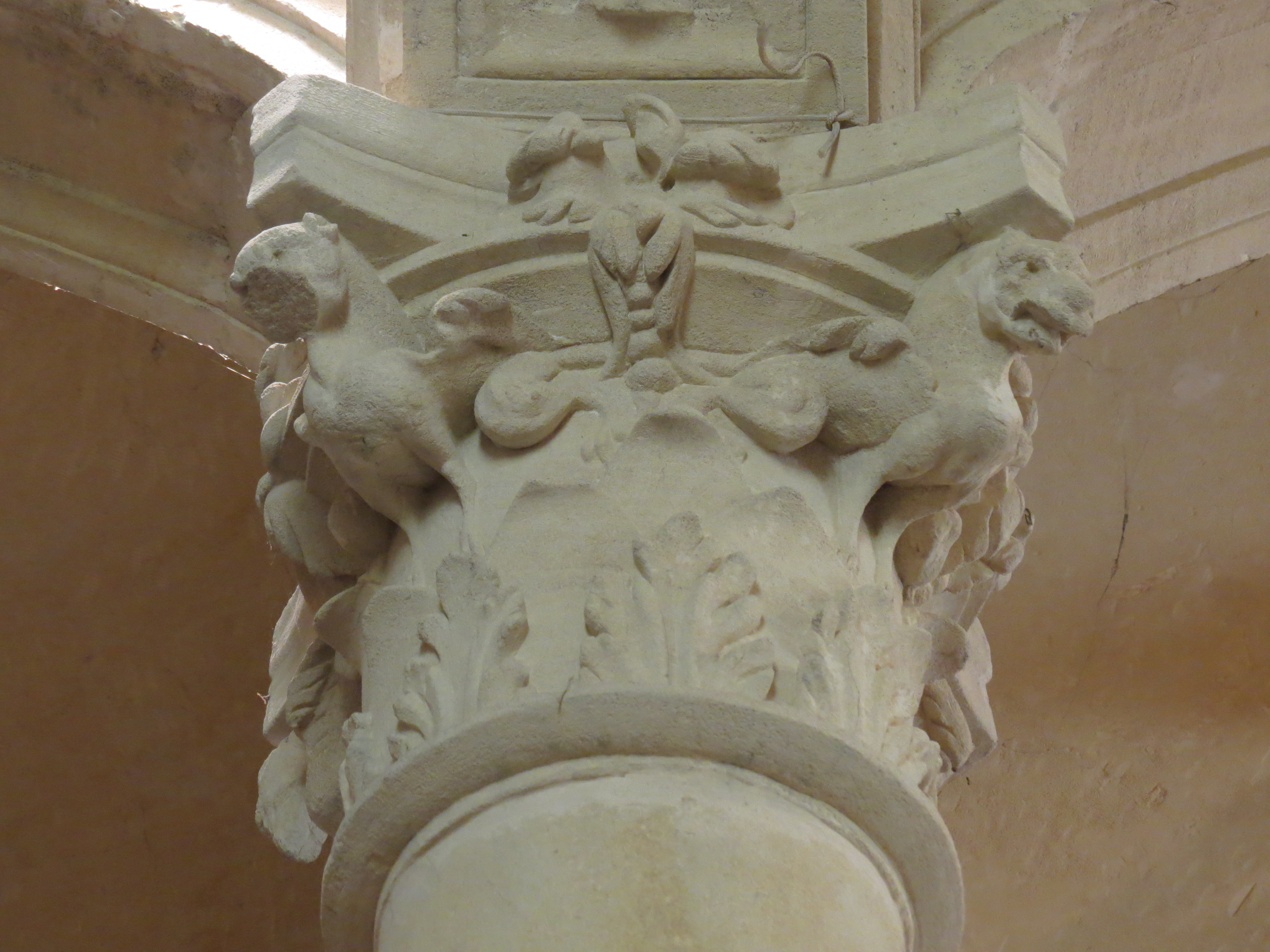
The creations are free in style and sometimes draw inspiration from certain examples of Romanesque art.

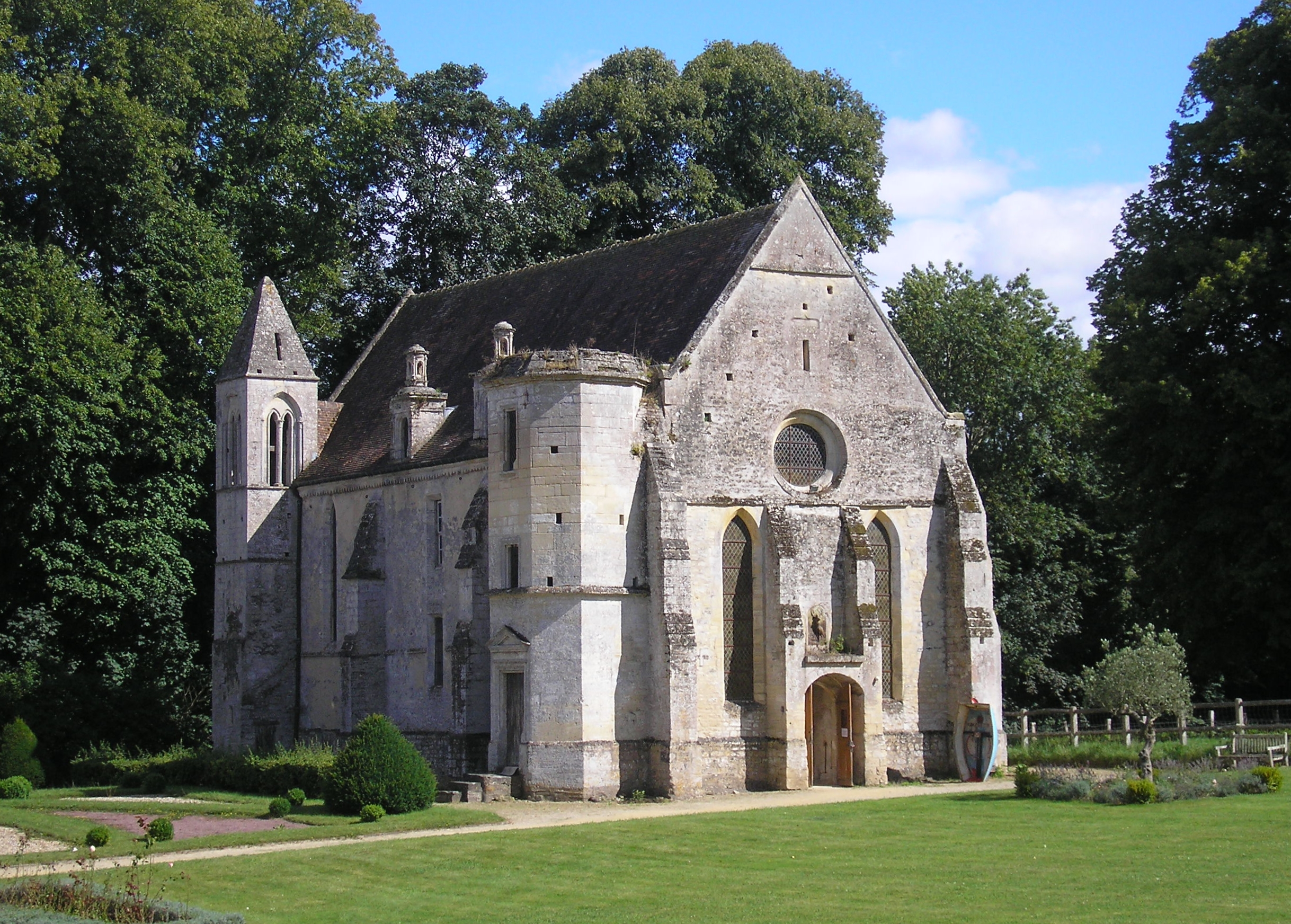
General view from the north wing of the château chapel, known as Notre-Dame du Val Busnel (1, partly transformed in the 1 by Blaise Le Prestre).

Although the chapel now stands somewhat isolated within the park, it originally formed an integral part of the medieval château. Probably situated within the courtyard in front of the château façade, it was protected by an enclosing wall surrounded by a moat, of which no trace remains today.

Originally Romanesque in style, the building was vaulted with rib vaults at the end of the century 13 during works carried out by the Tilly family. A small tower was then added against the north side of the apse before part of the nave was rebuilt at a later period. According to tradition, crosses were said to have been carved into the exterior walls of the building in memory of a journey to the Holy Land undertaken by Henry de Tilly, who took part in the Eighth Crusade. Today, however, it appears that these were merely consecration crosses: the chapel would seem to have been abandoned for a time and, after restoration, had to be consecrated anew.

The south wall has preserved its thirteenth-century style, displaying a series of lancet windows surmounted by a cornice decorated with sawtooth motifs. In keeping with the Benedictine tradition, the three elegant pointed openings pierced into the apse symbolize the Trinity.

Inside the nave, the walls are adorned as far as the choir of the church with pointed arcades supported by small columns.Within each intercolumniation, a stone seat was built to form a kind of stall, executed in a rather rare artistic expression. On the altar of the sanctuary, small columns support a niche that formerly housed a cross or a tabernacle.

During the century 16, as part of an ambitious project to transform the sanctuary into two superimposed chapels, following a royal model already seen at the Château de Biron in Dordogne, the architect Blaise Le Prestre divided the height of the former Romanesque nave with a flattened vault. Creating a surprising effect, the upper level, constructed with stone slabs, rests upon columns with Composite capitals supporting intersecting diaphragm arches. In order to create an apartment above this ceiling, a whole series of dormer windows with turrets was pierced into the roof, while external access was provided by the creation of an entrance crowned with a refined triangular pediment, inserted into the medieval stair tower.

The refined and classicizing style of the ensemble, already visible on the western façade of the great pavilion of the corps de logis, reflects the aesthetic developments of the Second Renaissance.

== Interior decoration ==
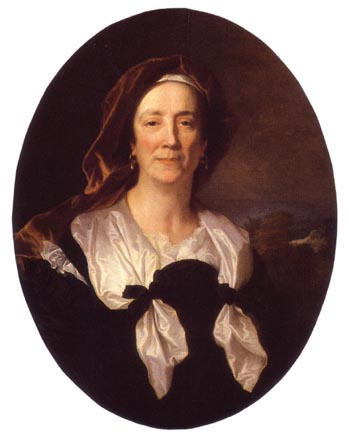
Maria Serre, Mother of the Artist, by Hyacinthe Rigaud (1695, private collection of the Château de Fontaine-Henry).

The interior of the château has been remodeled several times and today presents a suite of rooms decorated in a classical style, chiefly composed of wainscoting.

Nevertheless, some original decoration survives. In the staircase leading to the apartments of the 1537 pavilion, a high relief depicting Judith and Holofernes adorns the top of a doorway. While Judith, represented as a bust, holds the head of Holofernes in her left hand, she presses the hilt of her sword against her breast with her right hand. Below, a cartouche bears the inscription:

"HERE IS SEEN THE PORTRAIT

OF JUDITH THE VIRTUOUS,

WHO BY A NOBLE DEED

CUT OFF THE ARROGANT HEAD

OF HOLOFERNES, WHO HAD BROUGHT

BLESSED JERUSALEM TO RUIN"

The château, fully furnished and still inhabited, houses a remarkable collection of paintings assembled during the Revolution by the Cornulier family. Among this collection, works by Nicolas Mignard, Rubens, Correggio, and Titian adorn the walls of the reception rooms. There is also a remarkable collection of engravings by Van der Meulen, comparable to those of the Grand Trianon.

Since the beginning of the century 19, a portrait by Hyacinthe Rigaud of his mother, Maria Serre, has formed part of a collection whose other principal elements have largely been preserved.

In the Grand Salon, a sumptuous carved stone frame encloses a charming portrait of the child Louis XIV dressed as the god Mars, painted by Nicolas Mignard.

== Gardens ==
At the heart of a wooded park, three historic gardens were created to retrace the history of gardens from the Middle Ages to the century 18.

The château park has been a protected natural site since a decree issued on 24 August 1959.

=== The Notre-Dame medieval garden (inspired by the century 13) ===
Extending from the château chapel known as Notre-Dame-du-Val-Busnel, the design, layout, and selection of plantings in this garden correspond exactly to the practices of the early 1, when the Château de Fontaine-Henry was first constructed by the House of Tilly.

Created with the assistance of the Landscape School of the Priory of Saint-Gabriel, located in Saint-Gabriel-Brécy, this medieval garden establishes a visual link with the parish church of Notre-Dame-de-la-Nativité.

Everything within it is symbolic, and everything is designed to create a link between earth and Heaven, featuring culinary herbs, medicinal plants (known as "simples"), industrial plants (such as dye plants), vegetables, and ornamental plants, including a "Garden of the Virgin" in keeping with a tradition common to castles and monasteries.

=== Hortus Conclusus (inspired by the 14th–15th centuries) ===
The hortus conclusus ("enclosed garden" in Latin) was a small flower-filled enclosure developed within the cloisters of monasteries by monks around a statue of the Virgin Mary. The hortus conclusus was moreover frequently represented in medieval artistic productions, particularly in scenes of the Annunciation.

Recreating the aesthetic appearance of these compositions, this ensemble at the Château de Fontaine-Henry consists of an enclosure with a lockable gate symbolizing the inner self and intimate conscience. It is sown with grass and dotted with small flowers. A fountain reflects each person's soul, while a grassy bench invites meditation and rest. A tree recalls the Garden of Eden.

At the same time, this representation of a Renaissance garden—a century of change—demonstrates how certain fruits and vegetables were then discovered and became highly prized. Thus, beans and asparagus, then considered aphrodisiacs, began appearing on dining tables.,

=== The Sheaf of Parnassus (inspired by the 17th century) ===
Inspired by the themed groves based on Greco-Roman mythology that once adorned the estate of Marly (1684), the Sheaf of Parnassus served as the model for the design of the lawn that, at Fontaine-Henry, links the main courtyard, the château, and the chapel. The choice of this style was intended to establish a correspondence with the Classical-style façade which, on the eastern side, replaced at the beginning of the century 18 the last medieval wall of the former seigneurial residence.

== Protection ==
The château, including the terrace with its retaining wall, as well as the chapel and the well, in their entirety, have been listed as a Monument historique since a decree dated 22 November 2011.

This classification superseded that of 5 April 1924, which had applied only to the façades and roofs (excluding the modern single-story building to the right of the eastern façade and the wall above it).

The château park, extending across the communes of Fontaine-Henry, Bény-sur-Mer, and Basly, with an area of 72 hectares (180 acres), has been a protected site since a decree dated 24 August 1959.

== See also ==
- List of castles in France
- Gothic architecture
- French Renaissance architecture

== Bibliography ==
- Babelon, Jean-Pierre (1989). Châteaux de France au siècle de la Renaissance [Castles of France in the Renaissance Century] (in French). Paris: Flammarion/Picard. p. 840. ISBN 978-2-08-012062-5.
- Duché, Robert (1963). Caractéristiques des styles [Characteristics of Styles] (in French). Paris: Flammarion. p. 410.
- Faisant, Étienne (2010). Fontaine-Henry (in French). Caen: Monuments et sites de Normandie, Société des antiquaires de Normandie. p. 96. ISBN 978-2-919026-00-5.
- Palustre, Léon (2015) [1892]. L'architecture de la Renaissance [Renaissance Architecture] (in French). Paris: Libraires-Imprimerie réunies. ISBN 978-1-5087-0118-7.
- Viollet-le-Duc, Eugène (2012) [1854–1868]. Dictionnaire raisonné de l'architecture française du XIe au XVIe siècle [Analytical Dictionary of French Architecture from the 11th to the 16th Century] (in French). Vol. 1. Paris: Imprimerie de E. Martinet. p. 664. ISBN 978-3-8491-3597-3.
