= Betton =

Betton may refer to:

== Places ==
- Betton, Ille-et-Vilaine, France
- Betton, Shropshire, England
- Betton-Bettonet, Savoie, France
- Betton Strange, Shropshire, England

== People ==
- Betton, Count of Tonnerre, a sixth-century member of the royal house of the Kingdom of Burgundy
- Arnold Betton (1929–2009), American high jumper
- Silas Betton (1768–1822), American lawyer, sheriff and politician
