= Saint-Loup-de-Naud =

- Commune
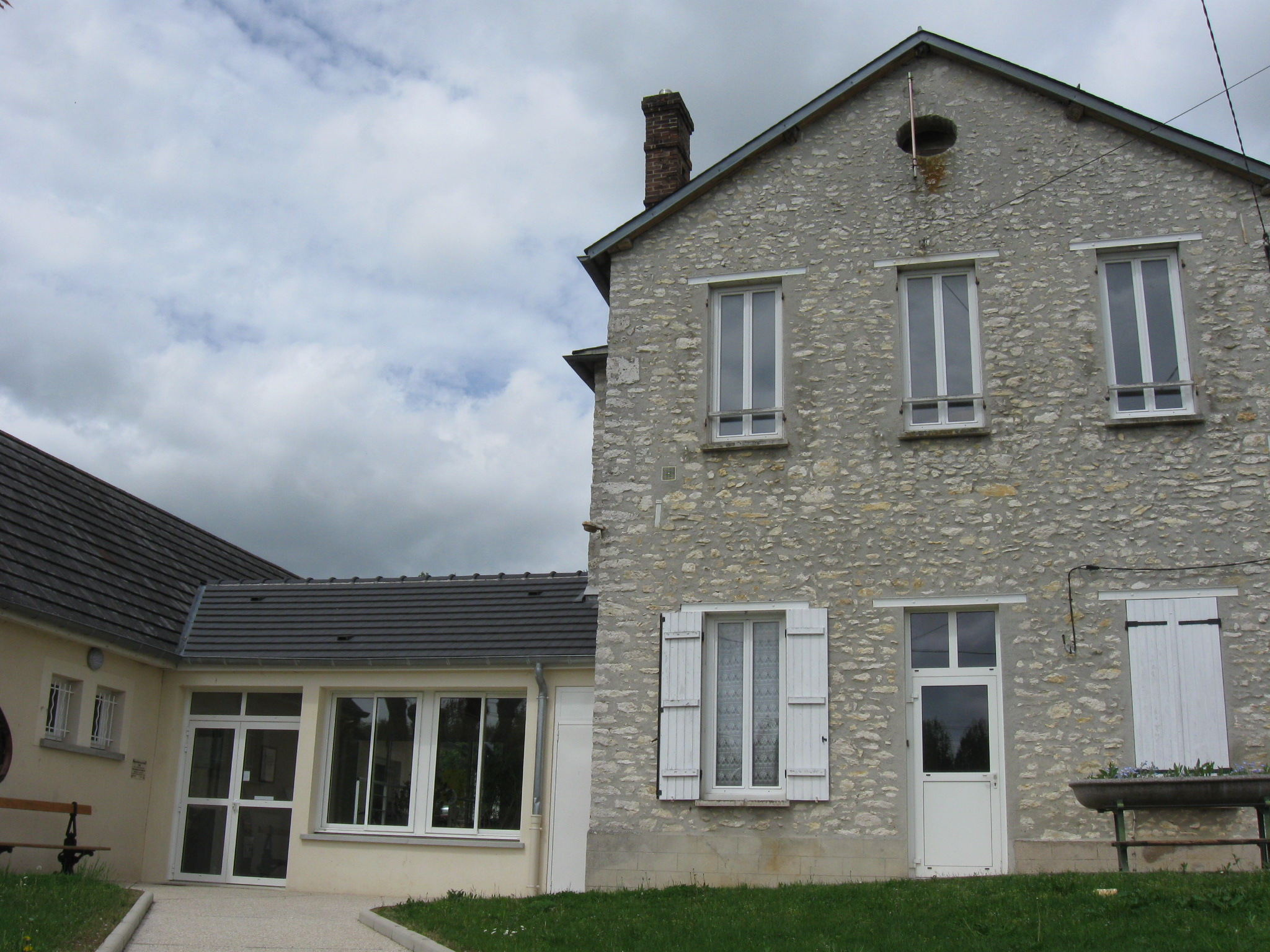
- The town hall in Saint-Loup-de-Naud
- Location of Saint-Loup-de-Naud
- Location within France Location within Île-de-France (region)
- Coordinates: 48°32′10″N 3°12′39″E
- Country: France
- Region: Île-de-France
- Department: Seine-et-Marne
- Arrondissement: Provins
- Canton: Provins
- Intercommunality: CC Provinois

Government
  - Mayor (2020–2026): Gilbert Dal Pan
- Area^{1}: 10.95 km^{2} (4.23 sq mi)
- Highest elevation: 151 m (495 ft)
- Lowest elevation: 71 m (233 ft)
- Population (2023): 848
  - Density: 77.4/km^{2} (201/sq mi)
- Time zone: UTC+01:00 (CET)
  - Summer (DST): UTC+02:00 (CEST)
- INSEE/Postal code: 77418 /77650
- ^{1} French Land Register data, which excludes lakes, ponds, glaciers > 1 km^{2} (0.386 sq mi or 247 acres) and river estuaries.

Saint-Loup-de-Naud (French pronunciation: [sɛ̃ lu də no]) is a commune in the Seine-et-Marne department in the Île-de-France region in north-central France.

== See also ==
- Communes of the Seine-et-Marne department
