= Betton, Count of Tonnerre =

Betton, count of Tonnerre (died c. 616), was a sixth-century member of the royal house of the Kingdom of Burgundy.

It is claimed that he is also called "Blessed Betto", as the father of bishop Lupus of Sens (c. 573-c. 623) in the article on Sens in the 1913 Catholic Encyclopedia.
