= Poigny =

- Commune
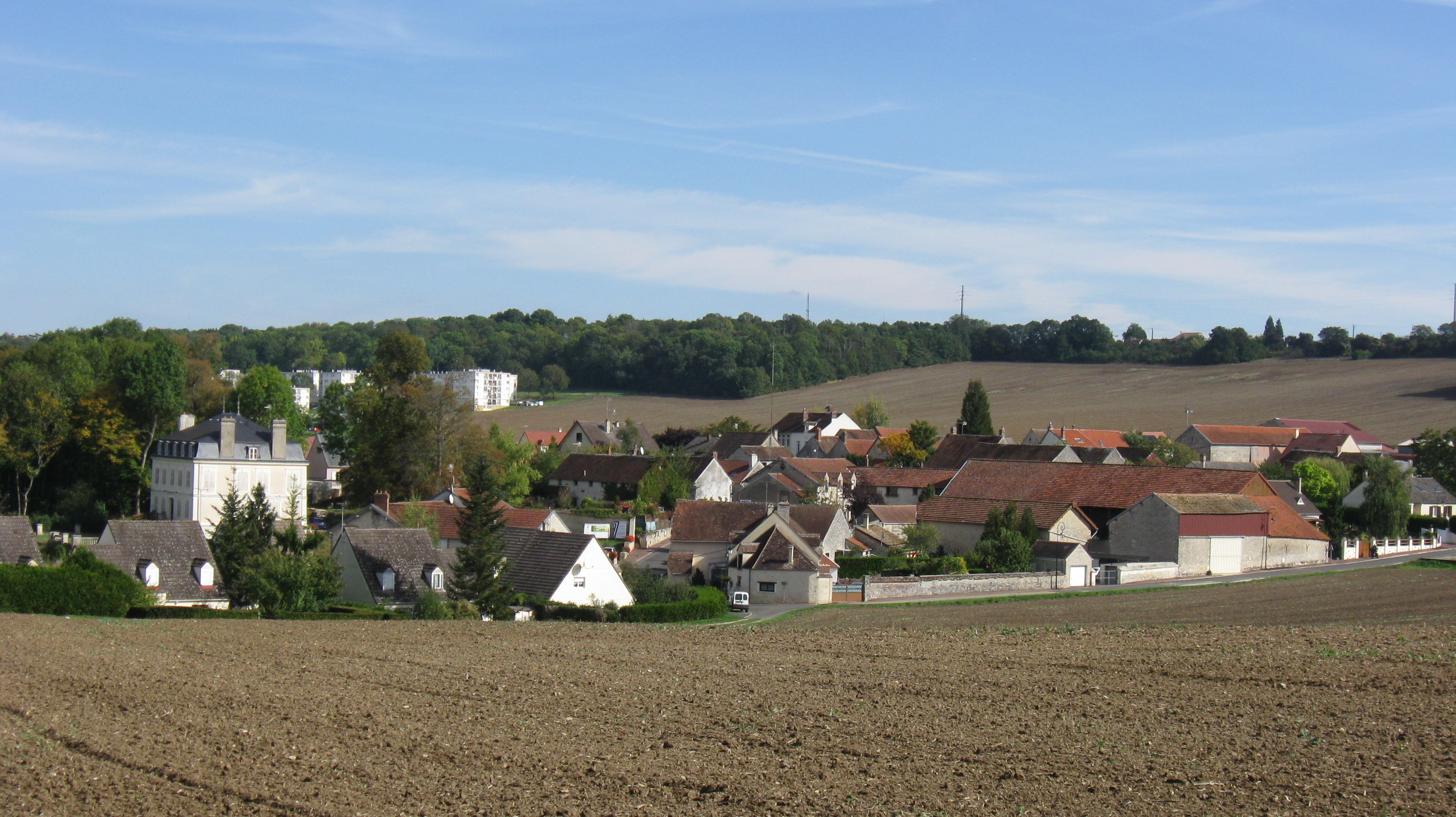
- A general view of Poigny

- Coat of arms
- Location of Poigny
- Location within France Location within Île-de-France (region)
- Coordinates: 48°32′20″N 3°17′00″E
- Country: France
- Region: Île-de-France
- Department: Seine-et-Marne
- Arrondissement: Provins
- Canton: Provins
- Intercommunality: CC Provinois

Government
  - Mayor (2020–2026): Claude Bonici
- Area^{1}: 6.02 km^{2} (2.32 sq mi)
- Highest elevation: 164 m (538 ft)
- Lowest elevation: 81 m (266 ft)
- Population (2023): 501
  - Density: 83.2/km^{2} (216/sq mi)
- Time zone: UTC+01:00 (CET)
  - Summer (DST): UTC+02:00 (CEST)
- INSEE/Postal code: 77368 /77160
- ^{1} French Land Register data, which excludes lakes, ponds, glaciers > 1 km^{2} (0.386 sq mi or 247 acres) and river estuaries.

Poigny (French pronunciation: [pwaɲi]) is a commune in the Seine-et-Marne department in the Île-de-France region in north-central France. Champbenoist–Poigny station has rail connections to Provins, Longueville and Paris.

== Demographics ==
Its inhabitants are called Pognissiens.

== See also ==
- Communes of the Seine-et-Marne department
