= Canton of Lizy-sur-Ourcq =

Coordinates: 49°02′16″N 3°01′14″E

Lizy-sur-Ourcq
- Former canton
- Interactive map of Lizy-sur-Ourcq
- Country: France
- Region: Île-de-France
- Department: Seine-et-Marne
- No. of communes: {{{nbcomm}}}
- Disbanded: 2015
- Area: 234.53 km^{2} (90.55 sq mi)
- Population (2012): 17,718
  - Density: 75.547/km^{2} (195.67/sq mi)

The canton of Lizy-sur-Ourcq is a French former administrative division, located in the arrondissement of Meaux, in the Seine-et-Marne département (Île-de-France région). It was disbanded following the French canton reorganisation which came into effect in March 2015. It consisted of 22 communes, which joined the canton of La Ferté-sous-Jouarre in 2015.

== Demographics ==
Historical population
Year	Pop.	±%
1999	15,606	—
2006	16,720	+7.1%
2012	17,718	+6.0%

== Composition ==
The canton of Lizy-sur-Ourcq was composed of 22 communes:

- Armentières-en-Brie
- Cocherel
- Congis-sur-Thérouanne
- Coulombs-en-Valois
- Crouy-sur-Ourcq
- Dhuisy
- Douy-la-Ramée
- Étrépilly
- Germigny-sous-Coulombs
- Isles-les-Meldeuses
- Jaignes
- Lizy-sur-Ourcq
- Marcilly
- Mary-sur-Marne
- May-en-Multien
- Ocquerre
- Le Plessis-Placy
- Puisieux
- Tancrou
- Trocy-en-Multien
- Vendrest
- Vincy-Manœuvre

== See also ==
- Cantons of the Seine-et-Marne department
- Communes of the Seine-et-Marne department
