= Puisieux =

Puisieux is the name of several communes in France:

- Puisieux, Pas-de-Calais, in the Pas-de-Calais département
- Puisieux, Seine-et-Marne, in the Seine-et-Marne département

== See also ==
- Puisieux-et-Clanlieu, in the Aisne département
- Puisieulx, in the Marne département
