= Pitcairnia nigra =

Conservation status
- Least Concern (IUCN 3.1)

Scientific classification
- Kingdom: Plantae
- Clade: Tracheophytes
- Clade: Angiosperms
- Clade: Monocots
- Clade: Commelinids
- Order: Poales
- Family: Bromeliaceae
- Genus: Pitcairnia
- Species: P. nigra

Binomial name
- Pitcairnia nigra (Carrière) André

Species of plant

Pitcairnia nigra is a species of flowering plant in the Bromeliaceae family. It is native to Ecuador.
