= Bassevelle =

- Commune
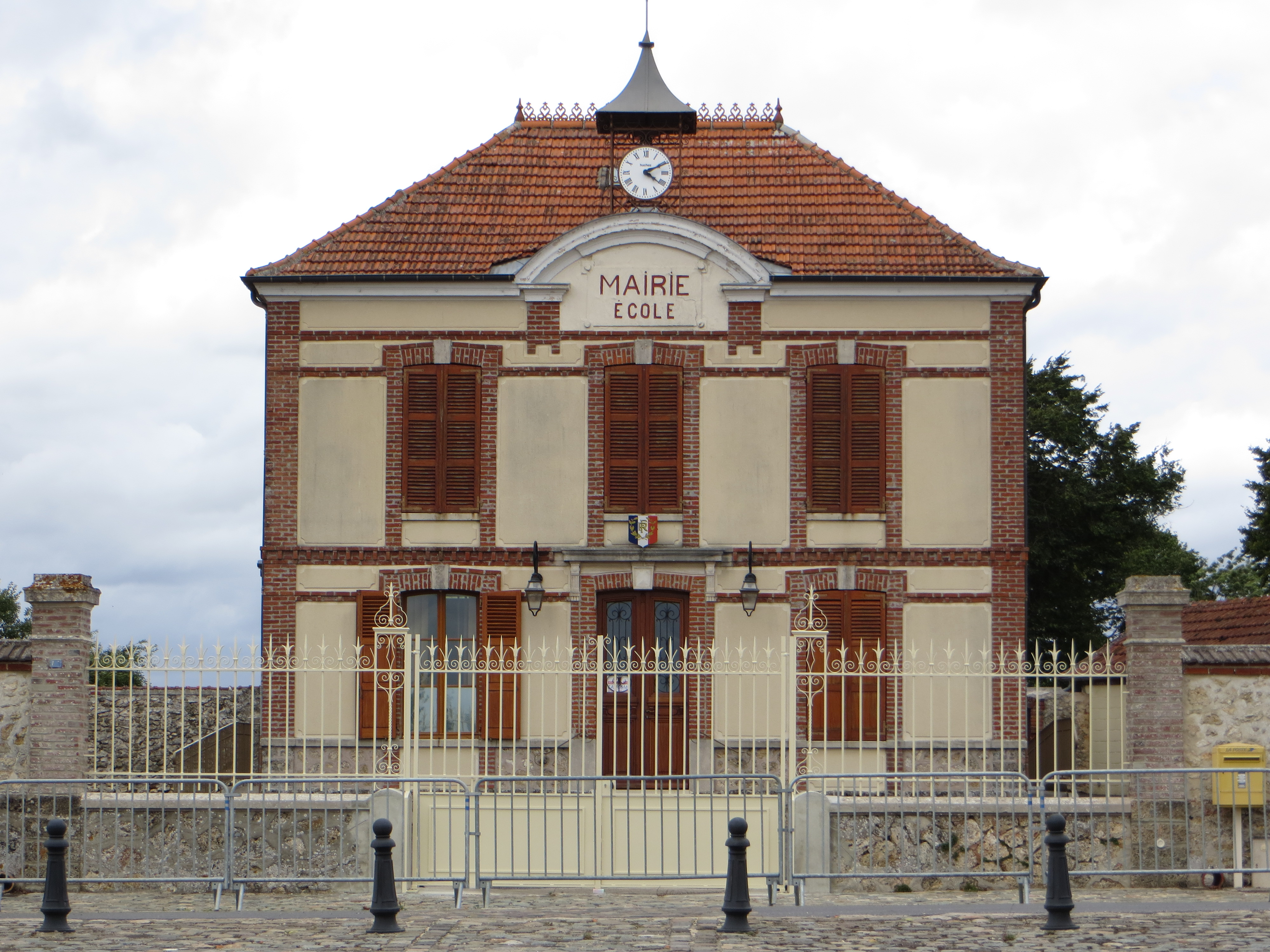
- The town hall in Bassevelle

- Coat of arms
- Location of Bassevelle
- Location within France Location within Île-de-France (region)
- Coordinates: 48°55′05″N 3°13′23″E
- Country: France
- Region: Île-de-France
- Department: Seine-et-Marne
- Arrondissement: Meaux
- Canton: La Ferté-sous-Jouarre
- Intercommunality: CA Coulommiers Pays de Brie

Government
  - Mayor (2020–2026): Jean-Marie Van Landeghem
- Area^{1}: 17.46 km^{2} (6.74 sq mi)
- Highest elevation: 206 m (676 ft)
- Lowest elevation: 104 m (341 ft)
- Population (2023): 374
  - Density: 21.4/km^{2} (55.5/sq mi)
- Time zone: UTC+01:00 (CET)
  - Summer (DST): UTC+02:00 (CEST)
- INSEE/Postal code: 77024 /77750
- ^{1} French Land Register data, which excludes lakes, ponds, glaciers > 1 km^{2} (0.386 sq mi or 247 acres) and river estuaries.

Bassevelle (French pronunciation: [basvɛl]) is a commune in the Seine-et-Marne department in the Île-de-France region in north-central France.

== Demographics ==
The inhabitants are called Bassevellois.

== See also ==
- Communes of the Seine-et-Marne department
