= Communauté de communes du Pays de l'Ourcq =

Federation of municipalities in France

Coordinates: 49.04°N 3.06°E

Pays de l'Ourcq
- Communauté de communes
- Country: France
- Region: Île-de-France
- Department: Seine-et-Marne
- No. of communes: {{{nbcomm}}}
- Established: 1973

Government
  - President: Claude Courtier
- Area: 234.7 km^{2} (90.6 sq mi)
- Population (2018): 17,546
  - Density: 74.76/km^{2} (193.6/sq mi)
- Website: www.paysdelourcq.fr

The Communauté de communes du Pays de l'Ourcq is a federation of municipalities (communauté de communes) in the Seine-et-Marne département and in the Île-de-France région of France. Established on 13 December 1973, its seat is Ocquerre. Its area is 234.7 km^{2}, and its population was 17,546 in 2018.

== Composition ==
The communauté de communes consists of the following 22 communes:

1. Armentières-en-Brie
2. Cocherel
3. Congis-sur-Thérouanne
4. Coulombs-en-Valois
5. Crouy-sur-Ourcq
6. Dhuisy
7. Douy-la-Ramée
8. Étrépilly
9. Germigny-sous-Coulombs
10. Isles-les-Meldeuses
11. Jaignes
12. Lizy-sur-Ourcq
13. Marcilly
14. Mary-sur-Marne
15. May-en-Multien
16. Ocquerre
17. Le Plessis-Placy
18. Puisieux
19. Tancrou
20. Trocy-en-Multien
21. Vendrest
22. Vincy-Manœuvre

== See also ==
- Communes of the Seine-et-Marne department
