= Canton of La Ferté-sous-Jouarre =

Coordinates: 48°57′04″N 3°08′34″E

La Ferté-sous-Jouarre
- Canton
- Country: France
- Region: Île-de-France
- Department: Seine-et-Marne
- No. of communes: {{{nbcomm}}}
- Area: 491.05 km^{2} (189.60 sq mi)
- Population (2023): 64,047
  - Density: 130.43/km^{2} (337.81/sq mi)
- INSEE code: 77 06

The canton of La Ferté-sous-Jouarre is a French administrative division, located in the arrondissement of Meaux, in the Seine-et-Marne département (Île-de-France région).

== Demographics ==
Historical population
Year	Pop.	±% p.a.
2013	60,630	—
2018	61,837	+0.40%
Source: INSEE

== Composition ==
At the French canton reorganisation which came into effect in March 2015, the canton was expanded from 19 to 47 communes:

- Armentières-en-Brie
- Bassevelle
- Bussières
- Chamigny
- Changis-sur-Marne
- Citry
- Cocherel
- Congis-sur-Thérouanne
- Coulombs-en-Valois
- Crouy-sur-Ourcq
- Dhuisy
- Douy-la-Ramée
- Étrépilly
- La Ferté-sous-Jouarre
- Fublaines
- Germigny-l'Évêque
- Germigny-sous-Coulombs
- Isles-les-Meldeuses
- Jaignes
- Jouarre
- Lizy-sur-Ourcq
- Luzancy
- Marcilly
- Mary-sur-Marne
- May-en-Multien
- Méry-sur-Marne
- Montceaux-lès-Meaux
- Nanteuil-lès-Meaux
- Nanteuil-sur-Marne
- Ocquerre
- Pierre-Levée
- Le Plessis-Placy
- Poincy
- Puisieux
- Reuil-en-Brie
- Saâcy-sur-Marne
- Sainte-Aulde
- Saint-Jean-les-Deux-Jumeaux
- Sammeron
- Sept-Sorts
- Signy-Signets
- Tancrou
- Trilport
- Trocy-en-Multien
- Ussy-sur-Marne
- Vendrest
- Vincy-Manœuvre

== See also ==
- Cantons of the Seine-et-Marne department
- Communes of the Seine-et-Marne department
