= Pierre-Levée =

- Commune
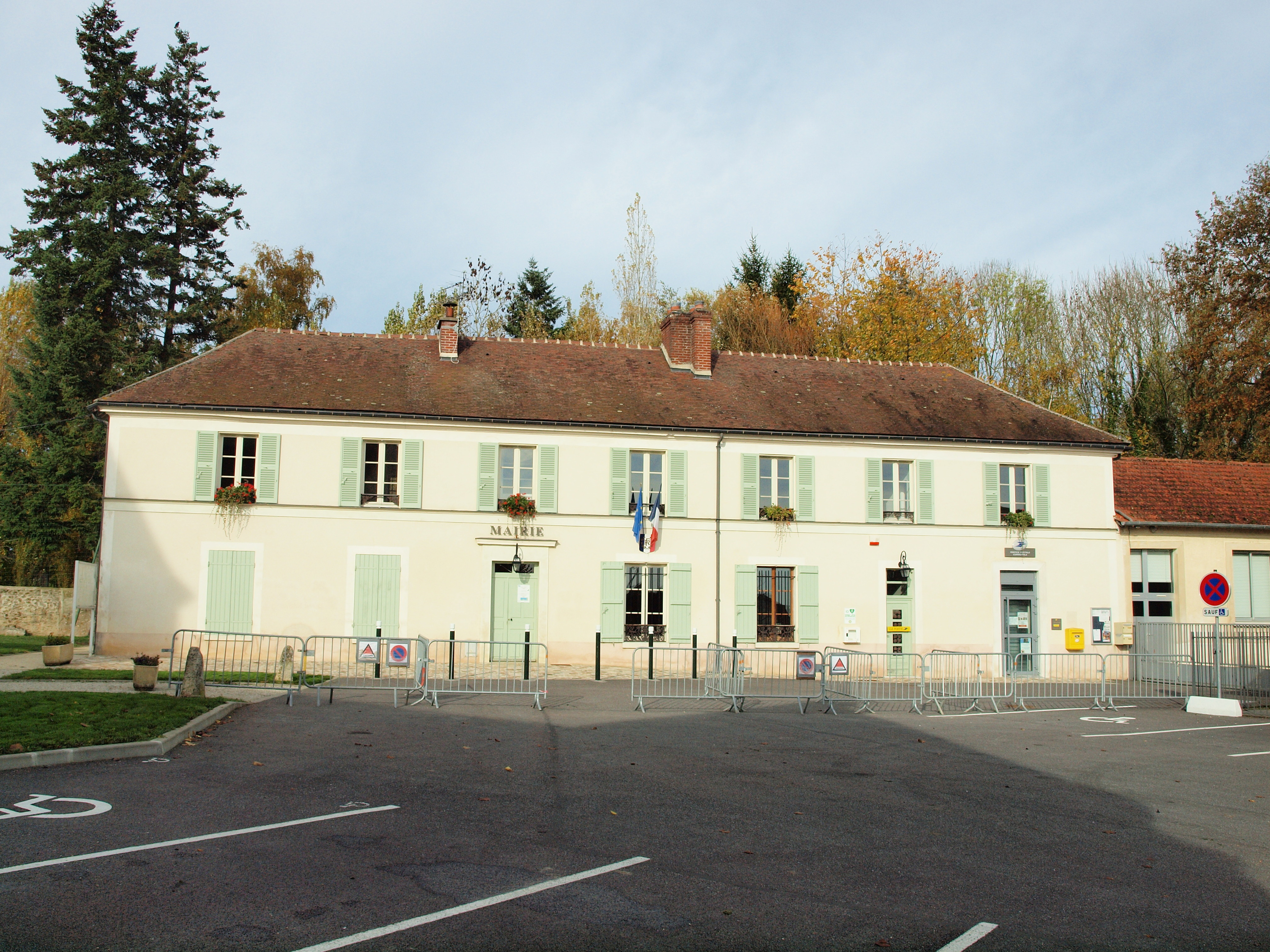
- The town hall in Pierre-Levée

- Coat of arms
- Location of Pierre-Levée
- Location within France Location within Île-de-France (region)
- Coordinates: 48°53′55″N 3°02′15″E
- Country: France
- Region: Île-de-France
- Department: Seine-et-Marne
- Arrondissement: Meaux
- Canton: La Ferté-sous-Jouarre
- Intercommunality: CA Coulommiers Pays de Brie

Government
  - Mayor (2020–2026): Philippe Deswarte
- Area^{1}: 12.93 km^{2} (4.99 sq mi)
- Highest elevation: 172 m (564 ft)
- Lowest elevation: 142 m (466 ft)
- Population (2023): 480
  - Density: 37/km^{2} (96/sq mi)
- Time zone: UTC+01:00 (CET)
  - Summer (DST): UTC+02:00 (CEST)
- INSEE/Postal code: 77361 /77580
- ^{1} French Land Register data, which excludes lakes, ponds, glaciers > 1 km^{2} (0.386 sq mi or 247 acres) and river estuaries.

Pierre-Levée (French pronunciation: [pjɛʁ ləve]) is a commune in the Seine-et-Marne department in the Île-de-France region in north-central France.

== Demographics ==
Inhabitants are called Pierrelevéens.

== See also ==
- Communes of the Seine-et-Marne department
