= Citry =

- Commune
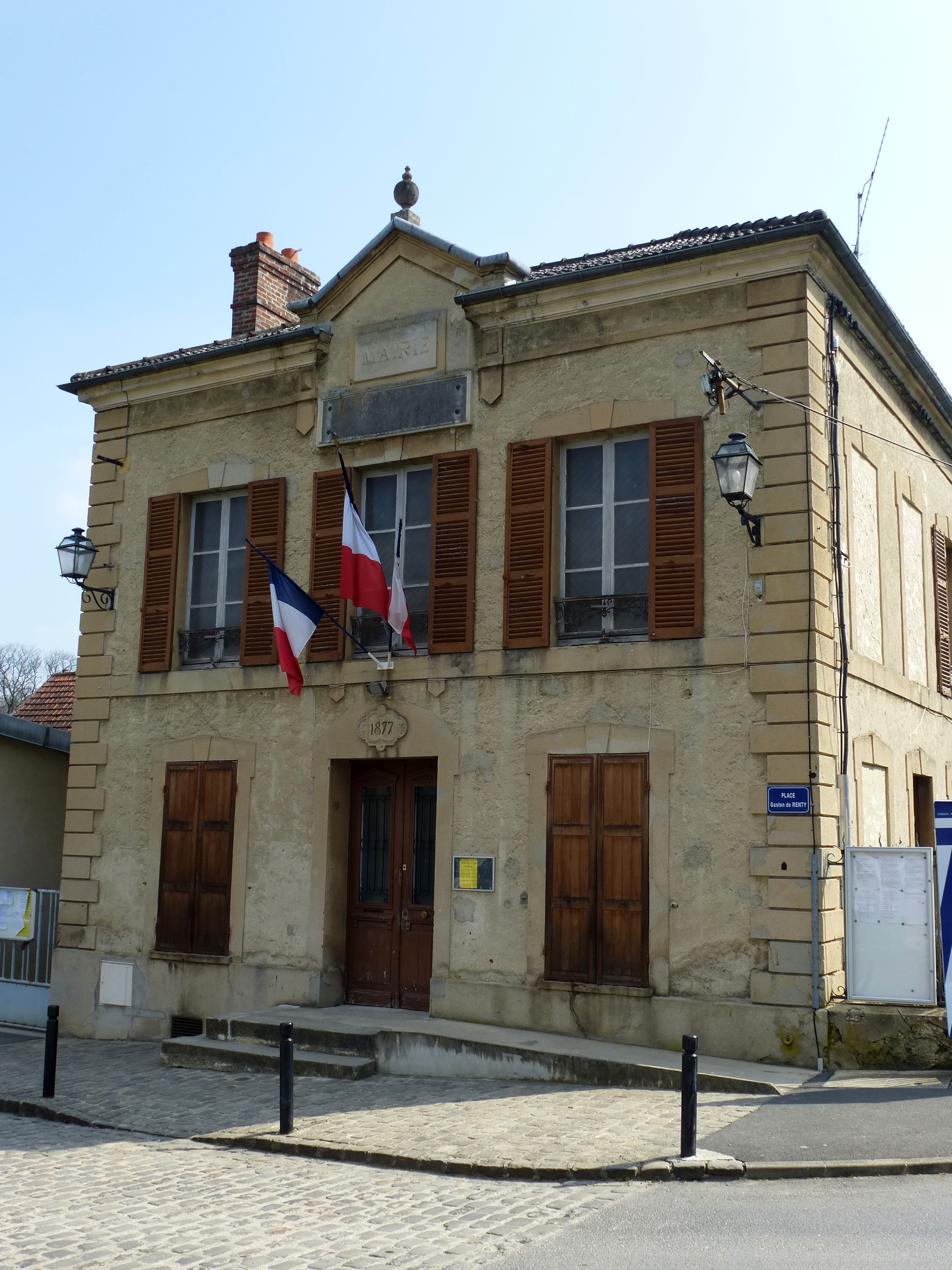
- The town hall in Citry

- Coat of arms
- Location of Citry
- Location within France Location within Île-de-France (region)
- Coordinates: 48°58′07″N 3°14′19″E
- Country: France
- Region: Île-de-France
- Department: Seine-et-Marne
- Arrondissement: Meaux
- Canton: La Ferté-sous-Jouarre
- Intercommunality: CA Coulommiers Pays de Brie

Government
  - Mayor (2020–2026): Thierry Fleischman
- Area^{1}: 5.04 km^{2} (1.95 sq mi)
- Highest elevation: 191 m (627 ft)
- Lowest elevation: 54 m (177 ft)
- Population (2023): 922
  - Density: 183/km^{2} (474/sq mi)
- Time zone: UTC+01:00 (CET)
  - Summer (DST): UTC+02:00 (CEST)
- INSEE/Postal code: 77117 /77730
- ^{1} French Land Register data, which excludes lakes, ponds, glaciers > 1 km^{2} (0.386 sq mi or 247 acres) and river estuaries.

Citry (French pronunciation: [sitʁi]) is a commune in the Seine-et-Marne department in the Île-de-France region in north-central France.

== Demographics ==
The inhabitants are called Citryats.

== See also ==
- Communes of the Seine-et-Marne department
