= Congis-sur-Thérouanne =

- Commune
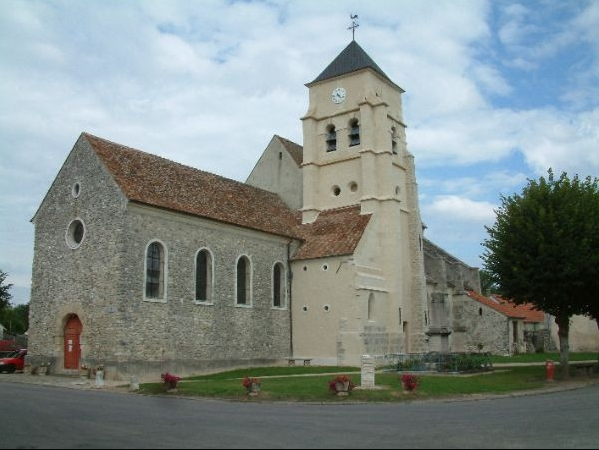
- The church in Congis-sur-Thérouanne
- Location of Congis-sur-Thérouanne
- Location within France Location within Île-de-France (region)
- Coordinates: 49°00′28″N 2°58′34″E
- Country: France
- Region: Île-de-France
- Department: Seine-et-Marne
- Arrondissement: Meaux
- Canton: La Ferté-sous-Jouarre
- Intercommunality: CC Pays de l'Ourcq

Government
  - Mayor (2020–2026): Philippe Mimmas
- Area^{1}: 15.12 km^{2} (5.84 sq mi)
- Highest elevation: 122 m (400 ft)
- Lowest elevation: 42 m (138 ft)
- Population (2023): 1,772
  - Density: 117.2/km^{2} (303.5/sq mi)
- Time zone: UTC+01:00 (CET)
  - Summer (DST): UTC+02:00 (CEST)
- INSEE/Postal code: 77126 /77440
- ^{1} French Land Register data, which excludes lakes, ponds, glaciers > 1 km^{2} (0.386 sq mi or 247 acres) and river estuaries.

Congis-sur-Thérouanne (French pronunciation: [kɔ̃ʒi syʁ teʁwan]) is a commune in the Seine-et-Marne department in the Île-de-France region in north-central France.

== Demographics ==
The inhabitants are called Congissois.

== Schools ==
The communal preschool and elementary school is the École "Casse-Noisettes". Junior high school students attend Collège Camille-Saint-Saëns in Lizy-sur-Ourcq and Collège du Champivert in Crouy-sur-Ourcq. There is one senior high school/sixth-form college in the commune, Lycée du Gué-à-Tresmes.

== People linked to the commune ==
- Pierre Baillet, (born Paris c.1447; died Auxerre before 1513), lord of Villers-lès-Rigault, a former commune merged with Congis-sur-Thérouanne in 1807. He is interred in the Saint-Alexandre chapel, behind the choir, with his brother, Jean III Baillet, Bishop of Auxerre.
- Henri Hérouin, (1876-?), Olympic champion archer at the 1900 Summer Olympics in Paris.

== See also ==
- Communes of the Seine-et-Marne department
