= Germigny-sous-Coulombs =

- Commune
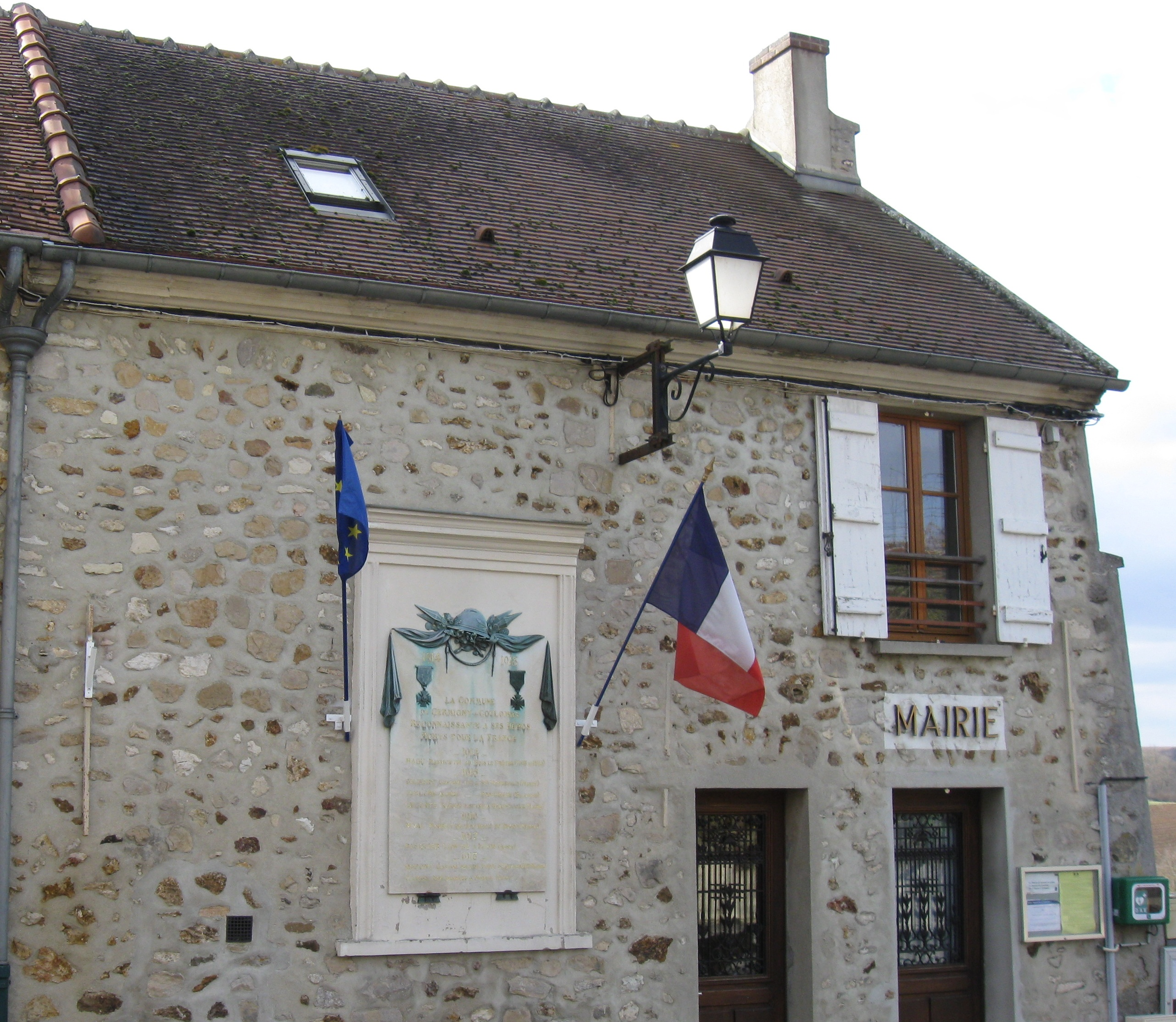
- The town hall in Germigny-sous-Coulombs
- Location of Germigny-sous-Coulombs
- Location within France Location within Île-de-France (region)
- Coordinates: 49°03′51″N 3°09′29″E
- Country: France
- Region: Île-de-France
- Department: Seine-et-Marne
- Arrondissement: Meaux
- Canton: La Ferté-sous-Jouarre
- Intercommunality: Pays de l'Ourcq

Government
  - Mayor (2020–2026): Chantal Antoine
- Area^{1}: 6.53 km^{2} (2.52 sq mi)
- Highest elevation: 196 m (643 ft)
- Lowest elevation: 83 m (272 ft)
- Population (2023): 201
  - Density: 30.8/km^{2} (79.7/sq mi)
- Time zone: UTC+01:00 (CET)
  - Summer (DST): UTC+02:00 (CEST)
- INSEE/Postal code: 77204 /77840
- ^{1} French Land Register data, which excludes lakes, ponds, glaciers > 1 km^{2} (0.386 sq mi or 247 acres) and river estuaries.

Germigny-sous-Coulombs (French pronunciation: [ʒɛʁmiɲi su kulɔ̃], literally Germigny under Coulombs) is a commune in the Seine-et-Marne department in the Île-de-France region in north-central France.

== Demographics ==
Inhabitants are called Germinois.

== See also ==
- Communes of the Seine-et-Marne department
