= Isles-les-Meldeuses =

- Commune
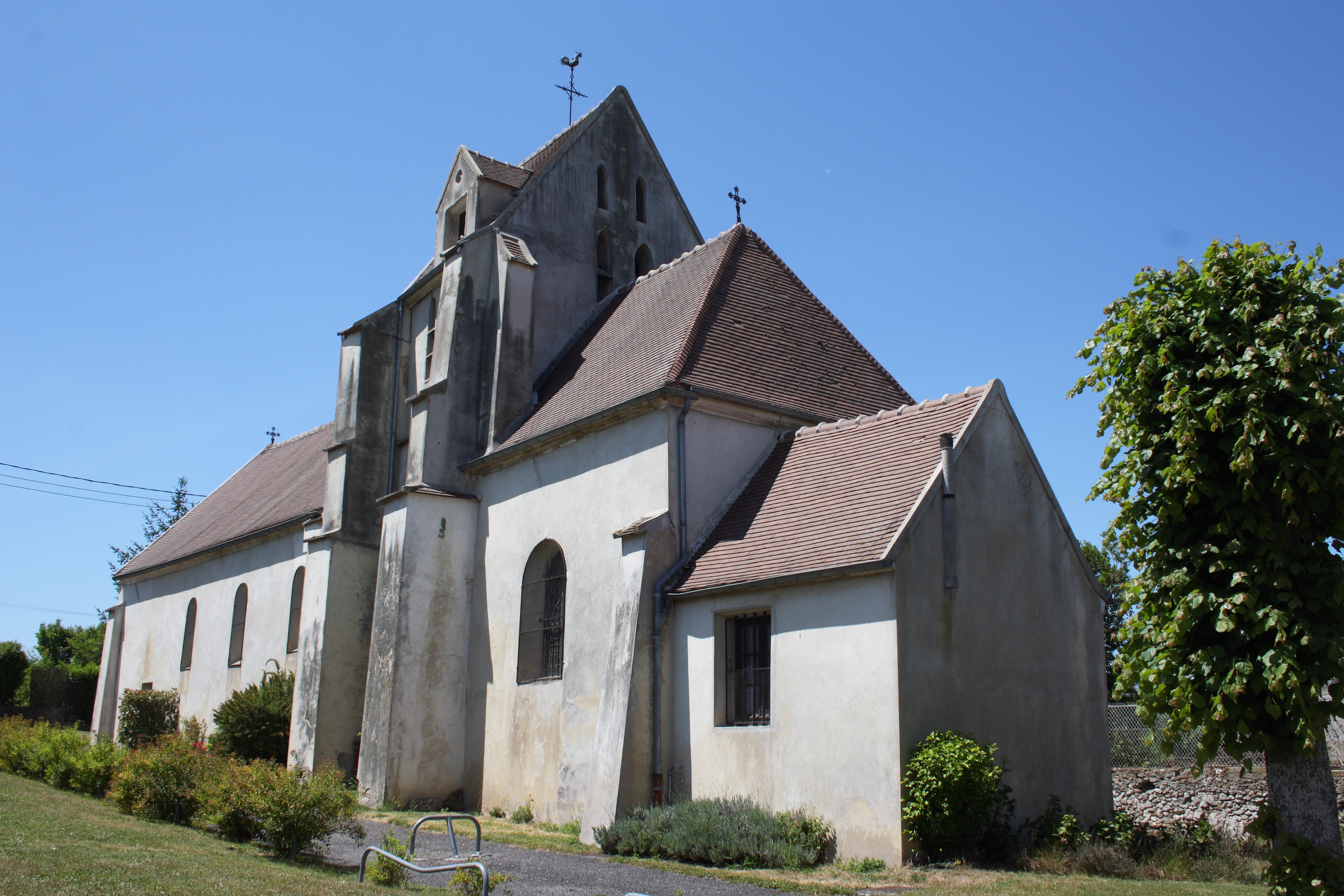
- The church in Isles-les-Meldeuses

- Coat of arms
- Location of Isles-les-Meldeuses
- Location within France Location within Île-de-France (region)
- Coordinates: 48°59′57″N 3°00′25″E
- Country: France
- Region: Île-de-France
- Department: Seine-et-Marne
- Arrondissement: Meaux
- Canton: La Ferté-sous-Jouarre
- Intercommunality: Pays de l'Ourcq

Government
  - Mayor (2020–2026): Frederic Maas
- Area^{1}: 6.94 km^{2} (2.68 sq mi)
- Highest elevation: 119 m (390 ft)
- Lowest elevation: 42 m (138 ft)
- Population (2023): 760
  - Density: 110/km^{2} (280/sq mi)
- Time zone: UTC+01:00 (CET)
  - Summer (DST): UTC+02:00 (CEST)
- INSEE/Postal code: 77231 /77440
- ^{1} French Land Register data, which excludes lakes, ponds, glaciers > 1 km^{2} (0.386 sq mi or 247 acres) and river estuaries.

Isles-les-Meldeuses (French pronunciation: [il le mɛldøz]) is a commune in the Seine-et-Marne department in the Île-de-France region in north-central France.

== Demographics ==
Inhabitants are called Iléo-Meldois.

== See also ==
- Communes of the Seine-et-Marne department
