= May-en-Multien =

- Commune
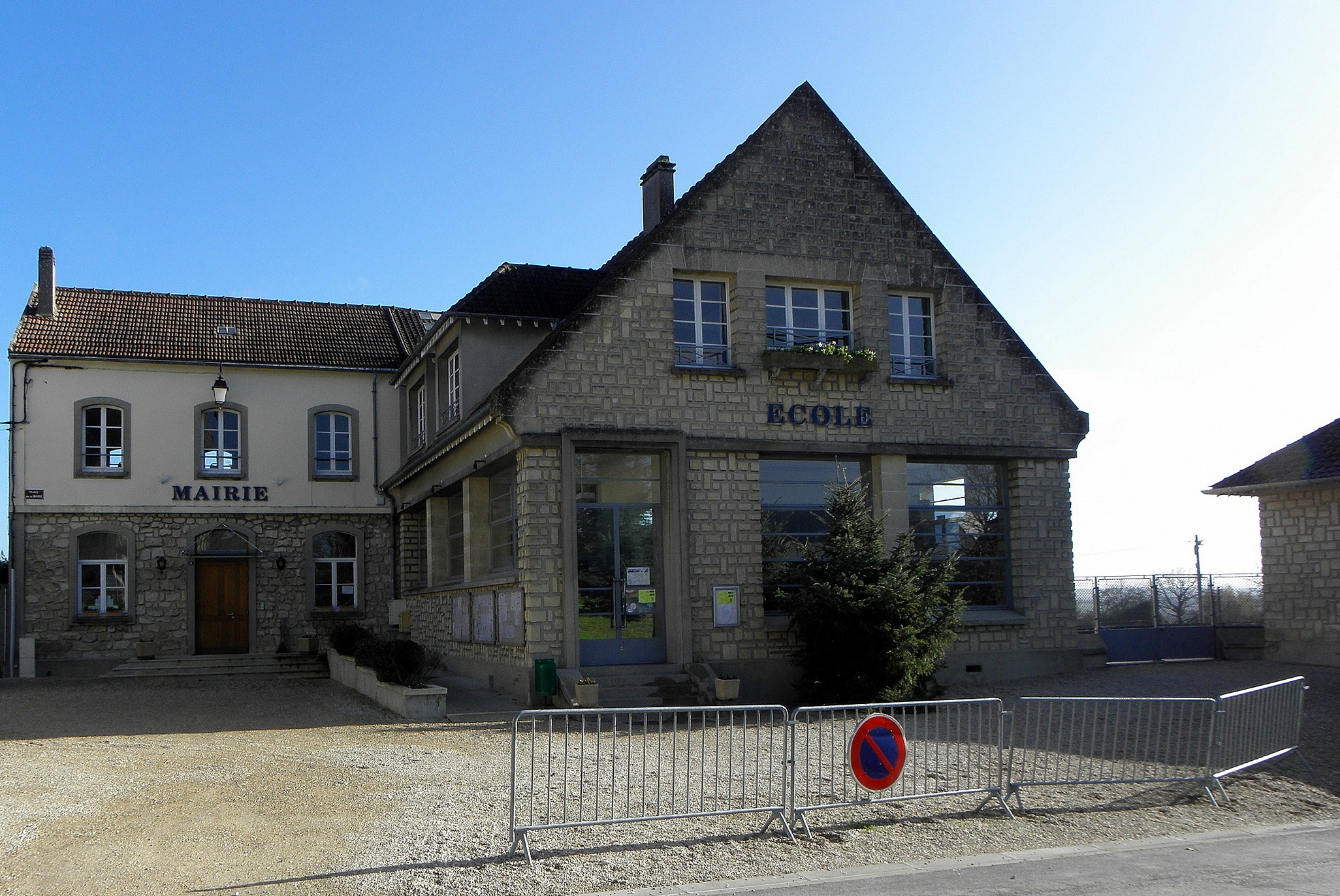
- The town hall in May-en-Multien
- Location of May-en-Multien
- Location within France Location within Île-de-France (region)
- Coordinates: 49°04′20″N 3°01′25″E
- Country: France
- Region: Île-de-France
- Department: Seine-et-Marne
- Arrondissement: Meaux
- Canton: La Ferté-sous-Jouarre
- Intercommunality: Pays de l'Ourcq

Government
  - Mayor (2024–2026): Alain Forestier
- Area^{1}: 19.15 km^{2} (7.39 sq mi)
- Highest elevation: 149 m (489 ft)
- Lowest elevation: 52 m (171 ft)
- Population (2023): 877
  - Density: 45.8/km^{2} (119/sq mi)
- Time zone: UTC+01:00 (CET)
  - Summer (DST): UTC+02:00 (CEST)
- INSEE/Postal code: 77283 /77145
- ^{1} French Land Register data, which excludes lakes, ponds, glaciers > 1 km^{2} (0.386 sq mi or 247 acres) and river estuaries.

May-en-Multien (French pronunciation: [mɛ ɑ̃ myltjɛ̃]) is a commune in the Seine-et-Marne department in the Île-de-France region in north-central France.

== Demographics ==
Inhabitants are called Mahouyots.

== Notable people ==
- Élie-Abel Carrière (1818–1896), botanist, based in Paris, leading authority on conifers, was born in May-en-Multien.

== See also ==
- Communes of the Seine-et-Marne department
