= Vincy-Manœuvre =

- Commune
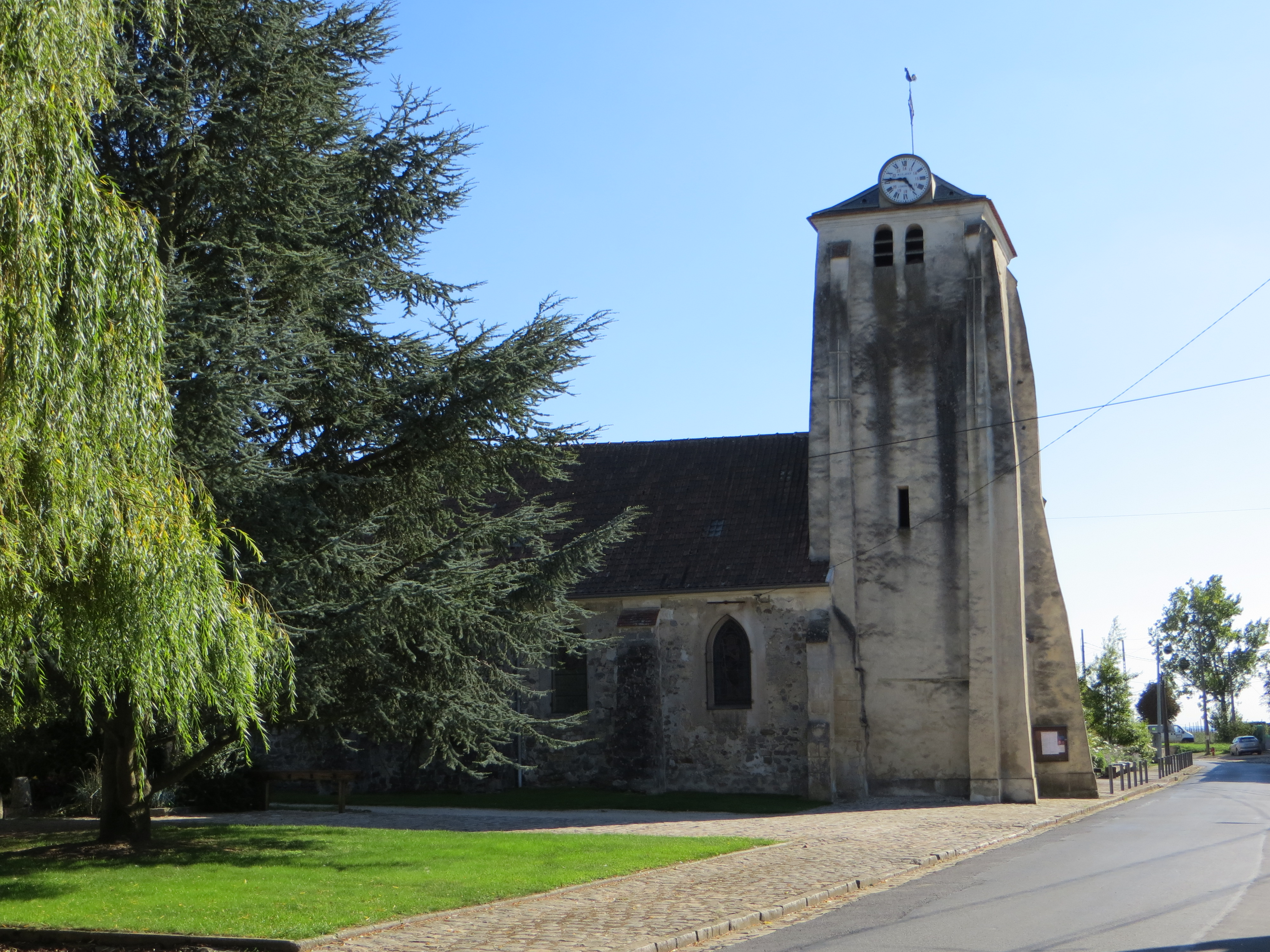
- The church in Vincy-Manœuvre
- Location of Vincy-Manœuvre
- Location within France Location within Île-de-France (region)
- Coordinates: 49°04′42″N 2°57′51″E
- Country: France
- Region: Île-de-France
- Department: Seine-et-Marne
- Arrondissement: Meaux
- Canton: La Ferté-sous-Jouarre
- Intercommunality: Pays de l'Ourcq

Government
  - Mayor (2020–2026): Gilles Durouchoux
- Area^{1}: 4.96 km^{2} (1.92 sq mi)
- Highest elevation: 146 m (479 ft)
- Lowest elevation: 82 m (269 ft)
- Population (2023): 271
  - Density: 54.6/km^{2} (142/sq mi)
- Time zone: UTC+01:00 (CET)
  - Summer (DST): UTC+02:00 (CEST)
- INSEE/Postal code: 77526 /77139
- ^{1} French Land Register data, which excludes lakes, ponds, glaciers > 1 km^{2} (0.386 sq mi or 247 acres) and river estuaries.

Vincy-Manœuvre (French pronunciation: [vɛ̃si manœvʁ]) is a commune in the Seine-et-Marne department in the Île-de-France region in north-central France.

== Demographics ==
Inhabitants of Vincy-Manœuvre are called Viniciens.

== See also ==
- Communes of the Seine-et-Marne department
