= Armentières-en-Brie =

- Commune
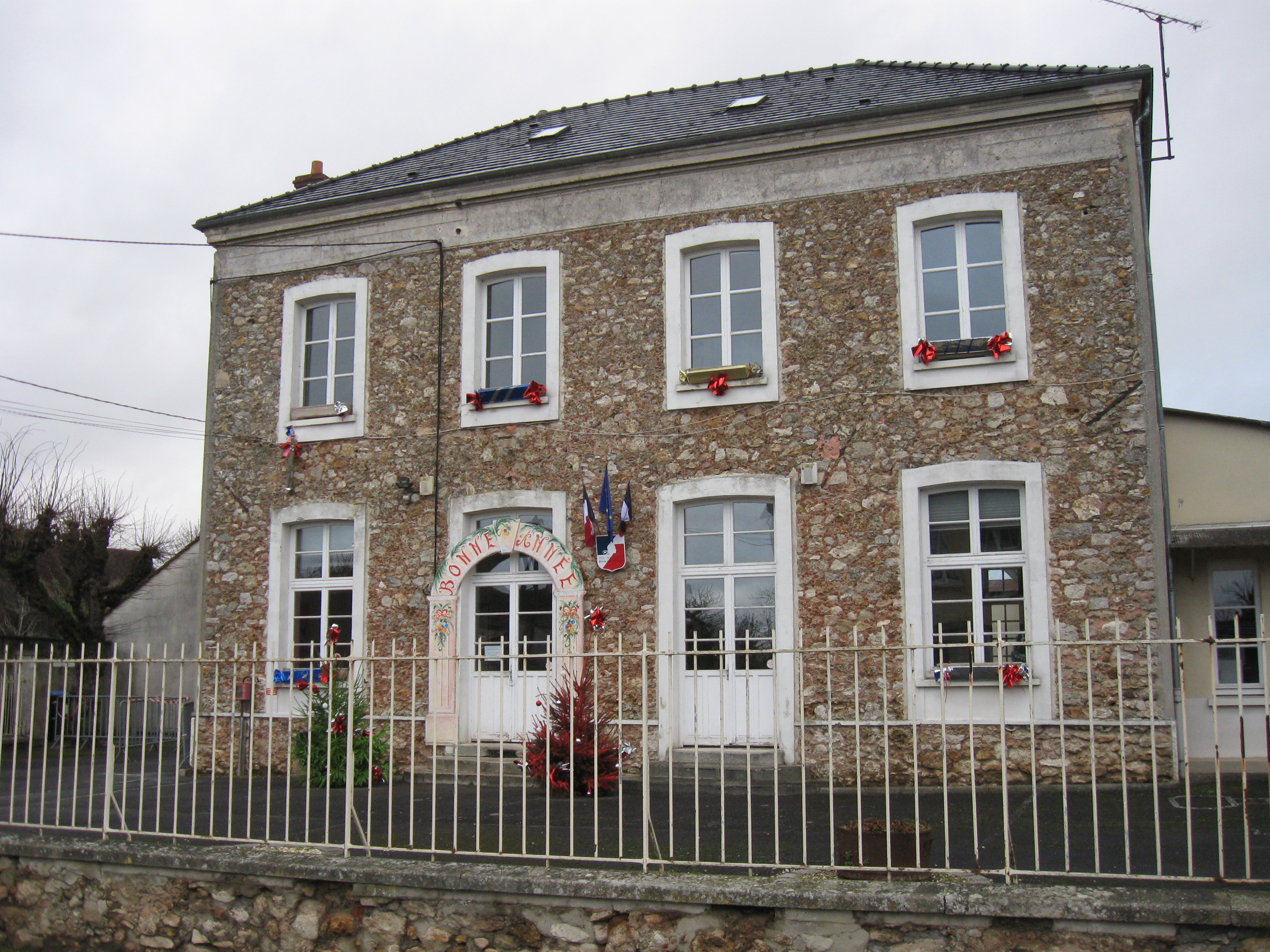
- The town hall in Armentières-en-Brie

- Coat of arms
- Location of Armentières-en-Brie
- Location within France Location within Île-de-France (region)
- Coordinates: 49°01′01″N 3°03′50″E
- Country: France
- Region: Île-de-France
- Department: Seine-et-Marne
- Arrondissement: Meaux
- Canton: La Ferté-sous-Jouarre
- Intercommunality: CC Pays Ourcq

Government
  - Mayor (2020–2026): Vincent Carré
- Area^{1}: 7.27 km^{2} (2.81 sq mi)
- Highest elevation: 113 m (371 ft)
- Lowest elevation: 47 m (154 ft)
- Population (2023): 1,176
  - Density: 162/km^{2} (419/sq mi)
- Time zone: UTC+01:00 (CET)
  - Summer (DST): UTC+02:00 (CEST)
- INSEE/Postal code: 77008 /77440
- ^{1} French Land Register data, which excludes lakes, ponds, glaciers > 1 km^{2} (0.386 sq mi or 247 acres) and river estuaries.

Armentières-en-Brie (French: [aʁmɑ̃tjɛʁ ɑ̃ bʁi]) is a commune in the Seine-et-Marne department in the Île-de-France region in north-central France.

== Demographics ==
The inhabitants are called Armentiérois.

== Transportation ==
Armentières is served by Isles - Armentières - Congis station on Transilien Line P.

== See also ==
- Communes of the Seine-et-Marne department
