= Dhuisy =

- Commune
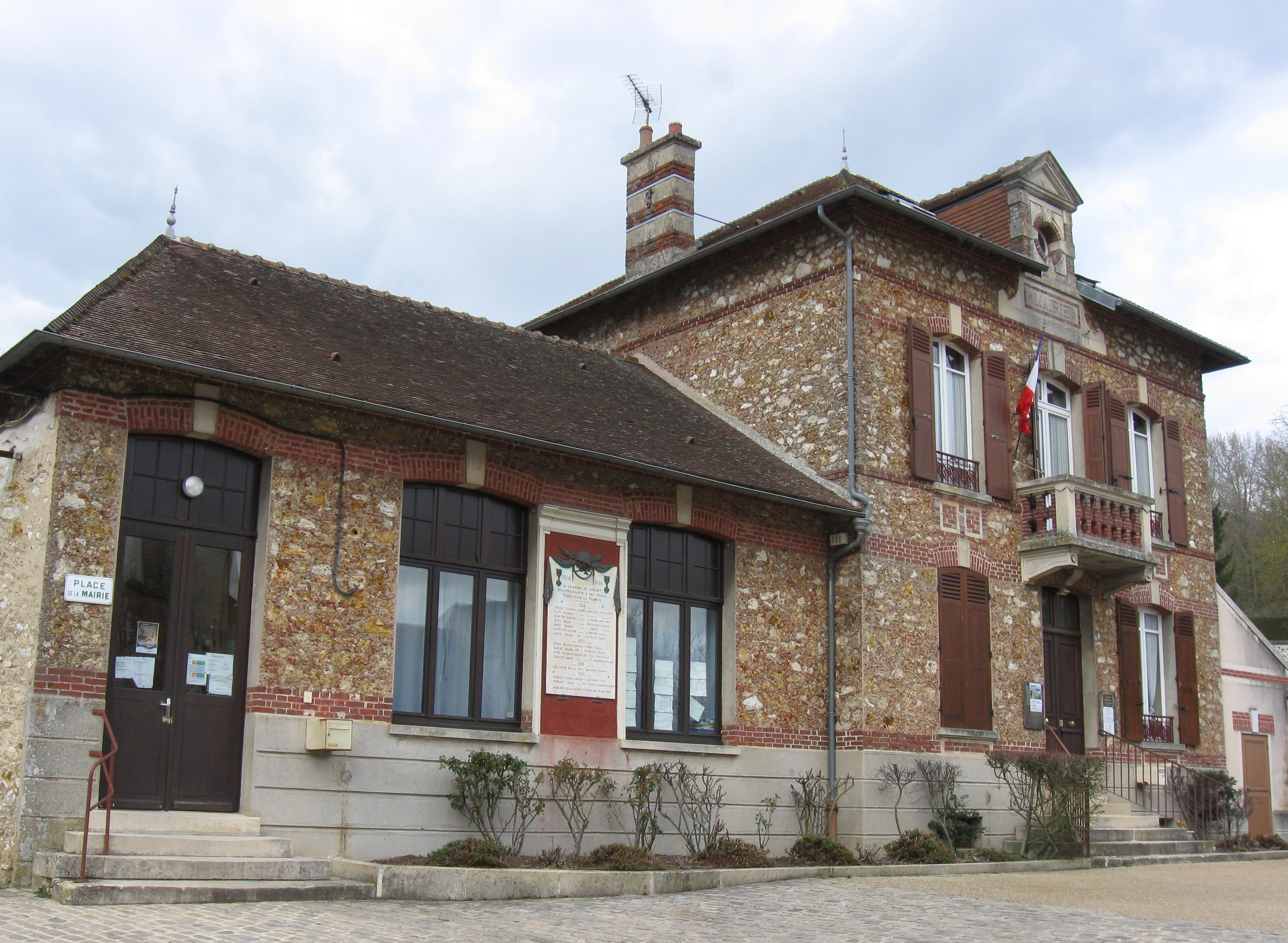
- The town hall in Dhuisy

- Coat of arms
- Location of Dhuisy
- Location within France Location within Île-de-France (region)
- Coordinates: 49°02′21″N 3°09′36″E
- Country: France
- Region: Île-de-France
- Department: Seine-et-Marne
- Arrondissement: Meaux
- Canton: La Ferté-sous-Jouarre
- Intercommunality: Pays de l'Ourcq

Government
  - Mayor (2020–2026): Isabelle Faoucher
- Area^{1}: 8.14 km^{2} (3.14 sq mi)
- Highest elevation: 211 m (692 ft)
- Lowest elevation: 117 m (384 ft)
- Population (2023): 334
  - Density: 41.0/km^{2} (106/sq mi)
- Time zone: UTC+01:00 (CET)
  - Summer (DST): UTC+02:00 (CEST)
- INSEE/Postal code: 77157 /77440
- ^{1} French Land Register data, which excludes lakes, ponds, glaciers > 1 km^{2} (0.386 sq mi or 247 acres) and river estuaries.

Dhuisy (French pronunciation: [dɥizi]) is a commune in the Seine-et-Marne department in the Île-de-France region in north-central France.

== Demographics ==
Inhabitants of Dhuisy are called Dhuiséens.

== See also ==
- Communes of the Seine-et-Marne department
