= Mary-sur-Marne =

- Commune
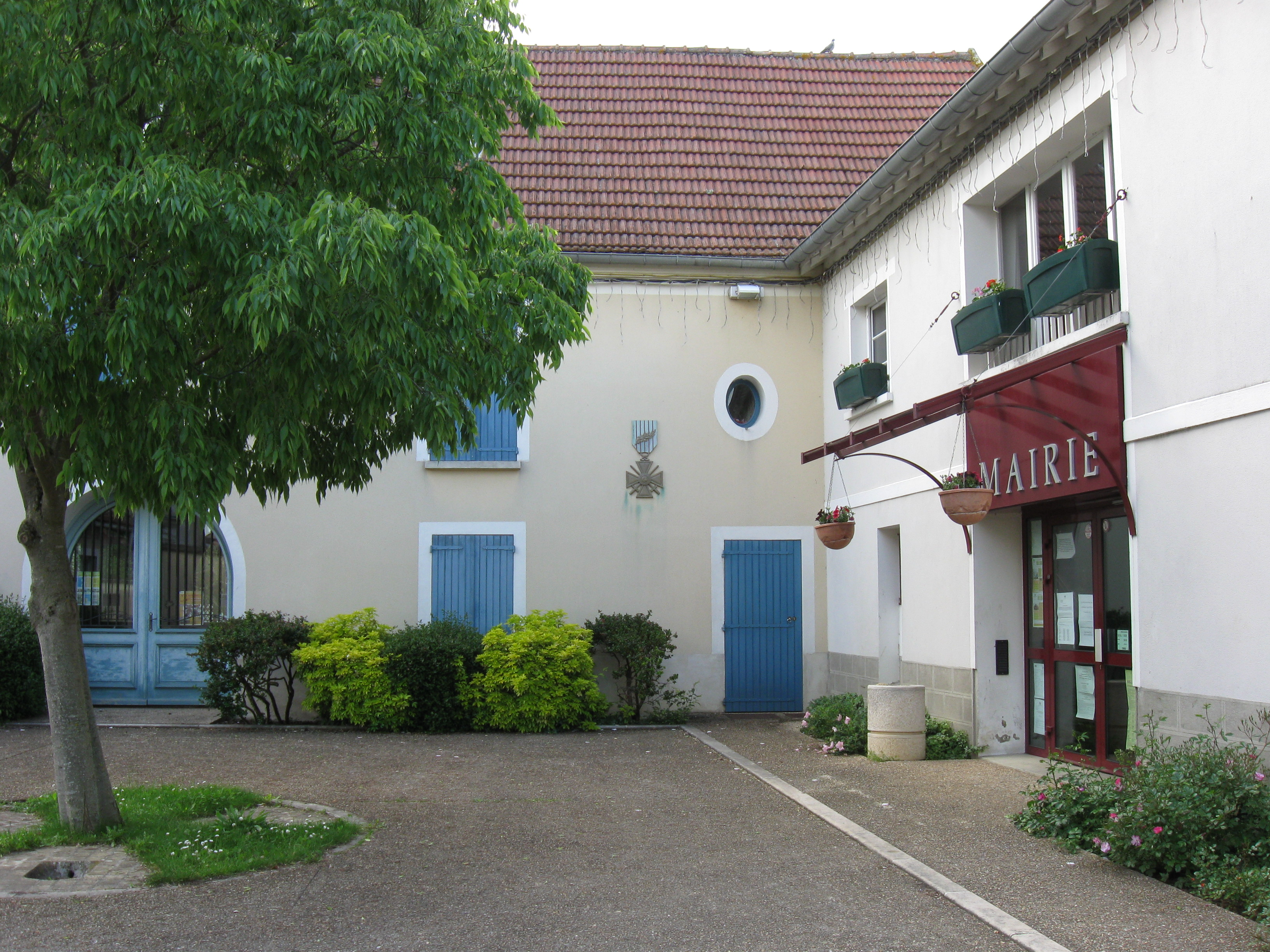
- The town hall in Mary-sur-Marne
- Location of Mary-sur-Marne
- Location within France Location within Île-de-France (region)
- Coordinates: 49°01′N 3°02′E
- Country: France
- Region: Île-de-France
- Department: Seine-et-Marne
- Arrondissement: Meaux
- Canton: La Ferté-sous-Jouarre
- Intercommunality: Pays de l'Ourcq

Government
  - Mayor (2020–2026): Yves Parigi
- Area^{1}: 2.22 km^{2} (0.86 sq mi)
- Highest elevation: 123 m (404 ft)
- Lowest elevation: 44 m (144 ft)
- Population (2023): 1,155
  - Density: 520/km^{2} (1,350/sq mi)
- Time zone: UTC+01:00 (CET)
  - Summer (DST): UTC+02:00 (CEST)
- INSEE/Postal code: 77280 /77440
- ^{1} French Land Register data, which excludes lakes, ponds, glaciers > 1 km^{2} (0.386 sq mi or 247 acres) and river estuaries.

Mary-sur-Marne (French: [maʁi syʁ maʁn]) is a commune in the Seine-et-Marne department in the Île-de-France region in north-central France.

== Demographics ==
Inhabitants are called Marysiens.

== See also ==
- Communes of the Seine-et-Marne department
