= Douy-la-Ramée =

- Commune
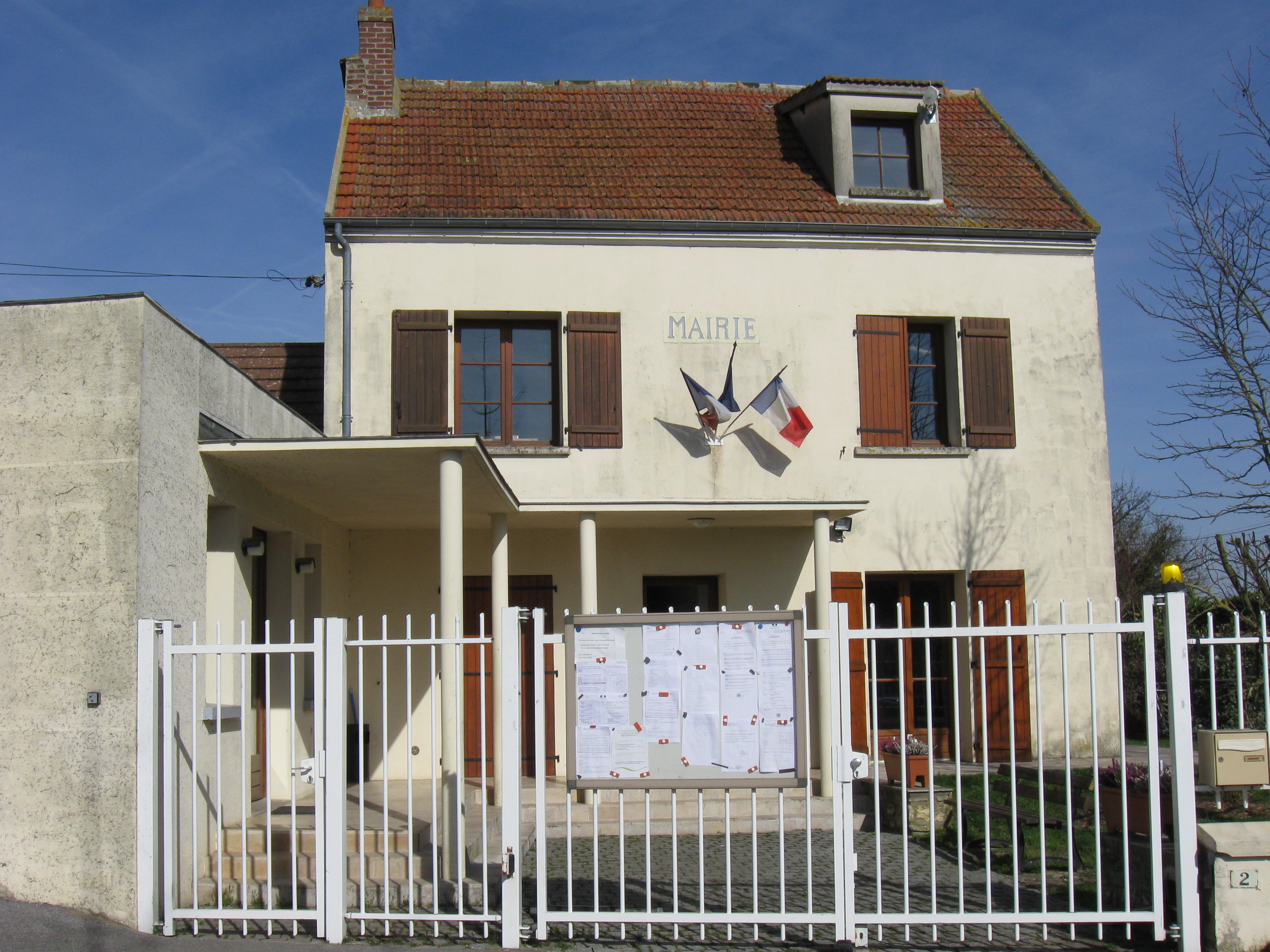
- The town hall in Douy-la-Ramée
- Location of Douy-la-Ramée
- Location within France Location within Île-de-France (region)
- Coordinates: 49°03′59″N 2°52′53″E
- Country: France
- Region: Île-de-France
- Department: Seine-et-Marne
- Arrondissement: Meaux
- Canton: La Ferté-sous-Jouarre
- Intercommunality: Pays de l'Ourcq

Government
  - Mayor (2020–2026): Nadine Caron
- Area^{1}: 7.97 km^{2} (3.08 sq mi)
- Highest elevation: 127 m (417 ft)
- Lowest elevation: 73 m (240 ft)
- Population (2023): 395
  - Density: 49.6/km^{2} (128/sq mi)
- Time zone: UTC+01:00 (CET)
  - Summer (DST): UTC+02:00 (CEST)
- INSEE/Postal code: 77163 /77139
- ^{1} French Land Register data, which excludes lakes, ponds, glaciers > 1 km^{2} (0.386 sq mi or 247 acres) and river estuaries.

Douy-la-Ramée (French pronunciation: [dwi la ʁame]) is a commune in the Seine-et-Marne department in the Île-de-France region in north-central France.

== Demographics ==
Inhabitants of Douy-la-Ramée are called Doyacois.

== See also ==
- Communes of the Seine-et-Marne department
