= Ocquerre =

- Commune
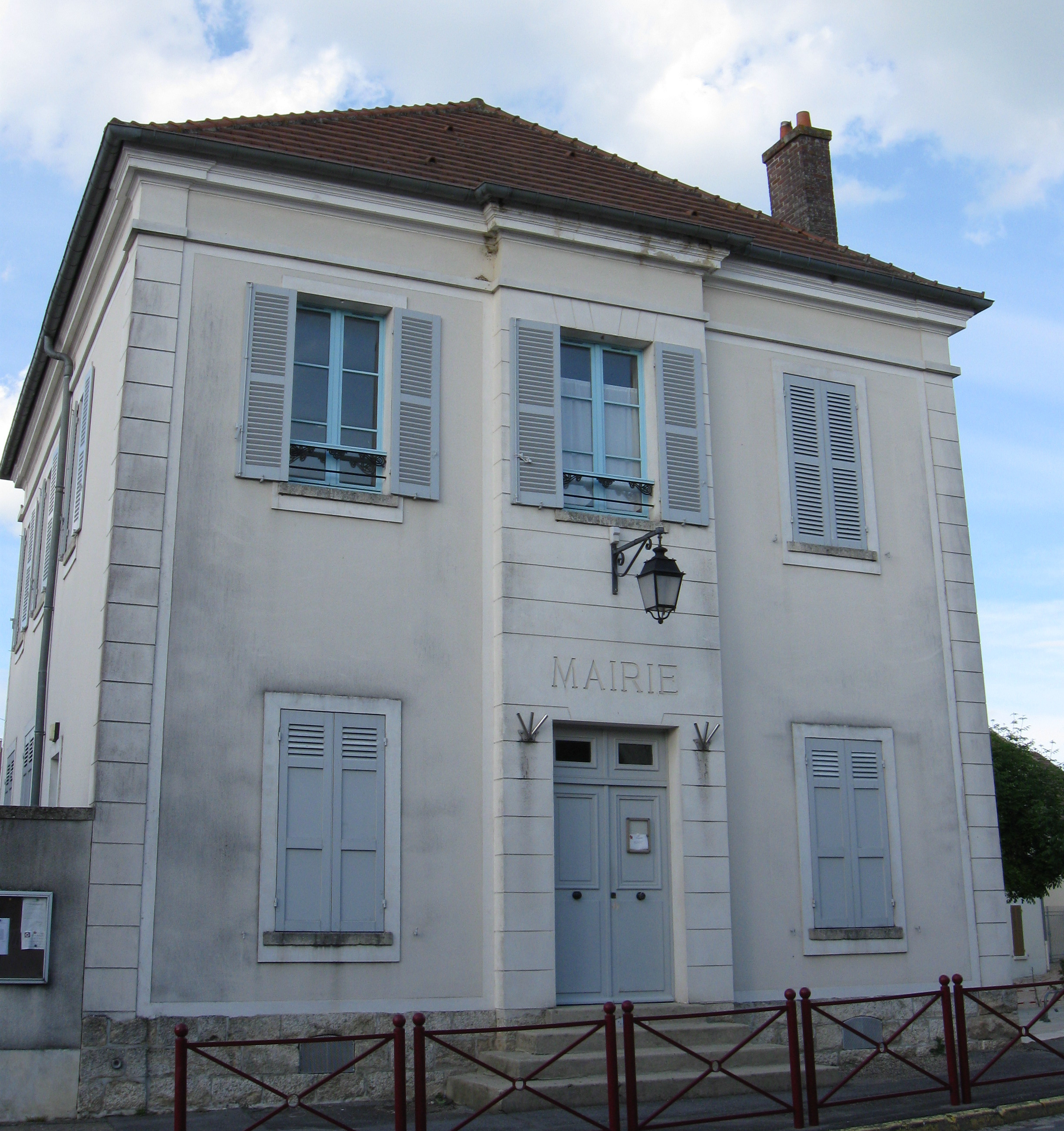
- The town hall of Ocquerre

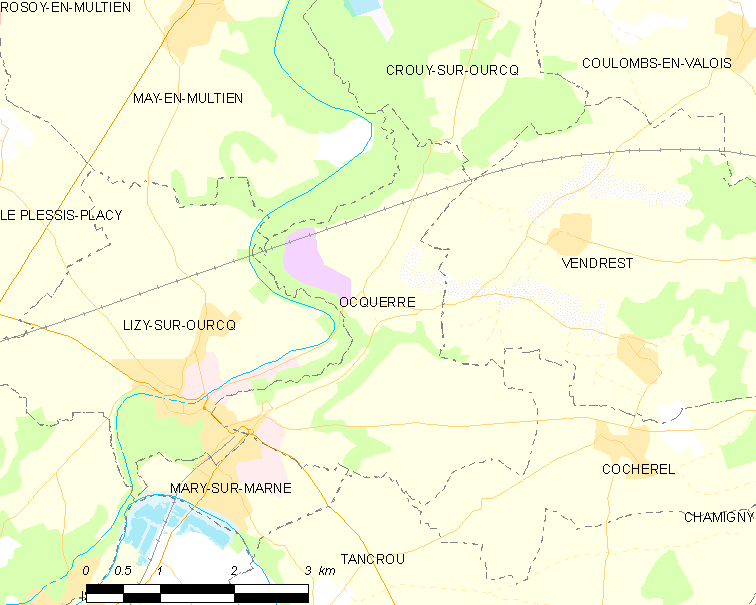
- Location of Ocquerre
- Location within France Location within Île-de-France (region)
- Coordinates: 49°02′17″N 3°03′27″E
- Country: France
- Region: Île-de-France
- Department: Seine-et-Marne
- Arrondissement: Meaux
- Canton: La Ferté-sous-Jouarre
- Intercommunality: Pays de l'Ourcq

Government
  - Mayor (2020–2026): Bruno Gautier
- Area^{1}: 10.12 km^{2} (3.91 sq mi)
- Highest elevation: 163 m (535 ft)
- Lowest elevation: 51 m (167 ft)
- Population (2023): 378
  - Density: 37.4/km^{2} (96.7/sq mi)
- Time zone: UTC+01:00 (CET)
  - Summer (DST): UTC+02:00 (CEST)
- INSEE/Postal code: 77343 /77440
- ^{1} French Land Register data, which excludes lakes, ponds, glaciers > 1 km^{2} (0.386 sq mi or 247 acres) and river estuaries.

Ocquerre (French: [ɔkɛʁ]) is a commune in the Seine-et-Marne department in the Île-de-France region in north-central France.

== Demographics ==
Inhabitants are called Ocquerrois.

== See also ==
- Communes of the Seine-et-Marne department
