= Vendrest =

- Commune
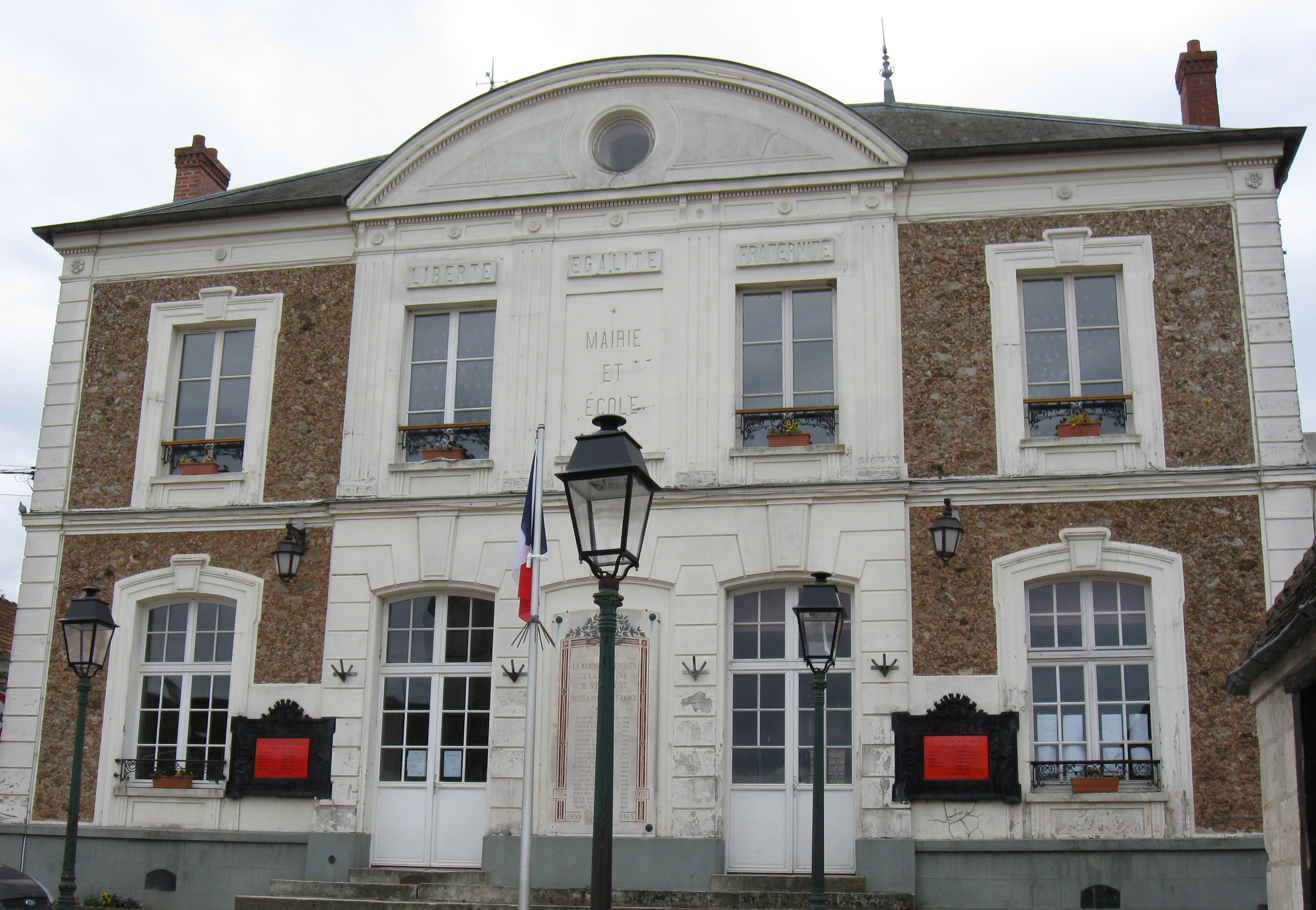
- The town hall in Vendrest
- Location of Vendrest
- Location within France Location within Île-de-France (region)
- Coordinates: 49°02′50″N 3°05′41″E
- Country: France
- Region: Île-de-France
- Department: Seine-et-Marne
- Arrondissement: Meaux
- Canton: La Ferté-sous-Jouarre
- Intercommunality: Pays de l'Ourcq

Government
  - Mayor (2020–2026): Francis Chesné
- Area^{1}: 17.73 km^{2} (6.85 sq mi)
- Highest elevation: 206 m (676 ft)
- Lowest elevation: 66 m (217 ft)
- Population (2023): 686
  - Density: 38.7/km^{2} (100/sq mi)
- Time zone: UTC+01:00 (CET)
  - Summer (DST): UTC+02:00 (CEST)
- INSEE/Postal code: 77490 /77440
- ^{1} French Land Register data, which excludes lakes, ponds, glaciers > 1 km^{2} (0.386 sq mi or 247 acres) and river estuaries.

Vendrest is a commune in the Seine-et-Marne department in the Île-de-France region in north-central France.

== Demographics ==
Inhabitants of Vendrest are called Vendrestois.

== See also ==
- Communes of the Seine-et-Marne department
