= Trocy-en-Multien =

- Commune
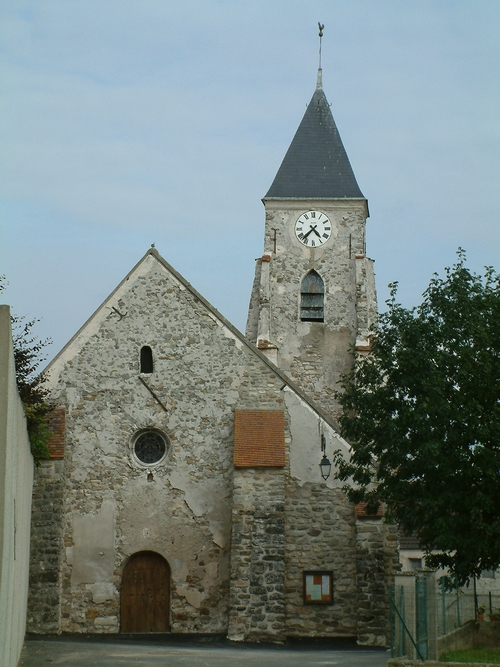
- The church in Trocy-en-Multien
- Location of Trocy-en-Multien
- Location within France Location within Île-de-France (region)
- Coordinates: 49°02′32″N 2°57′44″E
- Country: France
- Region: Île-de-France
- Department: Seine-et-Marne
- Arrondissement: Meaux
- Canton: La Ferté-sous-Jouarre
- Intercommunality: Pays de l'Ourcq

Government
  - Mayor (2020–2026): Arnaud Rousseau
- Area^{1}: 7.46 km^{2} (2.88 sq mi)
- Highest elevation: 141 m (463 ft)
- Lowest elevation: 65 m (213 ft)
- Population (2023): 233
  - Density: 31.2/km^{2} (80.9/sq mi)
- Time zone: UTC+01:00 (CET)
  - Summer (DST): UTC+02:00 (CEST)
- INSEE/Postal code: 77476 /77440
- ^{1} French Land Register data, which excludes lakes, ponds, glaciers > 1 km^{2} (0.386 sq mi or 247 acres) and river estuaries.

Trocy-en-Multien (French pronunciation: [tʁɔsi ɑ̃ myltjɛ̃]) is a commune in the Seine-et-Marne department in the Île-de-France region in north-central France.

== Demographics ==
Inhabitants of Trocy-en-Multien are called Trocéens.

== See also ==
- Communes of the Seine-et-Marne department
