= Le Plessis-Placy =

- Commune
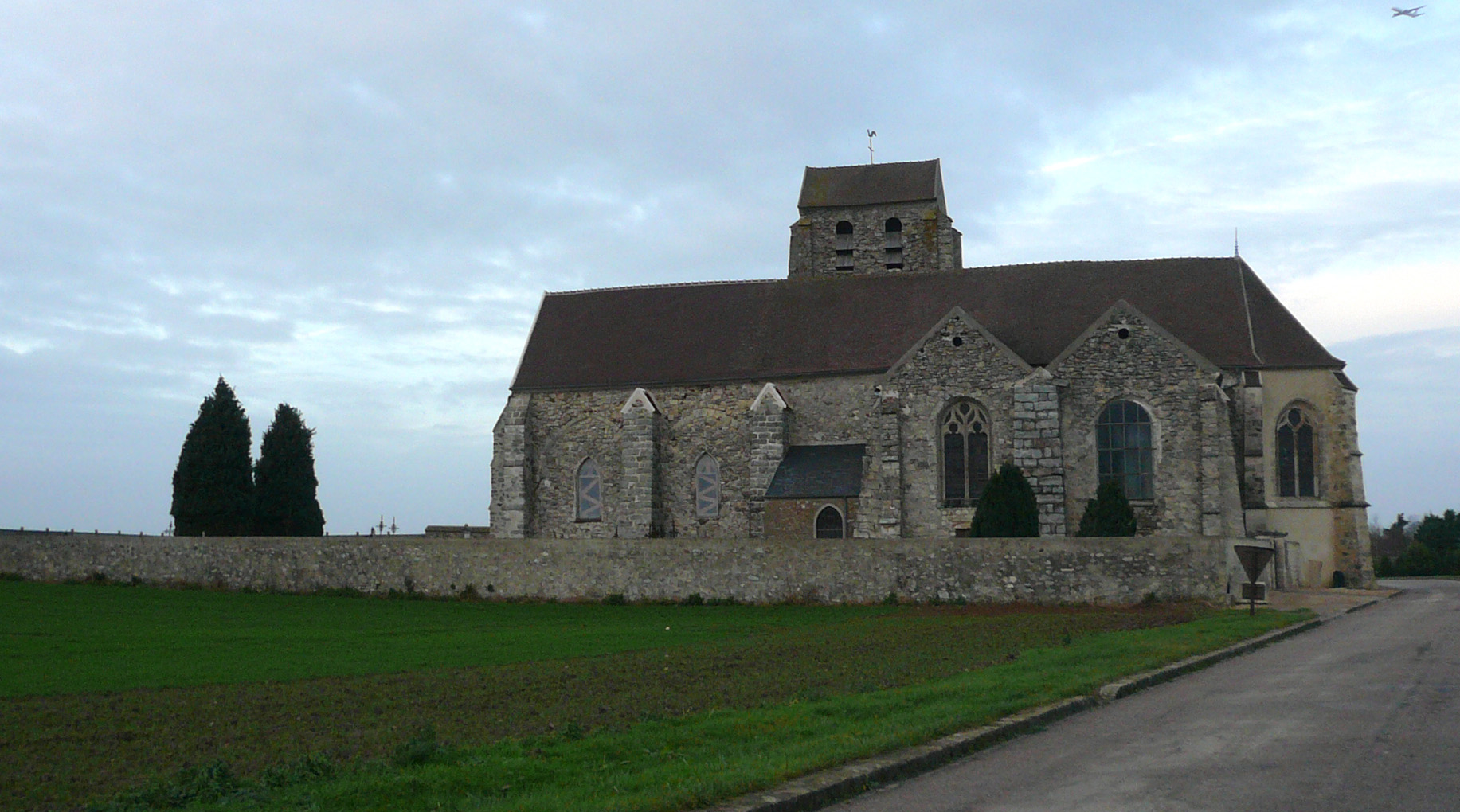
- The church in Le Plessis-Placy
- Location of Le Plessis-Placy
- Location within France Location within Île-de-France (region)
- Coordinates: 49°03′28″N 2°59′20″E
- Country: France
- Region: Île-de-France
- Department: Seine-et-Marne
- Arrondissement: Meaux
- Canton: La Ferté-sous-Jouarre
- Intercommunality: Pays de l'Ourcq

Government
  - Mayor (2020–2026): Charles-Auguste Benoist
- Area^{1}: 8.20 km^{2} (3.17 sq mi)
- Highest elevation: 149 m (489 ft)
- Lowest elevation: 89 m (292 ft)
- Population (2023): 305
  - Density: 37.2/km^{2} (96.3/sq mi)
- Time zone: UTC+01:00 (CET)
  - Summer (DST): UTC+02:00 (CEST)
- INSEE/Postal code: 77367 /77440
- ^{1} French Land Register data, which excludes lakes, ponds, glaciers > 1 km^{2} (0.386 sq mi or 247 acres) and river estuaries.

Le Plessis-Placy (French pronunciation: [lə plɛsi plasi]) is a commune in the Seine-et-Marne department in the Île-de-France region in north-central France.

== See also ==
- Communes of the Seine-et-Marne department
