= Tancrou =

- Commune
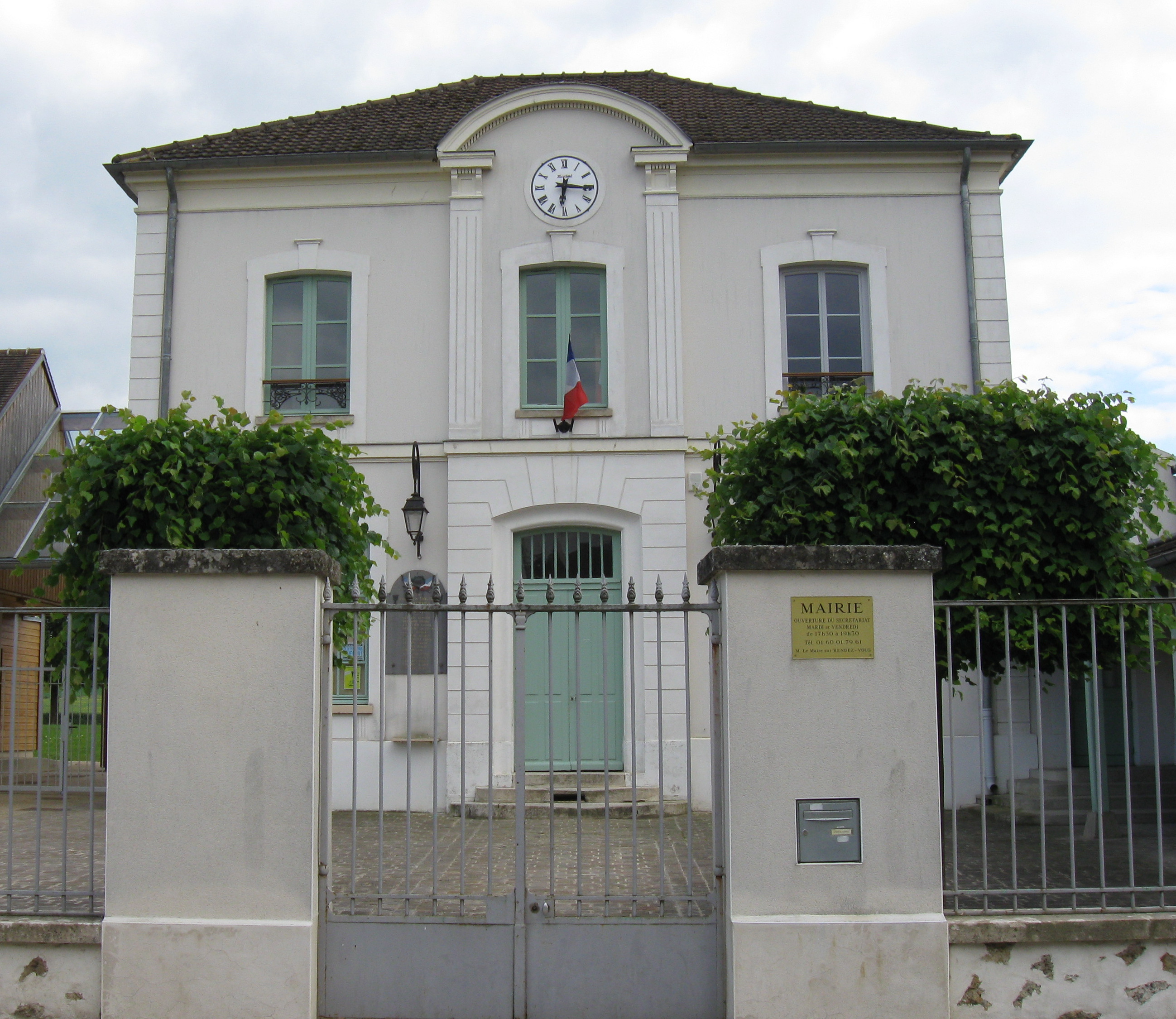
- The town hall in Tancrou
- Location of Tancrou
- Location within France Location within Île-de-France (region)
- Coordinates: 49°00′00″N 3°02′49″E
- Country: France
- Region: Île-de-France
- Department: Seine-et-Marne
- Arrondissement: Meaux
- Canton: La Ferté-sous-Jouarre
- Intercommunality: Pays de l'Ourcq

Government
  - Mayor (2020–2026): Christian Tronche
- Area^{1}: 12.21 km^{2} (4.71 sq mi)
- Highest elevation: 195 m (640 ft)
- Lowest elevation: 48 m (157 ft)
- Population (2023): 340
  - Density: 28/km^{2} (72/sq mi)
- Time zone: UTC+01:00 (CET)
  - Summer (DST): UTC+02:00 (CEST)
- INSEE/Postal code: 77460 /77440
- ^{1} French Land Register data, which excludes lakes, ponds, glaciers > 1 km^{2} (0.386 sq mi or 247 acres) and river estuaries.

Tancrou (French pronunciation: [tɑ̃kʁu]) is a commune in the Seine-et-Marne département in the Île-de-France region in north-central France.

== Demographics ==
Inhabitants of Tancrou are called Tancrétiens.

== See also ==
- Communes of the Seine-et-Marne department
