= Cocherel =

- Commune
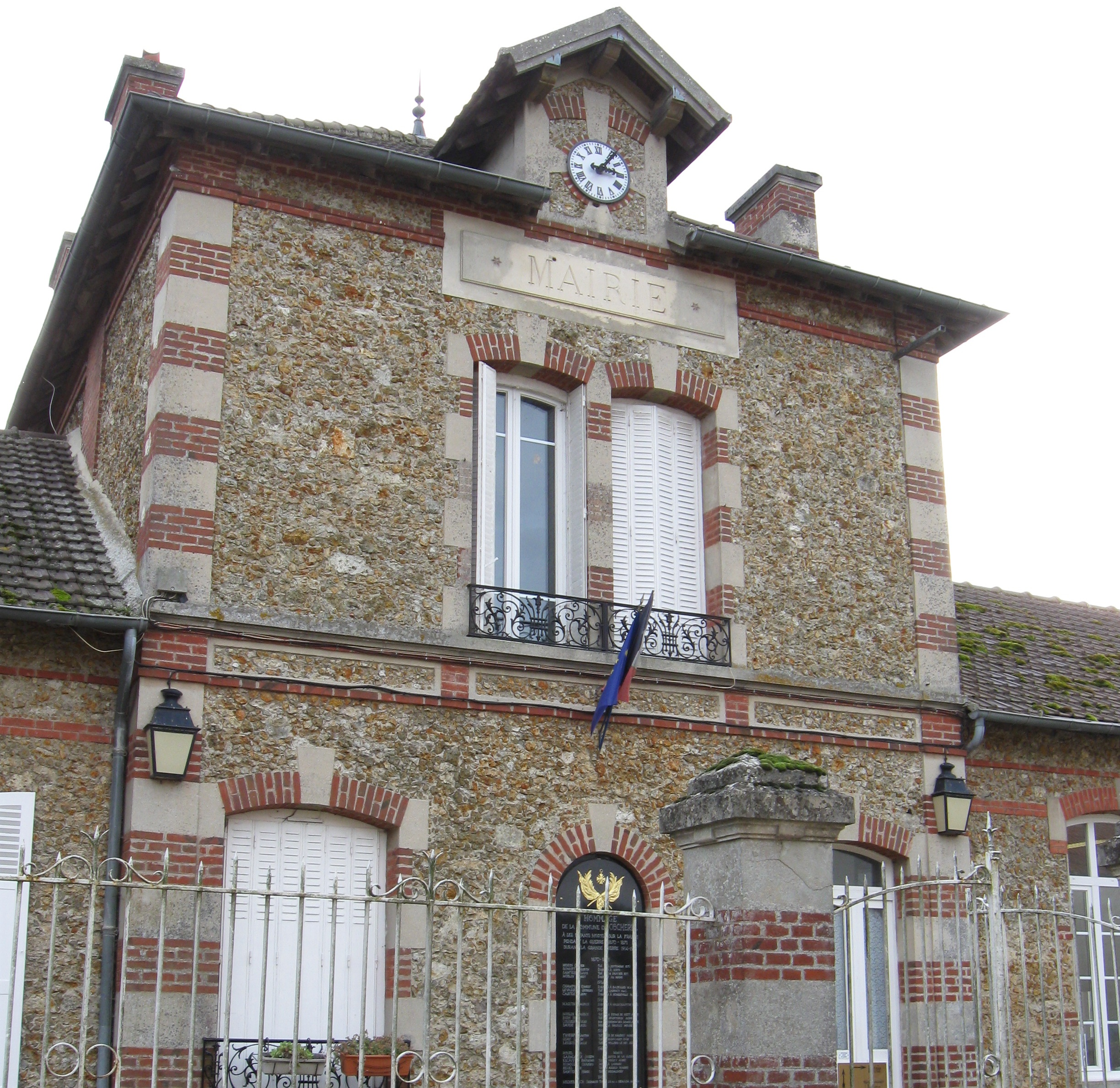
- The town hall in Cocherel
- Location of Cocherel
- Location within France Location within Île-de-France (region)
- Coordinates: 49°01′16″N 3°06′07″E
- Country: France
- Region: Île-de-France
- Department: Seine-et-Marne
- Arrondissement: Meaux
- Canton: La Ferté-sous-Jouarre
- Intercommunality: CC Pays de l'Ourcq

Government
  - Mayor (2020–2026): Pierre Eelbode
- Area^{1}: 8.27 km^{2} (3.19 sq mi)
- Highest elevation: 209 m (686 ft)
- Lowest elevation: 97 m (318 ft)
- Population (2023): 618
  - Density: 74.7/km^{2} (194/sq mi)
- Time zone: UTC+01:00 (CET)
  - Summer (DST): UTC+02:00 (CEST)
- INSEE/Postal code: 77120 /77440
- ^{1} French Land Register data, which excludes lakes, ponds, glaciers > 1 km^{2} (0.386 sq mi or 247 acres) and river estuaries.

Cocherel (French pronunciation: [kɔʃʁɛl]) is a commune in the Seine-et-Marne department in the Île-de-France region in north-central France.

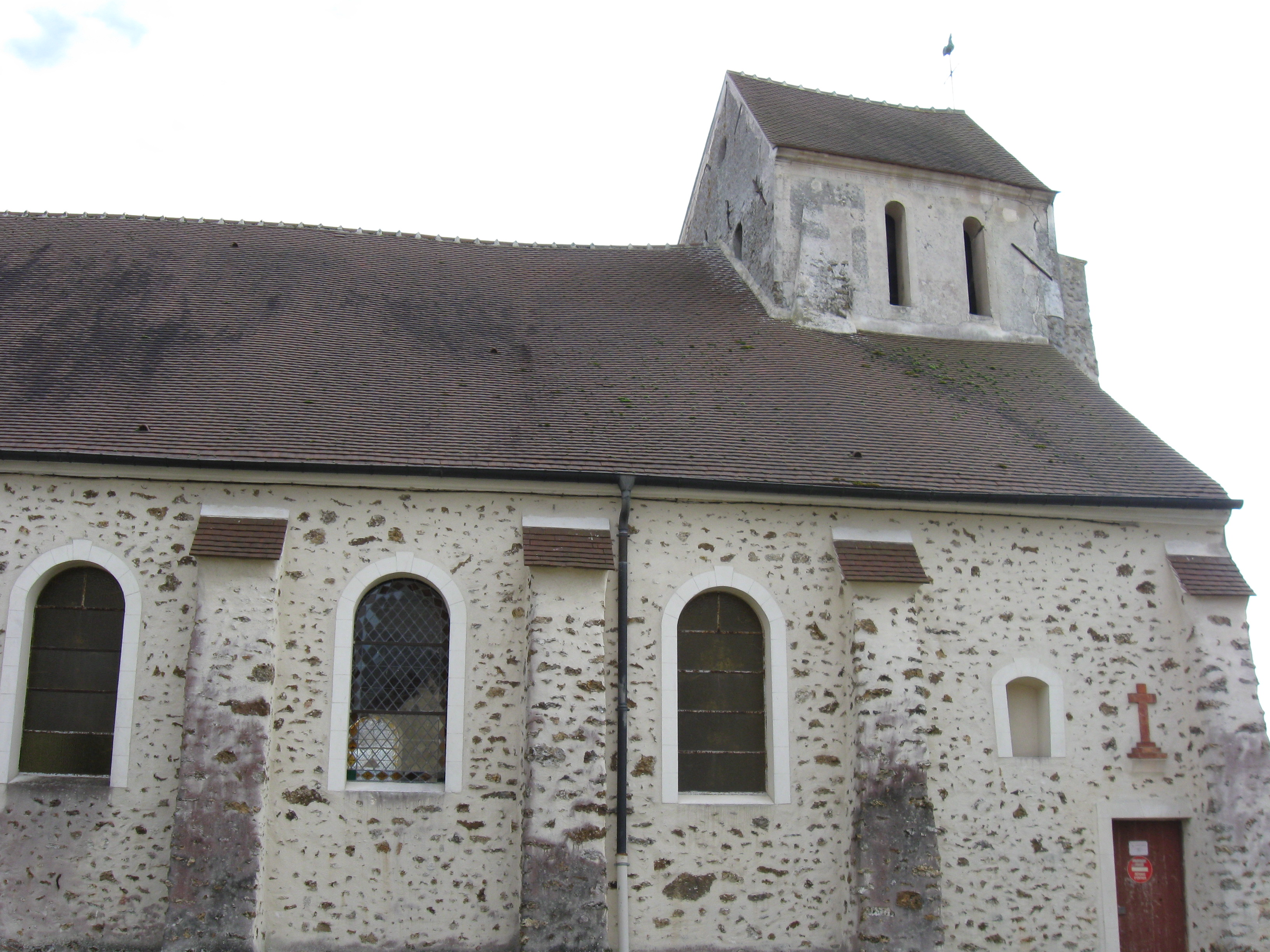
The Church of St. Christopher and St. James the Greater

== History ==
Cocherel and Crépoil (Cocherellium, Crispolium) formed two distinct parishes before 1790 and until 1842 two distinct communes. A royal ordinance of 11 December 1887 united them in a single unit, the chief place of which was fixed at Cocherel.

== Geography ==
Cocherel is at an altitude that reaches 209 meters near the wood of Montjay. It is, after Saint-Georges, of the commune of Verdot, the highest point of the department of Seine-et-Marne; there is no super-permanent watercourse, but only rivers (la Vanche, Méranne, Plants), which roll rain-water and lead them to the Ourcq river.

== See also ==
- Communes of the Seine-et-Marne department
