= Jaignes =

- Commune
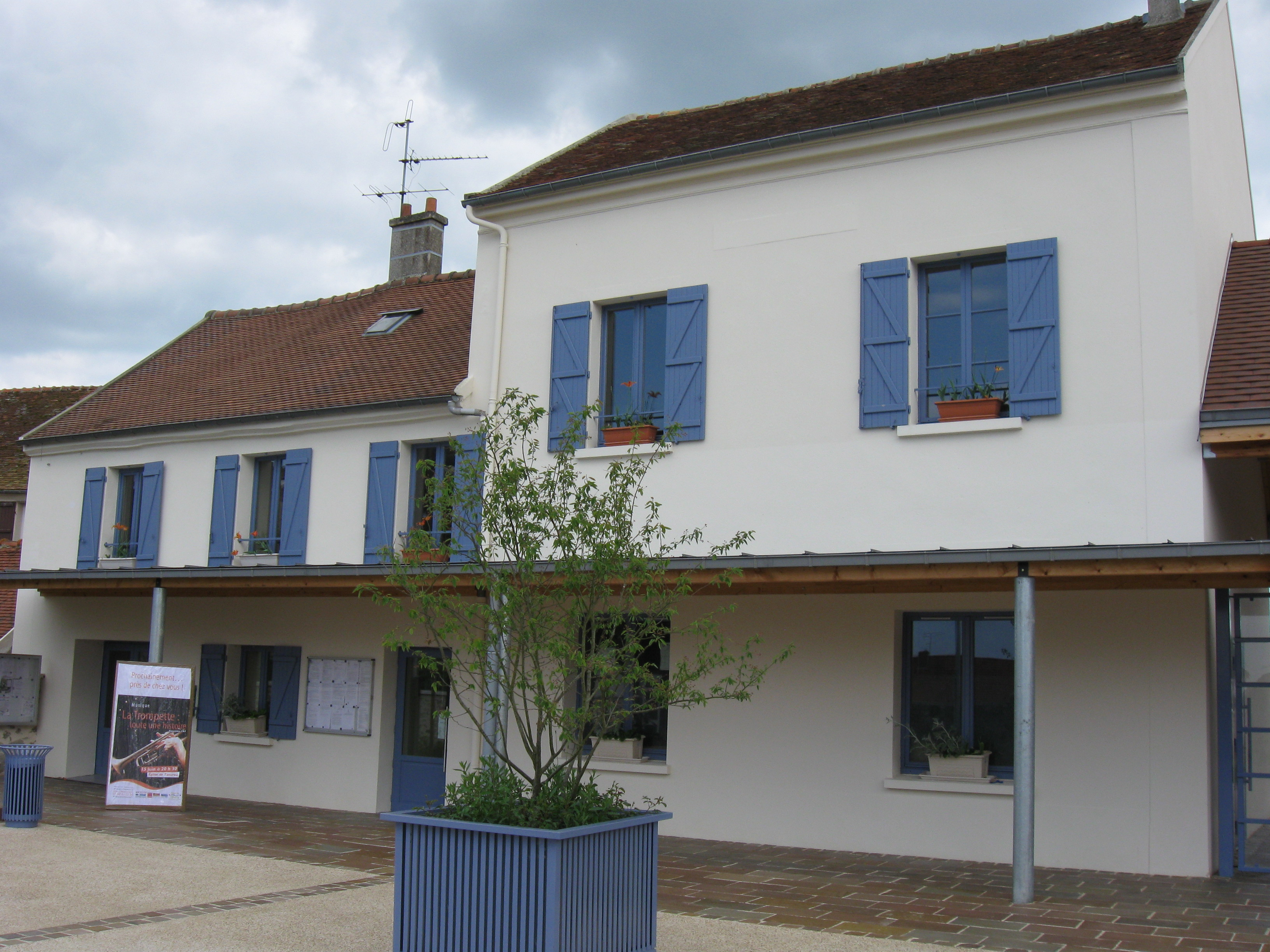
- The town hall in Jaignes
- Location of Jaignes
- Location within France Location within Île-de-France (region)
- Coordinates: 48°59′33″N 3°03′07″E
- Country: France
- Region: Île-de-France
- Department: Seine-et-Marne
- Arrondissement: Meaux
- Canton: La Ferté-sous-Jouarre
- Intercommunality: Pays de l'Ourcq

Government
  - Mayor (2020–2026): Achille Hourdé
- Area^{1}: 10.11 km^{2} (3.90 sq mi)
- Highest elevation: 177 m (581 ft)
- Lowest elevation: 47 m (154 ft)
- Population (2023): 322
  - Density: 31.8/km^{2} (82.5/sq mi)
- Time zone: UTC+01:00 (CET)
  - Summer (DST): UTC+02:00 (CEST)
- INSEE/Postal code: 77235 /77440
- ^{1} French Land Register data, which excludes lakes, ponds, glaciers > 1 km^{2} (0.386 sq mi or 247 acres) and river estuaries.

Jaignes (French pronunciation: [ʒɛɲ]) is a commune in the Seine-et-Marne département in the Île-de-France region in north-central France.

== Population ==
Inhabitants are called Jaignaciens in French.

Historical population
Year	Pop.	±% p.a.
1968	161	—
1975	165	+0.35%
1982	234	+5.12%
1990	289	+2.67%
1999	310	+0.78%
2007	329	+0.75%
2012	276	−3.45%
2017	308	+2.22%
2023	322	+0.74%
Source: INSEE

== See also ==
- Communes of the Seine-et-Marne department
