= Élie-Abel Carrière =

French botanist

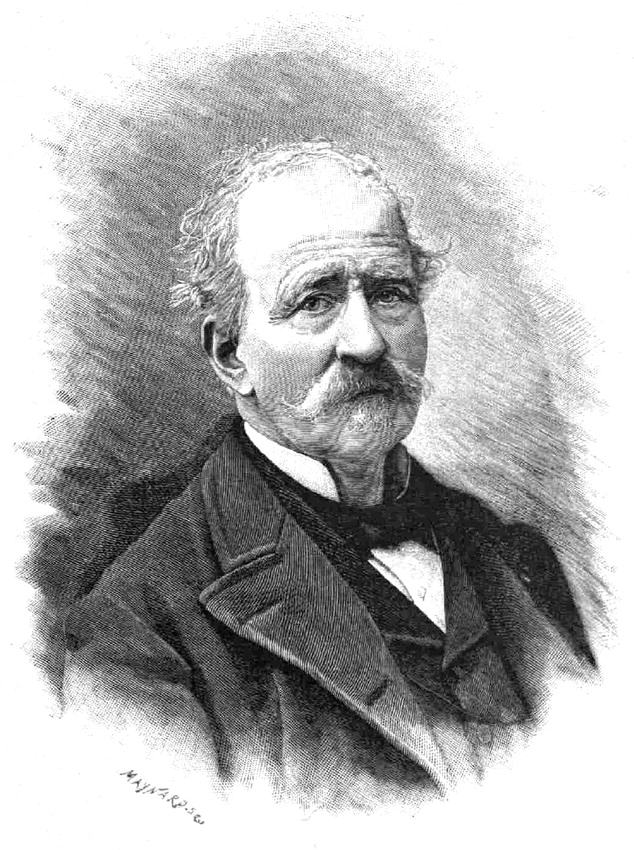
- Born: 4 June 1818; May-en-Multien, France
- Died: 17 August 1896 (aged 78); Paris
- Known for: Traité Général des Conifères (1855)
- Scientific career
- Fields: Botany
- Author abbrev. (botany): Carrière

Élie-Abel Carrière (4 June 1818 – 17 August 1896) was a French botanist, based in Paris. He was a leading authority on conifers in the period 1850–1870, describing many new species, and the new genera Tsuga, Keteleeria and Pseudotsuga. His most important work was the Traité Général des Conifères, published in 1855, with a second, extensively revised edition in 1867.

There is a brief biography of Carrière, in English, in the journal Brittonia.

In addition to his studies of conifers, he published a number of works in the field of horticulture:

- Guide pratique du jardinier multiplicateur: ou art de propager les végétaux par semis, boutures, greffes, etc. (1856)-- book on propagation of plants by seeds, cuttings, grafts.
- Flore des jardins de l'Europe: manuel général des plantes, arbres et arbustes, comprenant leur origine, description, culture : leur application aux jardins d'agrément, à l'agriculture, aux forêts, aux usages domestiques, aux arts et à l'industrie. Et classés selon la méthode de Decandolle par Jacques et Hérincq, (Flora of the gardens of Europe: general handbook of plants, trees and shrubs, including their origin, description, culture: their application to ornamental gardens, to agriculture, forests, domestic, arts and industry. And classified according to the method by Augustin Pyramus de Candolle with Henri Antoine Jacques and François Hérincq) / Paris: Librairie agricole de la Maison rustique, (1857)
- Entretiens familiers sur l'horticulture (1860)
- Encyclopédie horticole (1862) -- Horticulture encyclopedia
- Production et fixation des variétés dans les végétaux (1865)
- Origine des plantes domestiques démontrée par la culture du radis sauvage (1869) -- Origin of domesticated plants demonstrated by culture of wild radish.
- Semis et mise à fruit des arbres fruitiers (1881).

In 1880, he described Iris orchioides.
