= Marcilly, Seine-et-Marne =

Marcilly
- Commune
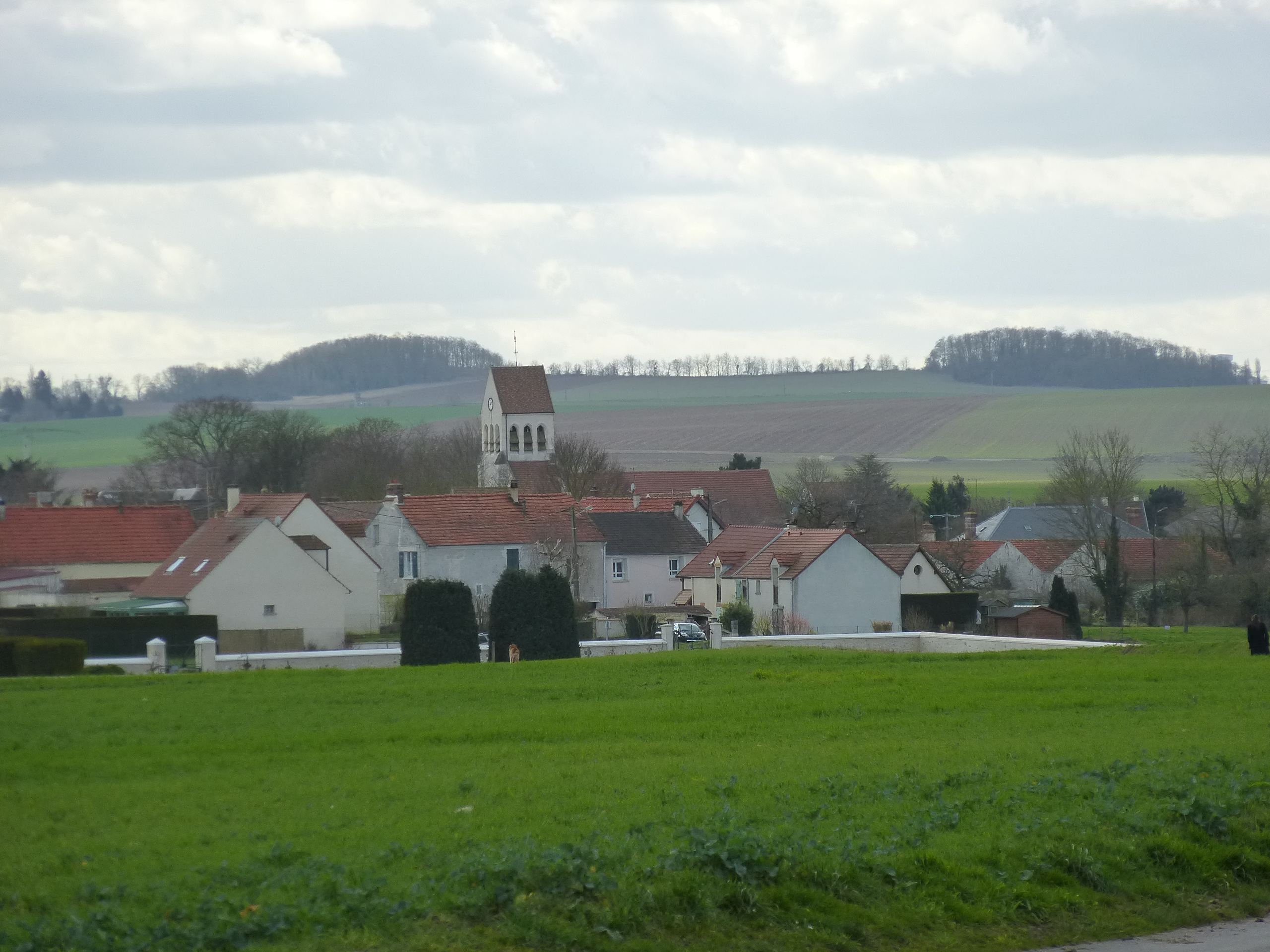
- A general view of Marcilly
- Location of Marcilly
- Location within France Location within Île-de-France (region)
- Coordinates: 49°02′16″N 2°52′42″E
- Country: France
- Region: Île-de-France
- Department: Seine-et-Marne
- Arrondissement: Meaux
- Canton: La Ferté-sous-Jouarre
- Intercommunality: Pays de l'Ourcq

Government
  - Mayor (2020–2026): Dominique Duchesne
- Area^{1}: 6.93 km^{2} (2.68 sq mi)
- Highest elevation: 126 m (413 ft)
- Lowest elevation: 72 m (236 ft)
- Population (2023): 489
  - Density: 70.6/km^{2} (183/sq mi)
- Time zone: UTC+01:00 (CET)
  - Summer (DST): UTC+02:00 (CEST)
- INSEE/Postal code: 77274 /77139
- ^{1} French Land Register data, which excludes lakes, ponds, glaciers > 1 km^{2} (0.386 sq mi or 247 acres) and river estuaries.

Marcilly (French pronunciation: [maʁsiji]) is a commune in the Seine-et-Marne department in the Île-de-France region in north-central France.

== Demographics ==
Inhabitants are called Marcilliens.

== See also ==
- Communes of the Seine-et-Marne department
