= Puisieux, Seine-et-Marne =

Puisieux
- Commune
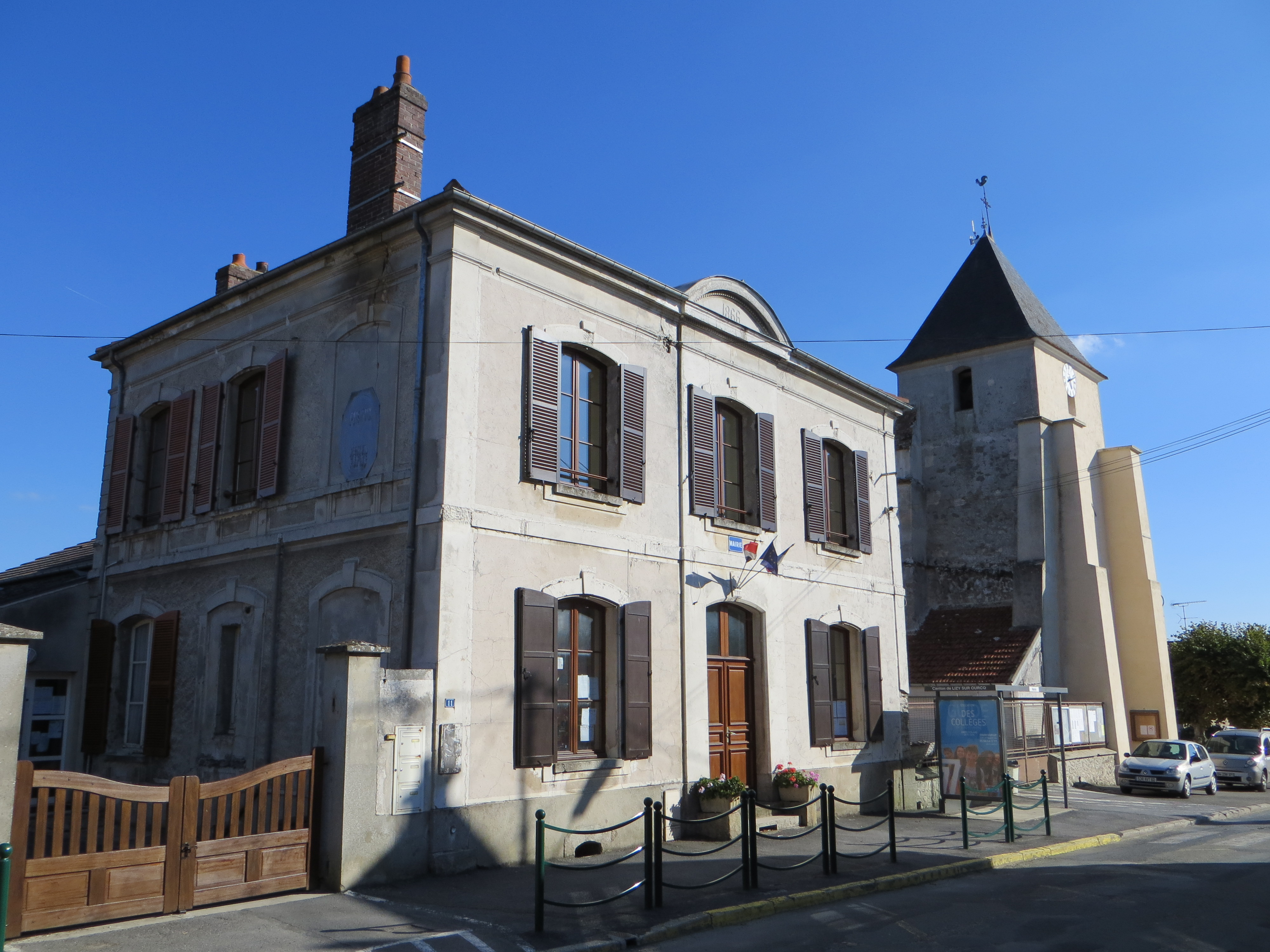
- The town hall and church in Puisieux

- Coat of arms
- Location of Puisieux
- Location within France Location within Île-de-France (region)
- Coordinates: 49°04′00″N 2°54′58″E
- Country: France
- Region: Île-de-France
- Department: Seine-et-Marne
- Arrondissement: Meaux
- Canton: La Ferté-sous-Jouarre
- Intercommunality: Pays de l'Ourcq

Government
  - Mayor (2020–2026): Jérôme Garnier
- Area^{1}: 9.21 km^{2} (3.56 sq mi)
- Highest elevation: 133 m (436 ft)
- Lowest elevation: 70 m (230 ft)
- Population (2023): 317
  - Density: 34.4/km^{2} (89.1/sq mi)
- Time zone: UTC+01:00 (CET)
  - Summer (DST): UTC+02:00 (CEST)
- INSEE/Postal code: 77380 /77139
- ^{1} French Land Register data, which excludes lakes, ponds, glaciers > 1 km^{2} (0.386 sq mi or 247 acres) and river estuaries.

Puisieux (French pronunciation: [pɥizjø]) is a commune in the Seine-et-Marne department in the Île-de-France region in north-central France.

== Demographics ==
The inhabitants are called Puisotains.

== See also ==
- Communes of the Seine-et-Marne department
