= Lizy-sur-Ourcq =

- Commune
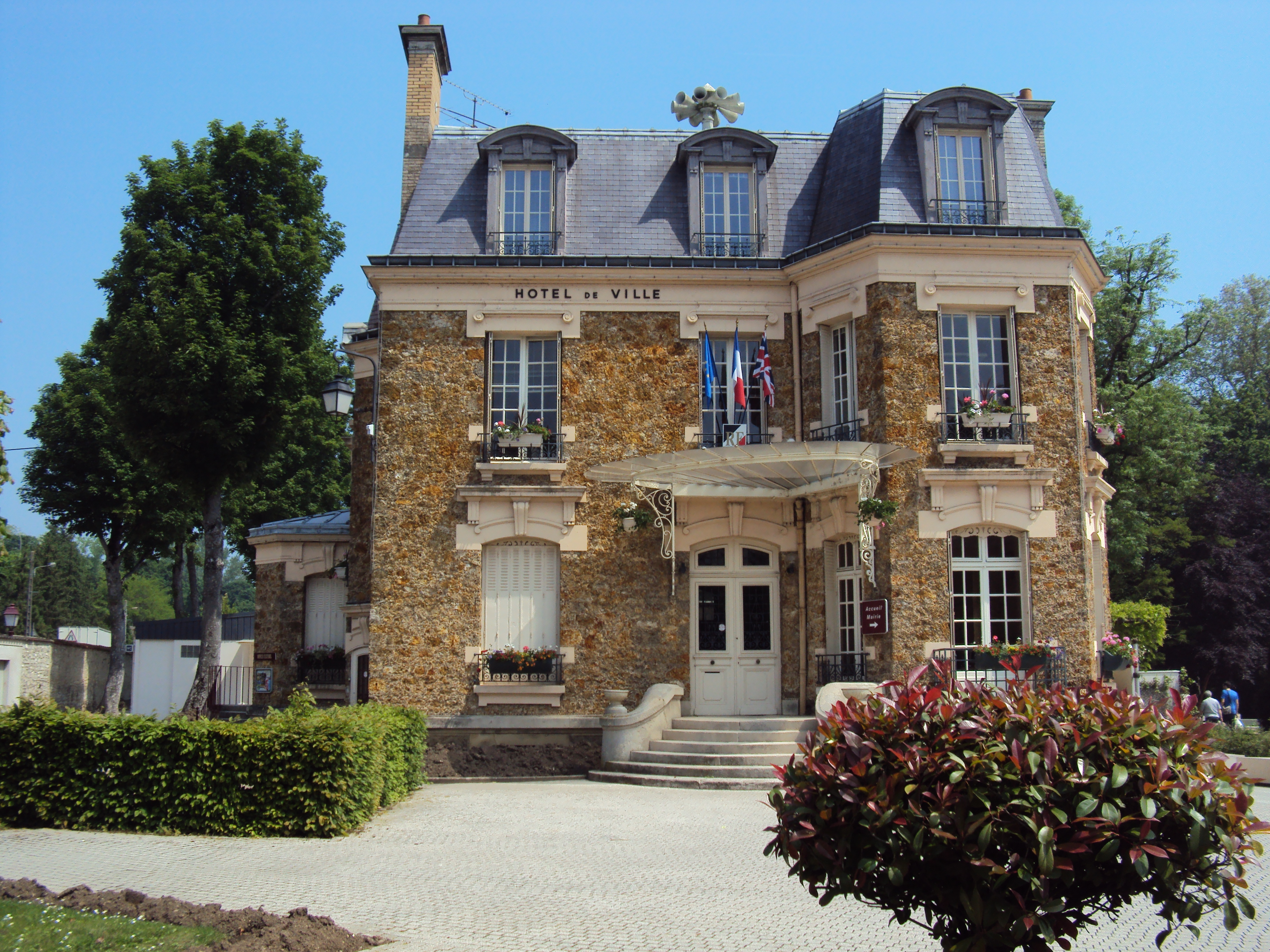
- Town hall of Lizy-sur-Ourcq

- Coat of arms
- Location of Lizy-sur-Ourcq
- Location within France Location within Île-de-France (region)
- Coordinates: 49°01′33″N 3°01′22″E
- Country: France
- Region: Île-de-France
- Department: Seine-et-Marne
- Arrondissement: Meaux
- Canton: La Ferté-sous-Jouarre
- Intercommunality: Pays de l'Ourcq

Government
  - Mayor (2021–2026): Maxence Gille
- Area^{1}: 11.16 km^{2} (4.31 sq mi)
- Highest elevation: 136 m (446 ft)
- Lowest elevation: 45 m (148 ft)
- Population (2023): 3,627
  - Density: 325.0/km^{2} (841.7/sq mi)
- Time zone: UTC+01:00 (CET)
  - Summer (DST): UTC+02:00 (CEST)
- INSEE/Postal code: 77257 /77440
- ^{1} French Land Register data, which excludes lakes, ponds, glaciers > 1 km^{2} (0.386 sq mi or 247 acres) and river estuaries.

Lizy-sur-Ourcq (French pronunciation: [lizi syʁ uʁk], literally Lizy on Ourcq) is a commune in the Seine-et-Marne department in the Île-de-France region in north-central France.

== Population ==
Historical population
Year	Pop.	±% p.a.
1968	2,386	—
1975	2,695	+1.75%
1982	2,891	+1.01%
1990	3,047	+0.66%
1999	3,377	+1.15%
2007	3,449	+0.26%
2012	3,617	+0.96%
2017	3,566	−0.28%
2023	3,627	+0.28%
Source: INSEE

Inhabitants are called Lizéens in French.

== Localisation ==
Lizy-sur-Ourcq is located at 16 km in the North-East of Meaux and at 60 km in the North-East of Paris.

== International relations ==
Lizy-sur-Ourcq is twinned with:

- Burwell, United Kingdom

== Education ==
Schools include:

- École maternelle Bellevue - Preschool
- École Saint Albert - Preschool and elementary school
- École Henri Des - Lower elementary school
- École Claude Monet - Upper elementary school
- Collège Camille Saint-Saëns - Junior high school

== See also ==
- Communes of the Seine-et-Marne department
