= Communes of the Seine-et-Marne department =

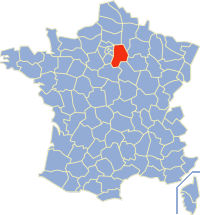

The following is a list of the 507 communes of the Seine-et-Marne department of France.

The communes cooperate in the following intercommunalities (as of 2025):

- Communauté d'agglomération Coulommiers Pays de Brie
- Communauté d'agglomération Grand Paris Sud Seine-Essonne-Sénart (partly)
- Communauté d'agglomération de Marne et Gondoire
- Communauté d'agglomération Melun Val de Seine
- Communauté d'agglomération Paris - Vallée de la Marne
- Communauté d'agglomération du Pays de Fontainebleau
- Communauté d'agglomération du Pays de Meaux
- Communauté d'agglomération Roissy Pays de France (partly)
- Val d'Europe Agglomération
- Communauté de communes de la Bassée - Montois
- Communauté de communes de la Brie des Rivières et Châteaux
- Communauté de communes La Brie Nangissienne
- Communauté de communes des Deux Morin
- Communauté de communes Gâtinais-Val de Loing
- Communauté de communes Moret Seine et Loing
- Communauté de communes de l'Orée de la Brie (partly)
- Communauté de communes du Pays de l'Ourcq
- Communauté de communes du Pays de Montereau
- Communauté de communes Pays de Nemours
- Communauté de communes Plaines et Monts de France
- Communauté de communes Les Portes Briardes Entre Villes et Forêts
- Communauté de communes du Provinois
- Communauté de communes du Val Briard

| INSEE code | Postal code | Commune |
|---|---|---|
| 77001 | 77760 | Achères-la-Forêt |
| 77002 | 77120 | Amillis |
| 77003 | 77760 | Amponville |
| 77004 | 77390 | Andrezel |
| 77005 | 77410 | Annet-sur-Marne |
| 77006 | 77630 | Arbonne-la-Forêt |
| 77007 | 77390 | Argentières |
| 77008 | 77440 | Armentières-en-Brie |
| 77009 | 77890 | Arville |
| 77010 | 77720 | Aubepierre-Ozouer-le-Repos |
| 77011 | 77570 | Aufferville |
| 77012 | 77560 | Augers-en-Brie |
| 77013 | 77120 | Aulnoy |
| 77014 | 77210 | Avon |
| 77015 | 77480 | Baby |
| 77016 | 77167 | Bagneaux-sur-Loing |
| 77018 | 77700 | Bailly-Romainvilliers |
| 77019 | 77118 | Balloy |
| 77020 | 77970 | Bannost-Villegagnon |
| 77021 | 77130 | Barbey |
| 77022 | 77630 | Barbizon |
| 77023 | 77910 | Barcy |
| 77024 | 77750 | Bassevelle |
| 77025 | 77118 | Bazoches-lès-Bray |
| 77026 | 77560 | Beauchery-Saint-Martin |
| 77027 | 77890 | Beaumont-du-Gâtinais |
| 77433 | 77120 | Beautheil-Saints |
| 77029 | 77390 | Beauvoir |
| 77030 | 77510 | Bellot |
| 77031 | 77540 | Bernay-Vilbert |
| 77032 | 77320 | Beton-Bazoches |
| 77033 | 77970 | Bezalles |
| 77034 | 77115 | Blandy |
| 77035 | 77940 | Blennes |
| 77036 | 77970 | Boisdon |
| 77037 | 77590 | Bois-le-Roi |
| 77038 | 77350 | Boissettes |
| 77039 | 77350 | Boissise-la-Bertrand |
| 77040 | 77310 | Boissise-le-Roi |
| 77041 | 77760 | Boissy-aux-Cailles |
| 77042 | 77169 | Boissy-le-Châtel |
| 77043 | 77750 | Boitron |
| 77044 | 77720 | Bombon |
| 77045 | 77570 | Bougligny |
| 77046 | 77760 | Boulancourt |
| 77047 | 77580 | Bouleurs |
| 77048 | 77780 | Bourron-Marlotte |
| 77049 | 77470 | Boutigny |
| 77050 | 77620 | Bransles |
| 77051 | 77480 | Bray-sur-Seine |
| 77052 | 77720 | Bréau |
| 77053 | 77170 | Brie-Comte-Robert |
| 77054 | 77940 | La Brosse-Montceaux |
| 77055 | 77177 | Brou-sur-Chantereine |
| 77056 | 77890 | Burcy |
| 77057 | 77750 | Bussières |
| 77058 | 77600 | Bussy-Saint-Georges |
| 77059 | 77600 | Bussy-Saint-Martin |
| 77060 | 77760 | Buthiers |
| 77061 | 77130 | Cannes-Écluse |
| 77062 | 77400 | Carnetin |
| 77063 | 77515 | La Celle-sur-Morin |
| 77065 | 77930 | Cély |
| 77066 | 77320 | Cerneux |
| 77067 | 77240 | Cesson |
| 77068 | 77520 | Cessoy-en-Montois |
| 77069 | 77930 | Chailly-en-Bière |
| 77070 | 77120 | Chailly-en-Brie |
| 77071 | 77460 | Chaintreaux |
| 77072 | 77171 | Chalautre-la-Grande |
| 77073 | 77160 | Chalautre-la-Petite |
| 77075 | 77144 | Chalifert |
| 77076 | 77650 | Chalmaison |
| 77077 | 77910 | Chambry |
| 77078 | 77260 | Chamigny |
| 77079 | 77430 | Champagne-sur-Seine |
| 77080 | 77560 | Champcenest |
| 77081 | 77390 | Champdeuil |
| 77082 | 77720 | Champeaux |
| 77083 | 77420 | Champs-sur-Marne |
| 77084 | 77660 | Changis-sur-Marne |
| 77085 | 77600 | Chanteloup-en-Brie |
| 77086 | 77720 | La Chapelle-Gauthier |
| 77087 | 77540 | La Chapelle-Iger |
| 77088 | 77760 | La Chapelle-la-Reine |
| 77093 | 77320 | La Chapelle-Moutils |
| 77089 | 77370 | La Chapelle-Rablais |
| 77090 | 77160 | La Chapelle-Saint-Sulpice |
| 77091 | 77610 | Les Chapelles-Bourbon |
| 77094 | 77410 | Charmentray |
| 77095 | 77410 | Charny |
| 77096 | 77590 | Chartrettes |
| 77097 | 77320 | Chartronges |
| 77098 | 77370 | Châteaubleau |
| 77099 | 77570 | Château-Landon |
| 77100 | 77820 | Le Châtelet-en-Brie |
| 77101 | 77126 | Châtenay-sur-Seine |
| 77102 | 77167 | Châtenoy |
| 77103 | 77820 | Châtillon-la-Borde |
| 77104 | 77610 | Châtres |
| 77335 | 77124 | Chauconin-Neufmontiers |
| 77106 | 77169 | Chauffry |
| 77107 | 77390 | Chaumes-en-Brie |
| 77108 | 77500 | Chelles |
| 77109 | 77160 | Chenoise-Cucharmoy |
| 77110 | 77570 | Chenou |
| 77111 | 77700 | Chessy |
| 77112 | 77760 | Chevrainvilliers |
| 77113 | 77320 | Chevru |
| 77114 | 77173 | Chevry-Cossigny |
| 77115 | 77710 | Chevry-en-Sereine |
| 77116 | 77320 | Choisy-en-Brie |
| 77117 | 77730 | Citry |
| 77118 | 77410 | Claye-Souilly |
| 77119 | 77370 | Clos-Fontaine |
| 77120 | 77440 | Cocherel |
| 77121 | 77090 | Collégien |
| 77122 | 77380 | Combs-la-Ville |
| 77123 | 77290 | Compans |
| 77124 | 77600 | Conches-sur-Gondoire |
| 77125 | 77450 | Condé-Sainte-Libiaire |
| 77126 | 77440 | Congis-sur-Thérouanne |
| 77127 | 77170 | Coubert |
| 77128 | 77860 | Couilly-Pont-aux-Dames |
| 77129 | 77840 | Coulombs-en-Valois |
| 77130 | 77580 | Coulommes |
| 77131 | 77120 | Coulommiers |
| 77132 | 77700 | Coupvray |
| 77133 | 77126 | Courcelles-en-Bassée |
| 77134 | 77560 | Courchamp |
| 77135 | 77540 | Courpalay |
| 77136 | 77390 | Courquetaine |
| 77137 | 77560 | Courtacon |
| 77138 | 77390 | Courtomer |
| 77139 | 77181 | Courtry |
| 77140 | 77154 | Coutençon |
| 77141 | 77580 | Coutevroult |
| 77142 | 77580 | Crécy-la-Chapelle |
| 77143 | 77124 | Crégy-lès-Meaux |
| 77144 | 77610 | Crèvecœur-en-Brie |
| 77145 | 77390 | Crisenoy |
| 77146 | 77183 | Croissy-Beaubourg |
| 77147 | 77370 | La Croix-en-Brie |
| 77148 | 77840 | Crouy-sur-Ourcq |
| 77150 | 77165 | Cuisy |
| 77151 | 77320 | Dagny |
| 77152 | 77190 | Dammarie-lès-Lys |
| 77153 | 77230 | Dammartin-en-Goële |
| 77154 | 77163 | Dammartin-sur-Tigeaux |
| 77155 | 77400 | Dampmart |
| 77156 | 77140 | Darvault |
| 77157 | 77440 | Dhuisy |
| 77158 | 77940 | Diant |
| 77159 | 77520 | Donnemarie-Dontilly |
| 77161 | 77130 | Dormelles |
| 77162 | 77510 | Doue |
| 77163 | 77139 | Douy-la-Ramée |
| 77164 | 77830 | Échouboulains |
| 77165 | 77820 | Les Écrennes |
| 77167 | 77126 | Égligny |
| 77168 | 77620 | Égreville |
| 77169 | 77184 | Émerainville |
| 77171 | 77450 | Esbly |
| 77172 | 77940 | Esmans |
| 77173 | 77139 | Étrépilly |
| 77174 | 77157 | Everly |
| 77175 | 77166 | Évry-Grégy-sur-Yerre |
| 77176 | 77515 | Faremoutiers |
| 77177 | 77220 | Favières |
| 77178 | 77167 | Faÿ-lès-Nemours |
| 77179 | 77133 | Féricy |
| 77180 | 77150 | Férolles-Attilly |
| 77181 | 77164 | Ferrières-en-Brie |
| 77182 | 77320 | La Ferté-Gaucher |
| 77183 | 77260 | La Ferté-sous-Jouarre |
| 77184 | 77940 | Flagy |
| 77185 | 77930 | Fleury-en-Bière |
| 77186 | 77300 | Fontainebleau |
| 77187 | 77480 | Fontaine-Fourches |
| 77188 | 77590 | Fontaine-le-Port |
| 77190 | 77370 | Fontains |
| 77191 | 77370 | Fontenailles |
| 77192 | 77610 | Fontenay-Trésigny |
| 77193 | 77165 | Forfry |
| 77194 | 77130 | Forges |
| 77195 | 77390 | Fouju |
| 77196 | 77410 | Fresnes-sur-Marne |
| 77197 | 77320 | Frétoy |
| 77198 | 77760 | Fromont |
| 77199 | 77470 | Fublaines |
| 77200 | 77890 | Garentreville |
| 77201 | 77370 | Gastins |
| 77202 | 77690 | La Genevraye |
| 77203 | 77910 | Germigny-l'Évêque |
| 77204 | 77840 | Germigny-sous-Coulombs |
| 77205 | 77165 | Gesvres-le-Chapitre |
| 77206 | 77120 | Giremoutiers |
| 77207 | 77890 | Gironville |
| 77208 | 77114 | Gouaix |
| 77209 | 77400 | Gouvernes |
| 77210 | 77130 | La Grande-Paroisse |
| 77211 | 77720 | Grandpuits-Bailly-Carrois |
| 77212 | 77118 | Gravon |
| 77214 | 77410 | Gressy |
| 77215 | 77220 | Gretz-Armainvilliers |
| 77216 | 77880 | Grez-sur-Loing |
| 77217 | 77166 | Grisy-Suisnes |
| 77218 | 77480 | Grisy-sur-Seine |
| 77219 | 77580 | Guérard |
| 77220 | 77760 | Guercheville |
| 77221 | 77600 | Guermantes |
| 77222 | 77390 | Guignes |
| 77223 | 77520 | Gurcy-le-Châtel |
| 77224 | 77515 | Hautefeuille |
| 77225 | 77580 | La Haute-Maison |
| 77226 | 77850 | Héricy |
| 77227 | 77114 | Hermé |
| 77228 | 77510 | Hondevilliers |
| 77229 | 77610 | La Houssaye-en-Brie |
| 77230 | 77890 | Ichy |
| 77231 | 77440 | Isles-les-Meldeuses |
| 77232 | 77450 | Isles-lès-Villenoy |
| 77233 | 77165 | Iverny |
| 77234 | 77450 | Jablines |
| 77235 | 77440 | Jaignes |
| 77236 | 77480 | Jaulnes |
| 77237 | 77600 | Jossigny |
| 77238 | 77640 | Jouarre |
| 77239 | 77970 | Jouy-le-Châtel |
| 77240 | 77320 | Jouy-sur-Morin |
| 77241 | 77230 | Juilly |
| 77242 | 77650 | Jutigny |
| 77243 | 77400 | Lagny-sur-Marne |
| 77244 | 77760 | Larchant |
| 77245 | 77148 | Laval-en-Brie |
| 77246 | 77171 | Léchelle |
| 77247 | 77320 | Lescherolles |
| 77248 | 77450 | Lesches |
| 77249 | 77150 | Lésigny |
| 77250 | 77320 | Leudon-en-Brie |
| 77251 | 77127 | Lieusaint |
| 77252 | 77550 | Limoges-Fourches |
| 77253 | 77550 | Lissy |
| 77254 | 77220 | Liverdy-en-Brie |
| 77255 | 77000 | Livry-sur-Seine |
| 77256 | 77650 | Lizines |
| 77257 | 77440 | Lizy-sur-Ourcq |
| 77258 | 77185 | Lognes |
| 77259 | 77230 | Longperrier |
| 77260 | 77650 | Longueville |
| 77261 | 77710 | Lorrez-le-Bocage-Préaux |
| 77262 | 77560 | Louan-Villegruis-Fontaine |
| 77263 | 77520 | Luisetaines |
| 77264 | 77540 | Lumigny-Nesles-Ormeaux |

| INSEE code | Postal code | Commune |
|---|---|---|
| 77265 | 77138 | Luzancy |
| 77266 | 77133 | Machault |
| 77267 | 77570 | La Madeleine-sur-Loing |
| 77268 | 77700 | Magny-le-Hongre |
| 77269 | 77950 | Maincy |
| 77270 | 77580 | Maisoncelles-en-Brie |
| 77271 | 77570 | Maisoncelles-en-Gâtinais |
| 77272 | 77370 | Maison-Rouge |
| 77273 | 77230 | Marchémoret |
| 77274 | 77139 | Marcilly |
| 77275 | 77560 | Les Marêts |
| 77276 | 77100 | Mareuil-lès-Meaux |
| 77277 | 77610 | Marles-en-Brie |
| 77278 | 77120 | Marolles-en-Brie |
| 77279 | 77130 | Marolles-sur-Seine |
| 77280 | 77440 | Mary-sur-Marne |
| 77281 | 77120 | Mauperthuis |
| 77282 | 77990 | Mauregard |
| 77283 | 77145 | May-en-Multien |
| 77284 | 77100 | Meaux |
| 77285 | 77350 | Le Mée-sur-Seine |
| 77286 | 77520 | Meigneux |
| 77287 | 77320 | Meilleray |
| 77288 | 77000 | Melun |
| 77289 | 77171 | Melz-sur-Seine |
| 77290 | 77730 | Méry-sur-Marne |
| 77291 | 77990 | Le Mesnil-Amelot |
| 77292 | 77410 | Messy |
| 77293 | 77130 | Misy-sur-Yonne |
| 77294 | 77290 | Mitry-Mory |
| 77295 | 77950 | Moisenay |
| 77296 | 77550 | Moissy-Cramayel |
| 77302 | 77140 | Moncourt-Fromonville |
| 77297 | 77570 | Mondreville |
| 77298 | 77520 | Mons-en-Montois |
| 77300 | 77470 | Montceaux-lès-Meaux |
| 77301 | 77151 | Montceaux-lès-Provins |
| 77303 | 77320 | Montdauphin |
| 77304 | 77320 | Montenils |
| 77305 | 77130 | Montereau-Fault-Yonne |
| 77306 | 77950 | Montereau-sur-le-Jard |
| 77307 | 77144 | Montévrain |
| 77308 | 77230 | Montgé-en-Goële |
| 77309 | 77122 | Monthyon |
| 77310 | 77480 | Montigny-le-Guesdier |
| 77311 | 77520 | Montigny-Lencoup |
| 77312 | 77690 | Montigny-sur-Loing |
| 77313 | 77940 | Montmachoux |
| 77314 | 77320 | Montolivet |
| 77315 | 77450 | Montry |
| 77316 | 77250 | Moret-Loing-et-Orvanne |
| 77317 | 77720 | Mormant |
| 77318 | 77163 | Mortcerf |
| 77319 | 77160 | Mortery |
| 77320 | 77120 | Mouroux |
| 77321 | 77480 | Mousseaux-lès-Bray |
| 77322 | 77230 | Moussy-le-Neuf |
| 77323 | 77230 | Moussy-le-Vieux |
| 77325 | 77480 | Mouy-sur-Seine |
| 77326 | 77176 | Nandy |
| 77327 | 77370 | Nangis |
| 77328 | 77760 | Nanteau-sur-Essonne |
| 77329 | 77710 | Nanteau-sur-Lunain |
| 77330 | 77100 | Nanteuil-lès-Meaux |
| 77331 | 77730 | Nanteuil-sur-Marne |
| 77332 | 77230 | Nantouillet |
| 77333 | 77140 | Nemours |
| 77336 | 77610 | Neufmoutiers-en-Brie |
| 77337 | 77186 | Noisiel |
| 77338 | 77940 | Noisy-Rudignon |
| 77339 | 77123 | Noisy-sur-École |
| 77340 | 77140 | Nonville |
| 77341 | 77114 | Noyen-sur-Seine |
| 77342 | 77890 | Obsonville |
| 77343 | 77440 | Ocquerre |
| 77344 | 77178 | Oissery |
| 77345 | 77750 | Orly-sur-Morin |
| 77348 | 77167 | Ormesson |
| 77347 | 77134 | Les Ormes-sur-Voulzie |
| 77349 | 77280 | Othis |
| 77350 | 77330 | Ozoir-la-Ferrière |
| 77352 | 77390 | Ozouer-le-Voulgis |
| 77353 | 77710 | Paley |
| 77354 | 77830 | Pamfou |
| 77355 | 77520 | Paroy |
| 77356 | 77480 | Passy-sur-Seine |
| 77357 | 77970 | Pécy |
| 77358 | 77124 | Penchard |
| 77359 | 77930 | Perthes |
| 77360 | 77131 | Pézarches |
| 77361 | 77580 | Pierre-Levée |
| 77363 | 77181 | Le Pin |
| 77364 | 77165 | Le Plessis-aux-Bois |
| 77365 | 77540 | Le Plessis-Feu-Aussoux |
| 77366 | 77165 | Le Plessis-l'Évêque |
| 77367 | 77440 | Le Plessis-Placy |
| 77368 | 77160 | Poigny |
| 77369 | 77470 | Poincy |
| 77370 | 77167 | Poligny |
| 77371 | 77515 | Pommeuse |
| 77372 | 77400 | Pomponne |
| 77373 | 77340 | Pontault-Combault |
| 77374 | 77135 | Pontcarré |
| 77376 | 77410 | Précy-sur-Marne |
| 77377 | 77220 | Presles-en-Brie |
| 77378 | 77310 | Pringy |
| 77379 | 77160 | Provins |
| 77380 | 77139 | Puisieux |
| 77381 | 77720 | Quiers |
| 77382 | 77860 | Quincy-Voisins |
| 77383 | 77370 | Rampillon |
| 77384 | 77550 | Réau |
| 77385 | 77510 | Rebais |
| 77386 | 77760 | Recloses |
| 77387 | 77710 | Remauville |
| 77388 | 77260 | Reuil-en-Brie |
| 77389 | 77000 | La Rochette |
| 77390 | 77680 | Roissy-en-Brie |
| 77391 | 77160 | Rouilly |
| 77392 | 77230 | Rouvres |
| 77393 | 77540 | Rozay-en-Brie |
| 77394 | 77950 | Rubelles |
| 77395 | 77760 | Rumont |
| 77396 | 77560 | Rupéreux |
| 77397 | 77730 | Saâcy-sur-Marne |
| 77398 | 77510 | Sablonnières |
| 77400 | 77515 | Saint-Augustin |
| 77402 | 77320 | Saint-Barthélemy |
| 77403 | 77160 | Saint-Brice |
| 77405 | 77750 | Saint-Cyr-sur-Morin |
| 77406 | 77510 | Saint-Denis-lès-Rebais |
| 77401 | 77260 | Sainte-Aulde |
| 77404 | 77650 | Sainte-Colombe |
| 77407 | 77310 | Saint-Fargeau-Ponthierry |
| 77408 | 77470 | Saint-Fiacre |
| 77409 | 77130 | Saint-Germain-Laval |
| 77410 | 77950 | Saint-Germain-Laxis |
| 77411 | 77169 | Saint-Germain-sous-Doue |
| 77412 | 77930 | Saint-Germain-sur-École |
| 77413 | 77860 | Saint-Germain-sur-Morin |
| 77414 | 77160 | Saint-Hilliers |
| 77415 | 77660 | Saint-Jean-les-Deux-Jumeaux |
| 77416 | 77370 | Saint-Just-en-Brie |
| 77417 | 77510 | Saint-Léger |
| 77418 | 77650 | Saint-Loup-de-Naud |
| 77419 | 77670 | Saint-Mammès |
| 77420 | 77230 | Saint-Mard |
| 77421 | 77320 | Saint-Mars-Vieux-Maisons |
| 77423 | 77320 | Saint-Martin-des-Champs |
| 77424 | 77320 | Saint-Martin-du-Boschet |
| 77425 | 77630 | Saint-Martin-en-Bière |
| 77426 | 77720 | Saint-Méry |
| 77427 | 77410 | Saint-Mesmes |
| 77428 | 77720 | Saint-Ouen-en-Brie |
| 77429 | 77750 | Saint-Ouen-sur-Morin |
| 77430 | 77178 | Saint-Pathus |
| 77431 | 77140 | Saint-Pierre-lès-Nemours |
| 77432 | 77320 | Saint-Rémy-la-Vanne |
| 77434 | 77480 | Saint-Sauveur-lès-Bray |
| 77435 | 77930 | Saint-Sauveur-sur-École |
| 77436 | 77169 | Saint-Siméon |
| 77437 | 77165 | Saint-Soupplets |
| 77438 | 77400 | Saint-Thibault-des-Vignes |
| 77439 | 77148 | Salins |
| 77440 | 77260 | Sammeron |
| 77441 | 77920 | Samois-sur-Seine |
| 77442 | 77210 | Samoreau |
| 77443 | 77580 | Sancy |
| 77444 | 77320 | Sancy-lès-Provins |
| 77445 | 77176 | Savigny-le-Temple |
| 77446 | 77650 | Savins |
| 77447 | 77240 | Seine-Port |
| 77448 | 77260 | Sept-Sorts |
| 77449 | 77700 | Serris |
| 77450 | 77170 | Servon |
| 77451 | 77640 | Signy-Signets |
| 77452 | 77520 | Sigy |
| 77453 | 77115 | Sivry-Courtry |
| 77454 | 77520 | Sognolles-en-Montois |
| 77455 | 77111 | Soignolles-en-Brie |
| 77456 | 77650 | Soisy-Bouy |
| 77457 | 77111 | Solers |
| 77458 | 77460 | Souppes-sur-Loing |
| 77459 | 77171 | Sourdun |
| 77460 | 77440 | Tancrou |
| 77461 | 77520 | Thénisy |
| 77462 | 77230 | Thieux |
| 77463 | 77810 | Thomery |
| 77464 | 77400 | Thorigny-sur-Marne |
| 77465 | 77940 | Thoury-Férottes |
| 77466 | 77163 | Tigeaux |
| 77467 | 77130 | La Tombe |
| 77468 | 77200 | Torcy |
| 77469 | 77131 | Touquin |
| 77470 | 77220 | Tournan-en-Brie |
| 77471 | 77123 | Tousson |
| 77472 | 77510 | La Trétoire |
| 77473 | 77710 | Treuzy-Levelay |
| 77474 | 77450 | Trilbardou |
| 77475 | 77470 | Trilport |
| 77476 | 77440 | Trocy-en-Multien |
| 77477 | 77760 | Ury |
| 77478 | 77260 | Ussy-sur-Marne |
| 77479 | 77360 | Vaires-sur-Marne |
| 77480 | 77830 | Valence-en-Brie |
| 77481 | 77370 | Vanvillé |
| 77482 | 77130 | Varennes-sur-Seine |
| 77483 | 77910 | Varreddes |
| 77484 | 77580 | Vaucourtois |
| 77485 | 77123 | Le Vaudoué |
| 77486 | 77141 | Vaudoy-en-Brie |
| 77487 | 77000 | Vaux-le-Pénil |
| 77489 | 77710 | Vaux-sur-Lunain |
| 77490 | 77440 | Vendrest |
| 77492 | 77510 | Verdelot |
| 77493 | 77390 | Verneuil-l'Étang |
| 77494 | 77670 | Vernou-la-Celle-sur-Seine |
| 77495 | 77240 | Vert-Saint-Denis |
| 77496 | 77370 | Vieux-Champagne |
| 77498 | 77450 | Vignely |
| 77500 | 77710 | Villebéon |
| 77501 | 77250 | Villecerf |
| 77504 | 77710 | Villemaréchal |
| 77505 | 77470 | Villemareuil |
| 77506 | 77250 | Villemer |
| 77507 | 77480 | Villenauxe-la-Petite |
| 77508 | 77174 | Villeneuve-le-Comte |
| 77509 | 77154 | Villeneuve-les-Bordes |
| 77510 | 77174 | Villeneuve-Saint-Denis |
| 77511 | 77230 | Villeneuve-sous-Dammartin |
| 77512 | 77510 | Villeneuve-sur-Bellot |
| 77513 | 77124 | Villenoy |
| 77514 | 77270 | Villeparisis |
| 77515 | 77410 | Villeroy |
| 77516 | 77130 | Ville-Saint-Jacques |
| 77517 | 77410 | Villevaudé |
| 77518 | 77190 | Villiers-en-Bière |
| 77519 | 77560 | Villiers-Saint-Georges |
| 77520 | 77760 | Villiers-sous-Grez |
| 77521 | 77580 | Villiers-sur-Morin |
| 77522 | 77114 | Villiers-sur-Seine |
| 77523 | 77480 | Villuis |
| 77524 | 77520 | Vimpelles |
| 77525 | 77230 | Vinantes |
| 77526 | 77139 | Vincy-Manœuvre |
| 77527 | 77540 | Voinsles |
| 77528 | 77950 | Voisenon |
| 77529 | 77580 | Voulangis |
| 77530 | 77560 | Voulton |
| 77531 | 77940 | Voulx |
| 77532 | 77160 | Vulaines-lès-Provins |
| 77533 | 77870 | Vulaines-sur-Seine |
| 77534 | 77390 | Yèbles |
