= Coulombs-en-Valois =

- Commune
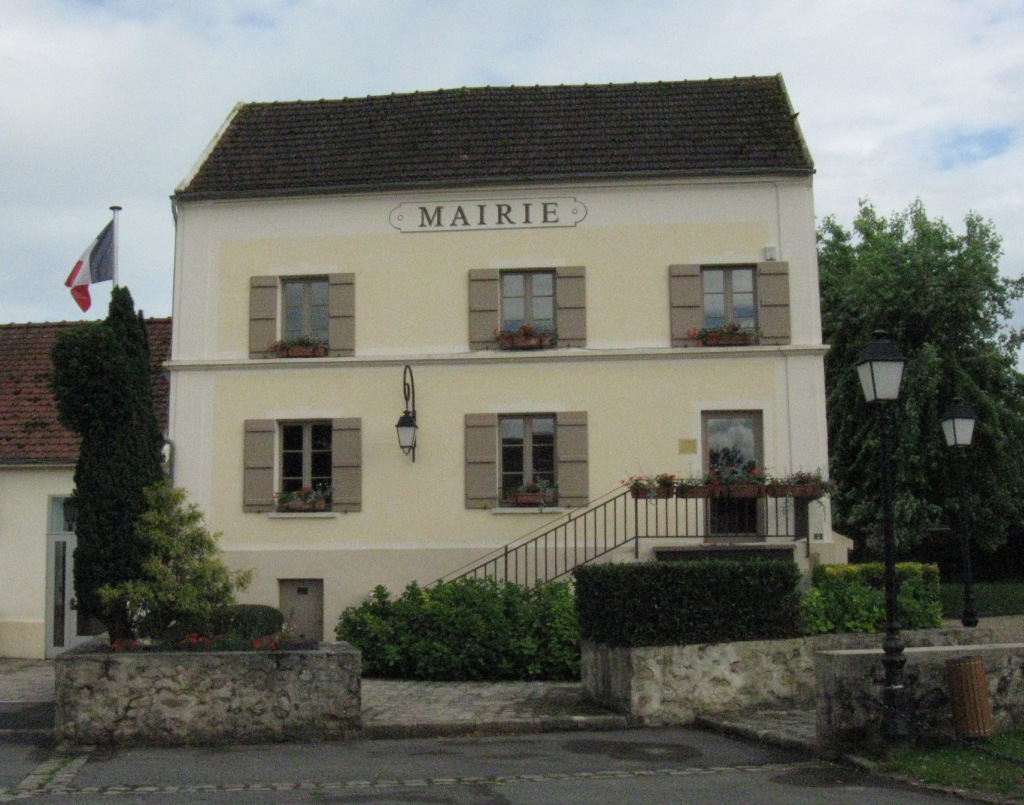
- The town hall in Coulombs-en-Valois
- Location of Coulombs-en-Valois
- Location within France Location within Île-de-France (region)
- Coordinates: 49°04′11″N 3°07′29″E
- Country: France
- Region: Île-de-France
- Department: Seine-et-Marne
- Arrondissement: Meaux
- Canton: La Ferté-sous-Jouarre
- Intercommunality: CC Pays de l'Ourcq

Government
  - Mayor (2020–2026): Catherine Boudot
- Area^{1}: 22.41 km^{2} (8.65 sq mi)
- Highest elevation: 198 m (650 ft)
- Lowest elevation: 62 m (203 ft)
- Population (2023): 576
  - Density: 25.7/km^{2} (66.6/sq mi)
- Time zone: UTC+01:00 (CET)
  - Summer (DST): UTC+02:00 (CEST)
- INSEE/Postal code: 77129 /77840
- ^{1} French Land Register data, which excludes lakes, ponds, glaciers > 1 km^{2} (0.386 sq mi or 247 acres) and river estuaries.

Coulombs-en-Valois (French pronunciation: [kulɔ̃ ɑ̃ valwa], lit. 'Coulombs in Valois') is a commune in the Seine-et-Marne department in the Île-de-France region.

== See also ==
- Communes of the Seine-et-Marne department
