= Canton of Meaux-Sud =

Coordinates: 48°56′17″N 2°52′55″E

Meaux-Sud
- Former canton
- Interactive map of Meaux-Sud
- Country: France
- Region: Île-de-France
- Department: Seine-et-Marne
- No. of communes: {{{nbcomm}}}
- Disbanded: 2015
- Area: 68.47 km^{2} (26.44 sq mi)
- Population (2012): 36,698
  - Density: 536.0/km^{2} (1,388/sq mi)

The canton of Meaux-Sud is a French former administrative division, located in the arrondissement of Meaux, in the Seine-et-Marne département (Île-de-France région). It was disbanded following the French canton reorganisation which came into effect in March 2015.

== Demographics ==
Historical population
Year	Pop.	±%
1999	31,456	—
2006	33,024	+5.0%
2012	36,698	+11.1%

== Composition ==
The canton of Meaux-Sud was composed of 10 communes:

- Fublaines
- Isles-lès-Villenoy
- Mareuil-lès-Meaux
- Meaux (partly)
- Montceaux-lès-Meaux
- Nanteuil-lès-Meaux
- Trilbardou
- Trilport
- Vignely
- Villenoy

== See also ==
- Cantons of the Seine-et-Marne department
- Communes of the Seine-et-Marne department
