= Canton of Meaux-Nord =

Coordinates: 48°59′12″N 2°53′40″E

Meaux-Nord
- Former canton
- Interactive map of Meaux-Nord
- Country: France
- Region: Île-de-France
- Department: Seine-et-Marne
- No. of communes: {{{nbcomm}}}
- Disbanded: 2015
- Area: 75.75 km^{2} (29.25 sq mi)
- Population (2012): 50,995
  - Density: 673.2/km^{2} (1,744/sq mi)

The canton of Meaux-Nord is a French former administrative division, located in the arrondissement of Meaux, in the Seine-et-Marne département (Île-de-France région). It was disbanded following the French canton reorganisation which came into effect in March 2015.

== Demographics ==
Historical population
Year	Pop.	±%
1999	46,472	—
2006	47,850	+3.0%
2012	50,995	+6.6%

== Composition ==
The canton of Meaux-Nord was composed of 9 communes:

- Barcy
- Chambry
- Crégy-lès-Meaux
- Germigny-l'Évêque
- Meaux (partly)
- Chauconin-Neufmontiers
- Penchard
- Poincy
- Varreddes

== See also ==
- Cantons of the Seine-et-Marne department
- Communes of the Seine-et-Marne department
