= Communauté de communes des Monts de la Goële =

Coordinates: 49.038°N 2.806°E

Monts de la Goële
- Former communauté de communes
- Country: France
- Region: Île-de-France
- Department: Seine-et-Marne
- No. of communes: {{{nbcomm}}}
- Established: September 1991
- Disbanded: 2017
- Area: 35.92 km^{2} (13.87 sq mi)
- Population (1999): 4,566
  - Density: 127.1/km^{2} (329.2/sq mi)

The Communauté de communes des Monts de la Goële is a former federation of municipalities (communauté de communes) in the Seine-et-Marne département and in the Île-de-France région of France. It was created in September 1991. It was merged into the Communauté d'agglomération du Pays de Meaux in January 2017.

== Composition ==
The Communauté de communes comprised the following communes:

- Forfry
- Gesvres-le-Chapitre
- Monthyon
- Saint-Soupplets

== See also ==
- Communes of the Seine-et-Marne department
