= Chambry =

Chambry may refer to:

- Chambry, Aisne, in the Aisne département
- Chambry, Seine-et-Marne, in the Seine-et-Marne département
- Chambry, former name of Chambrey, Moselle
