= Atelier Missor =

Classical foundry in Paris

- Founded: January 2021; 5 years ago
- Founder: Massoud Movahhed Ghaleh Nouri; Missor Movahhed Ghaleh Nouri
- Headquarters: 14 Avenue Henri Duflocq, Crégy-lès-Meaux, France 77124
- Products: Neoclassical sculptures
- Website: www.ateliermissor.com

Atelier Missor (lit. 'Studio of Missor') is a neoclassical foundry located outside of Paris, France. Their primary focus is creating sculptures of great men and women of Western civilization, such as Napoleon and Joan of Arc.

== Origins and early years ==
Atelier Missor was founded in Nice in January 2021 by Persian-French brothers Massoud and Missor Movahhed Ghaleh Nouri, who were disillusioned by the state of modern sculpture and sought to create pieces similar to those found in classical antiquity. They stated in one interview they were students of Friedrich Nietzsche.

The foundry began selling small busts, although lacked a focus on budgeting and quickly went into debt. This was until Mayor of Nice Christian Estrosi commissioned a statue of Joan of Arc, which came after the city had already been gifted a three-meter bronze statue of Napoleon some months back. It was built by the Nouris' foundry, and it was unveiled in 2024 as a 9-tonne, gilded statue in the city center at a cost of €170,000. Many criticized Estrosi's choice of builders, claiming that favoritism was involved, which was denied by Estrosi. The regional government spent a few months deliberating before ruling that the proper rules for commissioning a contractor were not abided by, and the statue was ordered to be removed and Atelier Missor refunded. The city of Mátészalka's Christian Democratic People's Party offered to relocate the sculpture to their city. On July 17, 2025, the Marseille Court of Appeal overturned the previous ruling and declared it could remain at its location on Avenue Saint Lambert.

== Work in the United States ==
Amid a wave of controversy surrounding French politician Raphaël Glucksmann calling for the repatriation of the Statue of Liberty, the foundry stated "Keep the statue of Liberty; it's rightfully yours. But get ready for another one. A New Statue of Liberty, much bigger, made from titanium to withstand millions of years." Such comments received attention by American businessman Elon Musk on Twitter, and during a visit in 2025 to the US, the founders drafted plans for a potential 20-meter-tall statue of Prometheus at Starbase, Texas. The in-progress statue was revealed in August 2026 and announced as complete via X (Twitter).

In October 2025, Atelier Missor made an official statement seeking visas to work in the US to build The Guardian of Liberty, which they proposed as "the largest statue in the West." They shared a desire to build it to commemorate the United States Semiquincentennial. They announced the plans with a photograph of them with a 25-foot scale model of the design.

As of 2026, the company is no longer producing commercial sculptures for purchase, and has pivoted to working on large, private-commission statues. In the summer of 2026, they sculpted and installed 12 bronze statues of Revolutionary War heroes in Freedom Plaza, Washington D.C, under president Donald Trump.

As of June 2025, they were seeking local investment in the United States to relocate their workshop.

== Public image ==
Elon Musk and Hungary's Christian Democratic People's Party, as well as a slew of other right-wing individuals, have stated their admiration for the foundry, primarily due to its romanticism of the past and Western Empire. Many figues on the other side of the political spectrum have declared online their dislike of the organization. The New Republic, for one, called its founders "...denizens of the anti-woke mansphere" and noted the lack of women in the organization.
