= Eugène Boch =

Belgian painter (1855–1941)

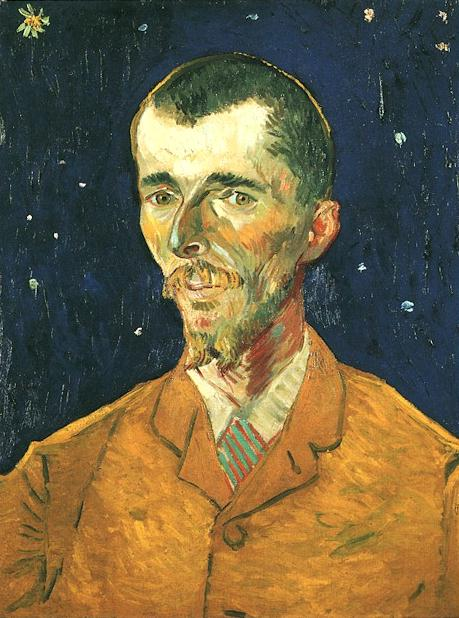
- The Poet: Eugène Boch, portrait by Vincent van Gogh, 1888
- Born: 1 September 1855; Saint-Vaast, La Louvière, Hainaut, Belgium
- Died: 3 January 1941 (aged 85); Monthyon, Seine-et-Marne, German-Occupied France
- Known for: Painting

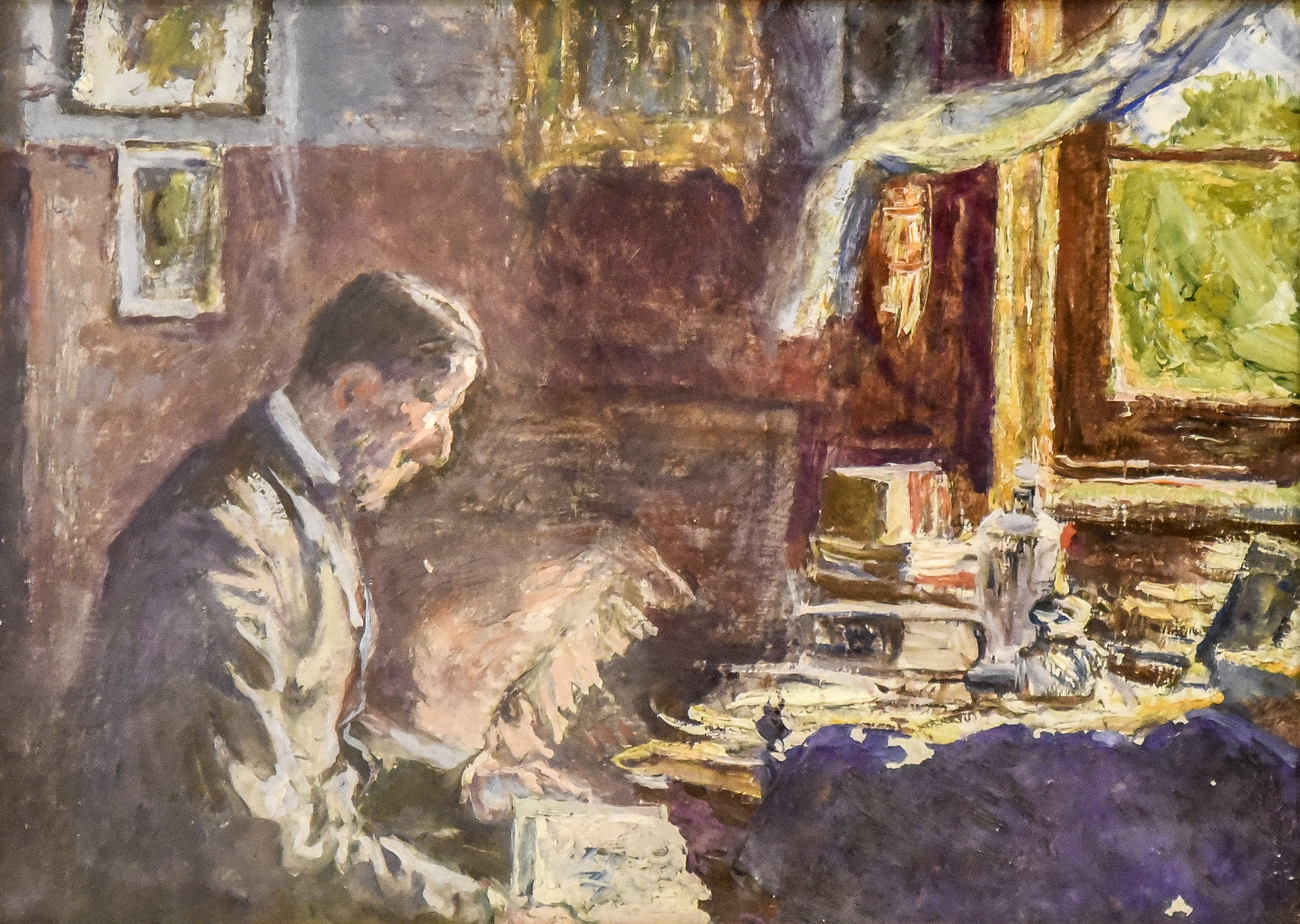
Painting by Anna Boch (1848-1936) "Eugène Boch at His Desk"

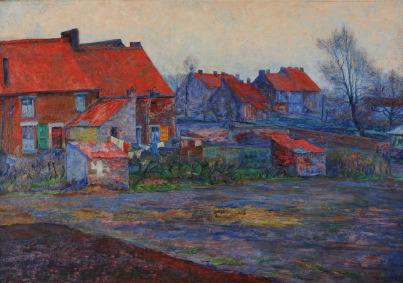
Eugène Boch "The Red Roofs"

Eugène Boch (1 September 1855 – 3 January 1941) was a Belgian painter, born in Saint-Vaast, La Louvière, Hainaut. He was the younger brother of Anna Boch, the only female member of Les XX.

== Life ==
Eugène Boch was born into the fifth generation of the Boch family, a wealthy dynasty of manufacturers of fine china and ceramics, still active today under the firm of Villeroy & Boch. In 1879 he enrolled in the private atelier of Léon Bonnat in Paris. In 1882, when Bonnat closed his atelier, Boch continued his studies at the atelier of Fernand Cormon. The Salon admitted some of his work in 1882, 1883 and 1885.

In 1888, Boch was introduced by Dodge MacKnight to Vincent van Gogh.

In 1892 he settled in Monthyon (Seine-and-Marne), not far from Paris. In 1909, he married Anne-Marie Léonie Crusfond (?–1933), and in 1910 they moved to their recently built chalet "La Grimpette", where both lived out their lives.

Boch supported poor artists of talent, including Émile Bernard, whom he met at the Atelier Cormon, and Paul Gauguin. He also exchanged works with many artists, including by Van Gogh, and little by little, grew an important collection of contemporary art. Boch and his sister Anna spent a large part of the family fortune promoting other artists. They bought pictures from many leading contemporaries of their time, the majority of whom were also their friends.

In 1888, Van Gogh painted Boch's portrait, The Poet, which Van Gogh hung, along with Milliet, in his bedroom. It is now in the Musée d'Orsay. In a letter to his brother Theo about the painting, Van Gogh described his artistic approach and vision for the portrait.

Because instead of trying to render exactly what I have before my eyes, I use color more arbitrarily in order to express myself forcefully. Well, let’s let that lie as far as theory goes, but I’m going to give you an example of what I mean.

I’d like to do the portrait of an artist friend who dreams great dreams, who works as the nightingale sings, because that’s his nature.

This man will be blond. I’d like to put in the painting my appreciation, my love that I have for him.

I’ll paint him, then, just as he is, as faithfully as I can — to begin with.

But the painting isn’t finished like that. To finish it, I’m now going to be an arbitrary colorist.

I exaggerate the blond of the hair, I come to orange tones, chromes, pale lemon. Behind the head — instead of painting the dull wall of the mean room, I paint the infinite.

Boch received Van Gogh's portrait of him, The Poet, from Johanna van Gogh-Bonger, Van Gogh's sister-in-law.

After his death, Boch's great-nephew Luitwin von Boch purchased part of Boch's collection with the intention of creating a museum for the work of Boch and his sister Anna.
