= Dodge MacKnight =

American modernist watercolor painter (1860–1950)

Dodge Macknight
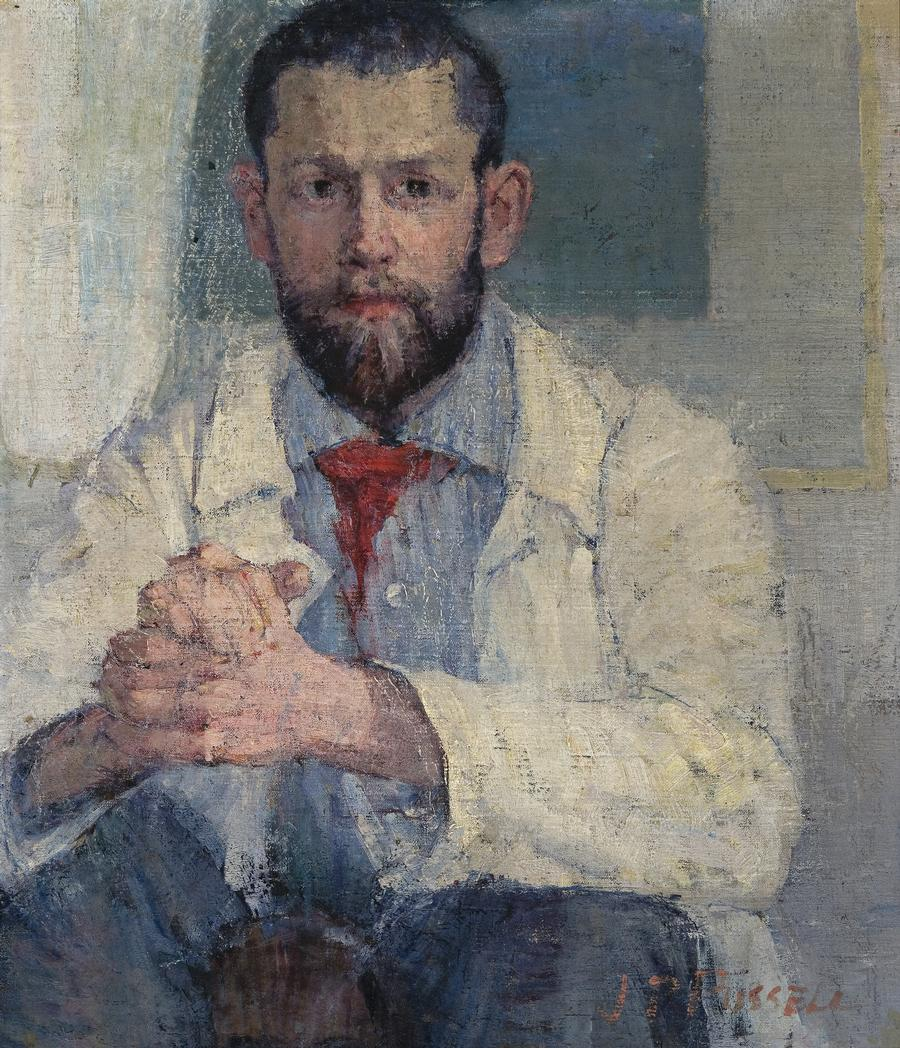
- Portrait of Macknight by John Peter Russell (c. 1888)
- Born: William Dodge Macknight; October 1, 1860; Providence, Rhode Island, U.S.
- Died: May 23, 1950 (aged 89); East Sandwich, Massachusetts, U.S.
- Education: Atelier Cormon
- Known for: Painting, watercolor
- Movement: Modernism
- Spouse: Louise Queyrel (1871–1931; m. 1889)
- Children: John Eugene "Peter" Macknight (1893–1928)
- Patrons: Isabella Stewart Gardner, Desmond Fitzgerald, Denman Waldo Ross

William Dodge Macknight (October 1, 1860 – May 23, 1950) was an American modernist painter who worked primarily in watercolor. While his technique incorporated the Barbizon school and Impressionist practice of working en plein air, he combined it with the high-key color of Post-Impressionism and an expressive palette dominated by purples and magentas governed by a keen observation of nature rather than adherence to a specific movement.

Macknight gained broad recognition through landmark survey exhibitions in the early 1920s. In 1921, the Copley Society in Boston exhibited his watercolors alongside those of Winslow Homer and John Singer Sargent. That same year, twelve of his watercolors were featured in the Brooklyn Museum's landmark Exhibition of Water Color Paintings by American Artists, introducing his work to broader national audiences. Modernist painter and critic Marsden Hartley singled him out in his 1921 collection Adventures in the Arts, writing that Macknight "has added to this a passion for impressionistic veracity which heightens his own work to a point distinctly above that of Sargent, and one might almost say above Winslow Homer." British art critic C. Lewis Hind likewise named him one of the world's four greatest modern watercolorists alongside Homer, Sargent, and Hercules Brabazon Brabazon. In 1923, sixty-three of Macknight's watercolors were exhibited in Paris at the Association Franco-Américaine's Exposition d'art Américain with Homer, Sargent, and sculptor Paul Manship.

While living in France in the late 1880s, Macknight formed friendships with Australian Impressionist John Peter Russell and Belgian painter Eugène Boch. He maintained an association with Vincent van Gogh in the south of France, where the artists exchanged ideas on color and technique. During this period, Macknight's work drew the attention of his two primary lifelong patrons, Isabella Stewart Gardner and Desmond Fitzgerald.

== Early life and European years (1860–1897) ==
Macknight was born in Providence, Rhode Island. He apprenticed as a scenic painter locally and in New Bedford, Massachusetts, followed by work for the Tabor Art Company producing fine art and photographic reproductions. In the winter of 1884, he traveled to Paris to study at the atelier of academic painter Fernand Cormon.

At Cormon's studio, Macknight met Henri de Toulouse-Lautrec, Émile Bernard, and John Peter Russell. In 1888, Macknight moved to Fontvieille, near Arles, where Van Gogh was living. The two visited each other regularly, and Macknight introduced Van Gogh to Belgian artist Eugène Boch, who subsequently sat for Van Gogh's portrait The Poet. Van Gogh frequently discussed Macknight in his correspondence with his brother Theo and Russell. In 1890, Macknight exhibited watercolors in London at the studio of John Singer Sargent.

Macknight married Louise Queyrel (born 1871), a native of a small village in the Hautes-Alpes, who had worked as governess for the Russell family on Belle-Île, off the coast of Brittany—where Macknight, Claude Monet, and later Henri Matisse painted. The couple lived in Spain, where their son John Eugene "Peter" Macknight was born in 1893, before returning to the United States in 1897 following fourteen years in Europe amid political tensions preceding the Spanish–American War.

== American career and patrons (1897–1926) ==
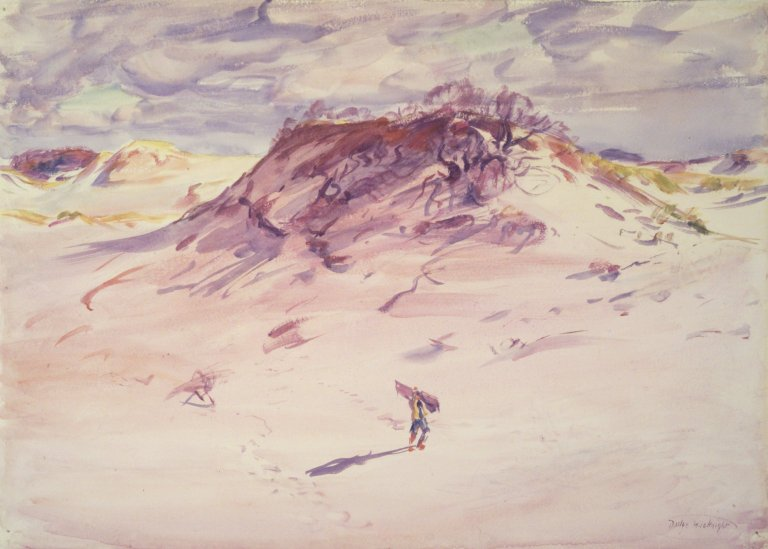
Sand Dunes, Cape Cod, watercolor, Brooklyn Museum

Upon returning to the United States, Macknight stayed briefly in Greenfield, Massachusetts, and Mystic, Connecticut, before settling in East Sandwich on Cape Cod, where he lived for the remainder of his life. Between 1900 and 1926, he undertook painting trips across Spain, Morocco, Mexico, Jamaica, Bermuda, Canada, New Hampshire, and the American West (including Arizona, Utah, and Oregon), frequently returning to the same regions to execute landscape series in watercolor.

His career was championed by major collectors:

- Isabella Stewart Gardner: Gardner acquired ten watercolors and one pastel by Macknight. On the ground floor of Fenway Court, she created the "Macknight Room," the only gallery in the museum named for a contemporary artist.
- Desmond Fitzgerald: A civil engineer specializing in hydraulic systems and an early American collector of French Impressionism, Fitzgerald was a friend of Claude Monet and a visitor to Giverny. Fitzgerald assembled at least 300 works by Macknight—the central focus of his art collection—and built a private gallery beside his Brookline home that was periodically opened to the public. In 1916, Fitzgerald authored and privately printed an illustrated monograph on the artist.
- Denman Waldo Ross: A painter, Harvard University design theorist, and trustee of the Museum of Fine Arts, Boston, Ross studied Macknight's palette, painted a 1911 portrait of Macknight's son John, and had his own work hung alongside Macknight's in Gardner's Macknight Room.

Macknight held regular solo exhibitions at Boston's Doll & Richards Gallery through 1929, finding an active commercial market.

== Later life and legacy (1926–1950) ==
Fitzgerald died in 1926. In 1928, Macknight's son John died, followed by his wife Louise in 1931. Following these personal losses, along with the onset of the Great Depression and shifts in market taste, Macknight ceased exhibiting commercially and producing watercolors for commercial sale. He continued painting into advanced age and focused his creative efforts on his East Sandwich home and gardens, "The Hedges" (renamed Hedgerow in 1955). Macknight died at home in East Sandwich on May 23, 1950, at the age of 89.

== Selected public collections ==
- Isabella Stewart Gardner Museum, Boston, Massachusetts
- Museum of Fine Arts, Boston, Massachusetts
- Harvard Art Museums (Fogg Museum), Cambridge, Massachusetts
- Yale University Art Gallery, New Haven, Connecticut
- Brooklyn Museum, New York

== See also ==
- American Impressionism
- The Boston School
- List of works by Vincent van Gogh
