= Communauté d'agglomération du Pays de Meaux =

Coordinates: 48.96°N 2.88°E

Pays de Meaux
- Communauté d'agglomération
- Country: France
- Region: Île-de-France
- Department: Seine-et-Marne
- No. of communes: {{{nbcomm}}}
- Established: January 2003

Government
  - President: Jean-François Copé
- Area: 214.4 km^{2} (82.8 sq mi)
- Population (2018): 106,448
  - Density: 496.5/km^{2} (1,286/sq mi)
- Website: www.paysdemeaux.com

The Communauté d'agglomération du Pays de Meaux (CAPM) is a communauté d'agglomération in the Seine-et-Marne département and in the Île-de-France région of France. The 4 communes of the former Communauté de communes des Monts de la Goële were merged into it on 1 January 2017. On 31 December 2019 it was expanded with 4 communes from the former communauté de communes du Pays Créçois. Its area is 214.4 km^{2}. Its population was 106,448 in 2018, of which 55,416 in Meaux.

== Composition ==
The communauté d'agglomération consists of the following 26 communes:

1. Barcy
2. Boutigny
3. Chambry
4. Chauconin-Neufmontiers
5. Crégy-lès-Meaux
6. Forfry
7. Fublaines
8. Germigny-l'Évêque
9. Gesvres-le-Chapitre
10. Isles-lès-Villenoy
11. Mareuil-lès-Meaux
12. Meaux
13. Montceaux-lès-Meaux
14. Monthyon
15. Nanteuil-lès-Meaux
16. Penchard
17. Poincy
18. Quincy-Voisins
19. Saint-Fiacre
20. Saint-Soupplets
21. Trilbardou
22. Trilport
23. Varreddes
24. Vignely
25. Villemareuil
26. Villenoy

== See also ==
- Communes of the Seine-et-Marne department
