= Saint-Mesmes =

- Commune
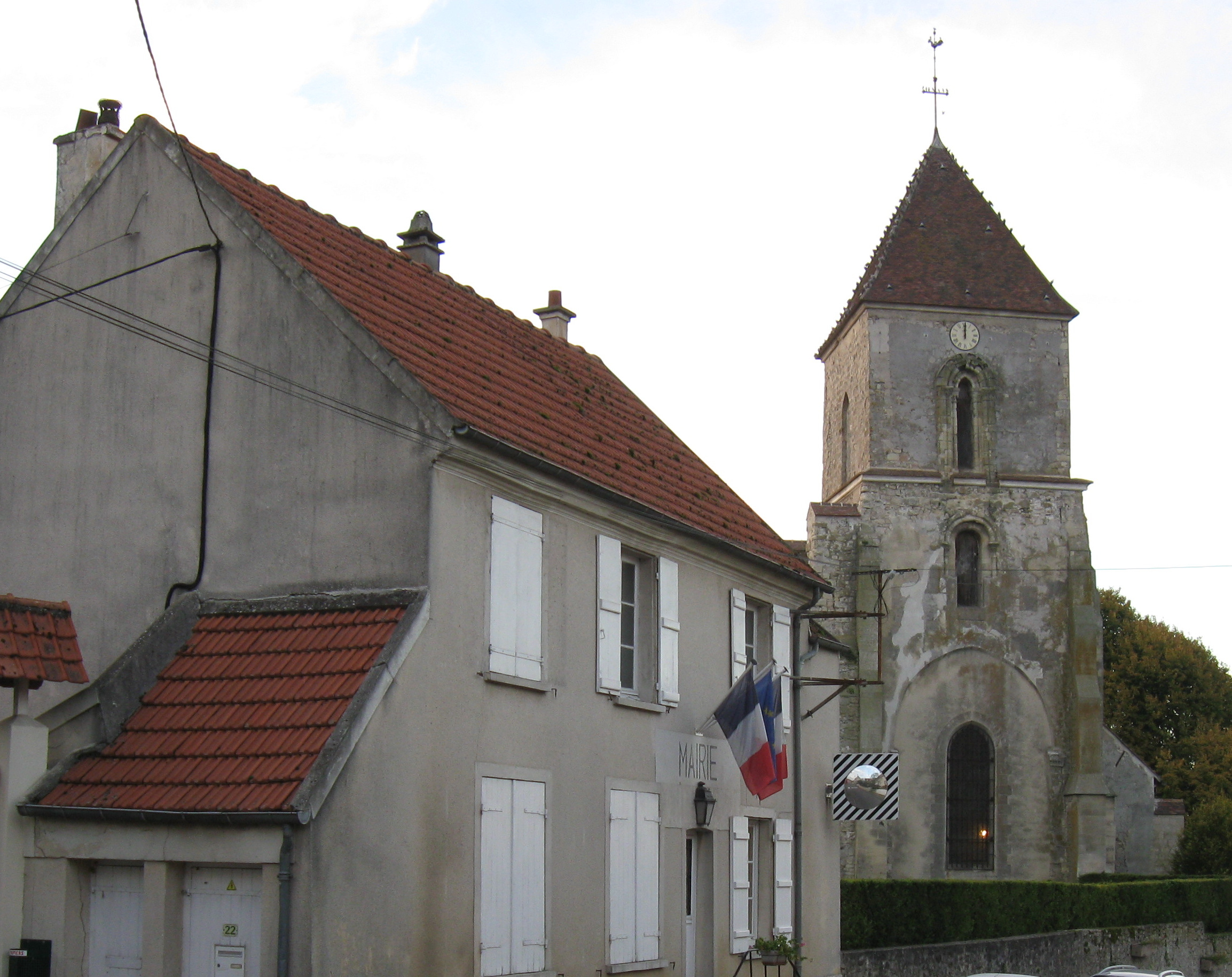
- The town hall of Saint-Mesmes and the church Saint-Maxime

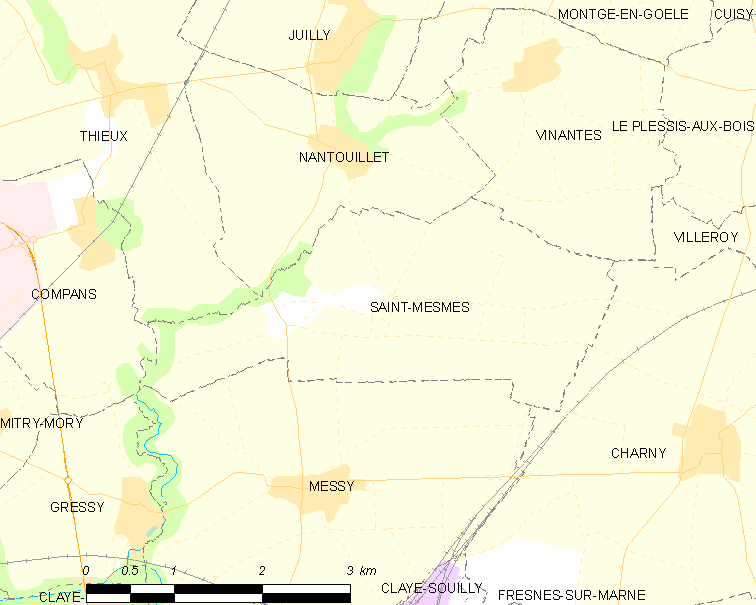
- Location of Saint-Mesmes
- Location within France Location within Île-de-France (region)
- Coordinates: 48°59′00″N 2°42′00″E
- Country: France
- Region: Île-de-France
- Department: Seine-et-Marne
- Arrondissement: Meaux
- Canton: Claye-Souilly
- Intercommunality: CC Plaines et Monts de France

Government
  - Mayor (2020–2026): Alfred Stadler
- Area^{1}: 7.69 km^{2} (2.97 sq mi)
- Highest elevation: 118 m (387 ft)
- Lowest elevation: 57 m (187 ft)
- Population (2023): 579
  - Density: 75.3/km^{2} (195/sq mi)
- Time zone: UTC+01:00 (CET)
  - Summer (DST): UTC+02:00 (CEST)
- INSEE/Postal code: 77427 /77410
- ^{1} French Land Register data, which excludes lakes, ponds, glaciers > 1 km^{2} (0.386 sq mi or 247 acres) and river estuaries.

Saint-Mesmes (French pronunciation: [sɛ̃ mɛm]) is a commune in the Seine-et-Marne department in the Île-de-France region in north-central France.

== Demographics ==
Inhabitants of Saint-Mesmes are called Maximois.

== See also ==
- Communes of the Seine-et-Marne department
