= Iverny =

- Commune
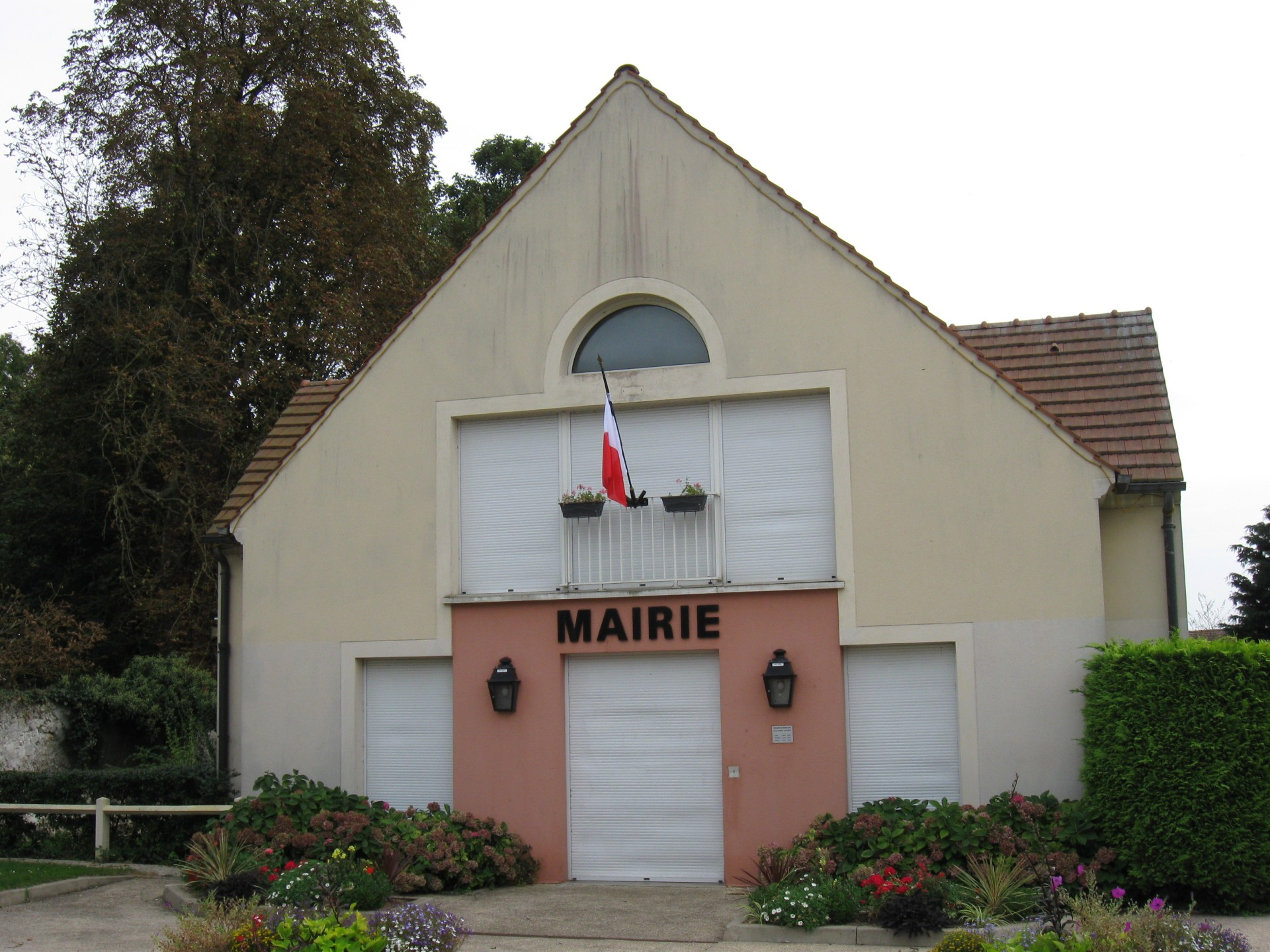
- The town hall in Iverny
- Location of Iverny
- Location within France Location within Île-de-France (region)
- Coordinates: 49°00′00″N 2°47′18″E
- Country: France
- Region: Île-de-France
- Department: Seine-et-Marne
- Arrondissement: Meaux
- Canton: Claye-Souilly
- Intercommunality: CC Plaines et Monts de France

Government
  - Mayor (2020–2026): Olivier Stehlin
- Area^{1}: 1.76 km^{2} (0.68 sq mi)
- Highest elevation: 123 m (404 ft)
- Lowest elevation: 94 m (308 ft)
- Population (2023): 618
  - Density: 351/km^{2} (909/sq mi)
- Time zone: UTC+01:00 (CET)
  - Summer (DST): UTC+02:00 (CEST)
- INSEE/Postal code: 77233 /77165
- ^{1} French Land Register data, which excludes lakes, ponds, glaciers > 1 km^{2} (0.386 sq mi or 247 acres) and river estuaries.

Iverny (French pronunciation: [ivɛʁni]) is a commune in the Seine-et-Marne department in the Île-de-France region in north-central France.

== Demographics ==
Inhabitants are called Ivernais.

== See also ==
- Communes of the Seine-et-Marne department
