= Canton of Claye-Souilly =

Coordinates: 48°55′42″N 2°38′54″E

Claye-Souilly
- Canton
- Country: France
- Region: Île-de-France
- Department: Seine-et-Marne
- No. of communes: {{{nbcomm}}}
- Area: 231.06 km^{2} (89.21 sq mi)
- Population (2023): 58,315
  - Density: 252.38/km^{2} (653.66/sq mi)
- INSEE code: 77 03

The canton of Claye-Souilly is a French administrative division, located in the arrondissement of Torcy, in the Seine-et-Marne département (Île-de-France région).

== Demographics ==
Historical population
Year	Pop.	±% p.a.
2013	50,826	—
2018	54,842	+1.53%
Source: INSEE

== Composition ==
At the French canton reorganisation which came into effect in March 2015, the canton was expanded from 6 to 30 communes:

- Annet-sur-Marne
- Barcy
- Chambry
- Charmentray
- Charny
- Claye-Souilly
- Crégy-lès-Meaux
- Cuisy
- Forfry
- Fresnes-sur-Marne
- Gesvres-le-Chapitre
- Gressy
- Isles-lès-Villenoy
- Iverny
- Mareuil-lès-Meaux
- Messy
- Monthyon
- Chauconin-Neufmontiers
- Oissery
- Penchard
- Le Plessis-aux-Bois
- Le Plessis-l'Évêque
- Précy-sur-Marne
- Saint-Mesmes
- Saint-Soupplets
- Trilbardou
- Varreddes
- Vignely
- Villenoy
- seatroy

== See also ==
- Cantons of the Seine-et-Marne department
- Communes of the Seine-et-Marne department
