= Arrondissement of Meaux =

Coordinates: 48°57′28″N 2°53′08″E

Meaux
- Arrondissement
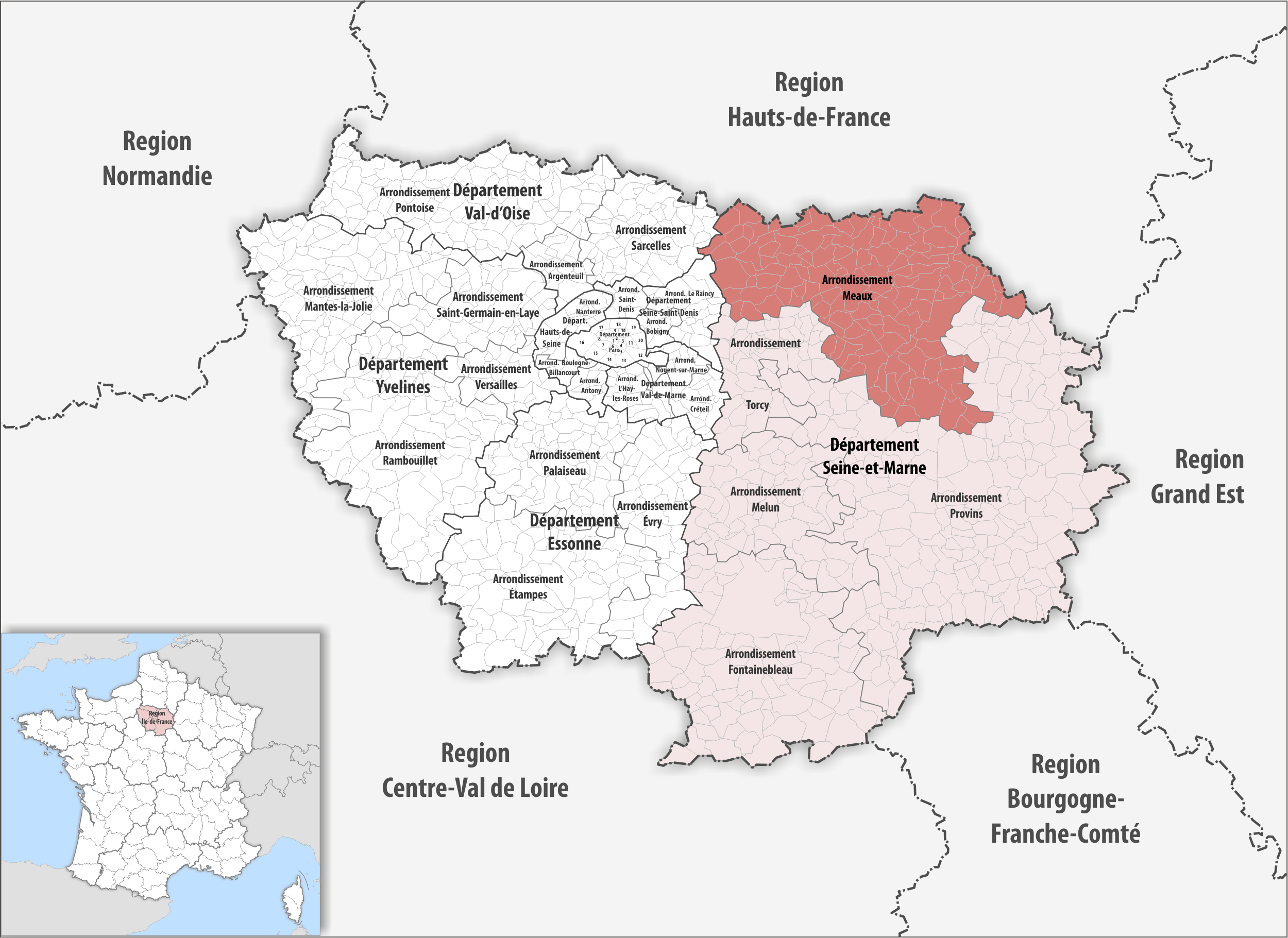
- Location within the region Île-de-France
- Country: France
- Region: Île-de-France
- Department: Seine-et-Marne
- No. of communes: {{{nbcomm}}}
- Area: 1,342.6 km^{2} (518.4 sq mi)
- Population (2023): 350,034
  - Density: 260.71/km^{2} (675.24/sq mi)
- INSEE code: 771

The arrondissement of Meaux is an arrondissement of France in the Seine-et-Marne department in the Île-de-France region. It has 139 communes. Its population is 342,766 (2021), and its area is 1,342.6 km^{2} (518.4 sq mi).

== Composition ==
The communes of the arrondissement of Meaux, and their INSEE codes, are:

1. Amillis (77002)
2. Annet-sur-Marne (77005)
3. Armentières-en-Brie (77008)
4. Aulnoy (77013)
5. Barcy (77023)
6. Bassevelle (77024)
7. Beautheil-Saints (77433)
8. Boissy-le-Châtel (77042)
9. Bouleurs (77047)
10. Boutigny (77049)
11. Bussières (77057)
12. La Celle-sur-Morin (77063)
13. Chailly-en-Brie (77070)
14. Chambry (77077)
15. Chamigny (77078)
16. Changis-sur-Marne (77084)
17. Charmentray (77094)
18. Charny (77095)
19. Chauconin-Neufmontiers (77335)
20. Chauffry (77106)
21. Chevru (77113)
22. Citry (77117)
23. Claye-Souilly (77118)
24. Cocherel (77120)
25. Compans (77123)
26. Condé-Sainte-Libiaire (77125)
27. Congis-sur-Thérouanne (77126)
28. Couilly-Pont-aux-Dames (77128)
29. Coulombs-en-Valois (77129)
30. Coulommes (77130)
31. Coulommiers (77131)
32. Coutevroult (77141)
33. Crécy-la-Chapelle (77142)
34. Crégy-lès-Meaux (77143)
35. Crouy-sur-Ourcq (77148)
36. Cuisy (77150)
37. Dagny (77151)
38. Dammartin-en-Goële (77153)
39. Dammartin-sur-Tigeaux (77154)
40. Dhuisy (77157)
41. Douy-la-Ramée (77163)
42. Étrépilly (77173)
43. Faremoutiers (77176)
44. La Ferté-sous-Jouarre (77183)
45. Forfry (77193)
46. Fresnes-sur-Marne (77196)
47. Fublaines (77199)
48. Germigny-l'Évêque (77203)
49. Germigny-sous-Coulombs (77204)
50. Gesvres-le-Chapitre (77205)
51. Giremoutiers (77206)
52. Gressy (77214)
53. Guérard (77219)
54. Hautefeuille (77224)
55. La Haute-Maison (77225)
56. Isles-les-Meldeuses (77231)
57. Isles-lès-Villenoy (77232)
58. Iverny (77233)
59. Jaignes (77235)
60. Jouarre (77238)
61. Juilly (77241)
62. Lizy-sur-Ourcq (77257)
63. Longperrier (77259)
64. Luzancy (77265)
65. Maisoncelles-en-Brie (77270)
66. Marchémoret (77273)
67. Marcilly (77274)
68. Mareuil-lès-Meaux (77276)
69. Marolles-en-Brie (77278)
70. Mary-sur-Marne (77280)
71. Mauperthuis (77281)
72. Mauregard (77282)
73. May-en-Multien (77283)
74. Meaux (77284)
75. Méry-sur-Marne (77290)
76. Le Mesnil-Amelot (77291)
77. Messy (77292)
78. Mitry-Mory (77294)
79. Montceaux-lès-Meaux (77300)
80. Montgé-en-Goële (77308)
81. Monthyon (77309)
82. Mouroux (77320)
83. Moussy-le-Neuf (77322)
84. Moussy-le-Vieux (77323)
85. Nanteuil-lès-Meaux (77330)
86. Nanteuil-sur-Marne (77331)
87. Nantouillet (77332)
88. Ocquerre (77343)
89. Oissery (77344)
90. Othis (77349)
91. Penchard (77358)
92. Pézarches (77360)
93. Pierre-Levée (77361)
94. Le Pin (77363)
95. Le Plessis-aux-Bois (77364)
96. Le Plessis-l'Évêque (77366)
97. Le Plessis-Placy (77367)
98. Poincy (77369)
99. Pommeuse (77371)
100. Précy-sur-Marne (77376)
101. Puisieux (77380)
102. Quincy-Voisins (77382)
103. Reuil-en-Brie (77388)
104. Rouvres (77392)
105. Saâcy-sur-Marne (77397)
106. Saint-Augustin (77400)
107. Sainte-Aulde (77401)
108. Saint-Fiacre (77408)
109. Saint-Jean-les-Deux-Jumeaux (77415)
110. Saint-Mard (77420)
111. Saint-Mesmes (77427)
112. Saint-Pathus (77430)
113. Saint-Soupplets (77437)
114. Sammeron (77440)
115. Sancy (77443)
116. Sept-Sorts (77448)
117. Signy-Signets (77451)
118. Tancrou (77460)
119. Thieux (77462)
120. Tigeaux (77466)
121. Touquin (77469)
122. Trilbardou (77474)
123. Trilport (77475)
124. Trocy-en-Multien (77476)
125. Ussy-sur-Marne (77478)
126. Varreddes (77483)
127. Vaucourtois (77484)
128. Vendrest (77490)
129. Vignely (77498)
130. Villemareuil (77505)
131. Villeneuve-sous-Dammartin (77511)
132. Villenoy (77513)
133. Villeparisis (77514)
134. Villeroy (77515)
135. Villevaudé (77517)
136. Villiers-sur-Morin (77521)
137. Vinantes (77525)
138. Vincy-Manœuvre (77526)
139. Voulangis (77529)

== History ==
The arrondissement of Meaux was created in 1800. In 1993 it lost the six cantons of Claye-Souilly, Lagny-sur-Marne, Torcy, Vaires-sur-Marne, Champs-sur-Marne and Noisiel to the new arrondissement of Noisiel (since 1994 Torcy). In 2006 it lost the canton of Rebais to the arrondissement of Provins. At the January 2017 reorganisation of the arrondissements of Seine-et-Marne, it received 10 communes from the arrondissement of Provins and five communes from the arrondissement of Torcy. In December 2019 the communes Esbly, Montry and Saint-Germain-sur-Morin passed from the arrondissement of Meaux to the arrondissement of Torcy.

As a result of the reorganisation of the cantons of France which came into effect in 2015, the borders of the cantons are no longer related to the borders of the arrondissements. The cantons of the arrondissement of Meaux were, as of January 2015:

1. Coulommiers
2. Crécy-la-Chapelle
3. Dammartin-en-Goële
4. La Ferté-sous-Jouarre
5. Lizy-sur-Ourcq
6. Meaux-Nord
7. Meaux-Sud
8. Mitry-Mory
