= Isles-lès-Villenoy =

- Commune
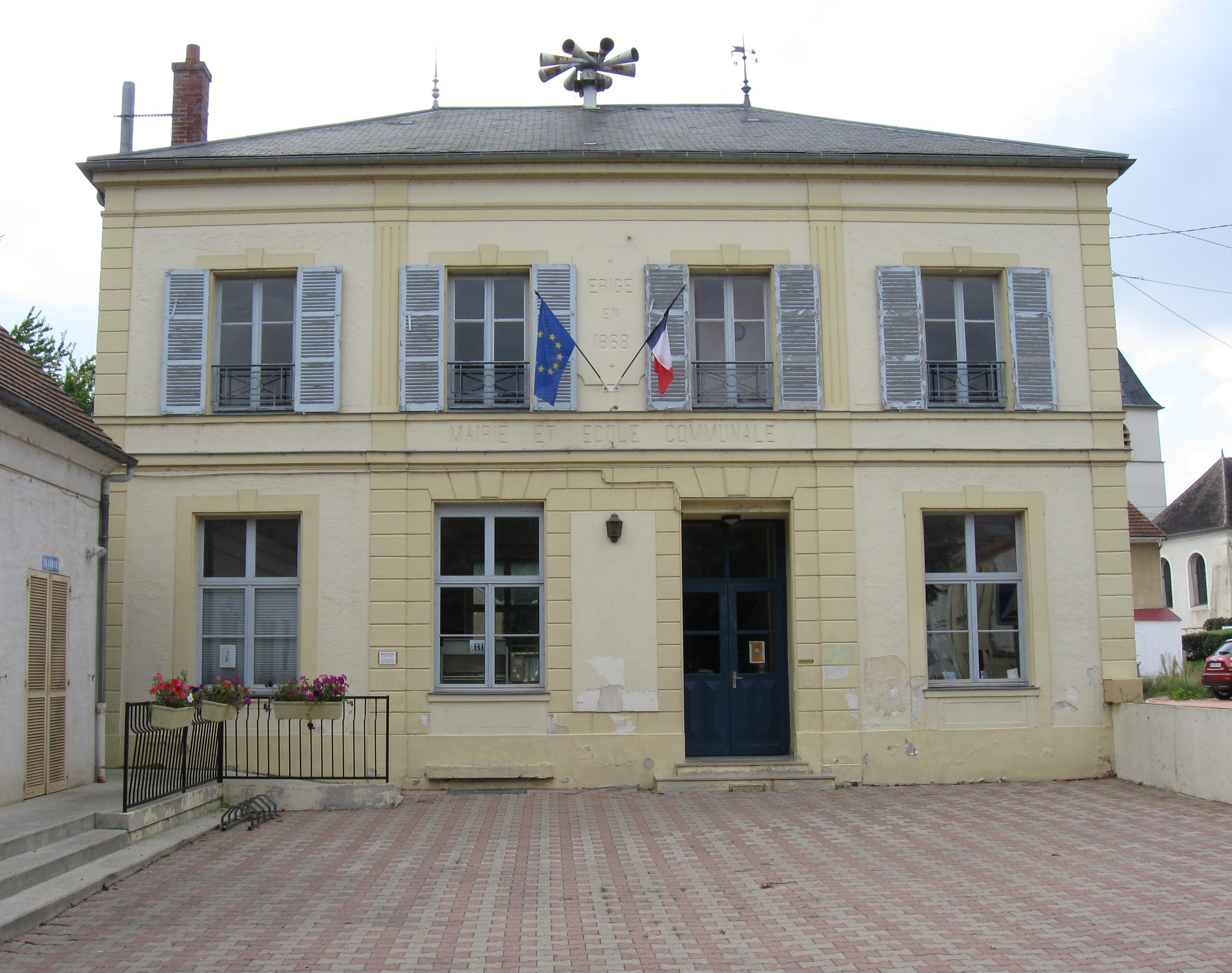
- The town hall in Isles-lès-Villenoy

- Coat of arms
- Location of Isles-lès-Villenoy
- Location within France Location within Île-de-France (region)
- Coordinates: 48°54′40″N 2°49′44″E
- Country: France
- Region: Île-de-France
- Department: Seine-et-Marne
- Arrondissement: Meaux
- Canton: Claye-Souilly
- Intercommunality: Pays de Meaux

Government
  - Mayor (2020–2026): Frederic Hervier
- Area^{1}: 6.97 km^{2} (2.69 sq mi)
- Highest elevation: 72 m (236 ft)
- Lowest elevation: 40 m (130 ft)
- Population (2023): 1,129
  - Density: 162/km^{2} (420/sq mi)
- Time zone: UTC+01:00 (CET)
  - Summer (DST): UTC+02:00 (CEST)
- INSEE/Postal code: 77232 /77450
- ^{1} French Land Register data, which excludes lakes, ponds, glaciers > 1 km^{2} (0.386 sq mi or 247 acres) and river estuaries.

Isles-lès-Villenoy (French pronunciation: [il lɛ vilnwa]) is a commune in the Seine-et-Marne department in the Île-de-France region in north-central France.

== Demographics ==
Inhabitants are called Insuvilais.

== History ==
Isles-lès-Villenoy has existed at least since the Merovingian period, and according to legend, Charles the Simple had a castle there. The village became significant when a toll bridge over the river Marne was built in 1839. At that point, the town became a holiday destination. In 1924, Isles-lès-Villenoy was attached to the canton of Meaux.

== See also ==
- Communes of the Seine-et-Marne department
