= Trilport =

Commune in Île-de-France, France

- Commune
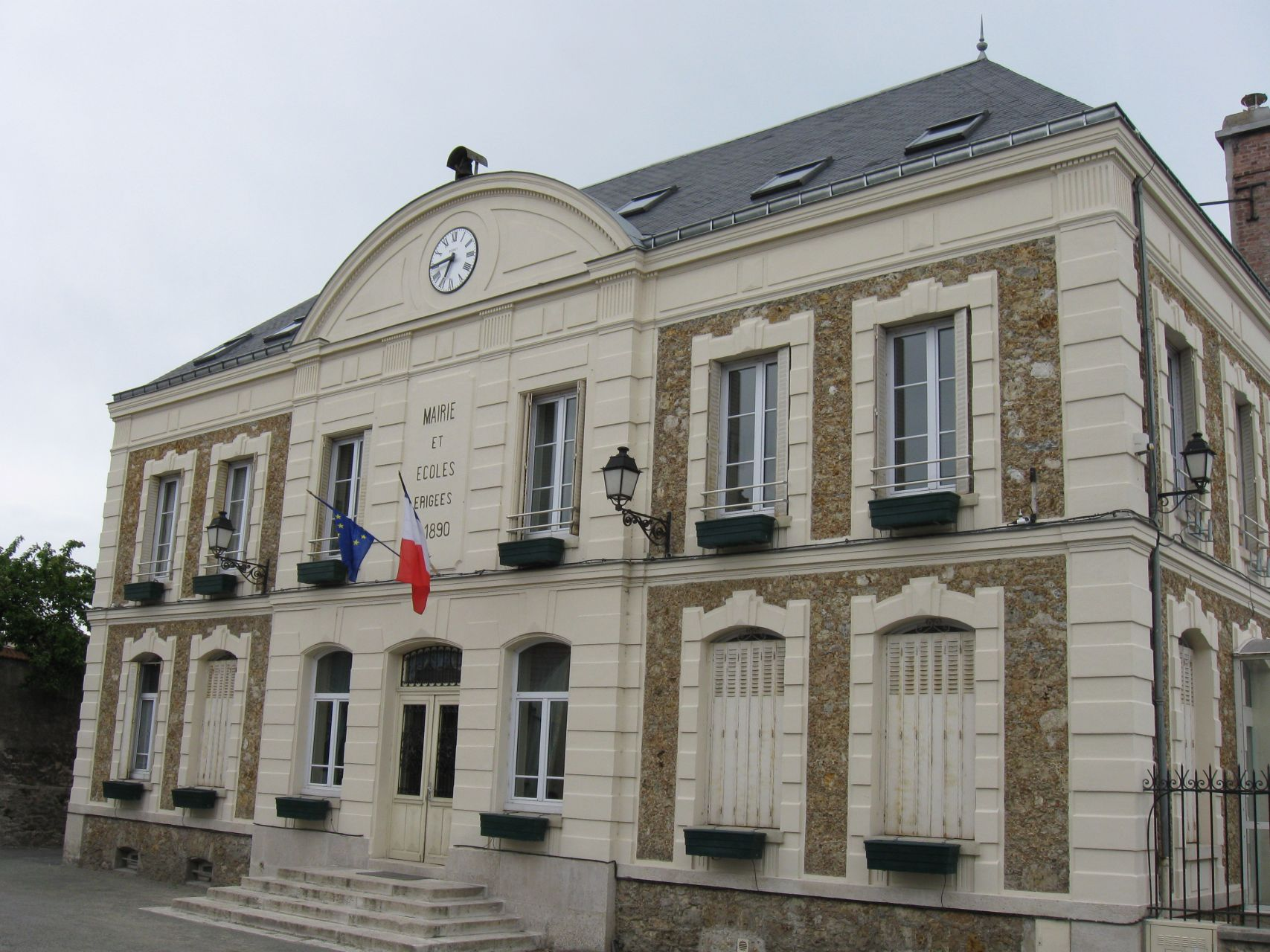
- The town hall of Trilport

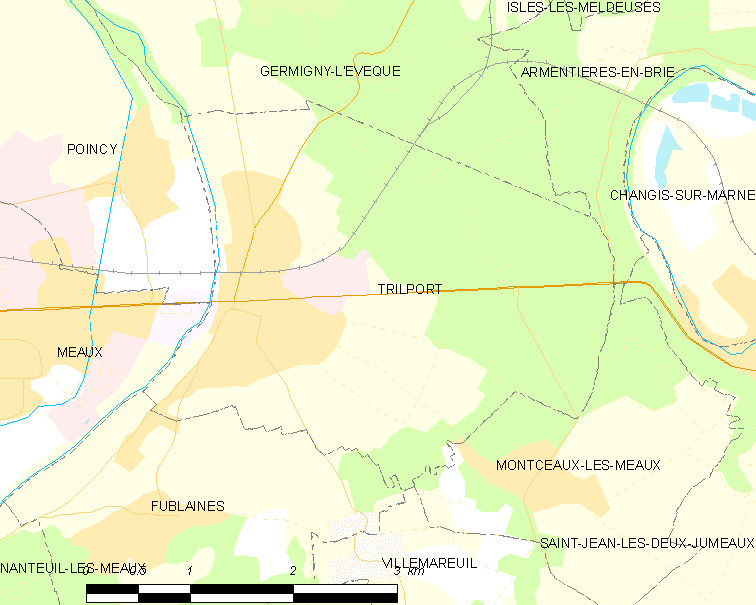
- Location of Trilport
- Location within France Location within Île-de-France (region)
- Coordinates: 48°57′25″N 2°56′57″E
- Country: France
- Region: Île-de-France
- Department: Seine-et-Marne
- Arrondissement: Meaux
- Canton: La Ferté-sous-Jouarre
- Intercommunality: Pays de Meaux

Government
  - Mayor (2020–2026): Jean-Michel Morer
- Area^{1}: 10.97 km^{2} (4.24 sq mi)
- Highest elevation: 141 m (463 ft)
- Lowest elevation: 41 m (135 ft)
- Population (2023): 5,146
  - Density: 469.1/km^{2} (1,215/sq mi)
- Time zone: UTC+01:00 (CET)
  - Summer (DST): UTC+02:00 (CEST)
- INSEE/Postal code: 77475 /77470
- ^{1} French Land Register data, which excludes lakes, ponds, glaciers > 1 km^{2} (0.386 sq mi or 247 acres) and river estuaries.

Trilport (French: [tʁilpɔʁ]) is a commune in the Seine-et-Marne department in the Île-de-France region in north-central France.

== Demographics ==
Inhabitants of Trilport are called Trilportais in French.

Historical population
Year	Pop.	±% p.a.
1968	1,890	—
1975	2,487	+4.00%
1982	3,323	+4.23%
1990	3,825	+1.77%
1999	4,602	+2.08%
2007	4,817	+0.57%
2012	4,898	+0.33%
2017	5,033	+0.55%
2023	5,146	+0.37%
Source: INSEE

== See also ==
- Communes of the Seine-et-Marne department
