= Vignely =

- Commune
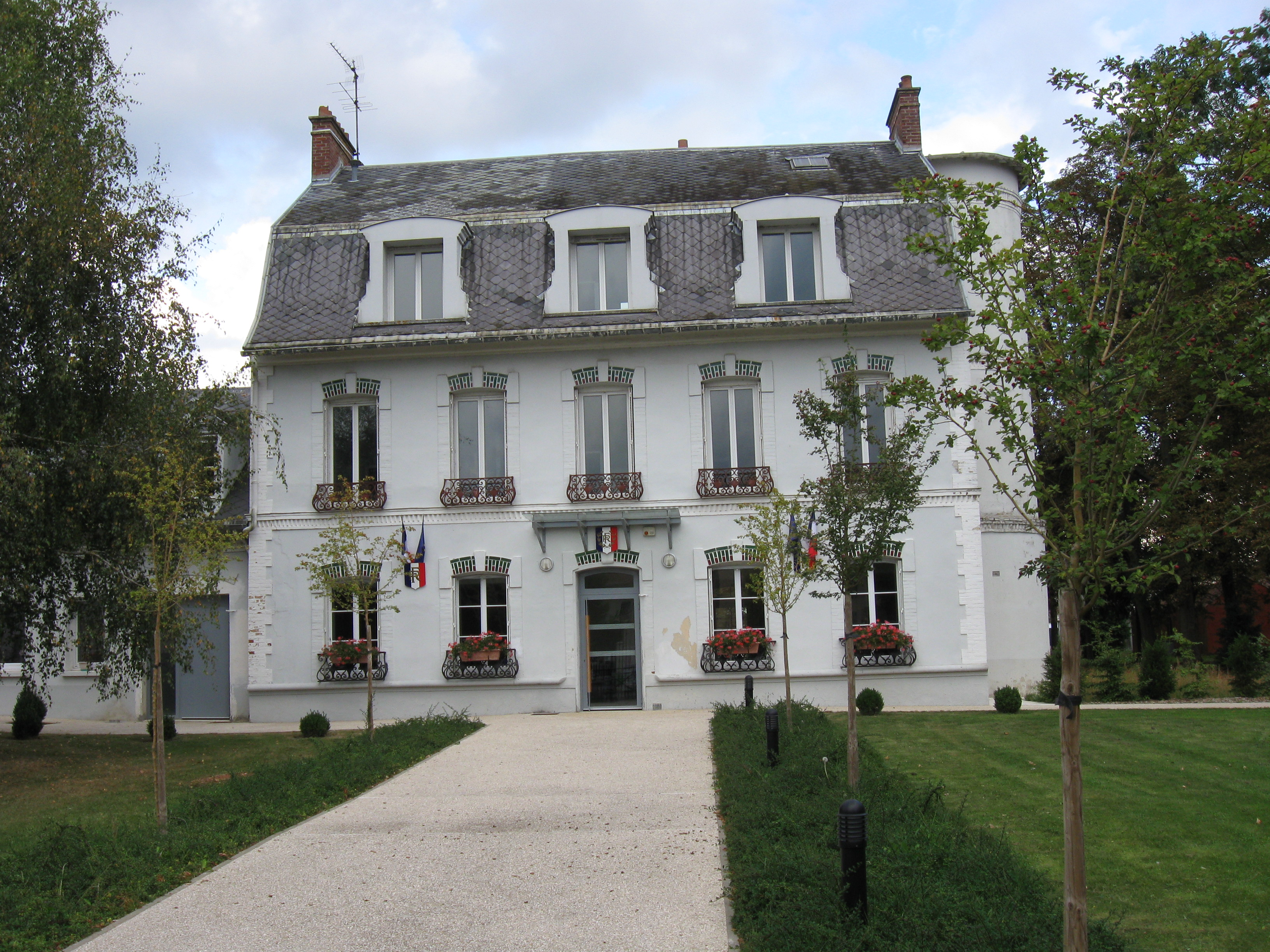
- The town hall in Vignely
- Location of Vignely
- Location within France Location within Île-de-France (region)
- Coordinates: 48°55′51″N 2°48′36″E
- Country: France
- Region: Île-de-France
- Department: Seine-et-Marne
- Arrondissement: Meaux
- Canton: Claye-Souilly
- Intercommunality: Pays de Meaux

Government
  - Mayor (2020–2026): Jean Piat
- Area^{1}: 3.58 km^{2} (1.38 sq mi)
- Highest elevation: 84 m (276 ft)
- Lowest elevation: 42 m (138 ft)
- Population (2023): 322
  - Density: 89.9/km^{2} (233/sq mi)
- Time zone: UTC+01:00 (CET)
  - Summer (DST): UTC+02:00 (CEST)
- INSEE/Postal code: 77498 /77450
- ^{1} French Land Register data, which excludes lakes, ponds, glaciers > 1 km^{2} (0.386 sq mi or 247 acres) and river estuaries.

Vignely (French pronunciation: [viɲli]) is a commune in the Seine-et-Marne department in the Île-de-France region in north-central France.

== Demographics ==
Inhabitants of Vignely are called Vigneliens.

== See also ==
- Communes of the Seine-et-Marne department
