= Monthyon =

- Commune
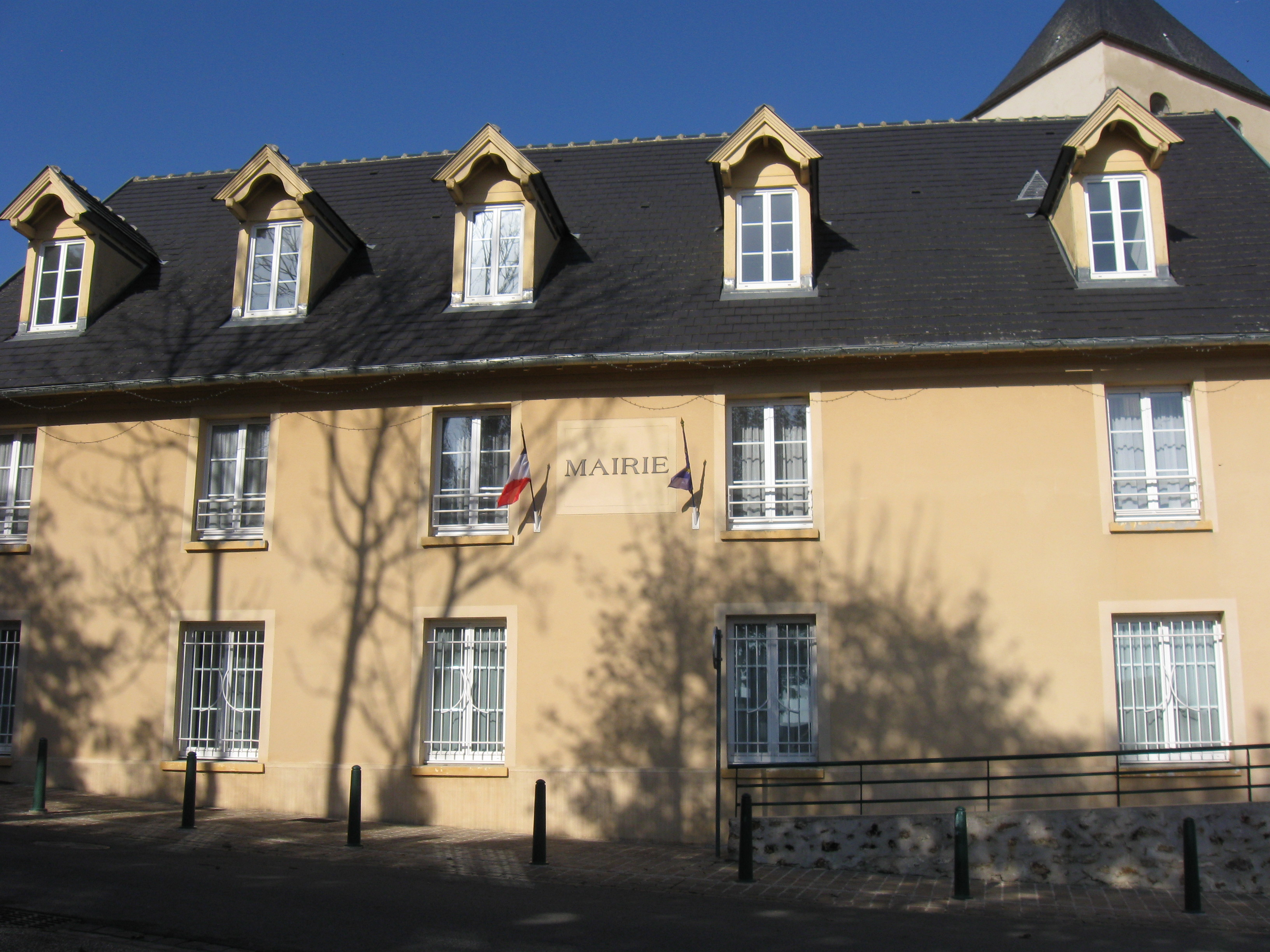
- The town hall in Monthyon

- Coat of arms
- Location of Monthyon
- Location within France Location within Île-de-France (region)
- Coordinates: 49°00′31″N 2°49′41″E
- Country: France
- Region: Île-de-France
- Department: Seine-et-Marne
- Arrondissement: Meaux
- Canton: Claye-Souilly
- Intercommunality: CA Pays de Meaux

Government
  - Mayor (2020–2026): Claude Decuypère
- Area^{1}: 12.11 km^{2} (4.68 sq mi)
- Highest elevation: 168 m (551 ft)
- Lowest elevation: 89 m (292 ft)
- Population (2023): 1,756
  - Density: 145.0/km^{2} (375.6/sq mi)
- Time zone: UTC+01:00 (CET)
  - Summer (DST): UTC+02:00 (CEST)
- INSEE/Postal code: 77309 /77122
- ^{1} French Land Register data, which excludes lakes, ponds, glaciers > 1 km^{2} (0.386 sq mi or 247 acres) and river estuaries.

Monthyon (French pronunciation: [mɔ̃tjɔ̃]) is a commune in the Seine-et-Marne department of the Île-de-France region in north-central France.

== Notable residents ==
The Belgian painter Eugène Boch lived in the Villa La Grimpette. In 1959, French actor Jean-Claude Brialy acquired a château in the commune; he lived there, with his partner, until he died in 2007.

== Demographics ==
From a population of 858 in 1975, Monthyon grew to 1,730 by 2018. The inhabitants of Monthyon are called Monthyonnais.

== See also ==
- Communes of the Seine-et-Marne department
