= Trilbardou =

- Commune
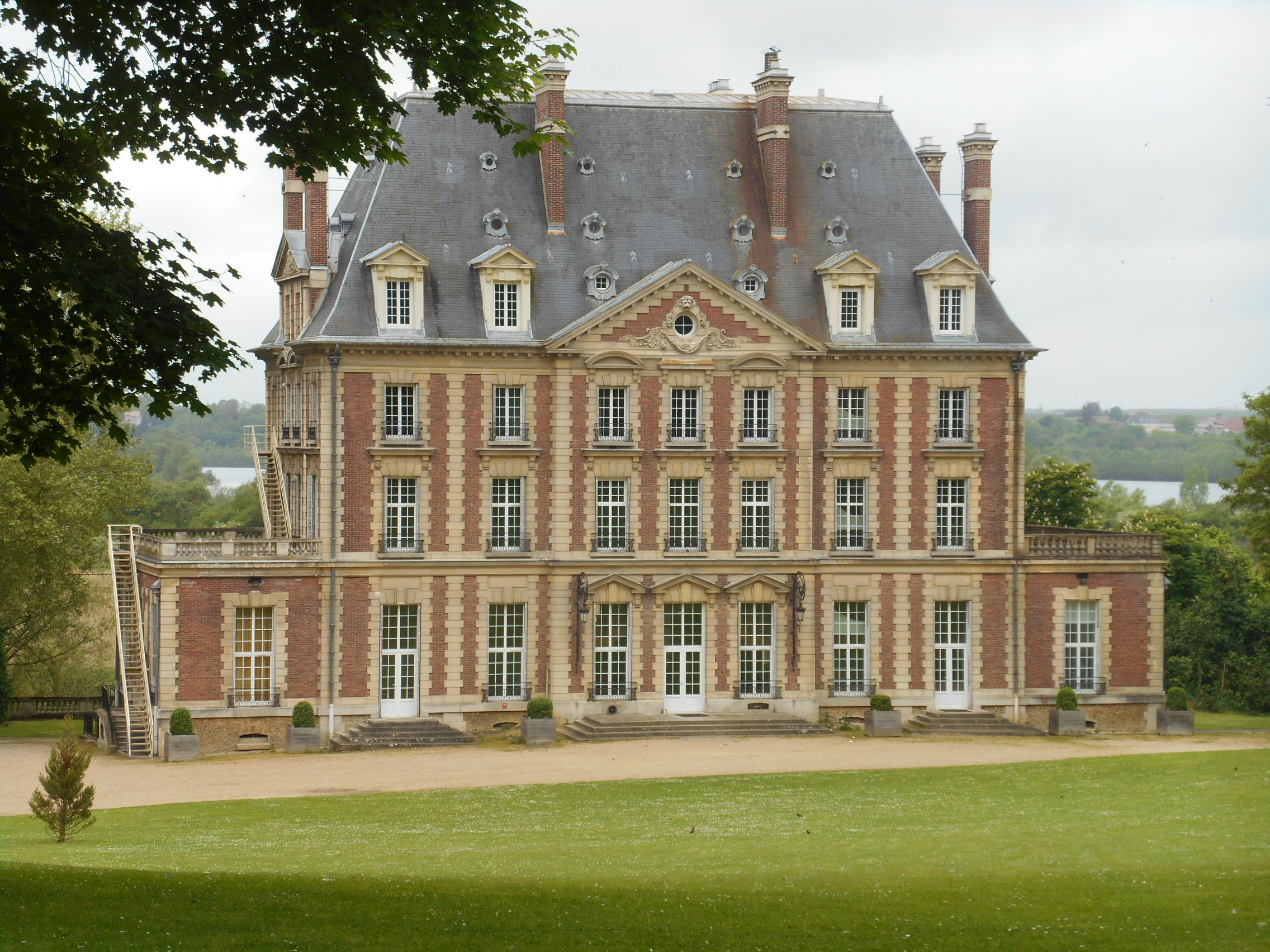
- Trilbardou castle

- Coat of arms
- Location of Trilbardou
- Location within France Location within Île-de-France (region)
- Coordinates: 48°56′33″N 2°48′21″E
- Country: France
- Region: Île-de-France
- Department: Seine-et-Marne
- Arrondissement: Meaux
- Canton: Claye-Souilly
- Intercommunality: Pays de Meaux

Government
  - Mayor (2021–2026): Romuald Jala
- Area^{1}: 7.95 km^{2} (3.07 sq mi)
- Highest elevation: 96 m (315 ft)
- Lowest elevation: 40 m (130 ft)
- Population (2023): 700
  - Density: 88/km^{2} (230/sq mi)
- Time zone: UTC+01:00 (CET)
  - Summer (DST): UTC+02:00 (CEST)
- INSEE/Postal code: 77474 /77450
- ^{1} French Land Register data, which excludes lakes, ponds, glaciers > 1 km^{2} (0.386 sq mi or 247 acres) and river estuaries.

Trilbardou (French: [tʁilbaʁdu]) is a commune in the Seine-et-Marne department in the Île-de-France region in north-central France. Inhabitants of Trilbardou are called Triboulois.

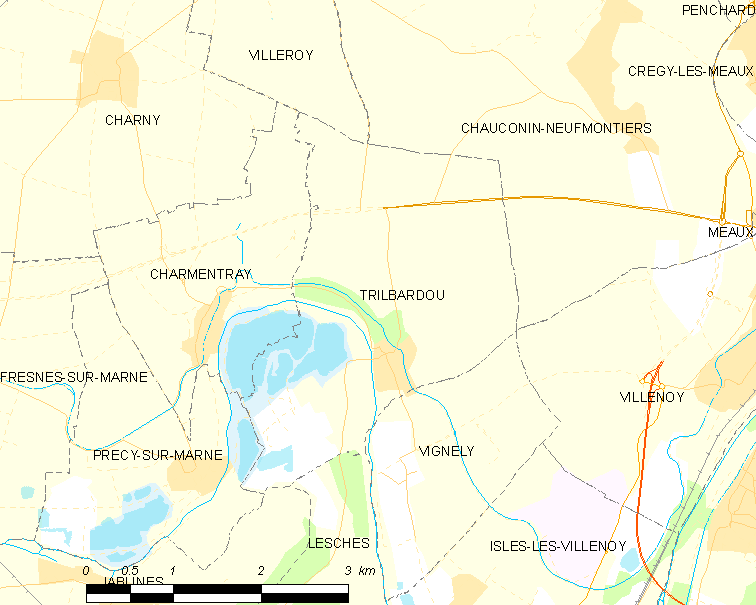
Trilbardou and surrounding communes

== See also ==
- Communes of the Seine-et-Marne department
