= Poincy =

- Commune
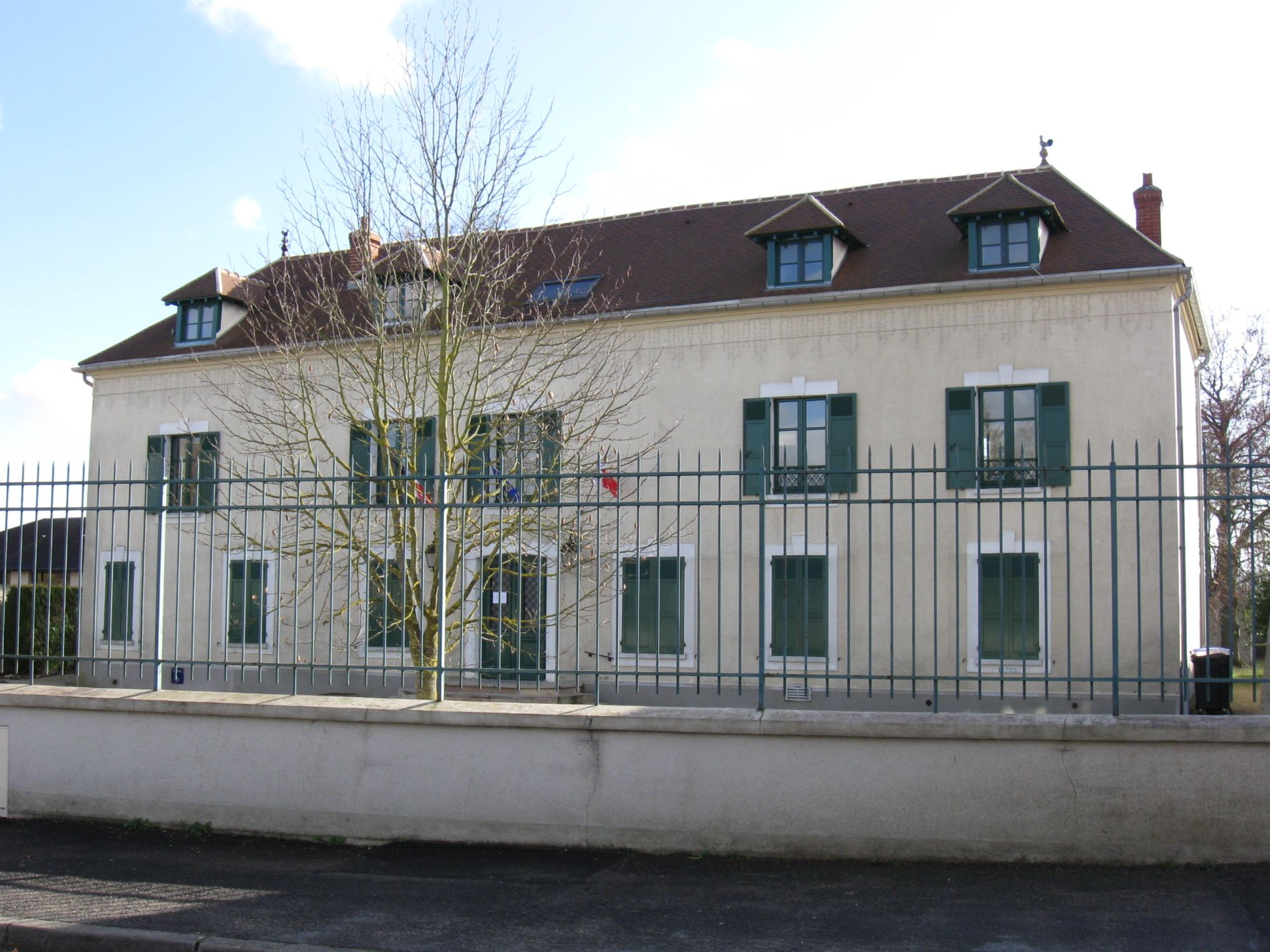
- The town hall in Poincy
- Location of Poincy
- Location within France Location within Île-de-France (region)
- Coordinates: 48°58′07″N 2°56′07″E
- Country: France
- Region: Île-de-France
- Department: Seine-et-Marne
- Arrondissement: Meaux
- Canton: La Ferté-sous-Jouarre
- Intercommunality: Pays de Meaux

Government
  - Mayor (2020–2026): Daniel Berthelin
- Area^{1}: 6.39 km^{2} (2.47 sq mi)
- Highest elevation: 112 m (367 ft)
- Lowest elevation: 41 m (135 ft)
- Population (2023): 797
  - Density: 125/km^{2} (323/sq mi)
- Time zone: UTC+01:00 (CET)
  - Summer (DST): UTC+02:00 (CEST)
- INSEE/Postal code: 77369 /77470
- ^{1} French Land Register data, which excludes lakes, ponds, glaciers > 1 km^{2} (0.386 sq mi or 247 acres) and river estuaries.

Poincy (French: [pwɛ̃si]) is a commune in the Seine-et-Marne department in the Île-de-France region in north-central France.

== Demographics ==
Inhabitants are called Pépitois.

== See also ==
- Communes of the Seine-et-Marne department
