= Varreddes =

- Commune
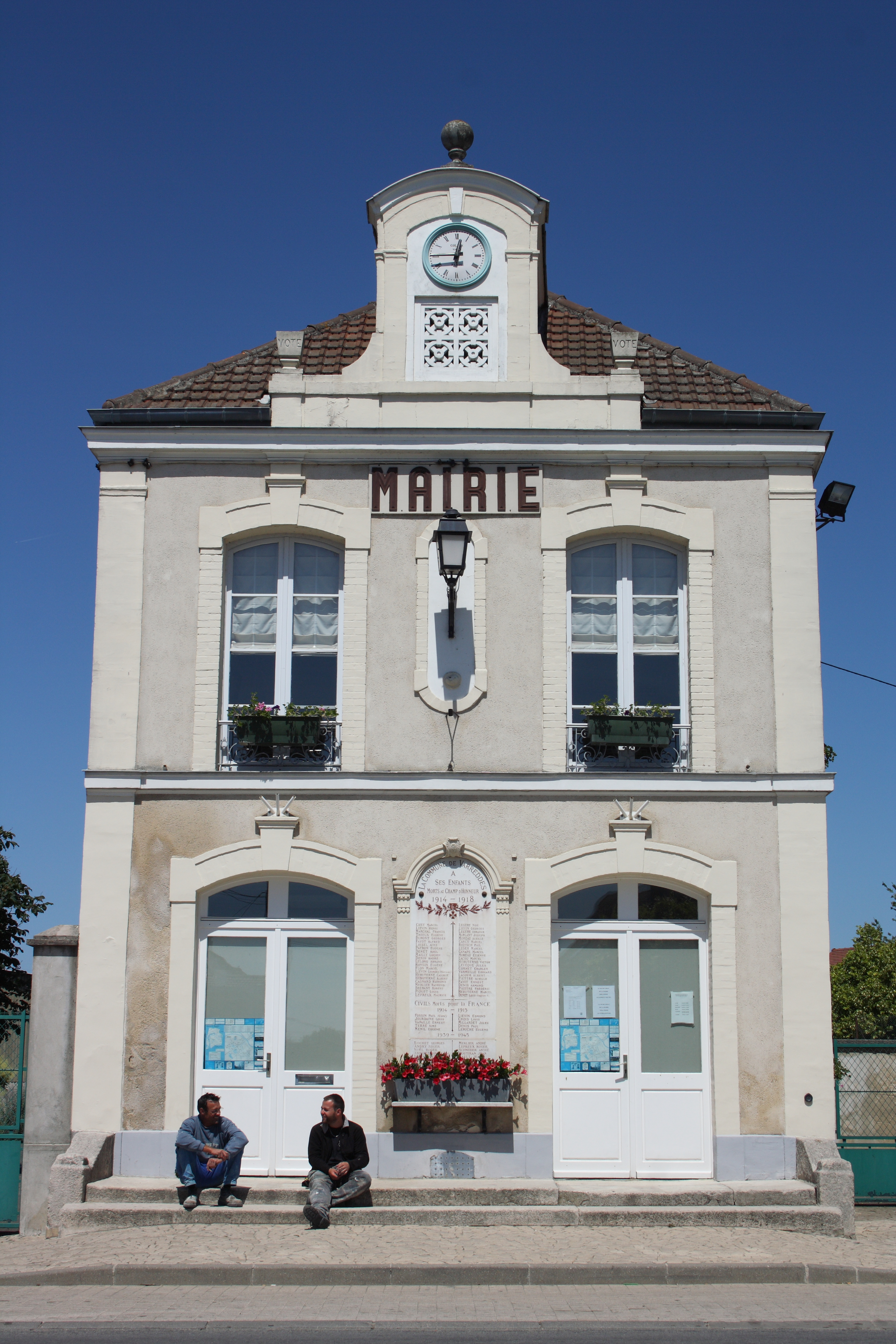
- The town hall in Varreddes
- Location of Varreddes
- Location within France Location within Île-de-France (region)
- Coordinates: 49°00′03″N 2°55′50″E
- Country: France
- Region: Île-de-France
- Department: Seine-et-Marne
- Arrondissement: Meaux
- Canton: Claye-Souilly
- Intercommunality: Pays de Meaux

Government
  - Mayor (2023–2026): Francis Messant
- Area^{1}: 8.00 km^{2} (3.09 sq mi)
- Highest elevation: 123 m (404 ft)
- Lowest elevation: 42 m (138 ft)
- Population (2023): 2,167
  - Density: 271/km^{2} (702/sq mi)
- Time zone: UTC+01:00 (CET)
  - Summer (DST): UTC+02:00 (CEST)
- INSEE/Postal code: 77483 /77910
- ^{1} French Land Register data, which excludes lakes, ponds, glaciers > 1 km^{2} (0.386 sq mi or 247 acres) and river estuaries.

Varreddes (French pronunciation: [vaʁɛd]) is a commune in the Seine-et-Marne department in the Île-de-France region in north-central France.

The American Monument, also called locally Monument de Varreddes, is located in Meaux on the road to Varreddes. The memorial includes La Liberté éplorée ("The Tearful Liberty"), a large figure by American sculptor Frederick William MacMonnies.

== Population ==
Historical population
Year	Pop.	±% p.a.
1968	1,004	—
1975	1,063	+0.82%
1982	1,110	+0.62%
1990	1,520	+4.01%
1999	1,810	+1.96%
2007	1,872	+0.42%
2012	1,856	−0.17%
2017	2,004	+1.55%
2023	2,167	+1.31%
Source: INSEE

Inhabitants of Varreddes are called Ravetons in French.

== See also ==
- Communes of the Seine-et-Marne department
