= Mareuil-lès-Meaux =

- Commune
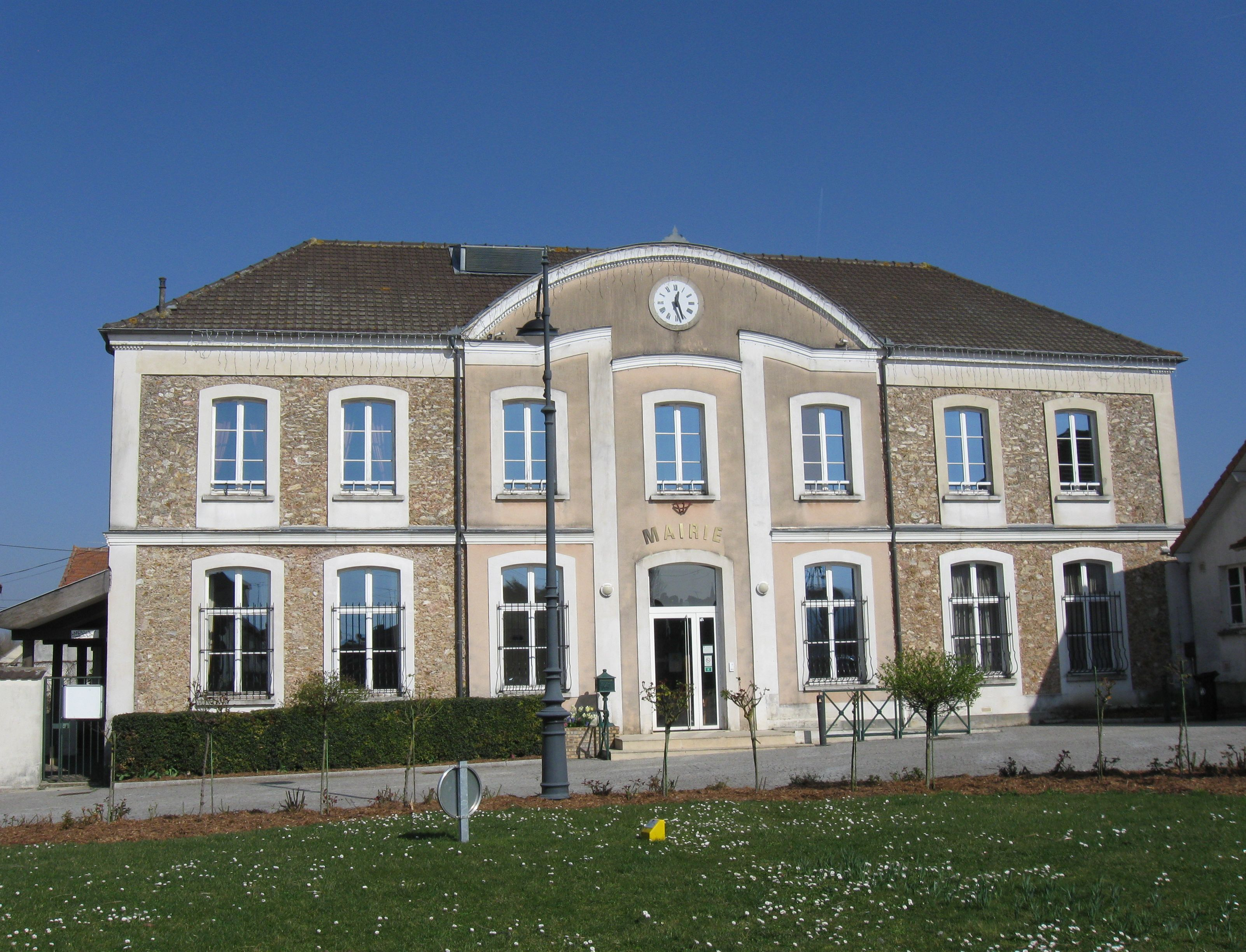
- The town hall in Mareuil-lès-Meaux

- Coat of arms
- Location of Mareuil-lès-Meaux
- Location within France Location within Île-de-France (region)
- Coordinates: 48°55′36″N 2°51′31″E
- Country: France
- Region: Île-de-France
- Department: Seine-et-Marne
- Arrondissement: Meaux
- Canton: Claye-Souilly
- Intercommunality: Pays de Meaux

Government
  - Mayor (2023–2026): Emilie Suray
- Area^{1}: 7.17 km^{2} (2.77 sq mi)
- Highest elevation: 138 m (453 ft)
- Lowest elevation: 42 m (138 ft)
- Population (2023): 3,345
  - Density: 467/km^{2} (1,210/sq mi)
- Time zone: UTC+01:00 (CET)
  - Summer (DST): UTC+02:00 (CEST)
- INSEE/Postal code: 77276 /77100
- ^{1} French Land Register data, which excludes lakes, ponds, glaciers > 1 km^{2} (0.386 sq mi or 247 acres) and river estuaries.

Mareuil-lès-Meaux (French pronunciation: [maʁœj lɛ mo], literally Mareuil near Meaux) is a commune in the Seine-et-Marne department in the Île-de-France region in north-central France.

== Population ==
Historical population
Year	Pop.	±% p.a.
1968	631	—
1975	767	+2.83%
1982	872	+1.85%
1990	1,163	+3.67%
1999	1,579	+3.46%
2007	1,947	+2.65%
2012	2,384	+4.13%
2017	3,108	+5.45%
2023	3,345	+1.23%
Source: INSEE

Inhabitants are called Mareuillois in French.

== See also ==
- Communes of the Seine-et-Marne department
