= Villenoy =

- Commune
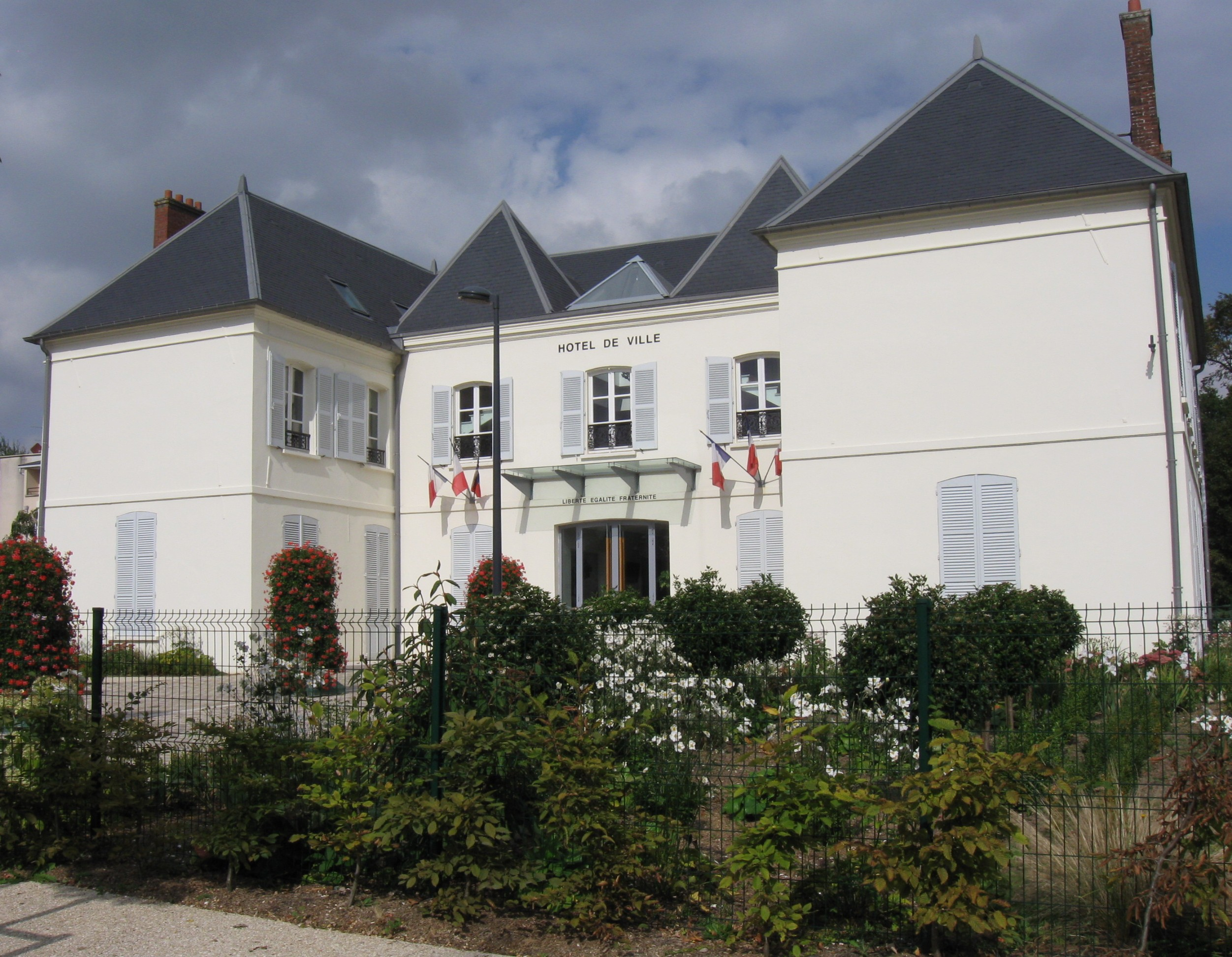
- The town hall in Villenoy
- Location of Villenoy
- Location within France Location within Île-de-France (region)
- Coordinates: 48°56′36″N 2°51′49″E
- Country: France
- Region: Île-de-France
- Department: Seine-et-Marne
- Arrondissement: Meaux
- Canton: Claye-Souilly
- Intercommunality: Pays de Meaux

Government
  - Mayor (2020–2026): Emmanuel Hude
- Area^{1}: 7.37 km^{2} (2.85 sq mi)
- Highest elevation: 85 m (279 ft)
- Lowest elevation: 42 m (138 ft)
- Population (2023): 5,127
  - Density: 696/km^{2} (1,800/sq mi)
- Time zone: UTC+01:00 (CET)
  - Summer (DST): UTC+02:00 (CEST)
- INSEE/Postal code: 77513 /77124
- ^{1} French Land Register data, which excludes lakes, ponds, glaciers > 1 km^{2} (0.386 sq mi or 247 acres) and river estuaries.

Villenoy (French: [vilnwa]) is a commune in the Seine-et-Marne department in the Île-de-France region in north-central France.

== Population ==
Historical population
Year	Pop.	±% p.a.
1968	1,860	—
1975	1,895	+0.27%
1982	2,423	+3.57%
1990	2,719	+1.45%
1999	3,542	+2.98%
2007	4,039	+1.65%
2012	4,168	+0.63%
2017	4,903	+3.30%
2023	5,127	+0.75%
Source: INSEE

Inhabitants of Villenoy are called Villenoyens in French.

== See also ==
- Communes of the Seine-et-Marne department
