= Forfry =

- Commune
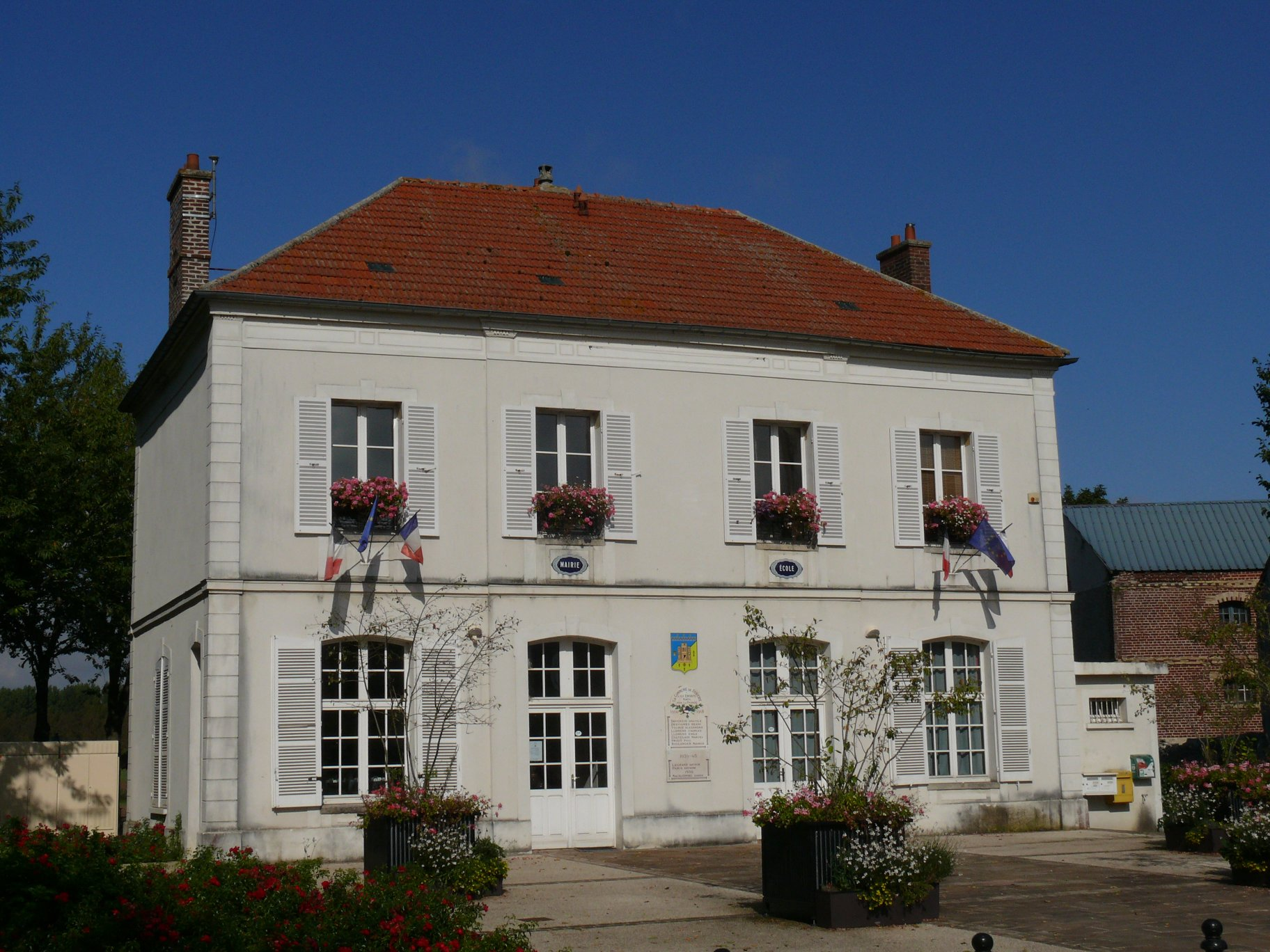
- The town hall in Forfry
- Location of Forfry
- Location within France Location within Île-de-France (region)
- Coordinates: 49°03′27″N 2°50′52″E
- Country: France
- Region: Île-de-France
- Department: Seine-et-Marne
- Arrondissement: Meaux
- Canton: Claye-Souilly
- Intercommunality: CA Pays de Meaux

Government
  - Mayor (2020–2026): Alain Bon
- Area^{1}: 5.80 km^{2} (2.24 sq mi)
- Highest elevation: 111 m (364 ft)
- Lowest elevation: 75 m (246 ft)
- Population (2023): 238
  - Density: 41.0/km^{2} (106/sq mi)
- Time zone: UTC+01:00 (CET)
  - Summer (DST): UTC+02:00 (CEST)
- INSEE/Postal code: 77193 /77165
- ^{1} French Land Register data, which excludes lakes, ponds, glaciers > 1 km^{2} (0.386 sq mi or 247 acres) and river estuaries.

Forfry (French pronunciation: [fɔʁfʁi]) is a commune in the Seine-et-Marne department in the Île-de-France region in north-central France.

== See also ==
- Communes of the Seine-et-Marne department
