= Gesvres-le-Chapitre =

- Commune
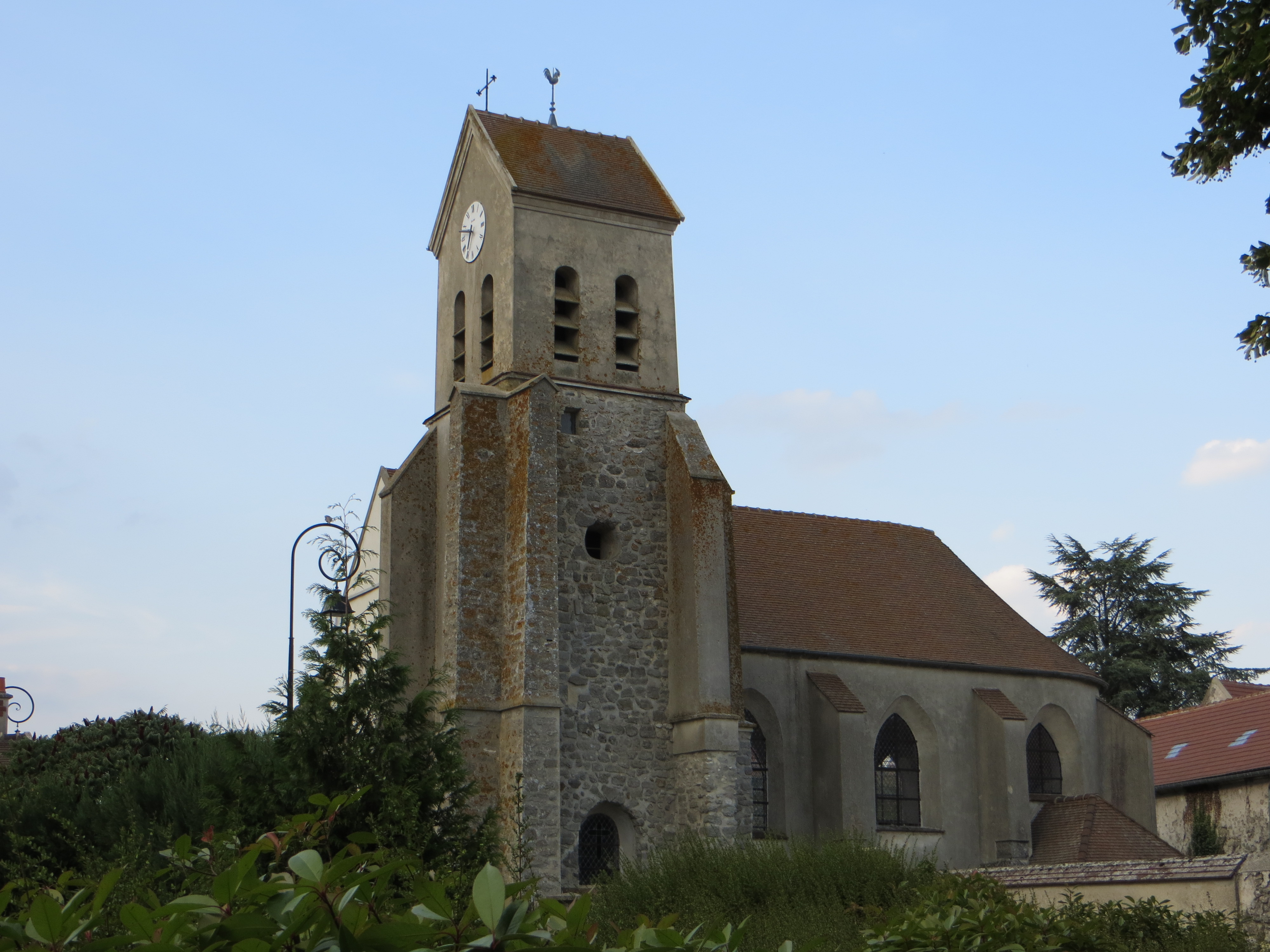
- The church in Gesvres-le-Chapitre
- Location of Gesvres-le-Chapitre
- Location within France Location within Île-de-France (region)
- Coordinates: 49°02′38″N 2°51′08″E
- Country: France
- Region: Île-de-France
- Department: Seine-et-Marne
- Arrondissement: Meaux
- Canton: Claye-Souilly
- Intercommunality: CA Pays de Meaux

Government
  - Mayor (2020–2026): Laurent Courtier
- Area^{1}: 4.23 km^{2} (1.63 sq mi)
- Highest elevation: 118 m (387 ft)
- Lowest elevation: 95 m (312 ft)
- Population (2023): 145
  - Density: 34.3/km^{2} (88.8/sq mi)
- Time zone: UTC+01:00 (CET)
  - Summer (DST): UTC+02:00 (CEST)
- INSEE/Postal code: 77205 /77165
- ^{1} French Land Register data, which excludes lakes, ponds, glaciers > 1 km^{2} (0.386 sq mi or 247 acres) and river estuaries.

Gesvres-le-Chapitre (French pronunciation: [ʒɛvʁ lə ʃapitʁ]) is a commune in the Seine-et-Marne department in the Île-de-France region in north-central France.

== Demographics ==
Inhabitants are called Gesvrois.

== See also ==
- Communes of the Seine-et-Marne department
