= Penchard =

- Commune
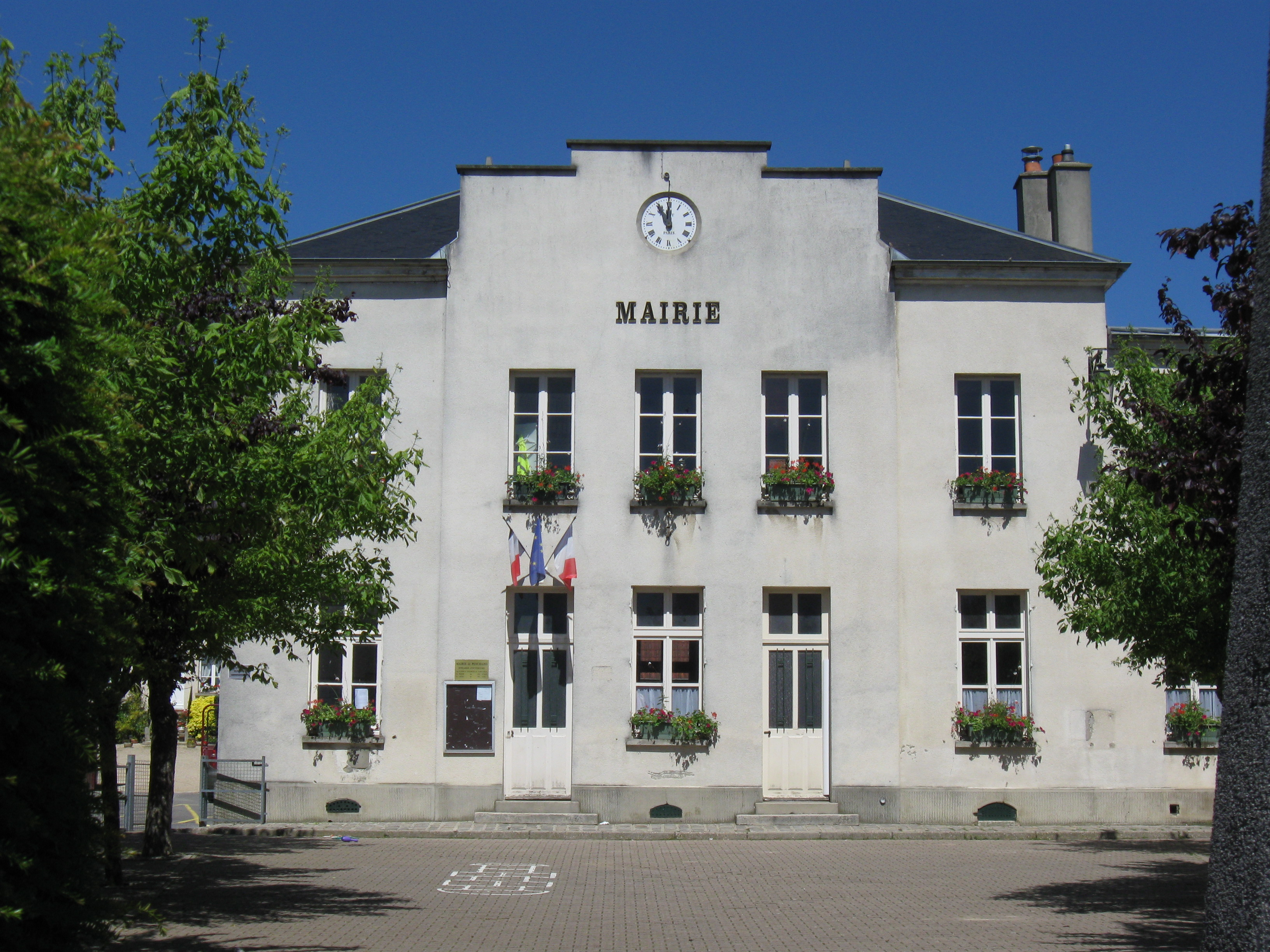
- The town hall in Penchard

- Coat of arms
- Location of Penchard
- Location within France Location within Île-de-France (region)
- Coordinates: 48°59′11″N 2°51′39″E
- Country: France
- Region: Île-de-France
- Department: Seine-et-Marne
- Arrondissement: Meaux
- Canton: Claye-Souilly
- Intercommunality: Pays de Meaux

Government
  - Mayor (2020–2026): Marc Rouquette
- Area^{1}: 4.34 km^{2} (1.68 sq mi)
- Highest elevation: 158 m (518 ft)
- Lowest elevation: 98 m (322 ft)
- Population (2023): 1,373
  - Density: 316/km^{2} (819/sq mi)
- Time zone: UTC+01:00 (CET)
  - Summer (DST): UTC+02:00 (CEST)
- INSEE/Postal code: 77358 /77124
- ^{1} French Land Register data, which excludes lakes, ponds, glaciers > 1 km^{2} (0.386 sq mi or 247 acres) and river estuaries.

Penchard (French pronunciation: [pɑ̃ʃaʁ]) is a commune in Seine-et-Marne, a department in the Île-de-France region in north-central France.

== Demographics ==
Inhabitants are called Penchardais.

== See also ==
- Communes of the Seine-et-Marne department
