= Germigny-l'Évêque =

- Commune
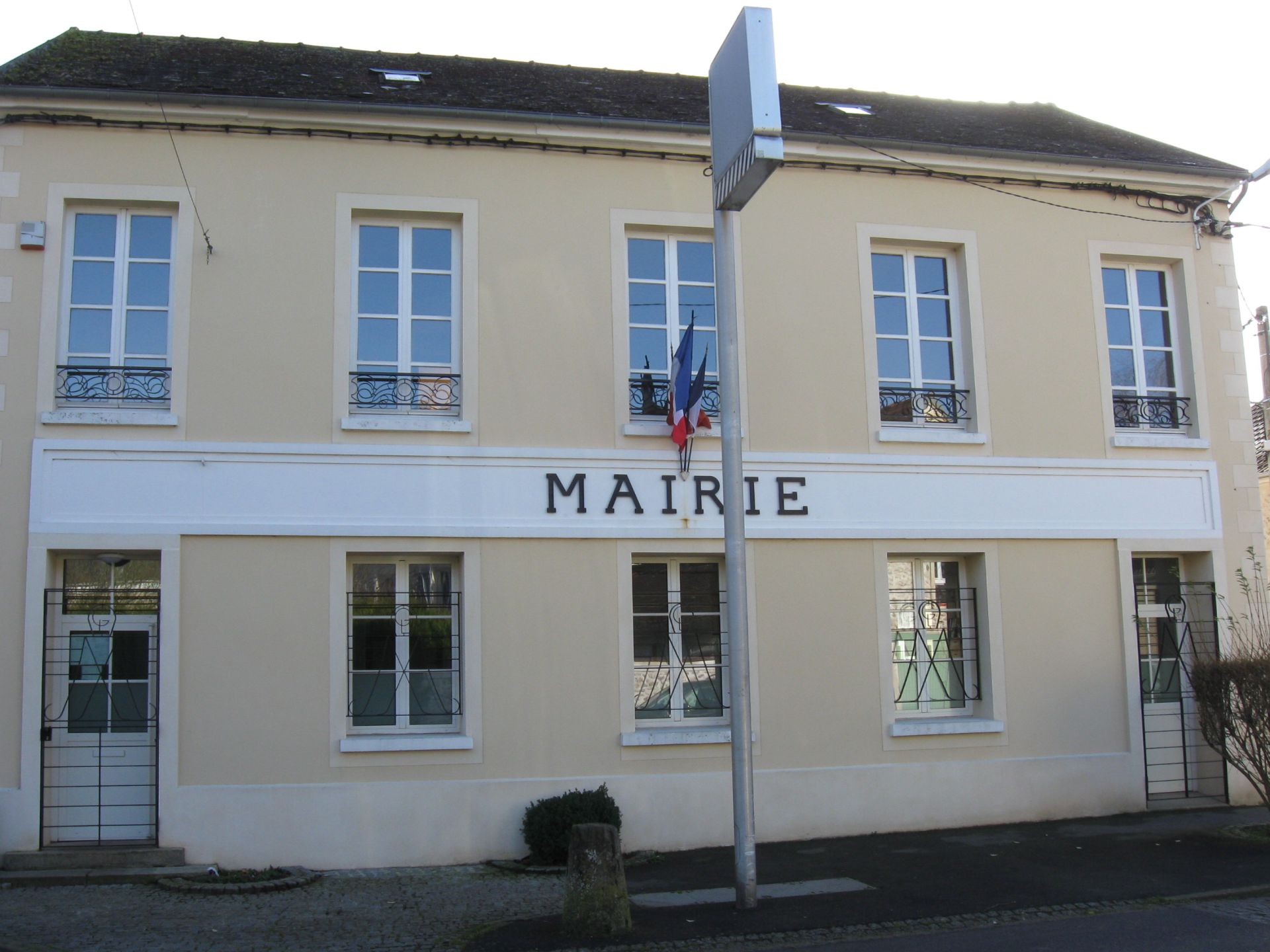
- Town hall of Germigny-l'Évêque
- Location of Germigny-l'Évêque
- Location within France Location within Île-de-France (region)
- Coordinates: 48°59′39″N 2°56′37″E
- Country: France
- Region: Île-de-France
- Department: Seine-et-Marne
- Arrondissement: Meaux
- Canton: La Ferté-sous-Jouarre
- Intercommunality: Pays de Meaux

Government
  - Mayor (2020–2026): Aline Marie-Mellare
- Area^{1}: 11.76 km^{2} (4.54 sq mi)
- Highest elevation: 104 m (341 ft)
- Lowest elevation: 42 m (138 ft)
- Population (2023): 1,352
  - Density: 115.0/km^{2} (297.8/sq mi)
- Time zone: UTC+01:00 (CET)
  - Summer (DST): UTC+02:00 (CEST)
- INSEE/Postal code: 77203 /77910
- ^{1} French Land Register data, which excludes lakes, ponds, glaciers > 1 km^{2} (0.386 sq mi or 247 acres) and river estuaries.

Germigny-l'Évêque (French: [ʒɛʁmini levɛk]) is a commune in the Seine-et-Marne department in the Île-de-France region in north-central France.

== Demographics ==
Inhabitants are called Germinois.

== Geography ==
Germigny-l'Évêque is located 9.5 km Northeast of Meaux on the left bank of the river Marne.

== See also ==
- Communes of the Seine-et-Marne department
