= Nanteuil-lès-Meaux =

- Commune
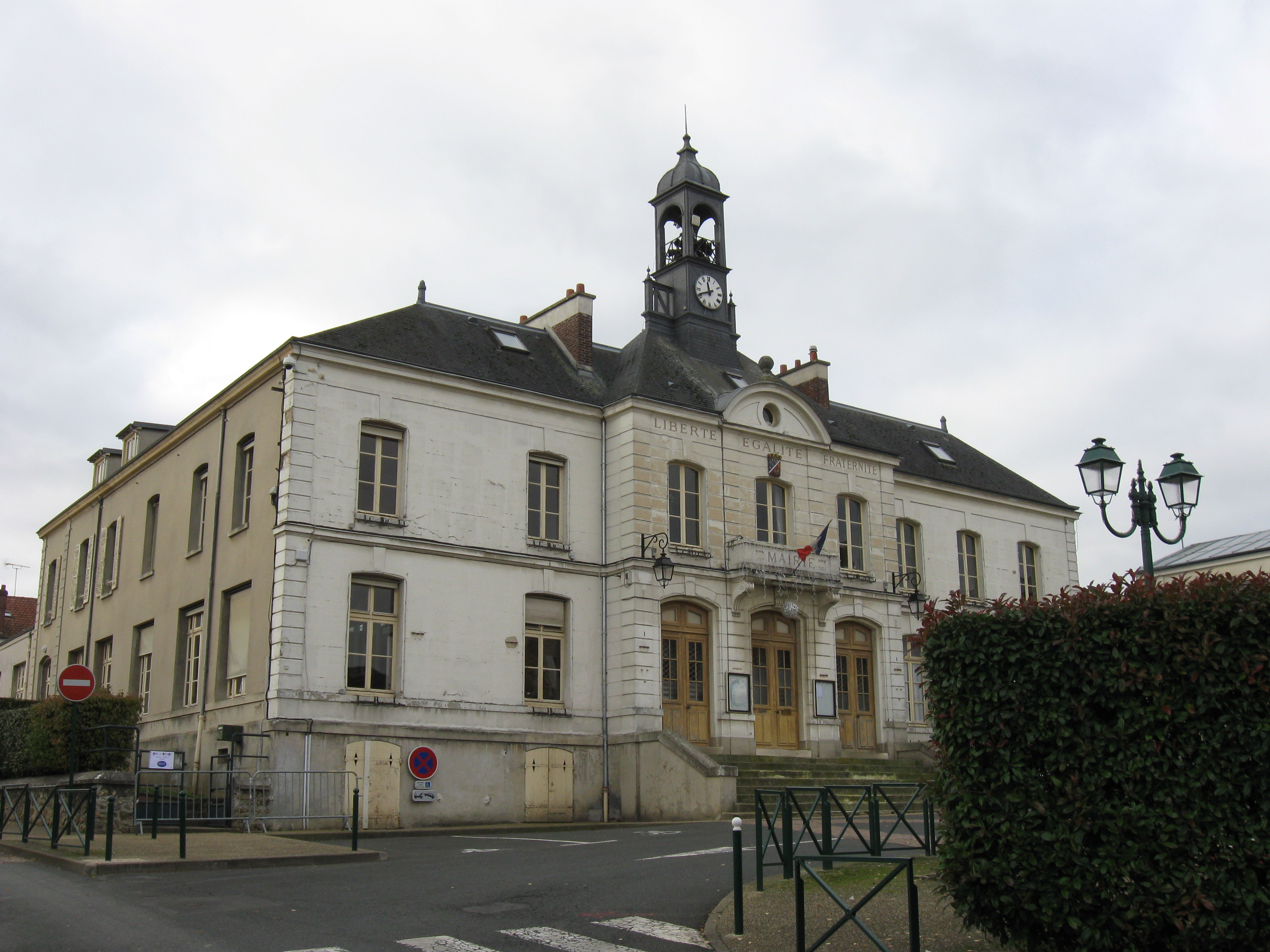
- The town hall in Nanteuil-lès-Meaux

- Coat of arms
- Location of Nanteuil-lès-Meaux
- Location within France Location within Île-de-France (region)
- Coordinates: 48°55′47″N 2°53′48″E
- Country: France
- Region: Île-de-France
- Department: Seine-et-Marne
- Arrondissement: Meaux
- Canton: La Ferté-sous-Jouarre
- Intercommunality: Pays de Meaux

Government
  - Mayor (2020–2026): Régis Sarazin
- Area^{1}: 7.62 km^{2} (2.94 sq mi)
- Highest elevation: 146 m (479 ft)
- Lowest elevation: 42 m (138 ft)
- Population (2023): 7,308
  - Density: 959/km^{2} (2,480/sq mi)
- Time zone: UTC+01:00 (CET)
  - Summer (DST): UTC+02:00 (CEST)
- INSEE/Postal code: 77330 /77100
- ^{1} French Land Register data, which excludes lakes, ponds, glaciers > 1 km^{2} (0.386 sq mi or 247 acres) and river estuaries.

Nanteuil-lès-Meaux (French pronunciation: [nɑ̃tœj lɛ mo], literally Nanteuil near Meaux) is a commune in the Seine-et-Marne department in the Île-de-France region in north-central France.

== Demographics ==
Inhabitants are called Nanteuillais in French.

Historical population
Year	Pop.	±% p.a.
1968	2,431	—
1975	2,828	+2.18%
1982	2,920	+0.46%
1990	4,339	+5.08%
1999	5,009	+1.61%
2007	5,316	+0.75%
2012	5,475	+0.59%
2017	6,160	+2.39%
2023	7,308	+2.89%
Source: INSEE

== See also ==
- Communes of the Seine-et-Marne department
