= Saint-Soupplets =

- Commune
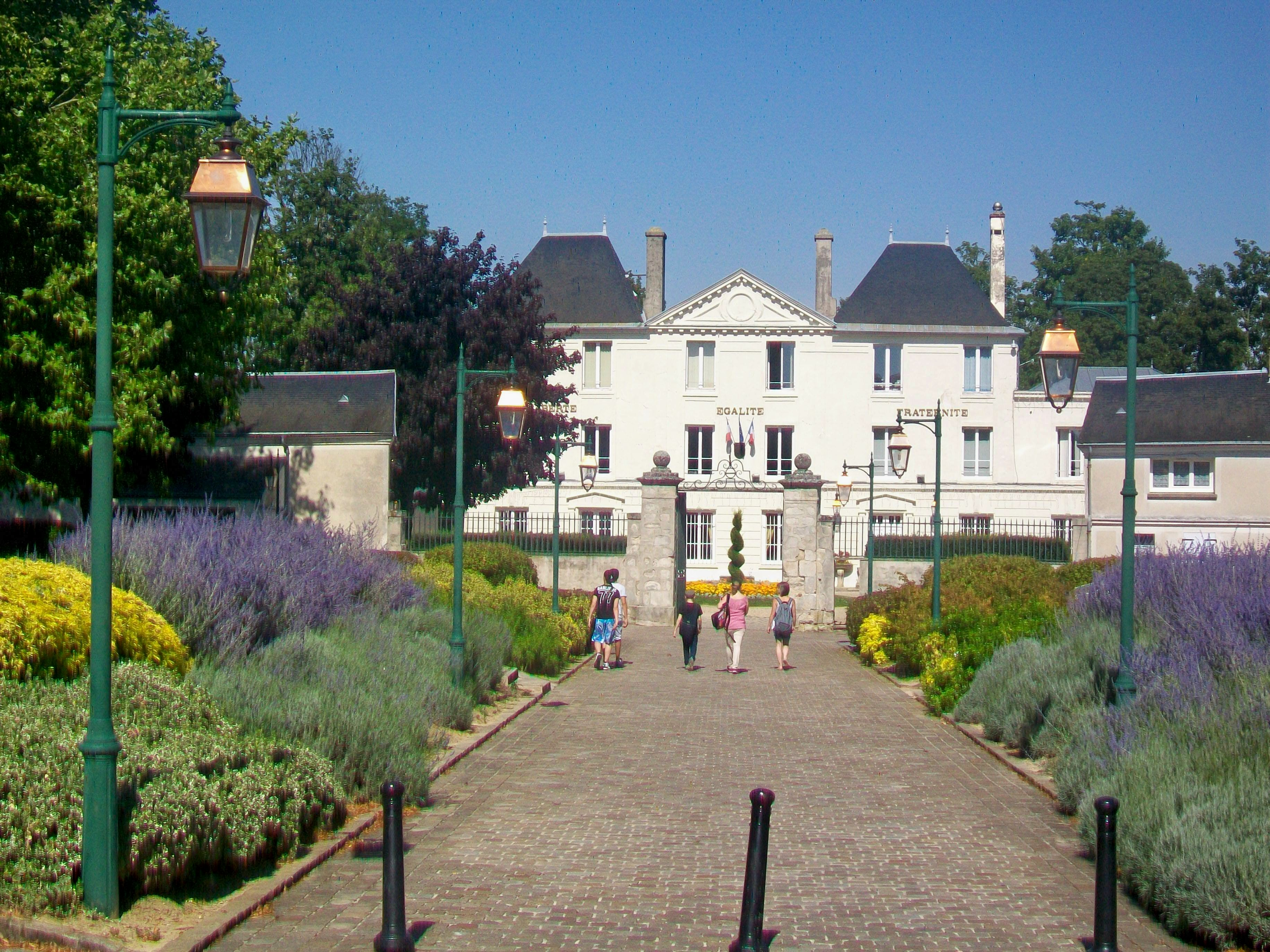
- The town hall in Saint-Soupplets

- Coat of arms
- Location of Saint-Soupplets
- Location within France Location within Île-de-France (region)
- Coordinates: 49°02′21″N 2°48′28″E
- Country: France
- Region: Île-de-France
- Department: Seine-et-Marne
- Arrondissement: Meaux
- Canton: Claye-Souilly
- Intercommunality: CA Pays de Meaux

Government
  - Mayor (2020–2026): Stéphane Devauchelle
- Area^{1}: 13.78 km^{2} (5.32 sq mi)
- Highest elevation: 179 m (587 ft)
- Lowest elevation: 88 m (289 ft)
- Population (2023): 3,542
  - Density: 257.0/km^{2} (665.7/sq mi)
- Time zone: UTC+01:00 (CET)
  - Summer (DST): UTC+02:00 (CEST)
- INSEE/Postal code: 77437 /77165
- ^{1} French Land Register data, which excludes lakes, ponds, glaciers > 1 km^{2} (0.386 sq mi or 247 acres) and river estuaries.

Saint-Soupplets (French pronunciation: [sɛ̃ suplɛ]) is a commune in the Seine-et-Marne department in the Île-de-France region in north-central France.

== Population ==
Historical population
Year	Pop.	±% p.a.
1968	757	—
1975	1,122	+5.78%
1982	2,008	+8.67%
1990	2,721	+3.87%
1999	2,890	+0.67%
2007	3,300	+1.67%
2012	3,238	−0.38%
2017	3,243	+0.03%
2023	3,542	+1.48%
Source: INSEE

Inhabitants of Saint-Soupplets are called Saint-Sulpiciens in French.

== See also ==
- Communes of the Seine-et-Marne department
