= Barcy =

- Commune
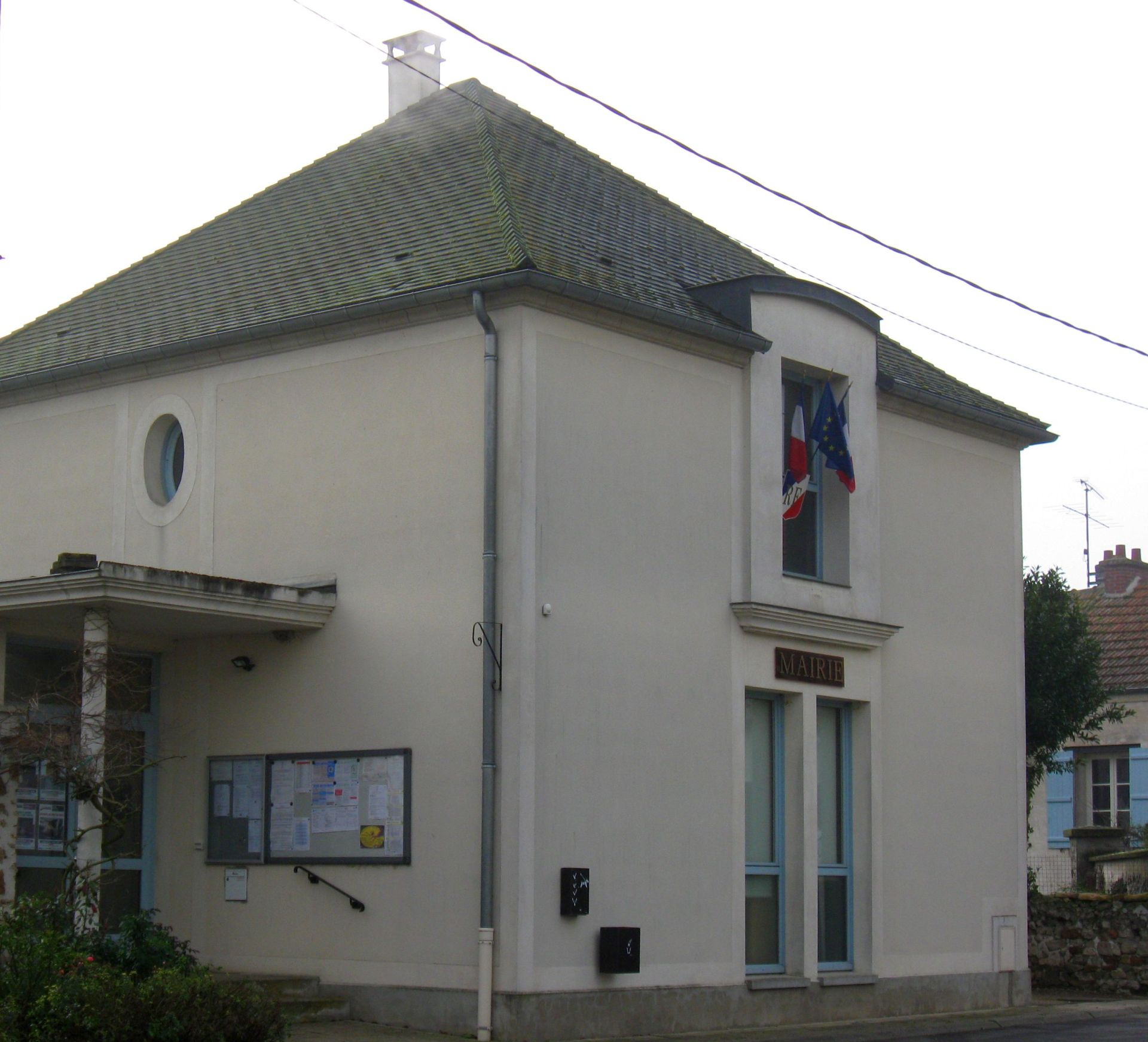
- The town hall in Barcy

- Coat of arms
- Location of Barcy
- Location within France Location within Île-de-France (region)
- Coordinates: 48°59′53″N 2°55′26″E
- Country: France
- Region: Île-de-France
- Department: Seine-et-Marne
- Arrondissement: Meaux
- Canton: Claye-Souilly
- Intercommunality: CA Pays de Meaux

Government
  - Mayor (2020–2026): Pierre-Edouard Dhuicque
- Area^{1}: 6.95 km^{2} (2.68 sq mi)
- Highest elevation: 160 m (520 ft)
- Lowest elevation: 86 m (282 ft)
- Population (2023): 387
  - Density: 55.7/km^{2} (144/sq mi)
- Time zone: UTC+01:00 (CET)
  - Summer (DST): UTC+02:00 (CEST)
- INSEE/Postal code: 77023 /77910
- ^{1} French Land Register data, which excludes lakes, ponds, glaciers > 1 km^{2} (0.386 sq mi or 247 acres) and river estuaries.

Barcy (French pronunciation: [baʁsi]) is a commune in the Seine-et-Marne department in the Île-de-France region in north-central France.

== Demographics ==
The inhabitants are called Barciens.

== See also ==
- Communes of the Seine-et-Marne department
