= Fublaines =

- Commune
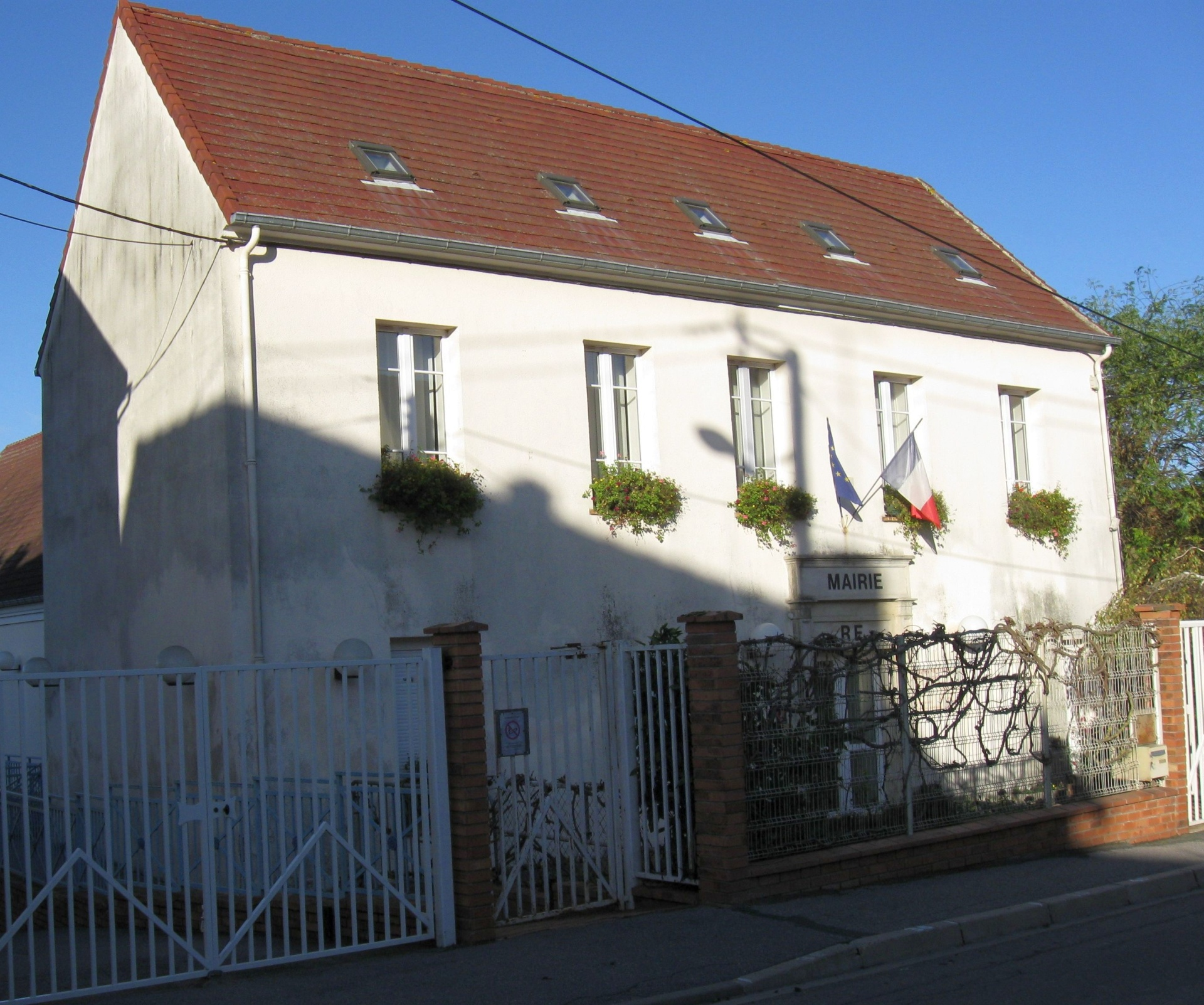
- The town hall in Fublaines

- Coat of arms
- Location of Fublaines
- Location within France Location within Île-de-France (region)
- Coordinates: 48°56′14″N 2°56′12″E
- Country: France
- Region: Île-de-France
- Department: Seine-et-Marne
- Arrondissement: Meaux
- Canton: La Ferté-sous-Jouarre
- Intercommunality: Pays de Meaux

Government
  - Mayor (2020–2026): Déborah Courtois
- Area^{1}: 5.48 km^{2} (2.12 sq mi)
- Highest elevation: 141 m (463 ft)
- Lowest elevation: 44 m (144 ft)
- Population (2023): 1,370
  - Density: 250/km^{2} (647/sq mi)
- Time zone: UTC+01:00 (CET)
  - Summer (DST): UTC+02:00 (CEST)
- INSEE/Postal code: 77199 /77470
- ^{1} French Land Register data, which excludes lakes, ponds, glaciers > 1 km^{2} (0.386 sq mi or 247 acres) and river estuaries.

Fublaines (French pronunciation: [fyblɛn]) is a commune in the Seine-et-Marne department in the Île-de-France region in north-central France.

== Demographics ==
Inhabitants of Fublaines are called Fublainois.

== See also ==
- Communes of the Seine-et-Marne department
