= Crégy-lès-Meaux =

- Commune
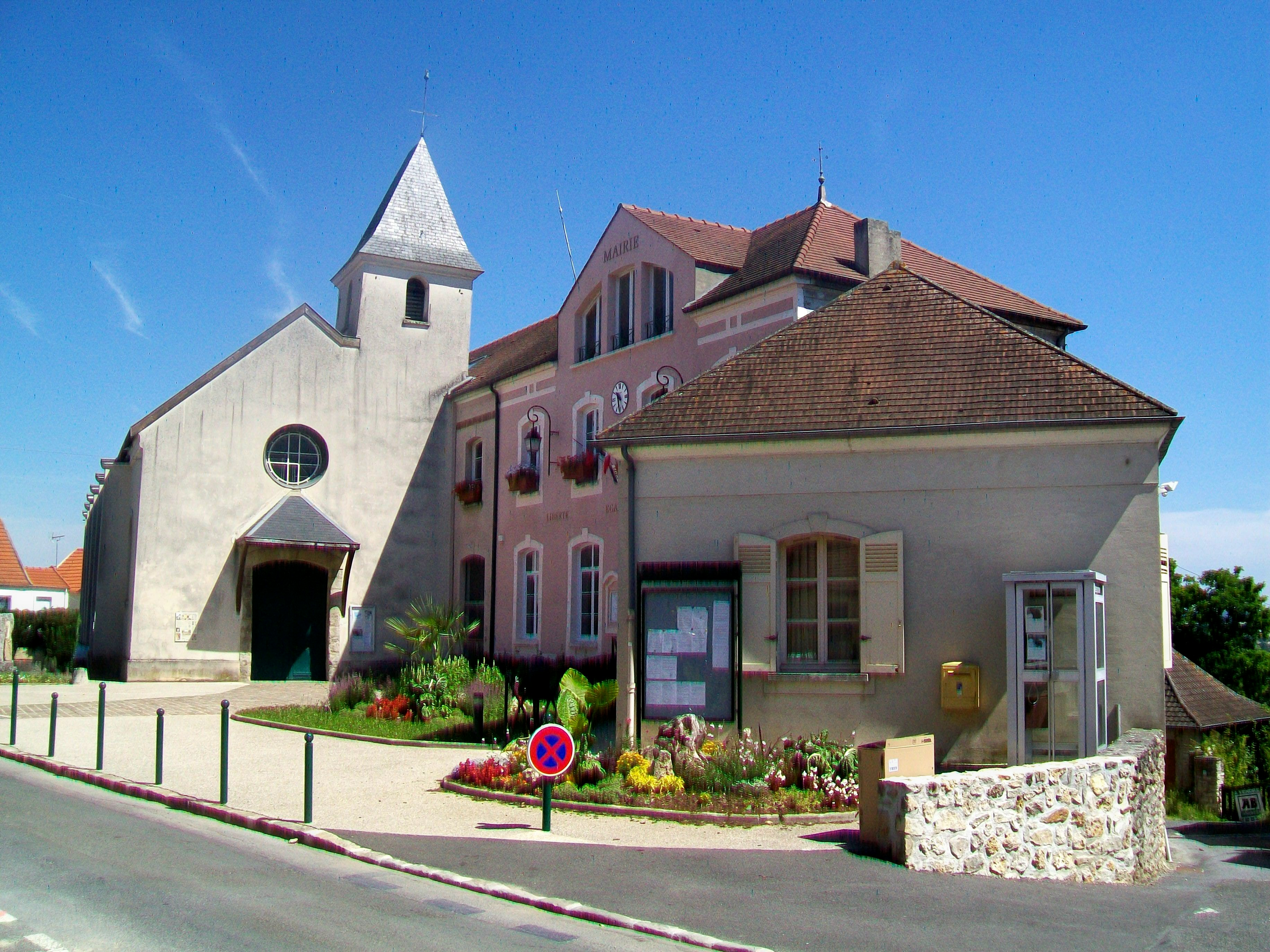
- The town hall and church in Crégy-lès-Meaux

- Coat of arms
- Location of Crégy-lès-Meaux
- Location within France Location within Île-de-France (region)
- Coordinates: 48°58′46″N 2°52′45″E
- Country: France
- Region: Île-de-France
- Department: Seine-et-Marne
- Arrondissement: Meaux
- Canton: Claye-Souilly
- Intercommunality: CA Pays de Meaux

Government
  - Mayor (2020–2026): Gérard Chomont
- Area^{1}: 3.67 km^{2} (1.42 sq mi)
- Highest elevation: 122 m (400 ft)
- Lowest elevation: 45 m (148 ft)
- Population (2023): 5,446
  - Density: 1,480/km^{2} (3,840/sq mi)
- Time zone: UTC+01:00 (CET)
  - Summer (DST): UTC+02:00 (CEST)
- INSEE/Postal code: 77143 /77124
- ^{1} French Land Register data, which excludes lakes, ponds, glaciers > 1 km^{2} (0.386 sq mi or 247 acres) and river estuaries.

Crégy-lès-Meaux (French: [kʁeʒi lɛ mo]) is a commune in the Seine-et-Marne department in the Île-de-France region in north-central France.

== Demographics ==
The inhabitants are called Crégyssois in French.

Historical population
Year	Pop.	±% p.a.
1968	793	—
1975	786	−0.13%
1982	1,007	+3.60%
1990	2,294	+10.84%
1999	3,677	+5.38%
2007	4,222	+1.74%
2012	4,533	+1.43%
2017	4,749	+0.94%
2023	5,446	+2.31%
Source: INSEE

== See also ==
- Communes of the Seine-et-Marne department
