= Chambry, Seine-et-Marne =

Chambry
- Commune
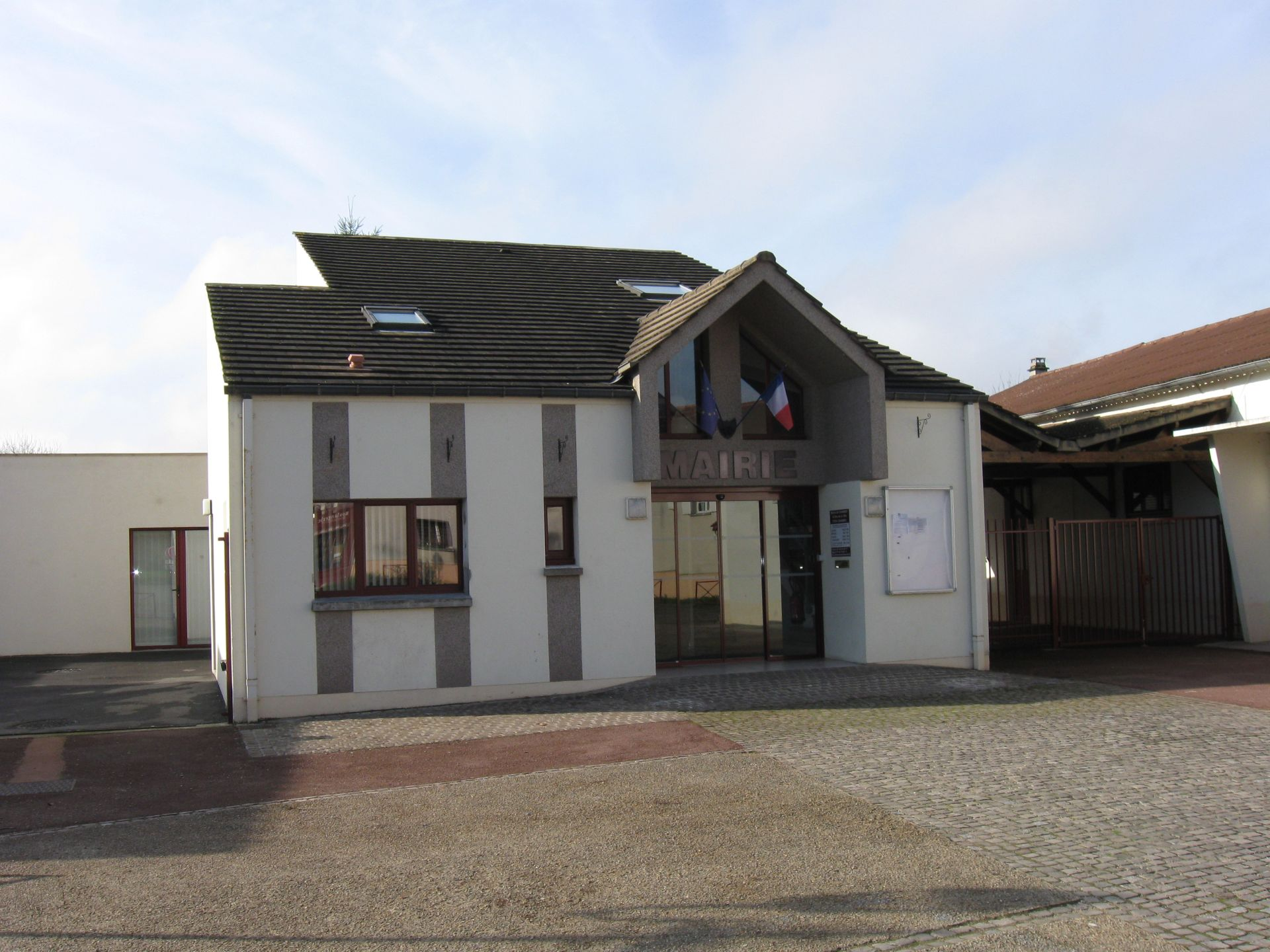
- The town hall in Chambry
- Location of Chambry
- Location within France Location within Île-de-France (region)
- Coordinates: 48°59′55″N 2°53′37″E
- Country: France
- Region: Île-de-France
- Department: Seine-et-Marne
- Arrondissement: Meaux
- Canton: Claye-Souilly
- Intercommunality: CA Pays de Meaux

Government
  - Mayor (2020–2026): Dominique Delahaye
- Area^{1}: 9.75 km^{2} (3.76 sq mi)
- Highest elevation: 160 m (520 ft)
- Lowest elevation: 71 m (233 ft)
- Population (2023): 1,064
  - Density: 109/km^{2} (283/sq mi)
- Time zone: UTC+01:00 (CET)
  - Summer (DST): UTC+02:00 (CEST)
- INSEE/Postal code: 77077 /77910
- ^{1} French Land Register data, which excludes lakes, ponds, glaciers > 1 km^{2} (0.386 sq mi or 247 acres) and river estuaries.

Chambry (French pronunciation: [ʃɑ̃bʁi]) is a commune in Seine-et-Marne, a department in Île-de-France, a region of France.

== Demographics ==
The inhabitants are called Chambryciens.

== See also ==
- Communes of the Seine-et-Marne department
