= Communauté de communes du Pays Fertois =

Coordinates: 48.95°N 3.13°E

Pays Fertois
- Former communauté de communes
- Country: France
- Region: Île-de-France
- Department: Seine-et-Marne
- No. of communes: {{{nbcomm}}}
- Established: 1970
- Disbanded: 2018
- Area: 209.66 km^{2} (80.95 sq mi)
- Population (2014): 28,904
  - Density: 137.86/km^{2} (357.06/sq mi)

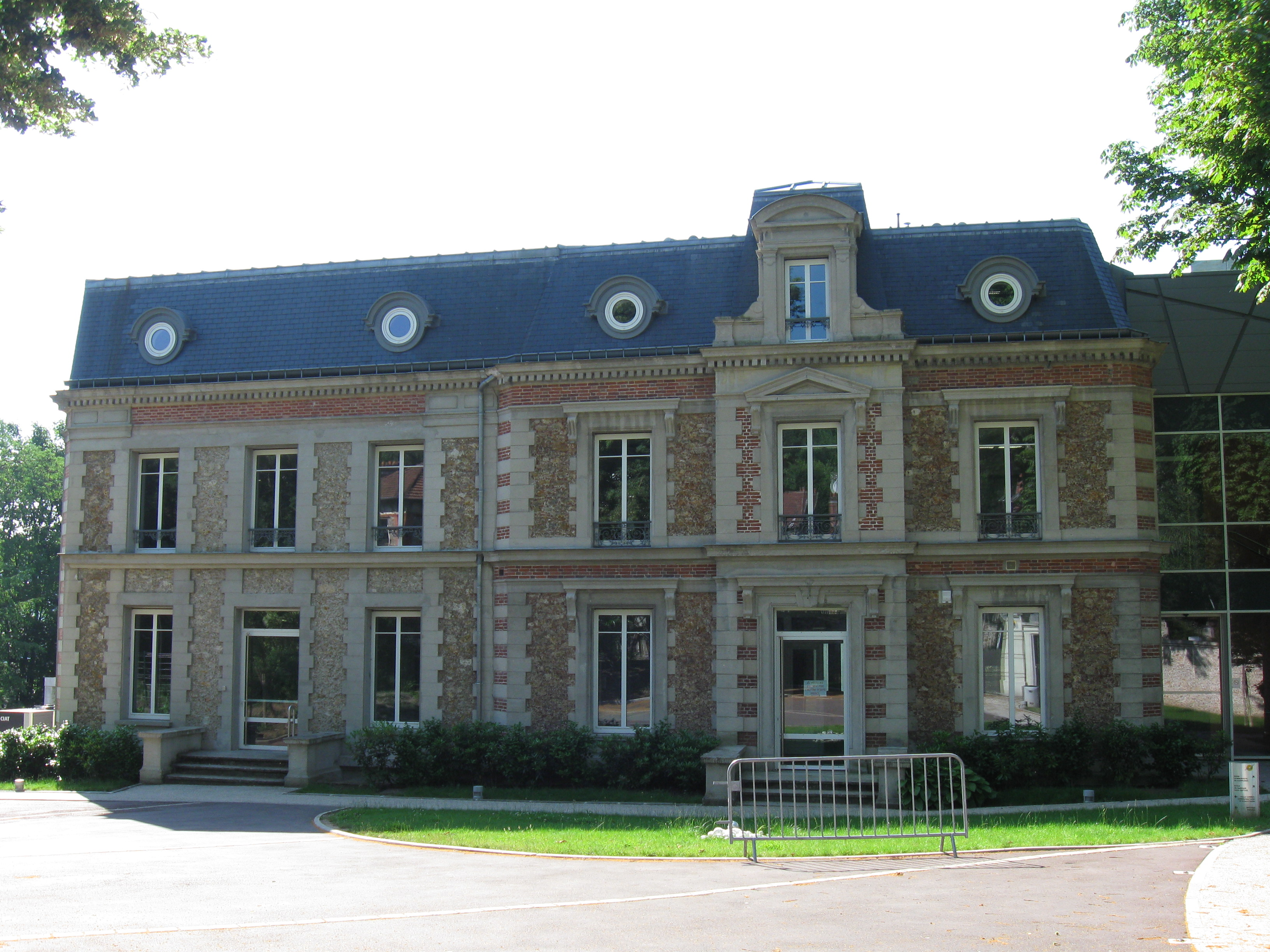
Headquarters of the Communauté de communes du Pays Fertois (La Ferté-sous-Jouarre, Seine-et-Marne department, Île-de-France region).

The Communauté de communes du Pays Fertois is a former federation of municipalities (communauté de communes) in the Seine-et-Marne département and in the Île-de-France région of France. It was created in June 1970. It was merged into the new Communauté d'agglomération Coulommiers Pays de Brie in January 2018.

== Composition ==
The communauté de communes consisted of the following 19 communes:

1. Bassevelle
2. Bussières
3. Chamigny
4. Changis-sur-Marne
5. Citry
6. Jouarre
7. La Ferté-sous-Jouarre
8. Luzancy
9. Méry-sur-Marne
10. Nanteuil-sur-Marne
11. Pierre-Levée
12. Reuil-en-Brie
13. Saâcy-sur-Marne
14. Sainte-Aulde
15. Saint-Jean-les-Deux-Jumeaux
16. Sammeron
17. Sept-Sorts
18. Signy-Signets
19. Ussy-sur-Marne

== See also ==
- Communes of the Seine-et-Marne department
