= Communauté de communes du Pays de Coulommiers =

Coordinates: 48.81°N 3.08°E

Pays de Coulommiers
- Former communauté de communes
- Interactive map of Pays de Coulommiers
- Country: France
- Region: Île-de-France
- Department: Seine-et-Marne
- No. of communes: {{{nbcomm}}}
- Established: January 2013
- Disbanded: 2018
- Area: 281 km^{2} (108 sq mi)
- Population (2013): 45,667
  - Density: 163/km^{2} (421/sq mi)

The Communauté de communes du Pays de Coulommiers is a former communauté de communes in the Seine-et-Marne département and in the Île-de-France région of France. It was created in January 2013 by the merger of the former Communauté de communes de la Brie des Templiers and the Communauté de communes Avenir et développement du secteur des Trois Rivières. In January 2017 it was joined by the communes of the former Communauté de communes de la Brie des Moulins. It was merged into the new Communauté d'agglomération Coulommiers Pays de Brie in January 2018.

== Composition ==
The communauté de communes consisted of the following 24 communes:

1. Amillis
2. Aulnoy
3. Beautheil
4. Boissy-le-Châtel
5. La Celle-sur-Morin
6. Chailly-en-Brie
7. Chauffry
8. Chevru
9. Coulommiers
10. Dagny
11. Dammartin-sur-Tigeaux
12. Faremoutiers
13. Giremoutiers
14. Guérard
15. Hautefeuille
16. Maisoncelles-en-Brie
17. Marolles-en-Brie
18. Mauperthuis
19. Mouroux
20. Pézarches
21. Pommeuse
22. Saint-Augustin
23. Saints
24. Touquin

== See also ==
- Communes of the Seine-et-Marne department
