= Communauté de communes Avenir et développement du secteur des Trois Rivières =

Coordinates: 48.789°N 3.125°E

Avenir et développement du secteur des Trois Rivières
- Former communauté de communes
- Interactive map of Avenir et développement du secteur des Trois Rivières
- Country: France
- Region: Île-de-France
- Department: Seine-et-Marne
- No. of communes: {{{nbcomm}}}
- Established: 1993
- Disbanded: 2013
- Area: 100.38 km^{2} (38.76 sq mi)
- Population (1999): 5,903
  - Density: 58.81/km^{2} (152.3/sq mi)

The Communauté de communes Avenir et développement du secteur des Trois Rivières is a former communauté de communes in the Seine-et-Marne département and in the Île-de-France région of France. It was established on 10 December 1993. It was merged into the new Communauté de communes du Pays de Coulommiers in January 2013.

== Composition ==
The Communauté de communes comprised the following communes:

- Amillis
- Beautheil
- Chailly-en-Brie
- Dagny
- Marolles-en-Brie
- Mauperthuis
- Saints
- Touquin

== See also ==
- Communes of the Seine-et-Marne department
