= Communauté de communes de la Brie des Moulins =

Coordinates: 48.8162°N 3.0159°E

la Brie des Moulins
- Former communauté de communes
- Interactive map of la Brie des Moulins
- Country: France
- Region: Île-de-France
- Department: Seine-et-Marne
- No. of communes: {{{nbcomm}}}
- Established: August 1997
- Disbanded: 2017
- Area: 52.45 km^{2} (20.25 sq mi)
- Population (1999): 7,613
  - Density: 145.1/km^{2} (375.9/sq mi)

The Communauté de communes de la Brie des Moulins is a former federation of municipalities (communauté de communes) in the Seine-et-Marne département and in the Île-de-France région of France. It was created in August 1997. It was merged into the Communauté de communes du Pays de Coulommiers in January 2017.

The Communauté de communes comprised the following communes:

- Dammartin-sur-Tigeaux
- Faremoutiers
- Guérard
- Pommeuse

== See also ==
- Communes of the Seine-et-Marne department
