= Fernand Sabatté =

French painter

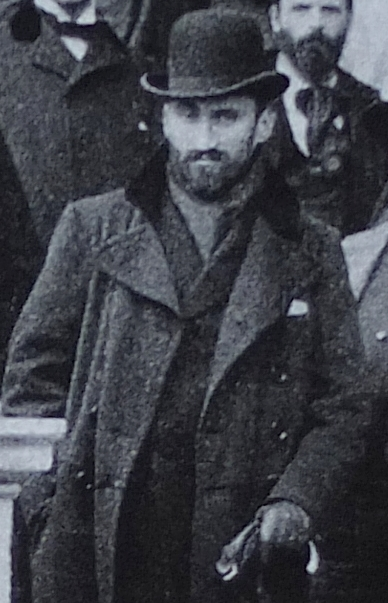
- Born: Fernand Sabatté; 14 May 1874; Aiguillon, Lot-et-Garonne, France
- Died: 22 October 1940 (aged 66); Chamigny
- Known for: Architectural painting and sculptor, war artist, and French army officer responsible for salvaging artefacts in World War One

Fernand Sabatté was a French painter and sculptor who is best known for his architectural painting and portrait work, as well as salvaging church monuments and bombed out churches in the zone rouge during World War I.

== Early life ==
He was born in Aiguillon, Lot-et-Garonne 14 May 1874. Sabatté's parents separated in 1880 and he moved with his mother to Bordeaux. Having studied at the École des Beaux-Arts, in 1893 he began working there in the studio of Gustave Moreau. At his first exhibition at the Paris Salon, a portrait of his grandmother was purchased by the state.

== Artistic career and recognition ==
In 1900 he won the Grand Prix de Rome for his painting Un Spartiate et l'Ilote. From 1926 he taught painting, first at the École des Beaux-Arts in Lille until 1929, then at the École des Beaux-Arts in Paris. His student Louise Cottin won a second prize of Rome in 1934. Also in 1929, he founded the bimonthly magazine Art. He entered the Academy of Fine Arts of the Institute of France in 1935 (painting section, chair 5). Viewed as an academic painter, who was heavily influenced by his religion, which has been described as bordering on mystical. He remained heavily influenced by his tutor Moreau, retaining a very realistic style of painting, only briefly experimenting with Impressionism. He is credited, amongst other Paris artists, as fostering a new generation of modern women artists. There is a street in his native Aiguillon named in his honour.

== Military career ==
During World War I Fernand Sabatté received the Croix de guerre and became a Chevalier (Knight) in the Legion of Honour. He was decorated for his services, while serving as an army officer, responsible for salvaging art works and sculptures from bombed-out towns in Northern France from 1916-1918, while simultaneously painting scenes of ruined churches and civic buildings, and can therefore be classed as a war artist. He held the rank and title of ‘Chef de la section du front du Nord du service de protection et d’évacuation des monuments et oeuvres d’art’. Today an extensive series of photographs featuring Sabatté shows the damaged buildings which his unit surveyed, today held at the Médiathèque de l’Architecture et du Patrimoine, Paris.

It is not known exactly when Sabatté enlisted with the French army, although a patriotic postcard sent to fellow ex alumni of the École des Beaux-Arts, now serving in the French army, is dated 1915. We know that he was appointed head of his unit, the Protection et d’évacuation des monuments et oeuvres d’art in October 1916.

== Salvaging damaged church artefacts in the Zone Rouge ==
The journal Le Bulletin de la vie artistique published in 1920, provides a concise history of his unit. It states that after the cataclysmic Battle of Verdun in 1916, the French government took proactive steps to evacuate art from the zone rouge, as well as salvage wrecked buildings, particularly churches, destroyed by artillery under the authorisation of L’administration des Beaux Arts. In October 1916 this unit was officially instituted with its orders to salvage artefacts and bring them to rear area depots, where rudimentary conservation work could be carried out. Divided into three sectors – Central (Argonne and Somme), East (Argonne and Swiss), and North (Somme and Belgium) – this third section was headed-up by Fernand Sabatté. Four depots were set up under his command; Chateau Martainville (Rouen), Chateau d’Eu (Dieppe), Abbeville and Arras. The following description of his salvaging work is extracted from the Bulletin de la Commission départementale des monuments historiques du Pas-de-Calais, 1920 and provides this connection.

Il convient surtout de nommer le lieutenant du génie Sabatté, chef du service des monuments et objets d'art de la zone des armées. Pendant la guerre, ce brave officier fit preuve d'un zèle et d'un courage au-dessus de tout éloge. Admirablement secondé par une équipe de soldats, spécialisés dans ce service, il procéda au sauvetage de nos oeuvres d'art jusque sous le feu de l'ennemi, au milieu des obus et des incendies. Et le Musée vraiment remarquable, installé par lui à Arras, dans un vaste hangar, autrefois salle de gymnastique, témoigne du succès de son intervention. En 1919, il n'a cessé de parcourir les villages dévastés, fouillant les décombres des églises; chaque jour son musée s'enrichissait de quelque statue, pierre tombale, cloche ou bénitier, rescapé au milieu des ruines.

It is worth mentioning Lieutenant of (Administrative) Engineering, Sabatté, Chief of the Monuments and Arts Service in the war zone. During the war this brave officer proved his zeal, courage and above all (deserves our) praise. Admirably assisted by a team of soldiers who specialised in this service, he proceeded to rescue our artworks even under enemy attack, (even) in the midst of shells and fires. And the truly remarkable Museum, established by him in Arras, in a large store, formerly a gymnasium, demonstrates the success of his intervention. In 1919, he continued to visit the devastated towns, searching the rubble of churches; and so every day the museum was enriched by some statue, stone tombstone, bell or font, survivors from the ruins.

== German frightfulness and apportioning war guilt ==
The bombardment of Arras, and the destruction of its medieval belfry, caused consternation in France and was utilised for propaganda purposes as an example of German Frightfulness or Schrecklichkeit. Approximately a dozen French and Belgian towns received bombardment by German artillery during World War One, including the Cathedral of Rheims, Library of Leuven, Soissons, Ypres, Mauberge and Arras, and these towns were referred to in contemporary press reports as the martyred towns (or Les villages détruits). The identity of Sabatté in this unit is established in a photograph listing his name during a ministerial visit to the depot at Abbeville on 26 July 1918. Sabatté's work continued into 1919. From photographs held at the Médiathèque de l’Architecture et du Patrimoine, it can be seen that his unit in Arras utilised German Prisoners of War, and this project is an outcome of the French government's determination to publicise German war guilt and to give evidence to its reparation payments.

== Painting war ruins ==
In 1916 he painted Intérieur de la cathédrale d’Arras en ruines, en 1916 (Collection Musée d’Orsay, Paris). In this painting he wrote an inscription at the lower right hand corner of the canvas, that his painting session was "interrupted by the explosion of an artillery shell of huge calibre, 20th May 1916". In the archive collection of the Monuments Historiques, the database lists 23 photographs taken by Sabatté of Arras, showing war damaged buildings, so it is highly likely that he worked from photographs in order to produce the painting, the Arras Belfry (Belfroi) held in the National Gallery of Ireland, from his salvage warehouse in the town.

Sabatté died after being struck by a German truck in Chamigny 22 October 1940.

== Known art works ==
- Ma Grand-mère (1895), Musée des Beaux-Arts de Bordeaux
- Près du feu (1896), Musée des Beaux-Arts de Dijon
- Intérieurs de Saint-Germain-des-Prés (1897), Musée des Beaux-Arts de Bordeaux
- Le Pauvre (1898), Musée des beaux-arts d'Agen
- The daughters of Danaus (1900), National Gallery of Victoria, Melbourne
- Inondation à Paris (1910), Carnavalet Museum
- The Arras Belfry (1916), National Gallery of Ireland
- Intérieur de la cathédrale d'Arras en ruines (1916), Musée d'Orsay
- Un Spartiate montre à ses fils un ilote ivre, École nationale supérieure des Beaux-Arts
- La Crypte, Musée d'Orsay
- Dans la gloire de Dieu, Musée Cantini
