= 2017 Sept-Sorts car attack =

Vehicle ramming attack in Sept-Sorts, France

Sept-Sorts car attack
- Location: 48°33′42″N 3°03′40″E; Sept-Sorts, Seine-et-Marne, France
- Date: 14 August 2017; 8:15 pm
- Attack type: Vehicular attack
- Weapon: BMW vehicle
- Deaths: 1
- Injuries: 12
- Perpetrator: David Patterson

On 14 August 2017, a car deliberately rammed into a busy pizzeria restaurant in Sept-Sorts, a village about 55 kilometres (34 mi) east from Paris, France. The attack resulted in the death of a 13-year-old girl and injuries to 12 people.

== Attack ==
The driver was in a BMW vehicle and smashed into the terrace of Cesena Pizzeria, where there were 20 people dining. The driver then tried to reverse, but was stopped. The gendarmes soon arrived at the scene and arrested the driver.

== Suspect and investigation ==
The suspect was later identified as 32-year-old David Patterson, a psychologically unstable and suicidal man thought to have links to the United Kingdom but a French national. He was not known to the police and acted alone, and the attack was not terror related. Patterson lived with his parents in La Ferté-sous-Jouarre and was thought to have been a cannabis smoker since the age of nine. French President Emmanuel Macron sent his condolences to the victims via Twitter. The attack came just five days after another car ramming attack in Paris that injured six people (see Levallois-Perret attack).
