= Beautheil-Saints =

- Commune
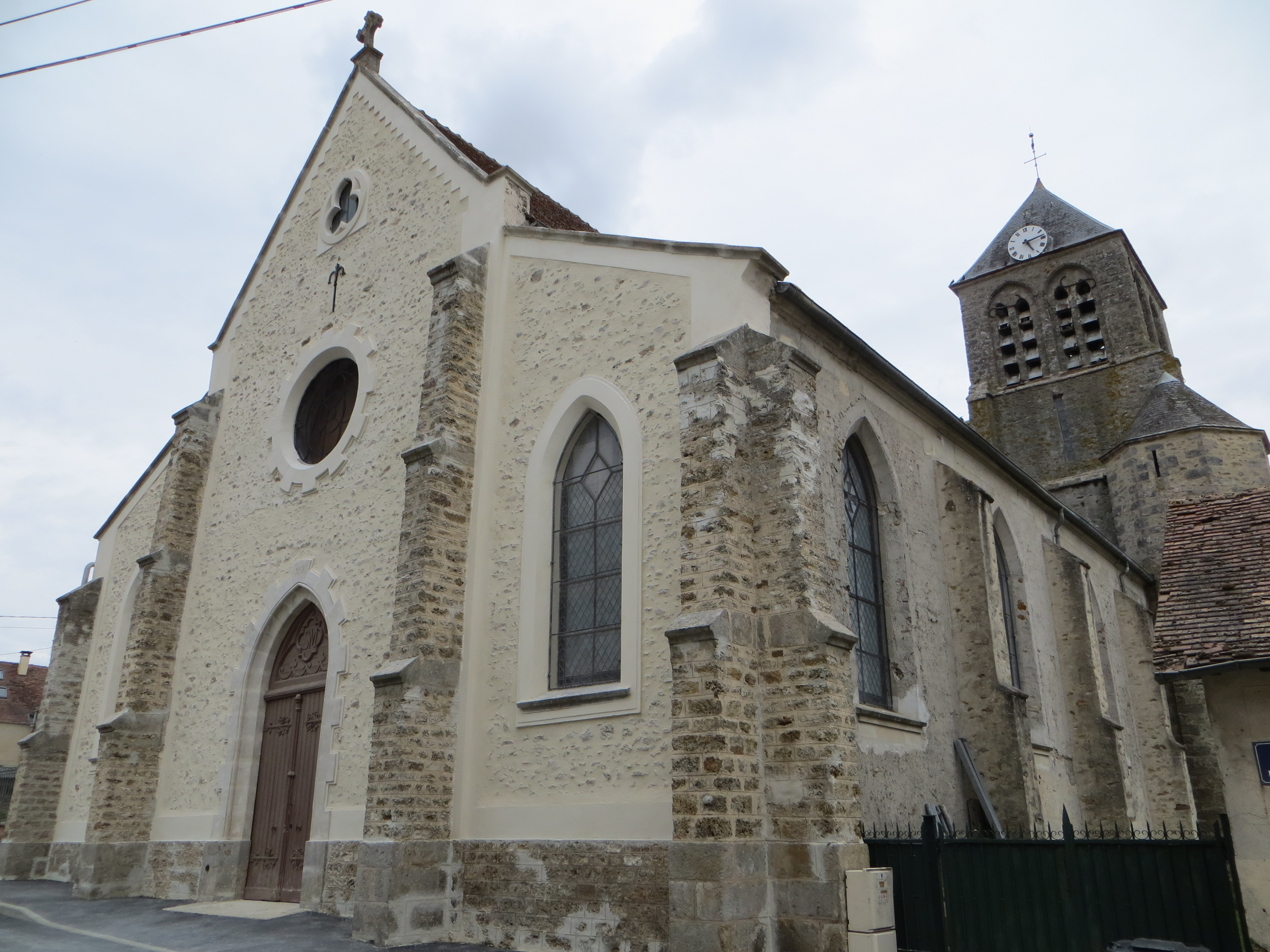
- The church in Saints
- Location of Beautheil-Saints
- Location within France Location within Île-de-France (region)
- Coordinates: 48°45′31″N 3°03′03″E
- Country: France
- Region: Île-de-France
- Department: Seine-et-Marne
- Arrondissement: Meaux
- Canton: Coulommiers
- Intercommunality: CA Coulommiers Pays de Brie

Government
  - Mayor (2020–2026): Bernard Jacotin
- Area^{1}: 38.41 km^{2} (14.83 sq mi)
- Highest elevation: 157 m (515 ft)
- Lowest elevation: 79 m (259 ft)
- Population (2023): 2,093
  - Density: 54.49/km^{2} (141.1/sq mi)
- Time zone: UTC+01:00 (CET)
  - Summer (DST): UTC+02:00 (CEST)
- INSEE/Postal code: 77433 /77120
- ^{1} French Land Register data, which excludes lakes, ponds, glaciers > 1 km^{2} (0.386 sq mi or 247 acres) and river estuaries.

Beautheil-Saints (French pronunciation: [botɛj sɛ̃]) is a commune in the Seine-et-Marne department in the Île-de-France region in north-central France. It was established on 1 January 2019 by merger of the former communes of Saints (the seat) and Beautheil.

== Population ==
Population data refer to the area corresponding with the commune as of January 2025.

Historical population
Year	Pop.	±% p.a.
1968	832	—
1975	904	+1.19%
1982	1,090	+2.71%
1990	1,417	+3.33%
1999	1,735	+2.28%
2007	1,972	+1.61%
2012	2,063	+0.91%
2017	2,015	−0.47%
2023	2,093	+0.63%
Source: INSEE

== See also ==
- Communes of the Seine-et-Marne department
