= Communauté d'agglomération Coulommiers Pays de Brie =

Coordinates: 48.82°N 3.11°E

Coulommiers Pays de Brie
- Communauté d'agglomération
- Interactive map of Coulommiers Pays de Brie
- Country: France
- Region: Île-de-France
- Department: Seine-et-Marne
- No. of communes: {{{nbcomm}}}
- Established: 2018
- Area: 582.7 km^{2} (225.0 sq mi)
- Population (2018): 92,149
  - Density: 158.1/km^{2} (409.6/sq mi)

The Communauté d'agglomération Coulommiers Pays de Brie is the communauté d'agglomération, an intercommunal structure, centred on the town of Coulommiers. It is located in the Seine-et-Marne department, in the Île-de-France region, north-central France. It was created in January 2018 by the merger of the former Communauté de communes du Pays de Coulommiers and the Communauté de communes du Pays Fertois. In January 2020 it was expanded with 12 communes from the former communauté de communes du Pays Créçois. Its area is 582.7 km^{2}. Its population was 92,149 in 2018, of which 14,757 in Coulommiers.

== Composition ==
The communauté d'agglomération consists of the following 54 communes:

- Amillis
- Aulnoy
- Bassevelle
- Beautheil-Saints
- Boissy-le-Châtel
- Bouleurs
- Bussières
- La Celle-sur-Morin
- Chailly-en-Brie
- Chamigny
- Changis-sur-Marne
- Chauffry
- Chevru
- Citry
- Condé-Sainte-Libiaire
- Couilly-Pont-aux-Dames
- Coulommes
- Coulommiers
- Coutevroult
- Crécy-la-Chapelle
- Dagny
- Dammartin-sur-Tigeaux
- Faremoutiers
- La Ferté-sous-Jouarre
- Giremoutiers
- Guérard
- Hautefeuille
- La Haute-Maison
- Jouarre
- Luzancy
- Maisoncelles-en-Brie
- Marolles-en-Brie
- Mauperthuis
- Méry-sur-Marne
- Mouroux
- Nanteuil-sur-Marne
- Pézarches
- Pierre-Levée
- Pommeuse
- Reuil-en-Brie
- Saâcy-sur-Marne
- Saint-Augustin
- Sainte-Aulde
- Saint-Jean-les-Deux-Jumeaux
- Sammeron
- Sancy
- Sept-Sorts
- Signy-Signets
- Touquin
- Tigeaux
- Ussy-sur-Marne
- Vaucourtois
- Villiers-sur-Morin
- Voulangis
