= Luzancy =

- Commune
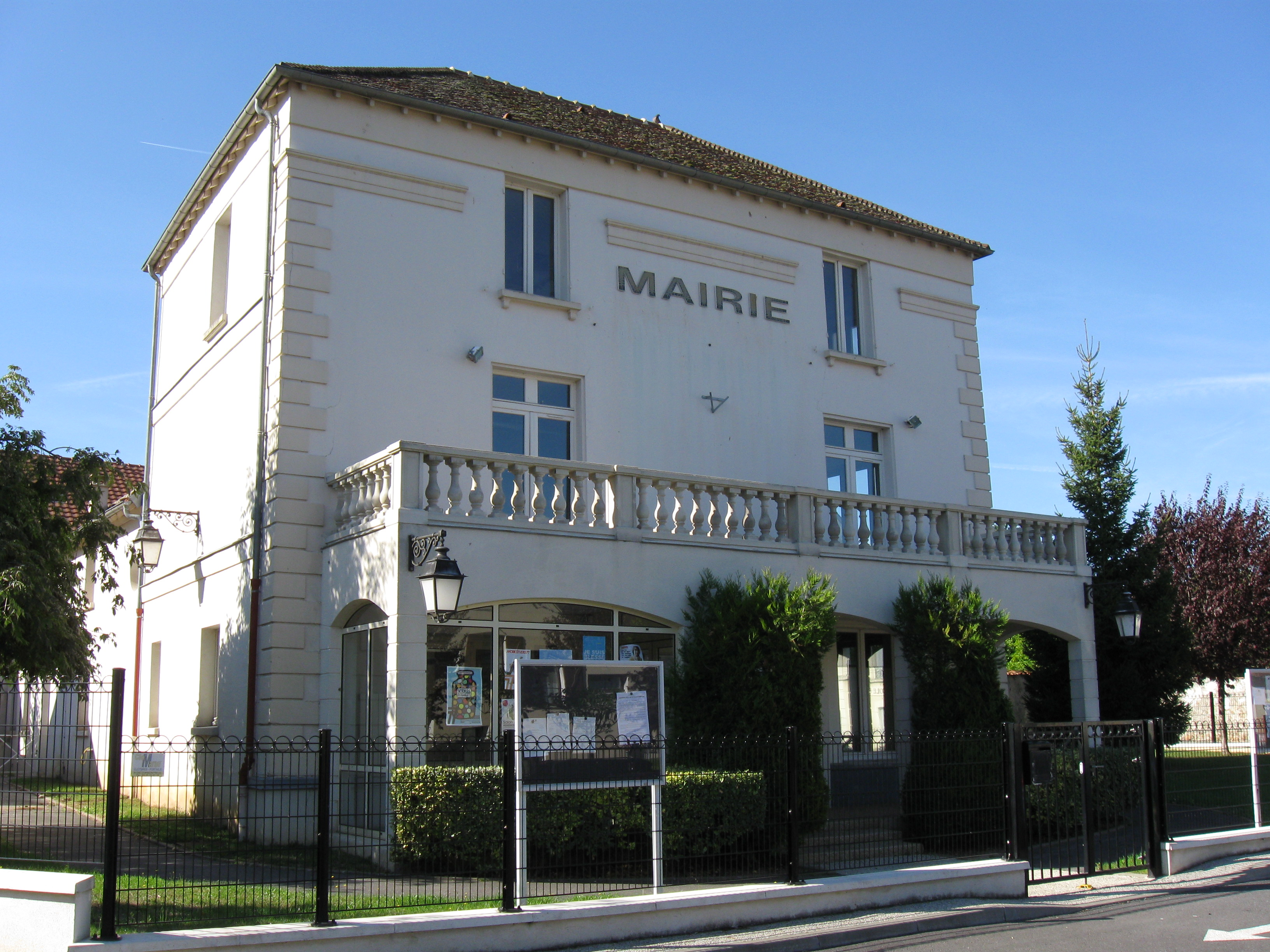
- The town hall in Luzancy
- Location of Luzancy
- Location within France Location within Île-de-France (region)
- Coordinates: 48°58′19″N 3°11′13″E
- Country: France
- Region: Île-de-France
- Department: Seine-et-Marne
- Arrondissement: Meaux
- Canton: La Ferté-sous-Jouarre
- Intercommunality: CA Coulommiers Pays de Brie

Government
  - Mayor (2023–2026): Joëlle Canini
- Area^{1}: 6.58 km^{2} (2.54 sq mi)
- Highest elevation: 167 m (548 ft)
- Lowest elevation: 52 m (171 ft)
- Population (2023): 1,036
  - Density: 157/km^{2} (408/sq mi)
- Time zone: UTC+01:00 (CET)
  - Summer (DST): UTC+02:00 (CEST)
- INSEE/Postal code: 77265 /77138
- ^{1} French Land Register data, which excludes lakes, ponds, glaciers > 1 km^{2} (0.386 sq mi or 247 acres) and river estuaries.

Luzancy (French pronunciation: [lyzɑ̃si]) is a commune in the Seine-et-Marne department in the Île-de-France region in north-central France.

== Demographics ==
Inhabitants are called Luzancéens.

== See also ==
- Communes of the Seine-et-Marne department
