= Sammeron =

- Commune
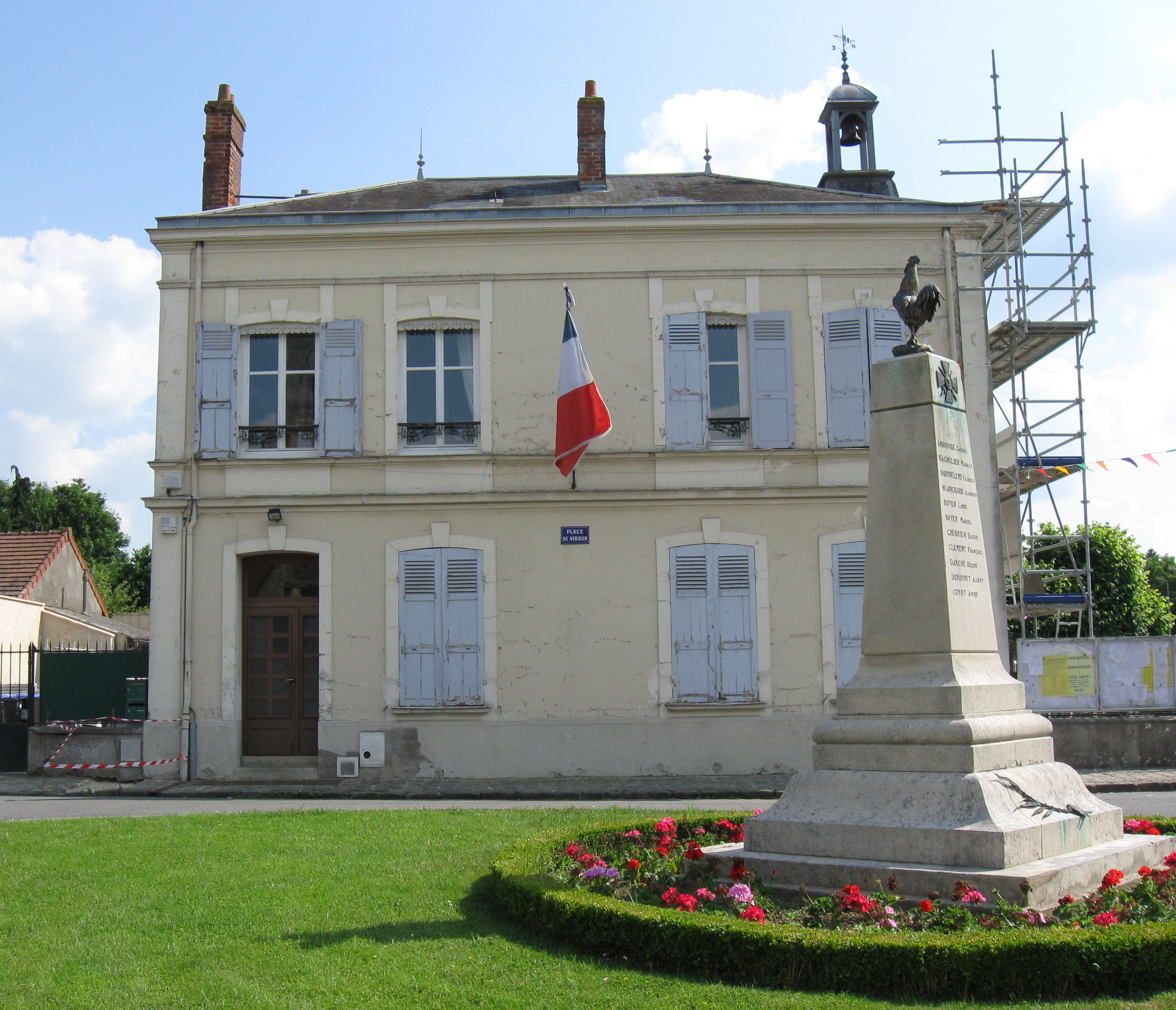
- The town hall in Sammeron
- Location of Sammeron
- Location within France Location within Île-de-France (region)
- Coordinates: 48°56′51″N 3°04′50″E
- Country: France
- Region: Île-de-France
- Department: Seine-et-Marne
- Arrondissement: Meaux
- Canton: La Ferté-sous-Jouarre
- Intercommunality: CA Coulommiers Pays de Brie

Government
  - Mayor (2020–2026): Didier Vuillaume
- Area^{1}: 6.06 km^{2} (2.34 sq mi)
- Highest elevation: 154 m (505 ft)
- Lowest elevation: 50 m (160 ft)
- Population (2023): 1,178
  - Density: 194/km^{2} (503/sq mi)
- Time zone: UTC+01:00 (CET)
  - Summer (DST): UTC+02:00 (CEST)
- INSEE/Postal code: 77440 /77260
- ^{1} French Land Register data, which excludes lakes, ponds, glaciers > 1 km^{2} (0.386 sq mi or 247 acres) and river estuaries.

Sammeron (French pronunciation: [samʁɔ̃]) is a commune in the Seine-et-Marne department in the Île-de-France region in north-central France.

== Demographics ==
Inhabitants of Sammeron are called Sammeronais.

== See also ==
- Communes of the Seine-et-Marne department
