= Saint-Jean-les-Deux-Jumeaux =

- Commune
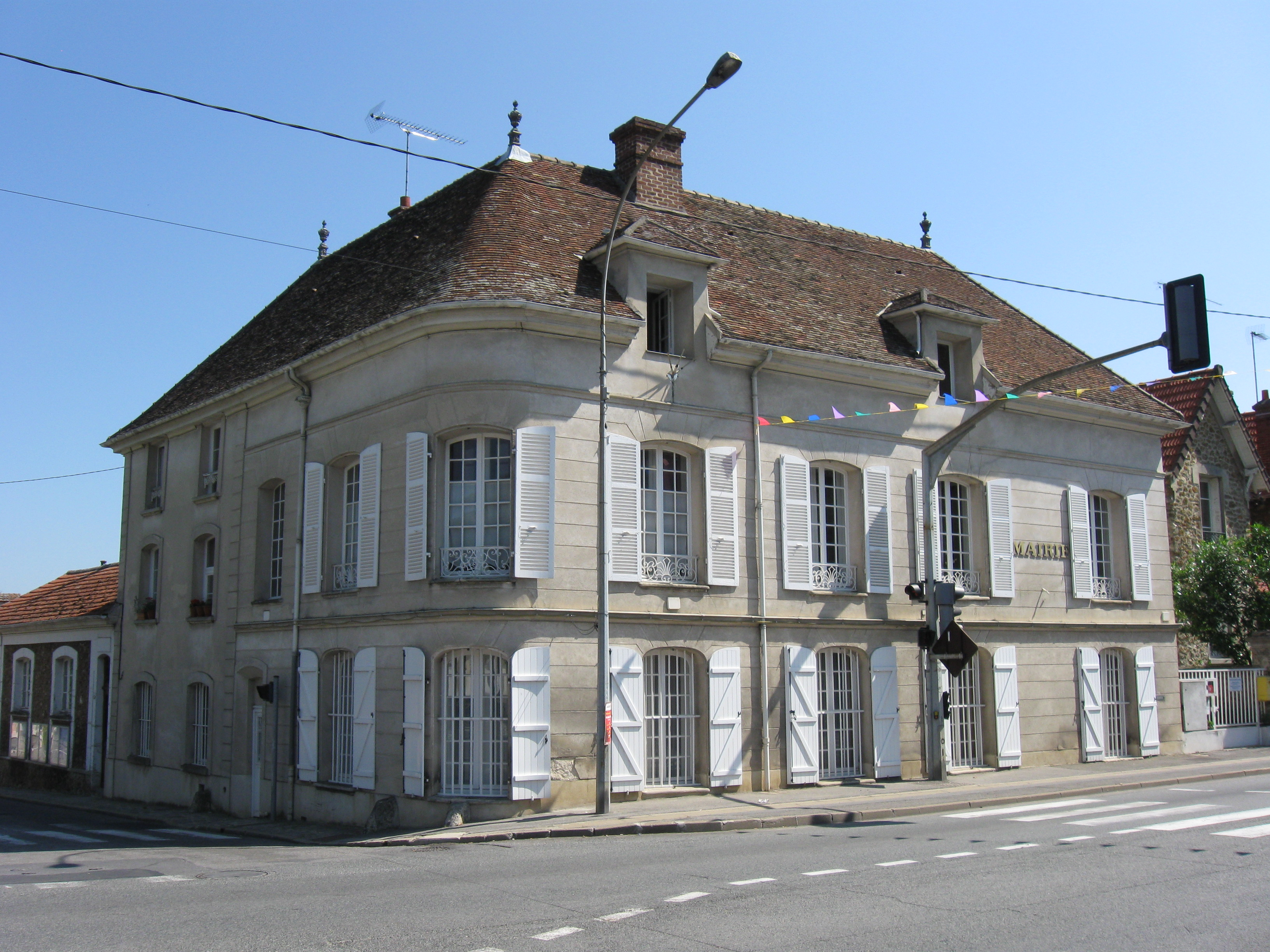
- The town hall in Saint-Jean-les-Deux-Jumeaux

- Coat of arms
- Location of Saint-Jean-les-Deux-Jumeaux
- Location within France Location within Île-de-France (region)
- Coordinates: 48°57′04″N 3°01′06″E
- Country: France
- Region: Île-de-France
- Department: Seine-et-Marne
- Arrondissement: Meaux
- Canton: La Ferté-sous-Jouarre
- Intercommunality: CA Coulommiers Pays de Brie

Government
  - Mayor (2020–2026): Laurence Miffre-Peretti
- Area^{1}: 13.26 km^{2} (5.12 sq mi)
- Highest elevation: 173 m (568 ft)
- Lowest elevation: 48 m (157 ft)
- Population (2023): 1,298
  - Density: 97.89/km^{2} (253.5/sq mi)
- Time zone: UTC+01:00 (CET)
  - Summer (DST): UTC+02:00 (CEST)
- INSEE/Postal code: 77415 /77660
- ^{1} French Land Register data, which excludes lakes, ponds, glaciers > 1 km^{2} (0.386 sq mi or 247 acres) and river estuaries.

Saint-Jean-les-Deux-Jumeaux (French: [sɛ̃ ʒɑ̃ le dø ʒymo]) is a commune in the Seine-et-Marne department in the Île-de-France region in north-central France.

== Demographics ==
Inhabitants of Saint-Jean-les-Deux-Jumeaux are called Saint-Jeannais.

== See also ==
- Communes of the Seine-et-Marne department
