= Changis-sur-Marne =

- Commune
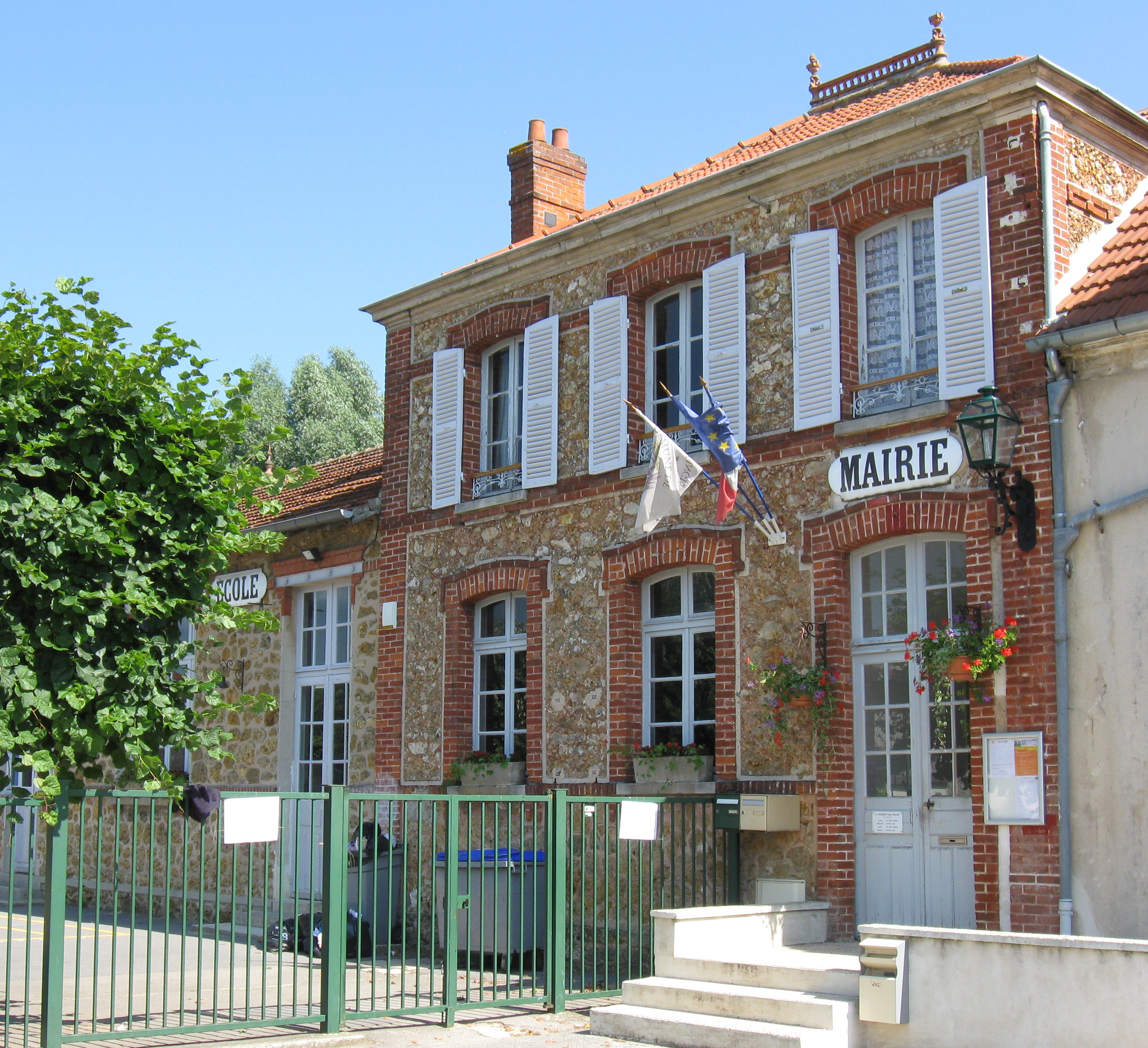
- The town hall in Changis-sur-Marne

- Coat of arms
- Location of Changis-sur-Marne
- Location within France Location within Île-de-France (region)
- Coordinates: 48°57′27″N 3°01′08″E
- Country: France
- Region: Île-de-France
- Department: Seine-et-Marne
- Arrondissement: Meaux
- Canton: La Ferté-sous-Jouarre
- Intercommunality: CA Coulommiers Pays de Brie

Government
  - Mayor (2020–2026): Jean-François Bergamini
- Area^{1}: 6.98 km^{2} (2.69 sq mi)
- Highest elevation: 107 m (351 ft)
- Lowest elevation: 48 m (157 ft)
- Population (2023): 1,335
  - Density: 191/km^{2} (495/sq mi)
- Time zone: UTC+01:00 (CET)
  - Summer (DST): UTC+02:00 (CEST)
- INSEE/Postal code: 77084 /77660
- ^{1} French Land Register data, which excludes lakes, ponds, glaciers > 1 km^{2} (0.386 sq mi or 247 acres) and river estuaries.

Changis-sur-Marne (French: [ʃɑ̃ʒi syʁ maʁn]) is a commune in the Seine-et-Marne department in the Île-de-France region in north-central France.

== Demographics ==
The inhabitants are called Changissois for men and Changissoise for women.

== See also ==
- Communes of the Seine-et-Marne department
