= Saâcy-sur-Marne =

- Commune
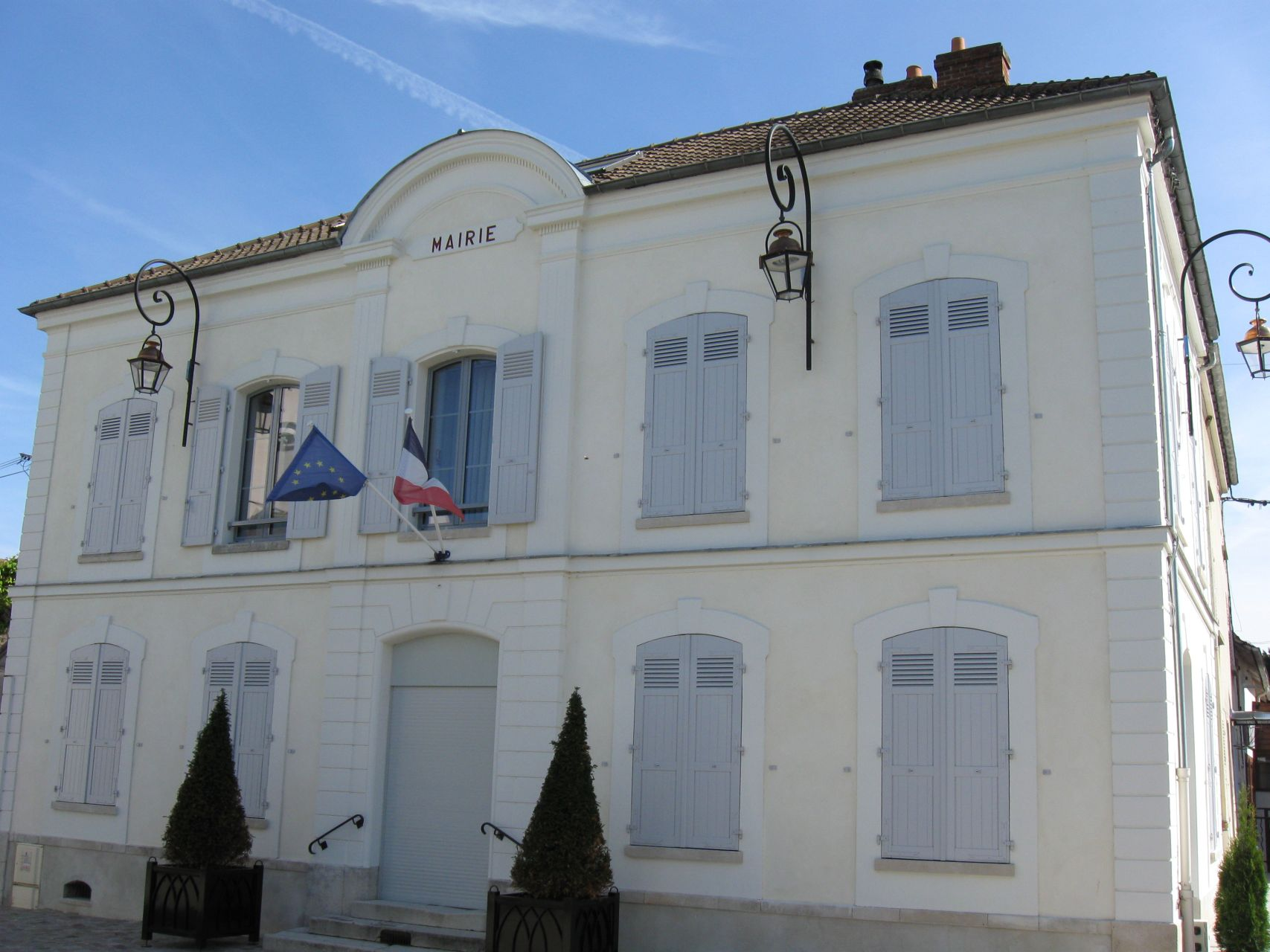
- The town hall in Saâcy-sur-Marne

- Coat of arms
- Location of Saâcy-sur-Marne
- Location within France Location within Île-de-France (region)
- Coordinates: 48°57′45″N 3°12′43″E
- Country: France
- Region: Île-de-France
- Department: Seine-et-Marne
- Arrondissement: Meaux
- Canton: La Ferté-sous-Jouarre
- Intercommunality: Coulommiers Pays de Brie

Government
  - Mayor (2020–2026): Katy Veysset
- Area^{1}: 13.80 km^{2} (5.33 sq mi)
- Highest elevation: 207 m (679 ft)
- Lowest elevation: 52 m (171 ft)
- Population (2023): 1,878
  - Density: 136.1/km^{2} (352.5/sq mi)
- Time zone: UTC+01:00 (CET)
  - Summer (DST): UTC+02:00 (CEST)
- INSEE/Postal code: 77397 /77730
- ^{1} French Land Register data, which excludes lakes, ponds, glaciers > 1 km^{2} (0.386 sq mi or 247 acres) and river estuaries.

Saâcy-sur-Marne (French pronunciation: [sasi syʁ maʁn], literally Saâcy on Marne) is a commune in the Seine-et-Marne department in the Île-de-France region in north-central France.

== Demographics ==
Inhabitants of Saâcy-sur-Marne are called Saâcyats in French.

Historical population
Year	Pop.	±% p.a.
1968	1,074	—
1975	1,207	+1.68%
1982	1,187	−0.24%
1990	1,393	+2.02%
1999	1,658	+1.95%
2007	1,756	+0.72%
2012	1,766	+0.11%
2017	1,813	+0.53%
2023	1,878	+0.59%
Source: INSEE

== See also ==
- Communes of the Seine-et-Marne department
