= Signy-Signets =

- Commune
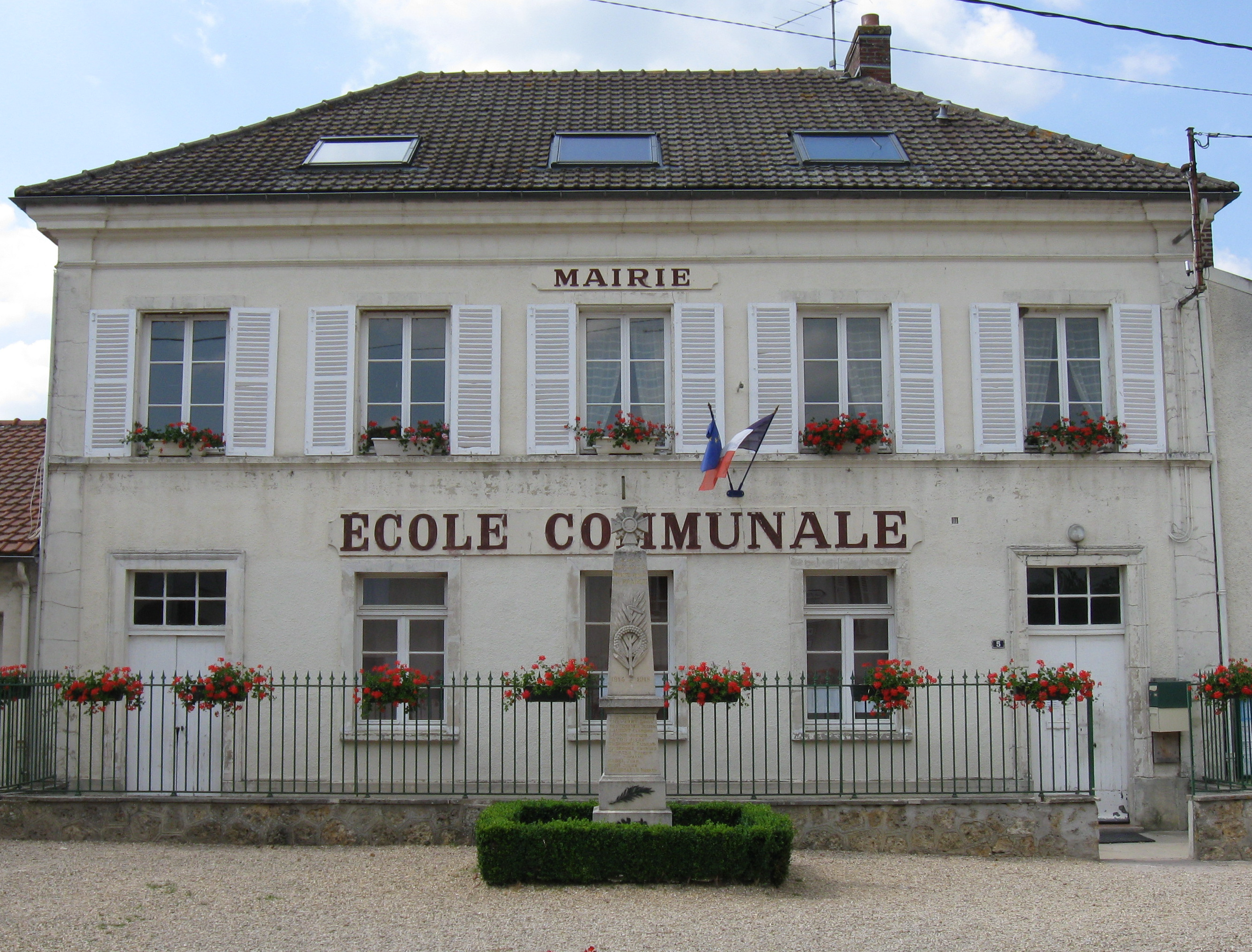
- The town hall in Signy-Signets

- Coat of arms
- Location of Signy-Signets
- Location within France Location within Île-de-France (region)
- Coordinates: 48°55′40″N 3°04′04″E
- Country: France
- Region: Île-de-France
- Department: Seine-et-Marne
- Arrondissement: Meaux
- Canton: La Ferté-sous-Jouarre
- Intercommunality: CA Coulommiers Pays de Brie

Government
  - Mayor (2020–2026): Philippe Fourmy
- Area^{1}: 13.44 km^{2} (5.19 sq mi)
- Highest elevation: 172 m (564 ft)
- Lowest elevation: 77 m (253 ft)
- Population (2023): 638
  - Density: 47.5/km^{2} (123/sq mi)
- Time zone: UTC+01:00 (CET)
  - Summer (DST): UTC+02:00 (CEST)
- INSEE/Postal code: 77451 /77640
- ^{1} French Land Register data, which excludes lakes, ponds, glaciers > 1 km^{2} (0.386 sq mi or 247 acres) and river estuaries.

Signy-Signets (French pronunciation: [siɲi siɲɛ]) is a commune in the Seine-et-Marne department in the Île-de-France region in north-central France.

== Demographics ==
Inhabitants of Signy-Signets are called Signaciens.

== See also ==
- Communes of the Seine-et-Marne department
