= Reuil-en-Brie =

- Commune
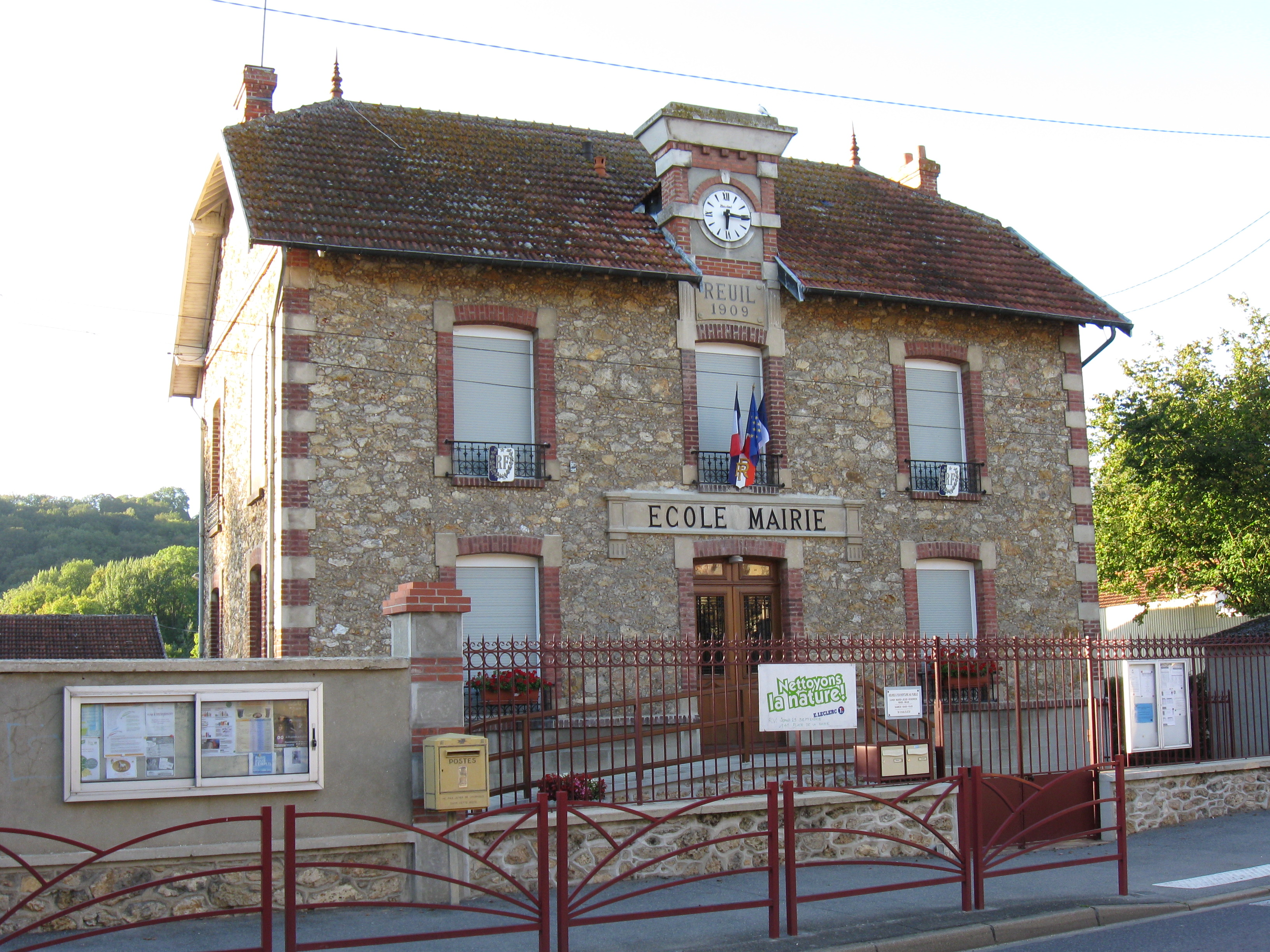
- The town hall in Reuil-en-Brie

- Coat of arms
- Location of Reuil-en-Brie
- Location within France Location within Île-de-France (region)
- Coordinates: 48°57′41″N 3°08′51″E
- Country: France
- Region: Île-de-France
- Department: Seine-et-Marne
- Arrondissement: Meaux
- Canton: La Ferté-sous-Jouarre
- Intercommunality: Coulommiers Pays de Brie

Government
  - Mayor (2020–2026): Patrick Romanow
- Area^{1}: 5.92 km^{2} (2.29 sq mi)
- Highest elevation: 185 m (607 ft)
- Lowest elevation: 51 m (167 ft)
- Population (2023): 798
  - Density: 135/km^{2} (349/sq mi)
- Time zone: UTC+01:00 (CET)
  - Summer (DST): UTC+02:00 (CEST)
- INSEE/Postal code: 77388 /77260
- ^{1} French Land Register data, which excludes lakes, ponds, glaciers > 1 km^{2} (0.386 sq mi or 247 acres) and river estuaries.

Reuil-en-Brie (French pronunciation: [ʁœj ɑ̃ bʁi], lit. 'Reuil in Brie') is a commune in the Seine-et-Marne department in the Île-de-France region in north-central France.

The settlement grew up around the monastery founded by Rado, a mayor of the palace of Burgundy, in about 630, which from his name was called Radolium. In later times it was a priory of Cluny.

== Population ==
The inhabitants are called Reuillois in French.

Historical population
Year	Pop.	±% p.a.
1968	312	—
1975	378	+2.78%
1982	388	+0.37%
1990	508	+3.43%
1999	819	+5.45%
2007	865	+0.69%
2012	832	−0.77%
2017	834	+0.05%
2023	798	−0.73%
Source: INSEE

== See also ==
- Reuil
- Communes of the Seine-et-Marne department
