= Ussy-sur-Marne =

- Commune
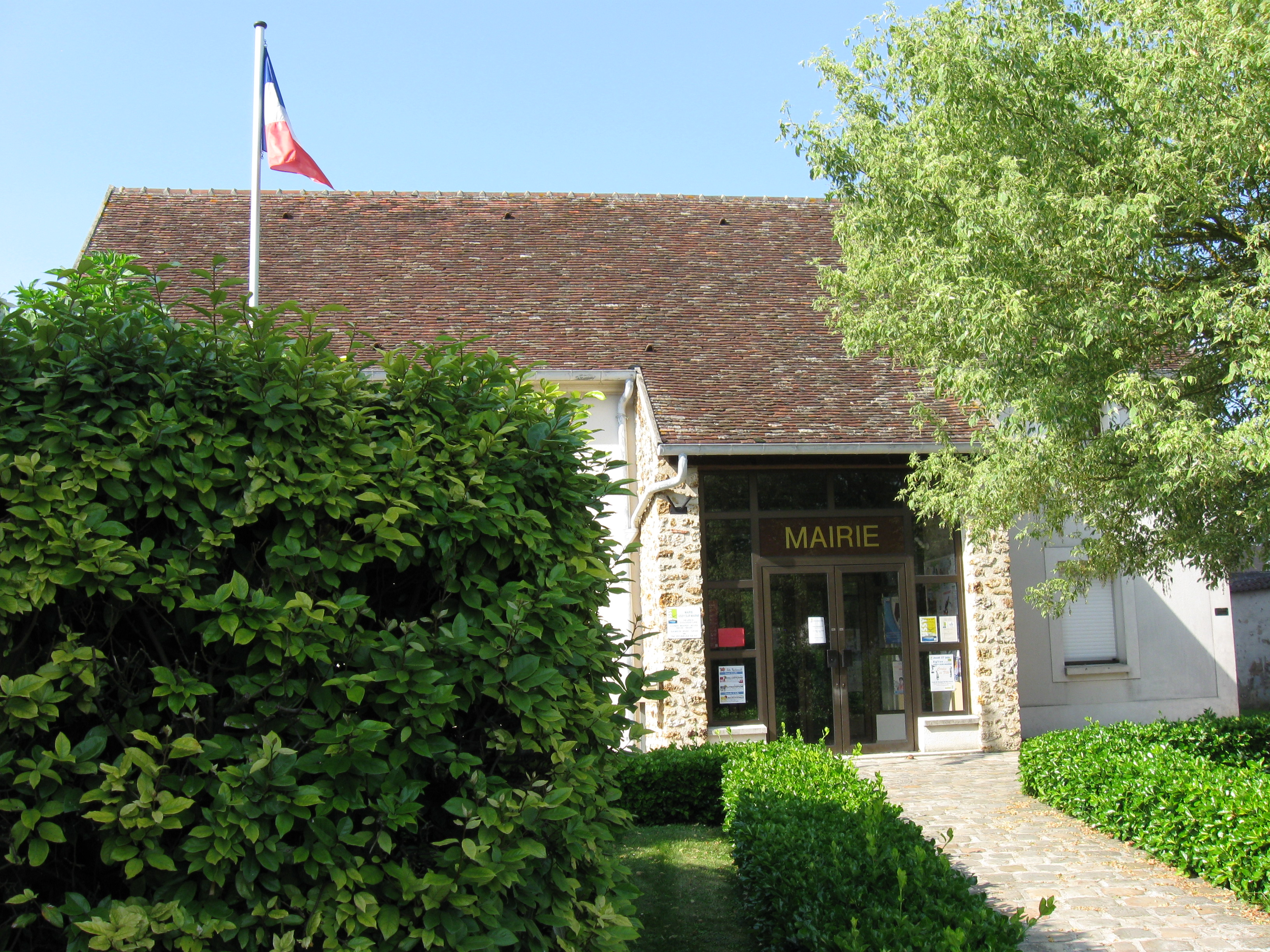
- The town hall in Ussy-sur-Marne
- Location of Ussy-sur-Marne
- Location within France Location within Île-de-France (region)
- Coordinates: 48°57′18″N 3°04′18″E
- Country: France
- Region: Île-de-France
- Department: Seine-et-Marne
- Arrondissement: Meaux
- Canton: La Ferté-sous-Jouarre
- Intercommunality: CA Coulommiers Pays de Brie

Government
  - Mayor (2020–2026): Pierre Horde
- Area^{1}: 13.93 km^{2} (5.38 sq mi)
- Highest elevation: 166 m (545 ft)
- Lowest elevation: 50 m (160 ft)
- Population (2023): 1,058
  - Density: 75.95/km^{2} (196.7/sq mi)
- Time zone: UTC+01:00 (CET)
  - Summer (DST): UTC+02:00 (CEST)
- INSEE/Postal code: 77478 /77260
- ^{1} French Land Register data, which excludes lakes, ponds, glaciers > 1 km^{2} (0.386 sq mi or 247 acres) and river estuaries.

Ussy-sur-Marne (French pronunciation: [ysi syʁ maʁn], literally Ussy on Marne) is a commune in the Seine-et-Marne department in the Île-de-France region in north-central France.

== Demographics ==
Inhabitants of Ussy-sur-Marne are called Ussois.

== Notable people ==
- André the Giant (1946–1993), professional wrestler and actor
- Samuel Beckett (1906–1989), Irish playwright who lived and worked in France, owned a house in the village

== See also ==
- Communes of the Seine-et-Marne department
