= Sept-Sorts =

- Commune
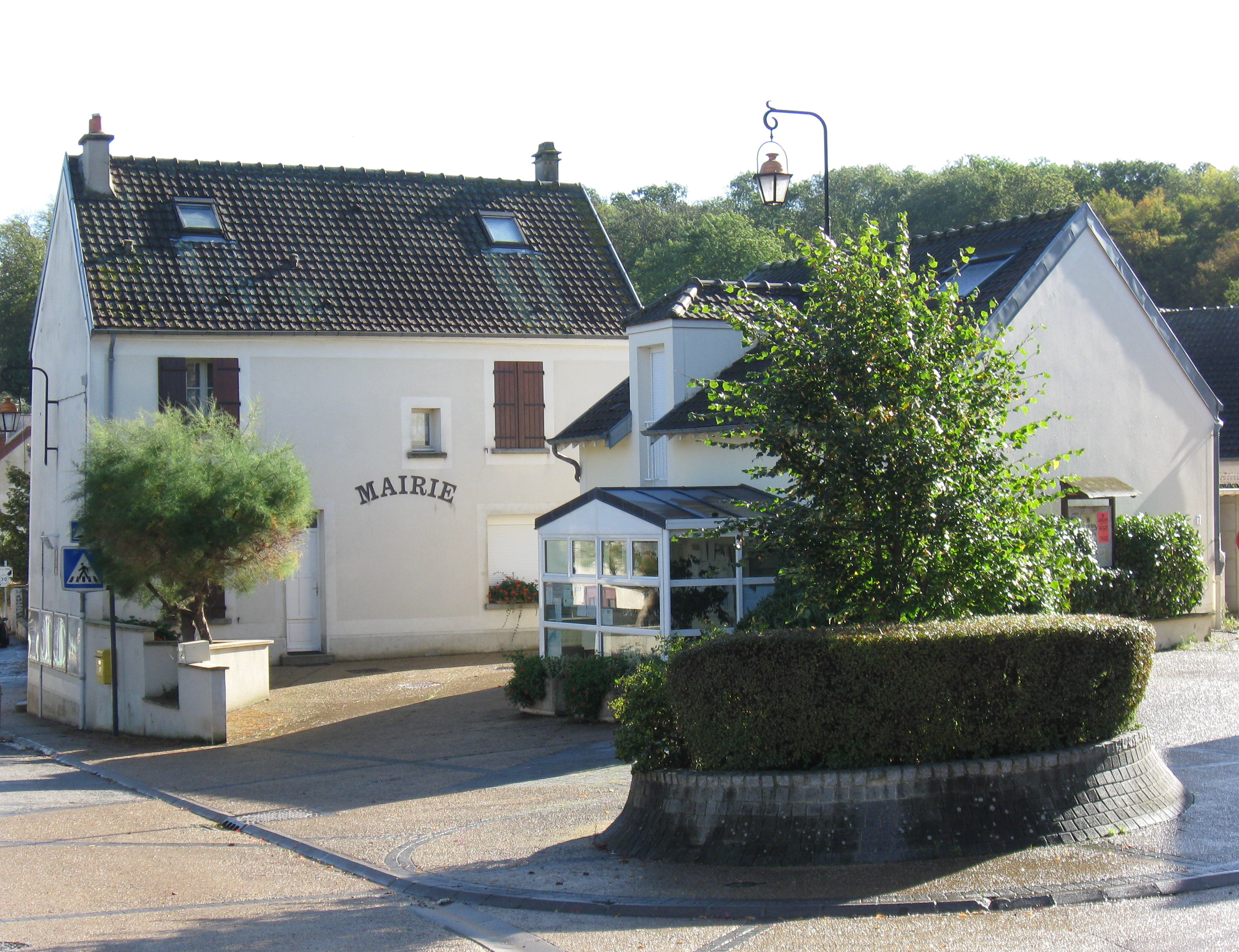
- The town hall of Sept-Sorts

- Coat of arms

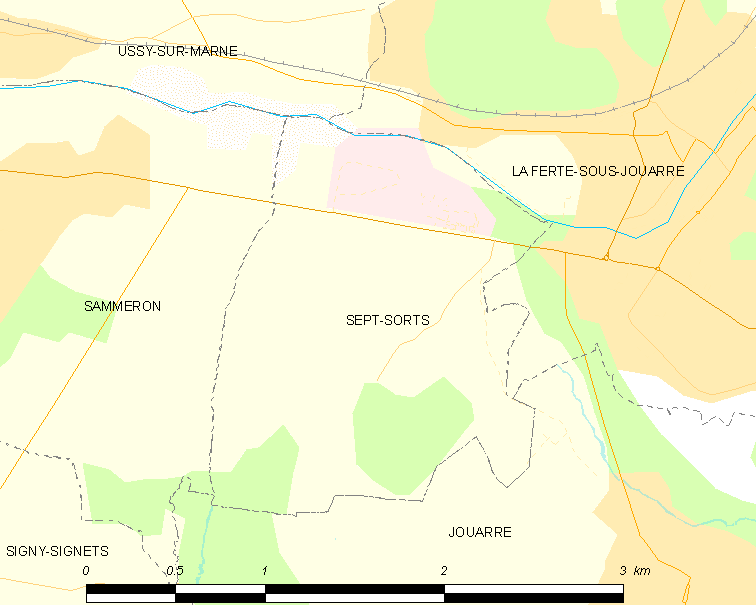
- Location of Sept-Sorts
- Location within France Location within Île-de-France (region)
- Coordinates: 48°56′16″N 3°06′11″E
- Country: France
- Region: Île-de-France
- Department: Seine-et-Marne
- Arrondissement: Meaux
- Canton: La Ferté-sous-Jouarre
- Intercommunality: CA Coulommiers Pays de Brie

Government
  - Mayor (2020–2026): François Arnoult
- Area^{1}: 3.22 km^{2} (1.24 sq mi)
- Highest elevation: 150 m (490 ft)
- Lowest elevation: 50 m (160 ft)
- Population (2023): 616
  - Density: 191/km^{2} (495/sq mi)
- Time zone: UTC+01:00 (CET)
  - Summer (DST): UTC+02:00 (CEST)
- INSEE/Postal code: 77448 /77260
- ^{1} French Land Register data, which excludes lakes, ponds, glaciers > 1 km^{2} (0.386 sq mi or 247 acres) and river estuaries.

Sept-Sorts (French pronunciation: [sɛt sɔʁ]) is a commune in the Seine-et-Marne department in the Île-de-France region in north-central France, east of Paris. It was the site of the Sept-Sorts ramming attack.

== Name ==
The name Sept-Sorts comes from Latin septum, seven and ancient French sourt, spring. Sept Sorts means seven springs.

== Demographics ==
Inhabitants of Sept-Sorts are called Septsortais.

== See also ==
- Communes of the Seine-et-Marne department
