= Sainte-Aulde =

- Commune
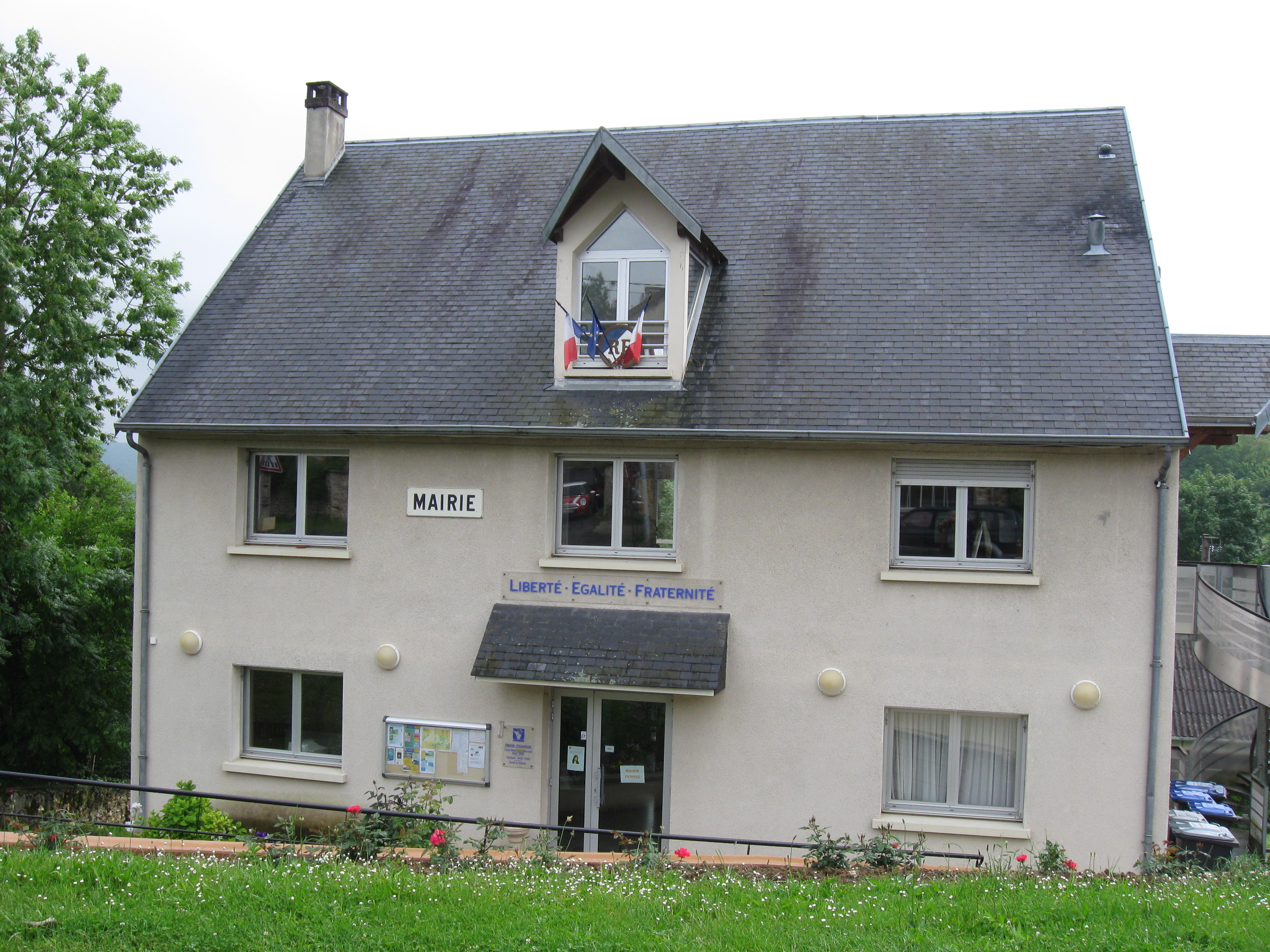
- The town hall in Sainte-Aulde

- Coat of arms
- Location of Sainte-Aulde
- Location within France Location within Île-de-France (region)
- Coordinates: 48°59′37″N 3°10′20″E
- Country: France
- Region: Île-de-France
- Department: Seine-et-Marne
- Arrondissement: Meaux
- Canton: La Ferté-sous-Jouarre
- Intercommunality: CA Coulommiers Pays de Brie

Government
  - Mayor (2020–2026): Marie-Noelle Stanislas
- Area^{1}: 8.63 km^{2} (3.33 sq mi)
- Highest elevation: 201 m (659 ft)
- Lowest elevation: 52 m (171 ft)
- Population (2023): 706
  - Density: 81.8/km^{2} (212/sq mi)
- Time zone: UTC+01:00 (CET)
  - Summer (DST): UTC+02:00 (CEST)
- INSEE/Postal code: 77401 /77260
- ^{1} French Land Register data, which excludes lakes, ponds, glaciers > 1 km^{2} (0.386 sq mi or 247 acres) and river estuaries.

Sainte-Aulde (French pronunciation: [sɛ̃t old]) is a commune in the Seine-et-Marne department in the Île-de-France region in north-central France.

== Demographics ==
Inhabitants of Sainte-Aulde are called Saintaldais (male) or Saintaldaise (female).

== See also ==
- Communes of the Seine-et-Marne department
