= Saints, Seine-et-Marne =

Saints
- Part of Beautheil-Saints
- Location of Saints
- Location within France Location within Île-de-France (region)
- Coordinates: 48°45′31″N 3°03′03″E
- Country: France
- Region: Île-de-France
- Department: Seine-et-Marne
- Arrondissement: Meaux
- Canton: Coulommiers
- Commune: Beautheil-Saints
- Area^{1}: 20.04 km^{2} (7.74 sq mi)
- Highest elevation: 156 m (512 ft)
- Lowest elevation: 79 m (259 ft)
- Population (2019): 1,334
  - Density: 66.57/km^{2} (172.4/sq mi)
- Time zone: UTC+01:00 (CET)
  - Summer (DST): UTC+02:00 (CEST)
- Postal code: 77120
- ^{1} French Land Register data, which excludes lakes, ponds, glaciers > 1 km^{2} (0.386 sq mi or 247 acres) and river estuaries.

Saints (French pronunciation: [sɛ̃]) is a former commune in the Seine-et-Marne department in the Île-de-France region in north-central France. On 1 January 2019, it was merged into the new commune Beautheil-Saints.

== History ==
Saints appears on early maps as Sanz. It is an agricultural village perched above the Petit Aubetin River.

For a short period of time, this village became the operating base of almost the entire US Air Service, the predecessor of the US Air Force. The 1st Pursuit Group was based in Saints for just short of two months— from July 8 to September 1, 1918 out of the seven months it saw combat. And for two weeks before that, the 1st Observation Group's 1st and 12th Aero Squadrons were based there.

Two adjacent villages—Mauperthuis and Touquin—also play a role in the lives of these men and the US Air Service. The men were based in Touquin from the end of June until July 8, when they moved to Saints. And the men were lodged in Mauperthuis, half a mile from Saints, while they were flying out of Saints.

Quentin Roosevelt was based here when he was shot down and killed.

== Industry ==
The village has one small factory - the Tuilerie Thibault. Other than that there are some small farms and one large one - Les Aulnois - which serves as a banquet hall. Les Aulnois had once been a Templar's relay station.

== Education ==
There is single boys and girls school in the village which serves elementary school children.

== Geography ==
The village lies on the right bank of the Aubetin, which flows westward through the southern part of the commune.

== Demographics ==
Inhabitants of Saints are called Saintois.

== Administration ==
The Mayor (as of March, 2008) is Monsieur Bernard Jacotin. Past mayors include André Louvet, Guy Fahy, Robert Thibault, Joseph Pratte, Emile Pradier, Louis Emile Vion and Henri Thibault.

== See also ==
- Communes of the Seine-et-Marne department
