= Chailly-en-Brie =

- Commune
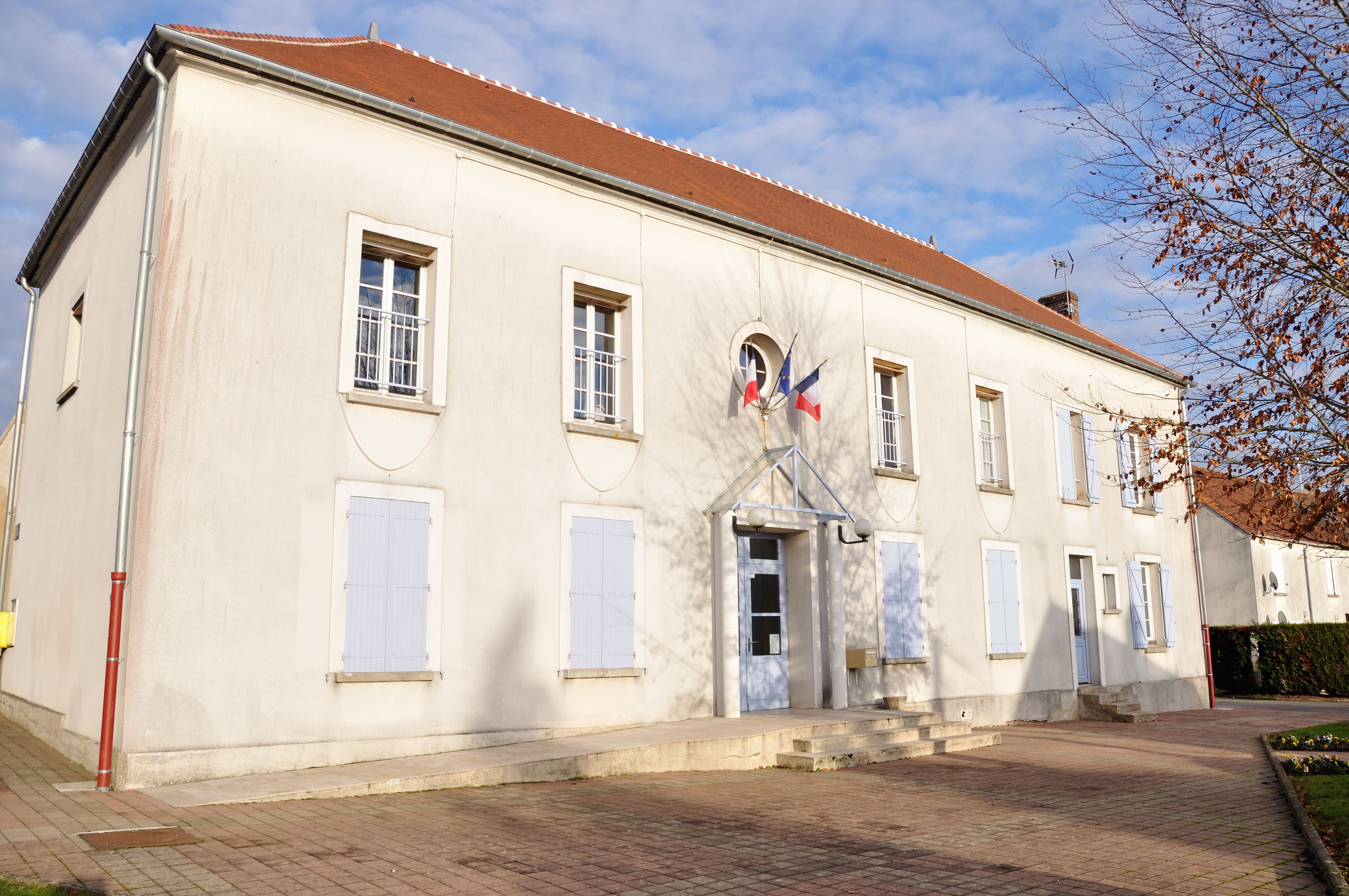
- The town hall in Chailly-en-Brie

- Coat of arms
- Location of Chailly-en-Brie
- Location within France Location within Île-de-France (region)
- Coordinates: 48°47′25″N 3°07′29″E
- Country: France
- Region: Île-de-France
- Department: Seine-et-Marne
- Arrondissement: Meaux
- Canton: Coulommiers
- Intercommunality: CA Coulommiers Pays de Brie

Government
  - Mayor (2023–2026): Sebastien Corbisier
- Area^{1}: 17.36 km^{2} (6.70 sq mi)
- Highest elevation: 159 m (522 ft)
- Lowest elevation: 72 m (236 ft)
- Population (2023): 1,576
  - Density: 90.78/km^{2} (235.1/sq mi)
- Time zone: UTC+01:00 (CET)
  - Summer (DST): UTC+02:00 (CEST)
- INSEE/Postal code: 77070 /77120
- ^{1} French Land Register data, which excludes lakes, ponds, glaciers > 1 km^{2} (0.386 sq mi or 247 acres) and river estuaries.

Chailly-en-Brie (French pronunciation: [ʃaji ɑ̃ bʁi], literally Chailly in Brie) is a commune in the Seine-et-Marne department in the Île-de-France region in north-central France. It is located approximately 40 miles (64 km) to the east of Paris.

== Demographics ==
The inhabitants are called Caïbotins.

== See also ==
- Communes of the Seine-et-Marne department
