= Guérard =

- Commune
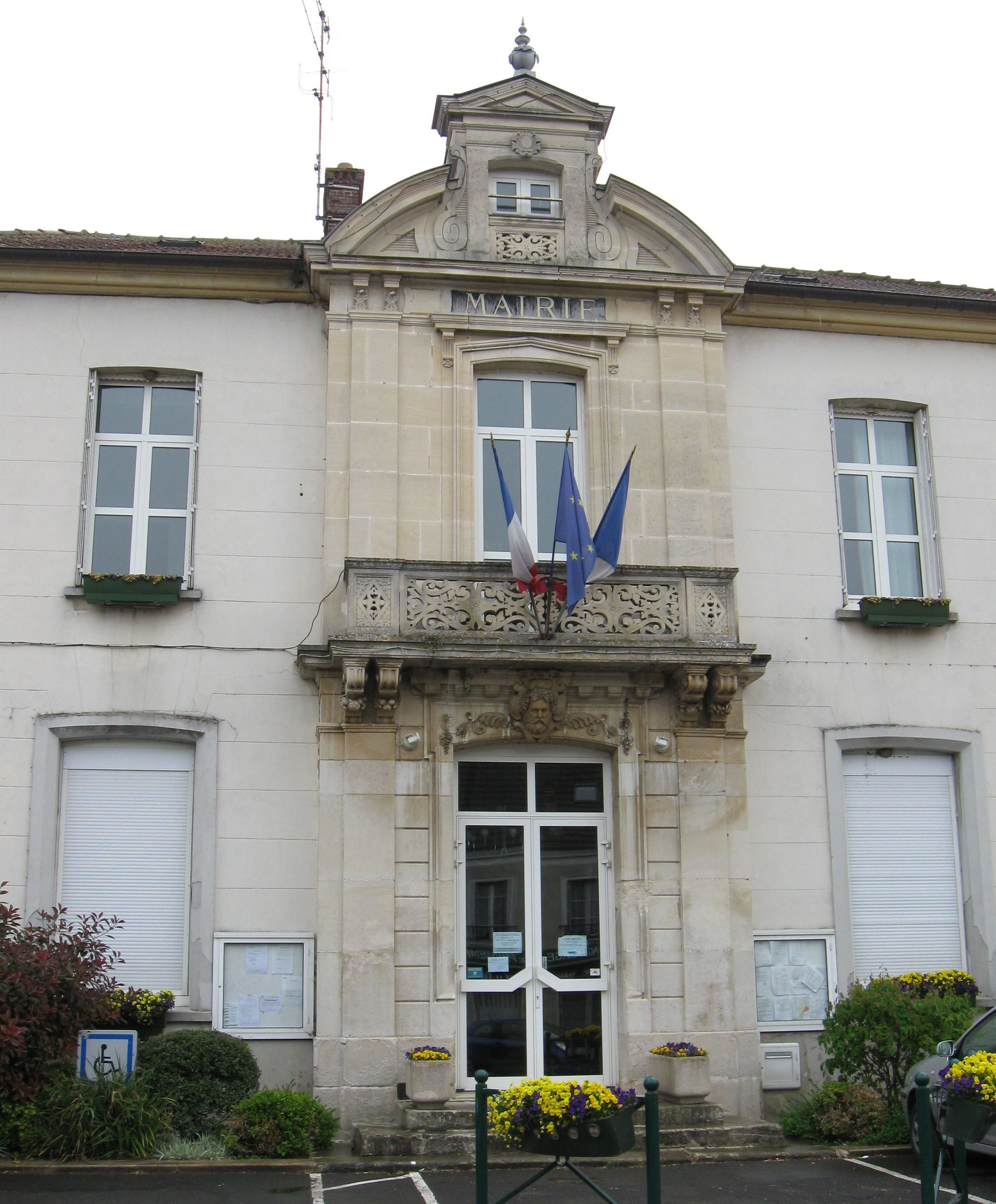
- The town hall in Guérard
- Location of Guérard
- Location within France Location within Île-de-France (region)
- Coordinates: 48°49′00″N 2°58′00″E
- Country: France
- Region: Île-de-France
- Department: Seine-et-Marne
- Arrondissement: Meaux
- Canton: Fontenay-Trésigny
- Intercommunality: CA Coulommiers Pays de Brie

Government
  - Mayor (2020–2026): Daniel Nalis
- Area^{1}: 19.80 km^{2} (7.64 sq mi)
- Highest elevation: 153 m (502 ft)
- Lowest elevation: 50 m (160 ft)
- Population (2023): 2,688
  - Density: 135.8/km^{2} (351.6/sq mi)
- Time zone: UTC+01:00 (CET)
  - Summer (DST): UTC+02:00 (CEST)
- INSEE/Postal code: 77219 /77580
- ^{1} French Land Register data, which excludes lakes, ponds, glaciers > 1 km^{2} (0.386 sq mi or 247 acres) and river estuaries.

Guérard (French pronunciation: [ɡeʁaʁ]) is a commune in the Seine-et-Marne department in the Île-de-France region in north-central France.

== Population ==
Historical population
Year	Pop.	±% p.a.
1968	913	—
1975	1,022	+1.62%
1982	1,422	+4.83%
1990	1,781	+2.85%
1999	1,970	+1.13%
2007	2,166	+1.19%
2012	2,263	+0.88%
2017	2,480	+1.85%
2023	2,688	+1.35%
Source: INSEE

Inhabitants are called Guérardais in French.

== See also ==
- Communes of the Seine-et-Marne department
