= Dagny, Seine-et-Marne =

Dagny
- Commune
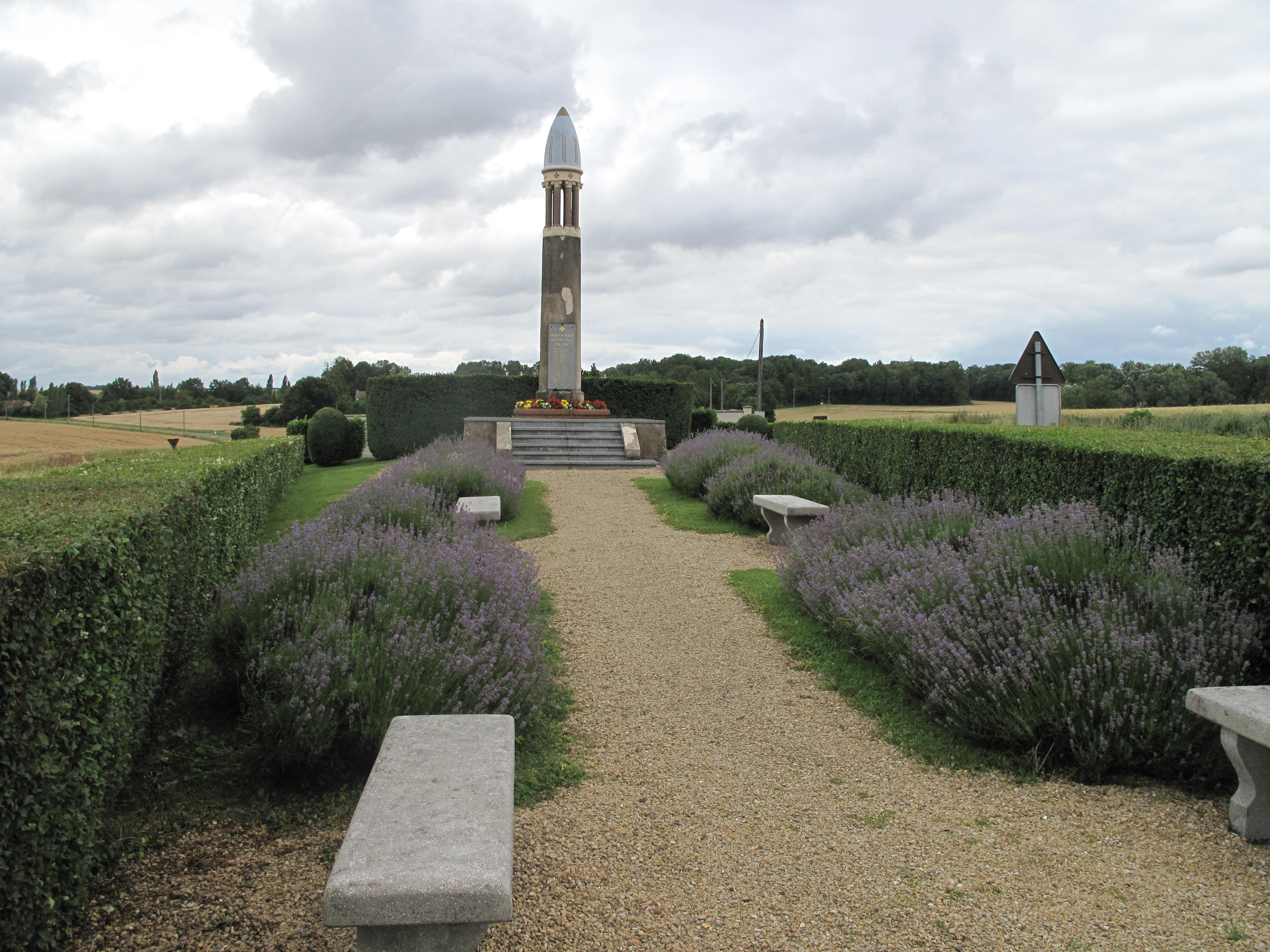
- The war memorial in Dagny
- Location of Dagny
- Location within France Location within Île-de-France (region)
- Coordinates: 48°43′00″N 3°10′00″E
- Country: France
- Region: Île-de-France
- Department: Seine-et-Marne
- Arrondissement: Meaux
- Canton: Coulommiers
- Intercommunality: Coulommiers Pays de Brie

Government
  - Mayor (2020–2026): Jean-Raymond Patin
- Area^{1}: 7.89 km^{2} (3.05 sq mi)
- Highest elevation: 159 m (522 ft)
- Lowest elevation: 112 m (367 ft)
- Population (2023): 305
  - Density: 38.7/km^{2} (100/sq mi)
- Time zone: UTC+01:00 (CET)
  - Summer (DST): UTC+02:00 (CEST)
- INSEE/Postal code: 77151 /77320
- ^{1} French Land Register data, which excludes lakes, ponds, glaciers > 1 km^{2} (0.386 sq mi or 247 acres) and river estuaries.

Dagny (French pronunciation: [daɲi]) is a commune in the Seine-et-Marne department in the Île-de-France region in north-central France.

== Population ==
Historical population
Year	Pop.	±% p.a.
1968	179	—
1975	200	+1.60%
1982	229	+1.95%
1990	272	+2.17%
1999	322	+1.89%
2007	340	+0.68%
2012	334	−0.36%
2017	294	−2.52%
2023	305	+0.61%
Source: INSEE

== Geography ==
The river Aubetin flows northwestward through the commune.

== See also ==
- Communes of the Seine-et-Marne department
