= Beautheil =

Commune in Seine-et-Marne, France

- Part of Beautheil-Saints
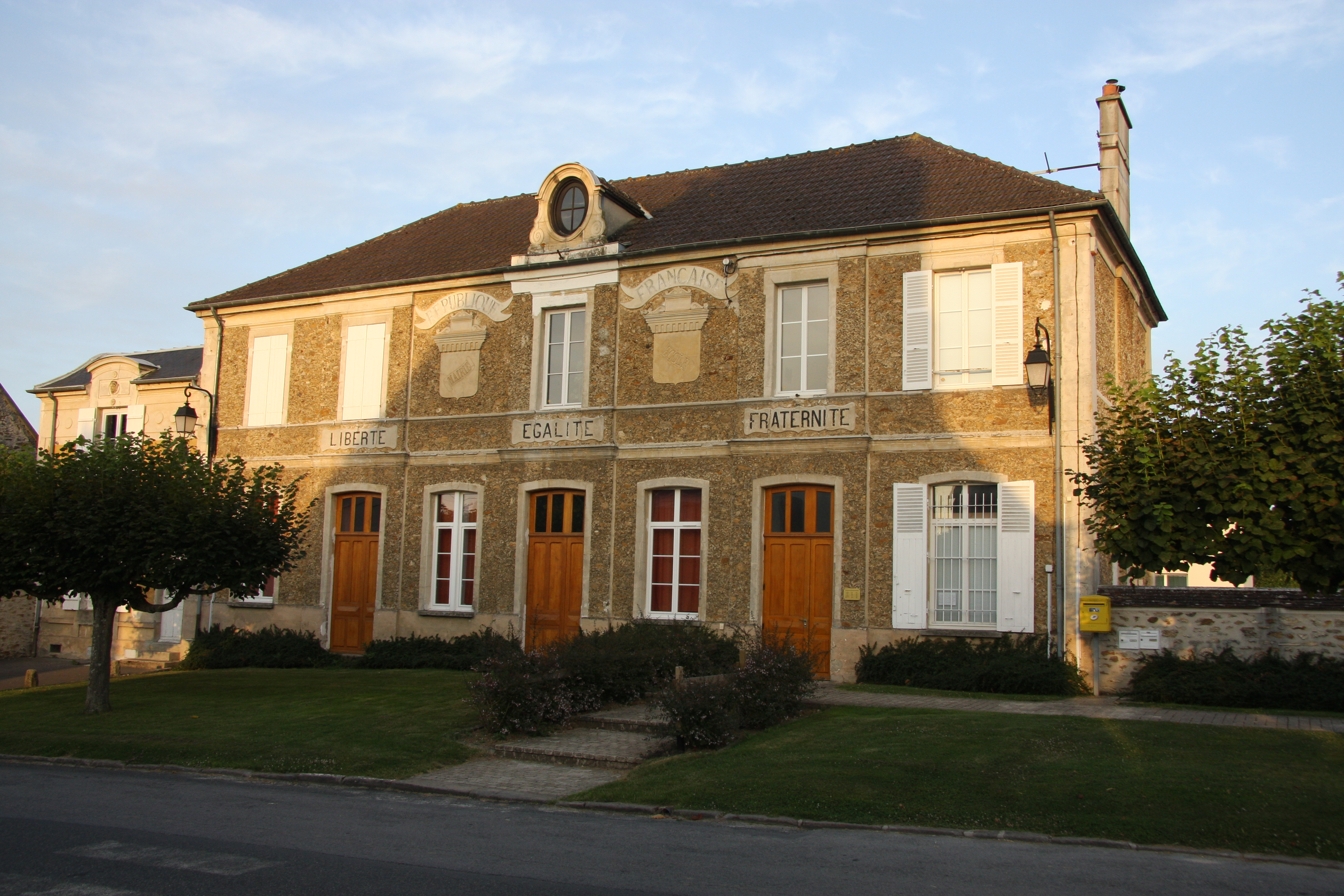
- Town hall
- Location of Beautheil
- Location within France Location within Île-de-France (region)
- Coordinates: 48°45′49″N 3°05′16″E
- Country: France
- Region: Île-de-France
- Department: Seine-et-Marne
- Arrondissement: Meaux
- Canton: Coulommiers
- Commune: Beautheil-Saints
- Area^{1}: 18.37 km^{2} (7.09 sq mi)
- Highest elevation: 157 m (515 ft)
- Lowest elevation: 89 m (292 ft)
- Population (2019): 658
  - Density: 35.8/km^{2} (92.8/sq mi)
- Time zone: UTC+01:00 (CET)
  - Summer (DST): UTC+02:00 (CEST)
- Postal code: 77120
- ^{1} French Land Register data, which excludes lakes, ponds, glaciers > 1 km^{2} (0.386 sq mi or 247 acres) and river estuaries.

Beautheil (French pronunciation: [botɛj]) is a former commune in the Seine-et-Marne department in the Île-de-France region in north-central France. On 1 January 2019, it was merged into the new commune Beautheil-Saints.

== Geography ==
The river Aubetin flows westward through the southern part of the commune.

== See also ==
- Communes of the Seine-et-Marne department
