= Chamigny =

- Commune
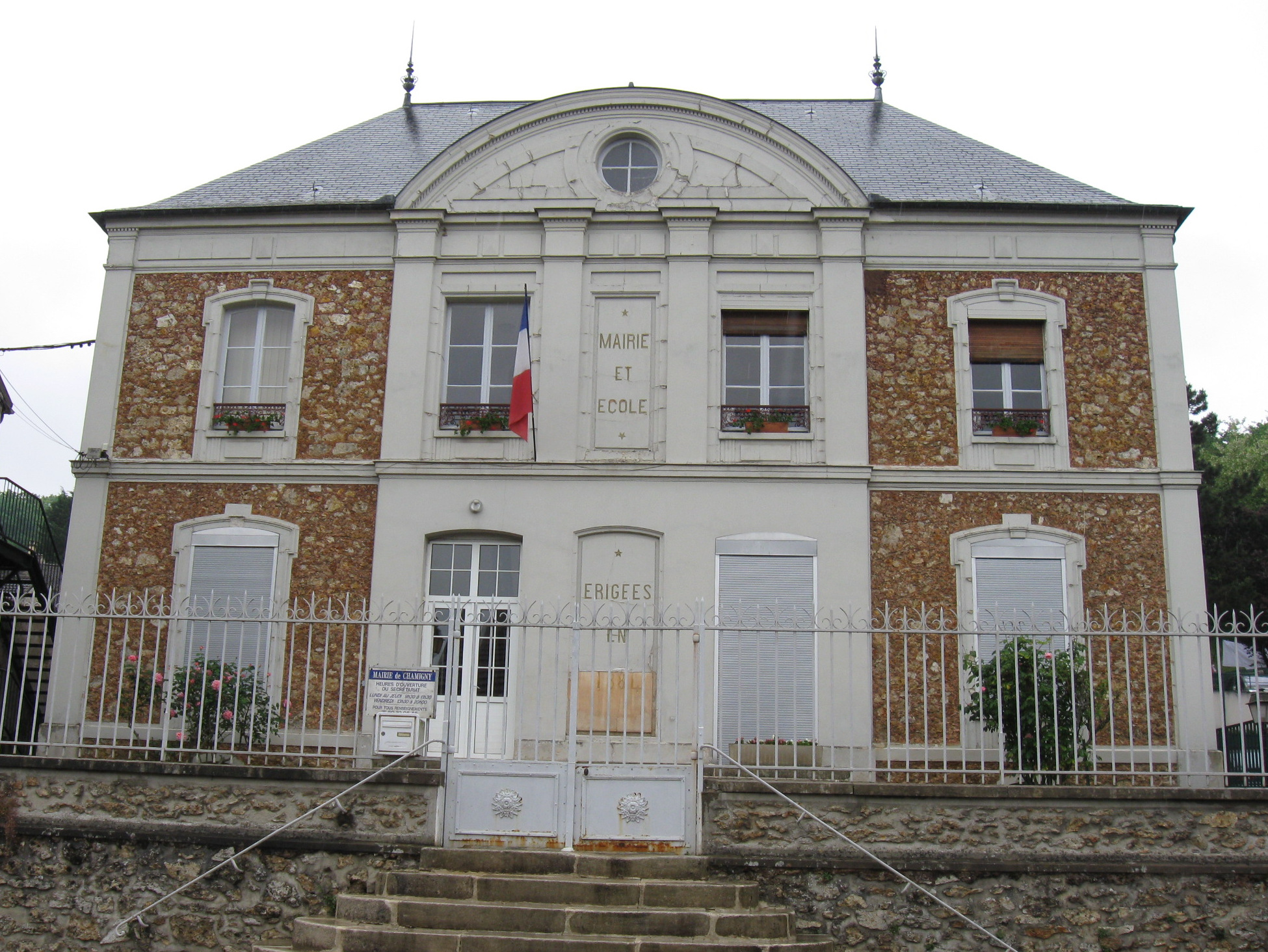
- The town hall in Chamigny

- Coat of arms
- Location of Chamigny
- Location within France Location within Île-de-France (region)
- Coordinates: 48°58′26″N 3°09′07″E
- Country: France
- Region: Île-de-France
- Department: Seine-et-Marne
- Arrondissement: Meaux
- Canton: La Ferté-sous-Jouarre
- Intercommunality: CA Coulommiers Pays de Brie

Government
  - Mayor (2023–2026): Sylvie Le Breton
- Area^{1}: 14.22 km^{2} (5.49 sq mi)
- Highest elevation: 198 m (650 ft)
- Lowest elevation: 50 m (160 ft)
- Population (2023): 1,480
  - Density: 104/km^{2} (270/sq mi)
- Time zone: UTC+01:00 (CET)
  - Summer (DST): UTC+02:00 (CEST)
- INSEE/Postal code: 77078 /77260
- ^{1} French Land Register data, which excludes lakes, ponds, glaciers > 1 km^{2} (0.386 sq mi or 247 acres) and river estuaries.

Chamigny (French pronunciation: [ʃamiɲi]) is a commune in the Seine-et-Marne department in the Île-de-France region in north-central France.

It is located in the Marne valley in a wooded setting, east of the main D603 road.

The inhabitants are called Chamignots.

== Sights and monuments ==
The Château de Tanqueux manor house dates back to 1488, and the parish church of St Étienne to 1130.

The gardens of the Château de Tanqueux were laid out in 1805. Privately owned, they are not open to the public. The parish church was modified in the 13th and 14th centuries. It has been classified since 1981 as a monument historique by the French Ministry of Culture.

== See also ==
- Communes of the Seine-et-Marne department
