= Mauperthuis =

- Commune
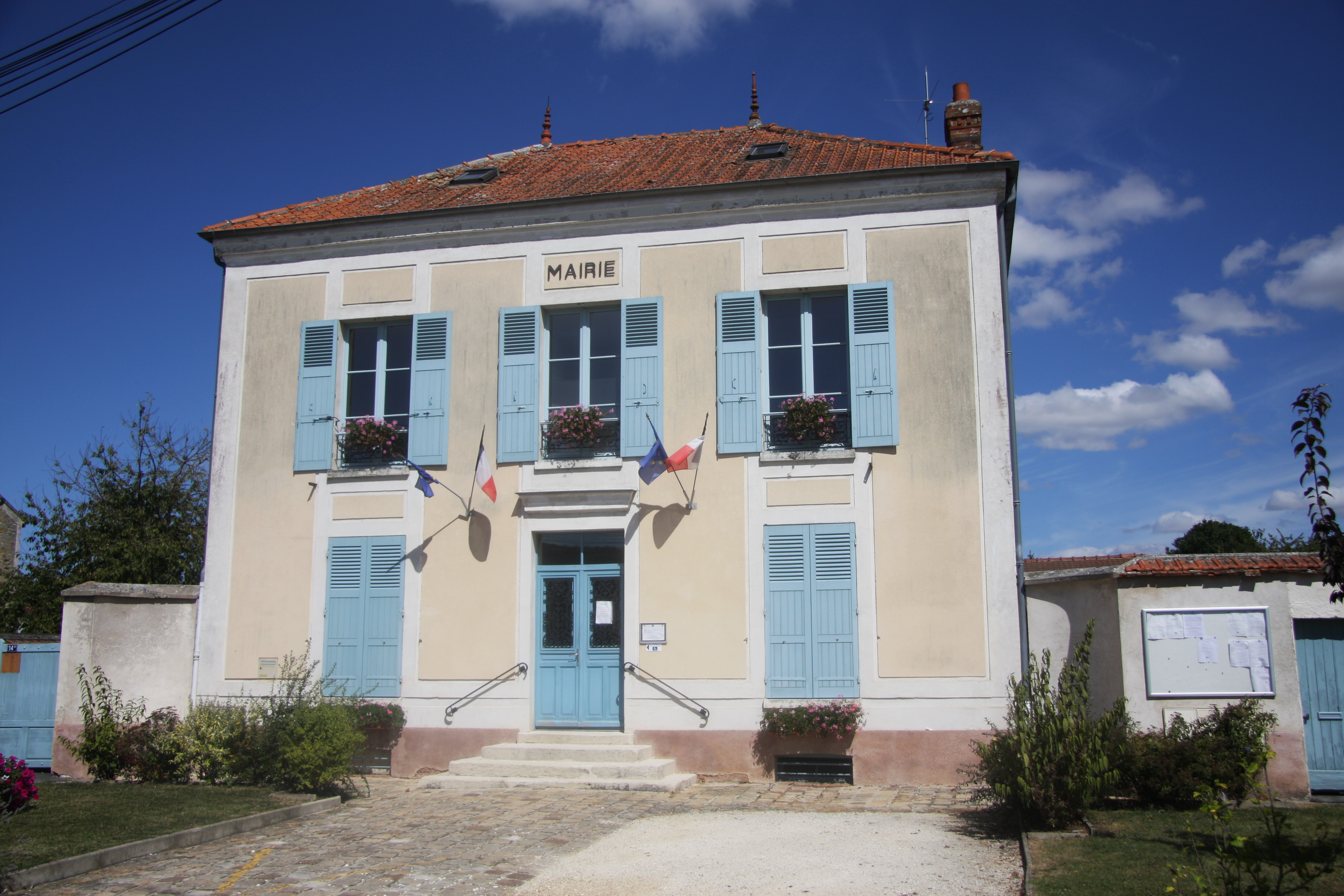
- The town hall in Mauperthuis

- Coat of arms
- Location of Mauperthuis
- Location within France Location within Île-de-France (region)
- Coordinates: 48°46′07″N 3°02′22″E
- Country: France
- Region: Île-de-France
- Department: Seine-et-Marne
- Arrondissement: Meaux
- Canton: Coulommiers
- Intercommunality: CA Coulommiers Pays de Brie

Government
  - Mayor (2020–2026): Dominique Carlier
- Area^{1}: 1.97 km^{2} (0.76 sq mi)
- Highest elevation: 138 m (453 ft)
- Lowest elevation: 76 m (249 ft)
- Population (2023): 495
  - Density: 251/km^{2} (651/sq mi)
- Time zone: UTC+01:00 (CET)
  - Summer (DST): UTC+02:00 (CEST)
- INSEE/Postal code: 77281 /77120
- ^{1} French Land Register data, which excludes lakes, ponds, glaciers > 1 km^{2} (0.386 sq mi or 247 acres) and river estuaries.

Mauperthuis (French pronunciation: [mopɛʁtɥi]) is a commune in the Seine-et-Marne department in the Île-de-France region in north-central France.

The village is famous for having produced five Musketeers including d'Artagnan, who was made famous in Alexandre Dumas, père's books. The ruined Château d'Artagnan still exists. Much of the land once belonged to the Montesquieu Family.

This one tiny village billeted some of the U.S. Air Service (precursor to the U.S. Air Force) while the men flew out of the adjacent village of Saints. They were in Mauperthuis probably for just short of two months – from 8 July to 1 September 1918 out of the seven months it saw combat.

Two adjacent villages – Saints and Touquin – also play a role in the lives of these men and the U.S. Air Service. The men were based in Touquin from the end of June until 8 July, when they moved to Saints. The men were lodged in Mauperthuis, half a mile from Saints, while they were flying out of Saints.

Quentin Roosevelt was billeted here when he was shot down and killed on 14 July 1918.

Mauperthuis was occupied by the Prussians during the Franco-Prussian War of 1870–1871. It was also overrun by the Germans for one or two days in September, 1914 before being liberated by the British under General French. It was once again in German hands from 1940 to 1944. American tanks of the US 3rd Armored Division under General Maurice Rose liberated Mauperthuis on 27 August 1944.

== Geography ==
The river Aubetin forms part of the commune's south-western border.

== Demographics ==
The inhabitants are called the Malperthusiens.

== See also ==
- Communes of the Seine-et-Marne department
