= Marolles-en-Brie, Seine-et-Marne =

Marolles-en-Brie
- Commune
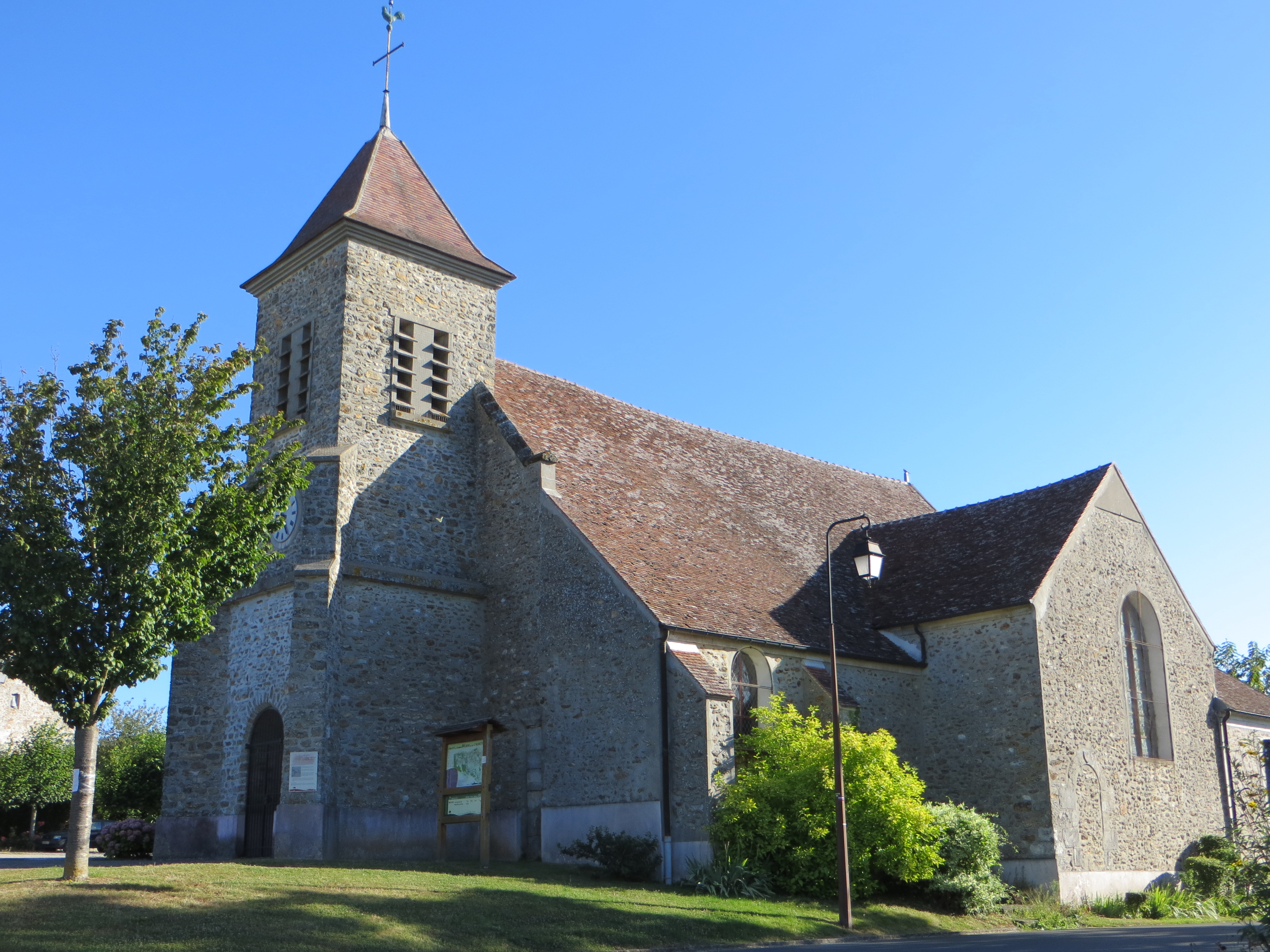
- The church in Marolles-en-Brie

- Coat of arms
- Location of Marolles-en-Brie
- Location within France Location within Île-de-France (region)
- Coordinates: 48°46′41″N 3°09′54″E
- Country: France
- Region: Île-de-France
- Department: Seine-et-Marne
- Arrondissement: Meaux
- Canton: Coulommiers
- Intercommunality: CA Coulommiers Pays de Brie

Government
  - Mayor (2020–2026): Christine Guillette
- Area^{1}: 9.05 km^{2} (3.49 sq mi)
- Highest elevation: 161 m (528 ft)
- Lowest elevation: 99 m (325 ft)
- Population (2023): 412
  - Density: 45.5/km^{2} (118/sq mi)
- Time zone: UTC+01:00 (CET)
  - Summer (DST): UTC+02:00 (CEST)
- INSEE/Postal code: 77278 /77120
- ^{1} French Land Register data, which excludes lakes, ponds, glaciers > 1 km^{2} (0.386 sq mi or 247 acres) and river estuaries.

Marolles-en-Brie (French pronunciation: [maʁɔl ɑ̃ bʁi]; lit. 'Marolles-in-Brie') is a commune in the Seine-et-Marne department in the Île-de-France region in northern France.

== Demographics ==
Inhabitants are called Marollais.

== See also ==
- Communes of the Seine-et-Marne department
