= Prestressed concrete bridge =

Bridge made of prestressed concrete

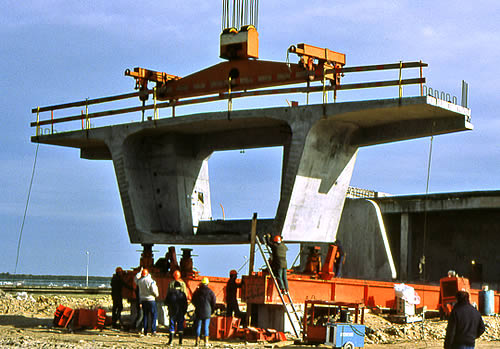
A segment of the Île de Ré Bridge

A prestressed concrete bridge is a bridge whose load-bearing structure (arch or girder) is made of prestressed concrete. A bridge whose deck is made of prestressed concrete but which is cable-stayed or suspended is not considered a prestressed concrete bridge; it is classed as a cable-stayed bridge or a suspension bridge.

== History ==
=== Beginnings ===
Reinforced concrete came into use in the last years of the 19th century. It is a composite material in which the concrete takes the compressive forces while the steel reinforcement works in tension. However, as concrete cannot stretch as much as the reinforcement, microcracks appear around the bars, and the concrete only partly returns to its initial state when the load is removed. These microcracks let water into the structure, which can eventually suffer serious damage.

To avoid these problems, Eugène Freyssinet had the idea of precompressing the concrete. In 1909, at Moulins, he tested the process by building a test arch with a span of 50 metres (160 ft), whose abutments were tied to each other by a prestressed tie. Concrete also undergoes creep, a slow deformation under a constant, permanent load that continues for many months or even years.

In 1928, Freyssinet decided to devote himself to the development of prestressed concrete. In October 1928, he and Jean Séailles filed a joint patent for a "process for manufacturing reinforced concrete parts" (Procédé de fabrication de pièces en béton armé). In 1934, Freyssinet demonstrated the effectiveness of his technique by saving the maritime station at Le Havre, which was then under construction on unstabilised fill and was gradually sinking. He did the same in Algeria in 1936, at the Oued Fodda pipe factory, which specialised in watertight pipes for high water pressures.

The process attracted the interest of the director of the German firm Wayss & Freytag. The first prestressed concrete bridge with bonded prestressing was thus built in 1938, to Freyssinet's designs, at Oelde on the Autobahn from Dortmund to Hanover. It was followed in 1941 by another motorway bridge about 50 kilometres (31 mi) east of Wrocław (then Breslau), towards Katowice, crossing the Neisse. This 42-metre (138 ft) structure was still in perfect condition in 1994.

In 1939, Freyssinet invented the anchorage cone and the tensioning jack. This major advance made it easier to tension the reinforcement and so made it possible to prestress structures of all kinds and sizes. This type of prestressing is called post-tensioning.

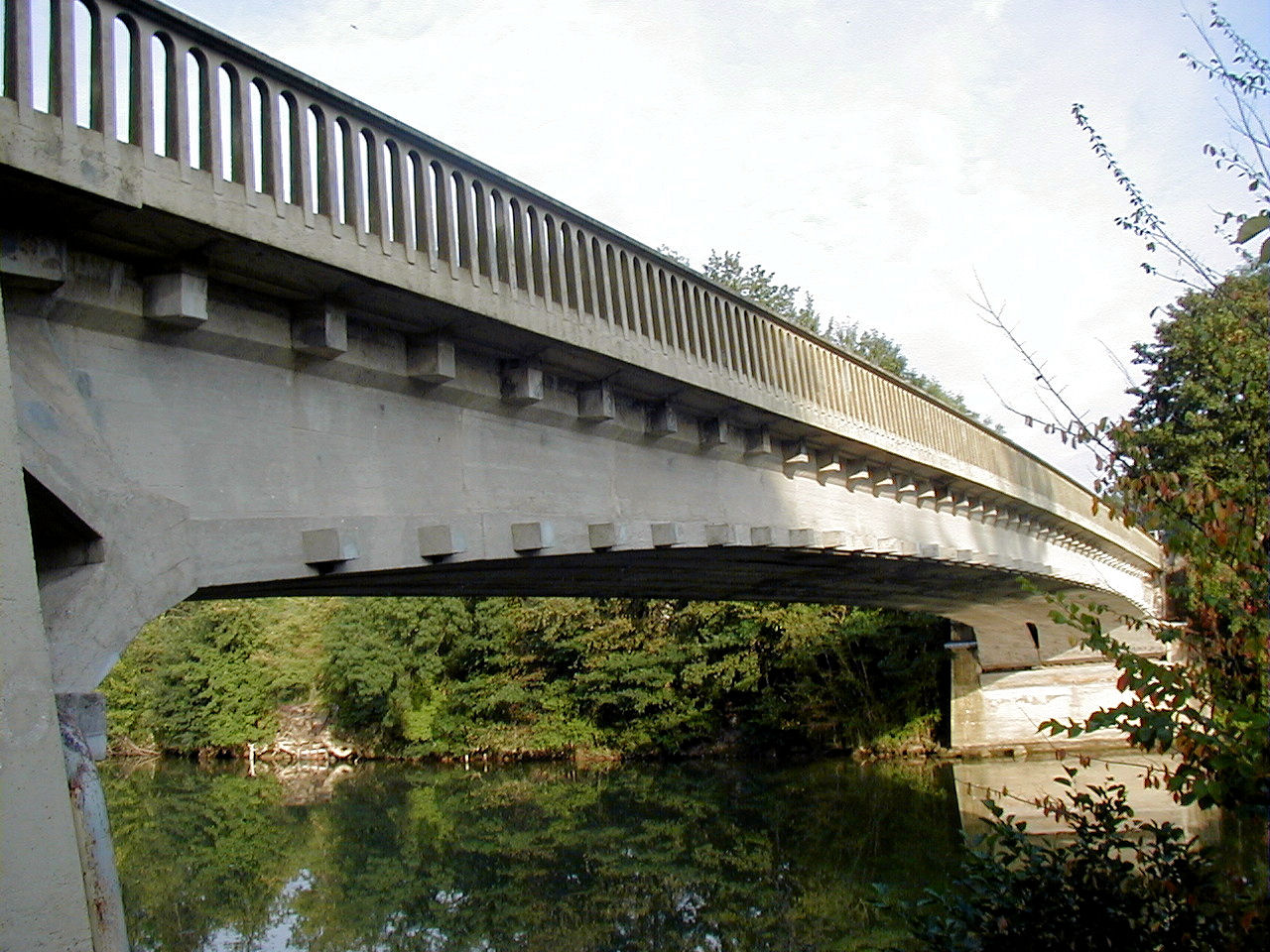
Luzancy Bridge

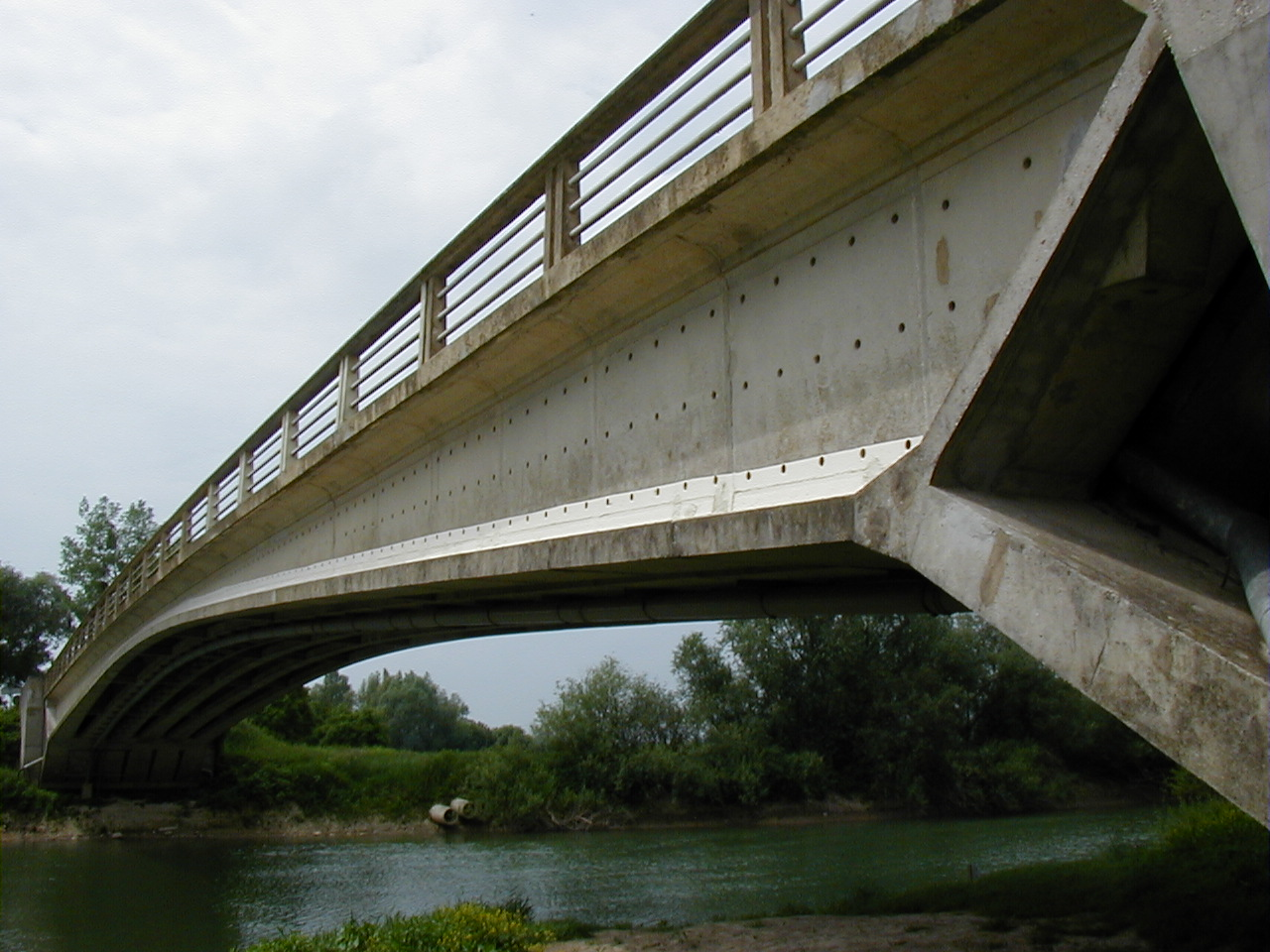
Trilbardou Bridge over the Marne

Freyssinet built few structures during the Second World War: a 10-metre (33 ft) bridge at Elbeuf-sur-Andelle in 1942, a 20-metre (66 ft) bridge at Longroy and a railway footbridge in the Pas-de-Calais, but above all the Luzancy Bridge, which was opened on 2 May 1946. The structure has a clearance of only 1.30 metres (4 ft 3 in) for a span of 54 metres (177 ft); only a suspension bridge could otherwise have met these constraints. Prestressing allowed Freyssinet to propose an extremely flat arch. The deck is carried by three box girders, each made of 22 segments that were precast next to the site and then assembled and tensioned by post-tensioning. Between 1947 and 1950, a series of five identical bridges designed by Freyssinet, with a span of 74 metres (243 ft), was built over the Marne at Esbly, Ussy-sur-Marne, Changis-sur-Marne, Trilbardou and Annet-sur-Marne.

Edme Campenon had founded the Société technique pour l'utilisation de la précontrainte (STUP) in 1943 to give Freyssinet the independence he needed and to allow him to exploit his patents with other companies. Between 1945 and 1950, about ten medium-sized bridges (20 to 50 metres (160 ft)) were built, all of them in the eastern Pyrenees and the Grenoble area, some by Sainrapt et Brice, but also by the Pascal and Dalberto companies, among others. Freyssinet then won a competition to build several bridges over the Marne, which were built between 1949 and 1950.

In the early 1950s, the Coignet company patented a new process, which was first tried on the bridge at Vaux-sur-Seine. Until then, prestressing cables were tensioned by anchoring them at one end, pulling them and then anchoring them at the other end. The resulting movement could be quite large, and the longer the beam, the more friction could alter the distribution of the tension. Constructions Coignet devised a method of anchoring the cables at both ends and then prestressing them by pushing them apart. The process required running the cables through the hollow of the box girder, which was later called external prestressing.

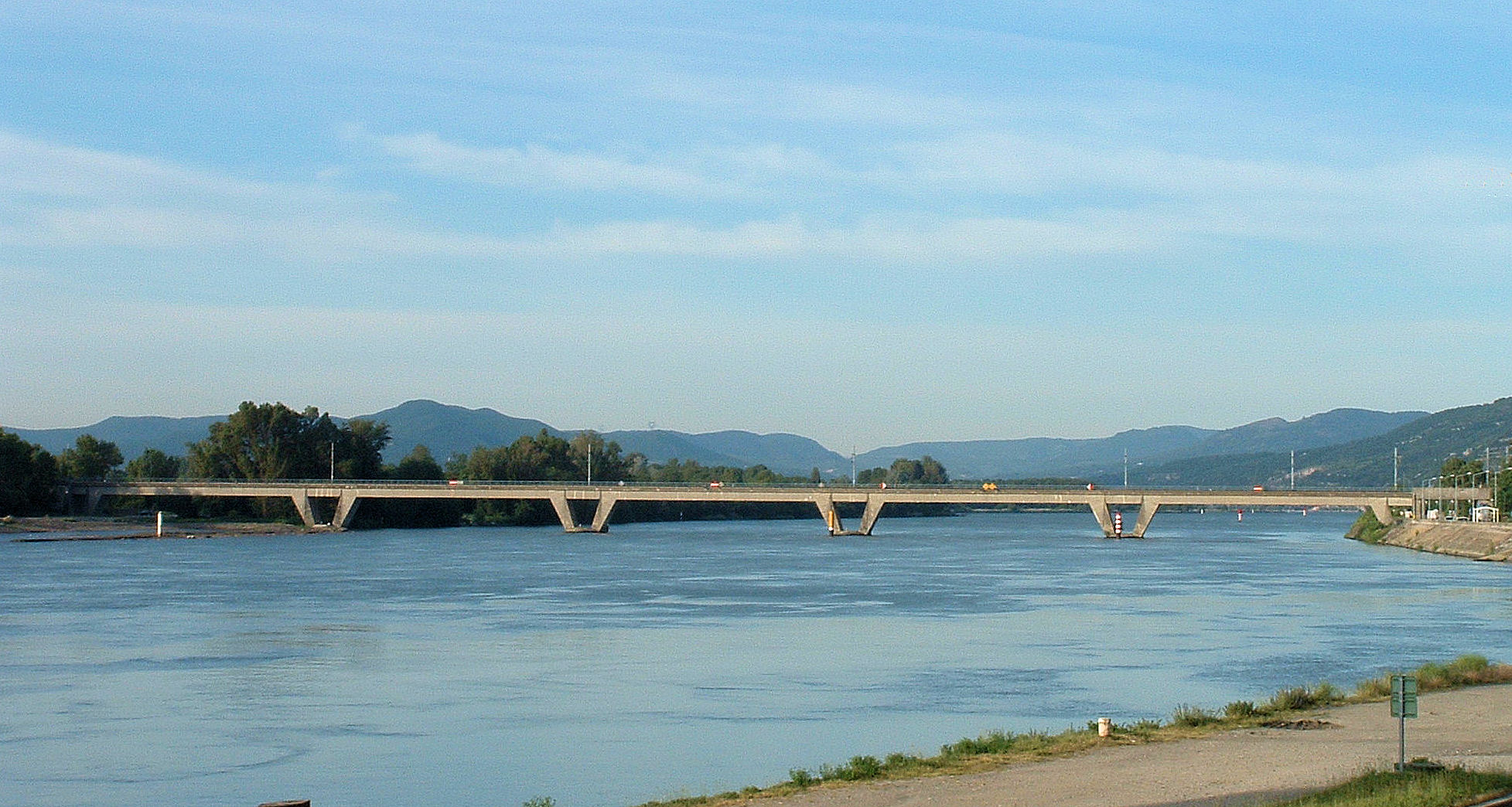
The La Voulte Viaduct over the Rhône

Until the end of the 1950s, a few such bridges were built in France, including the La Voulte Viaduct at La Voulte-sur-Rhône, the first large French railway bridge in prestressed concrete, designed by Nicolas Esquillan. With five spans of 56 metres (184 ft) and a length of 300 metres (980 ft), it was then the longest bridge of its kind in the world.

=== 1960s: the spread of prestressing ===
To meet the needs of reconstruction after the destruction of the Second World War and the continuous growth of road traffic, bridges had to be built quickly and with as little material as possible. New techniques were invented.

==== Segments cast in place ====
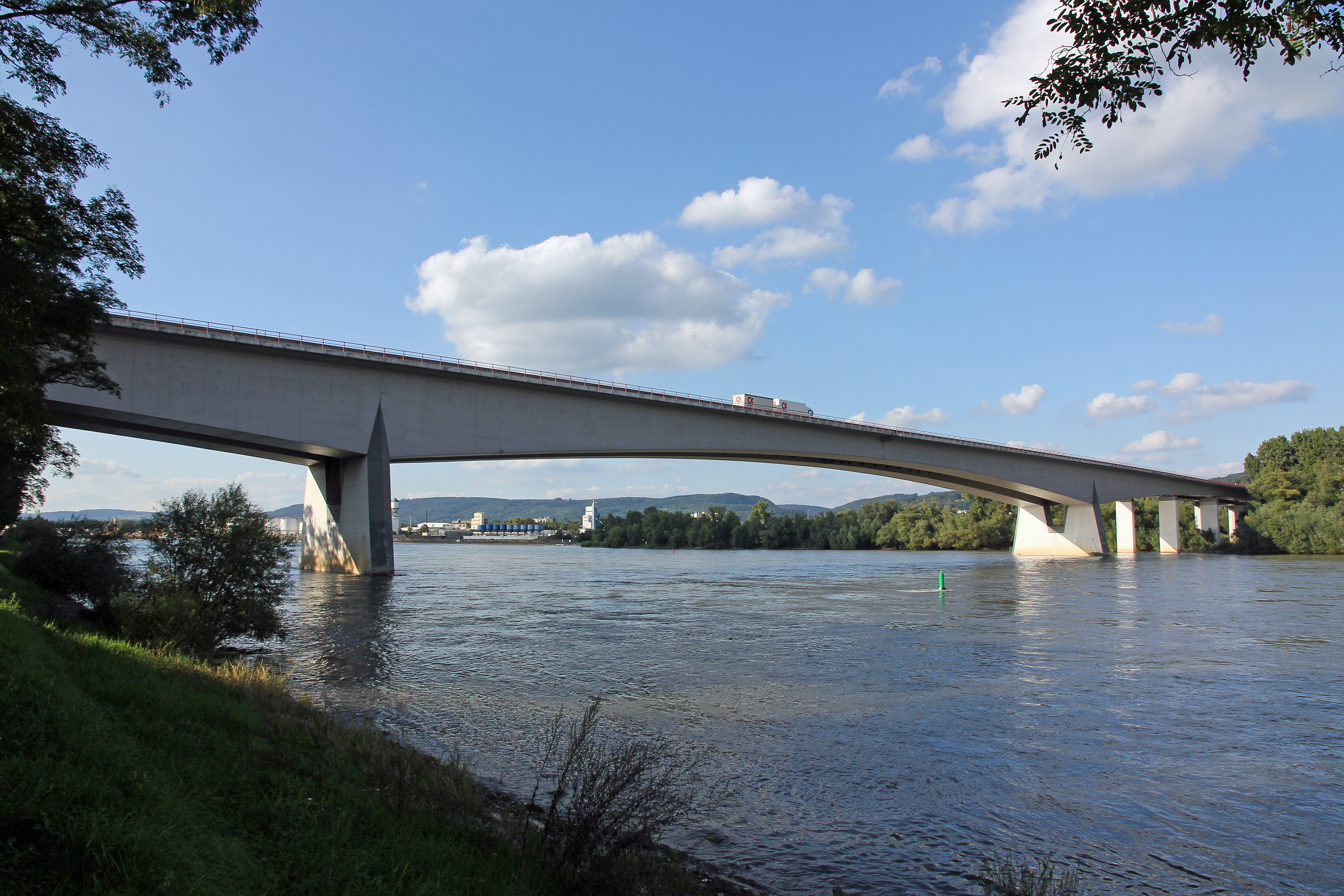
The Bendorf Bridge over the Rhine

In Germany, Ulrich Finsterwalder, head of the main construction office of Dyckerhoff & Widmann, first used prestressed cantilever construction in 1950 for the bridge over the Lahn at Balduinstein, completed in 1951, and then for the bridge over the Moselle at Koblenz, built from 1952 to 1954. Each pier carried a mobile rig with which segments were cast symmetrically on either side of it. This construction method made it possible to build the Bendorf Bridge over the Rhine between 1962 and 1965, with a span of 208 metres (682 ft).

In France, the technique was used for the Savines Bridge, completed in 1960, which is 924 metres (3,031 ft) long, with eleven spans of 77 metres (253 ft) and two end spans of 38.5 metres (126 ft). Many other structures were then built with this technique.

==== Precast girders ====
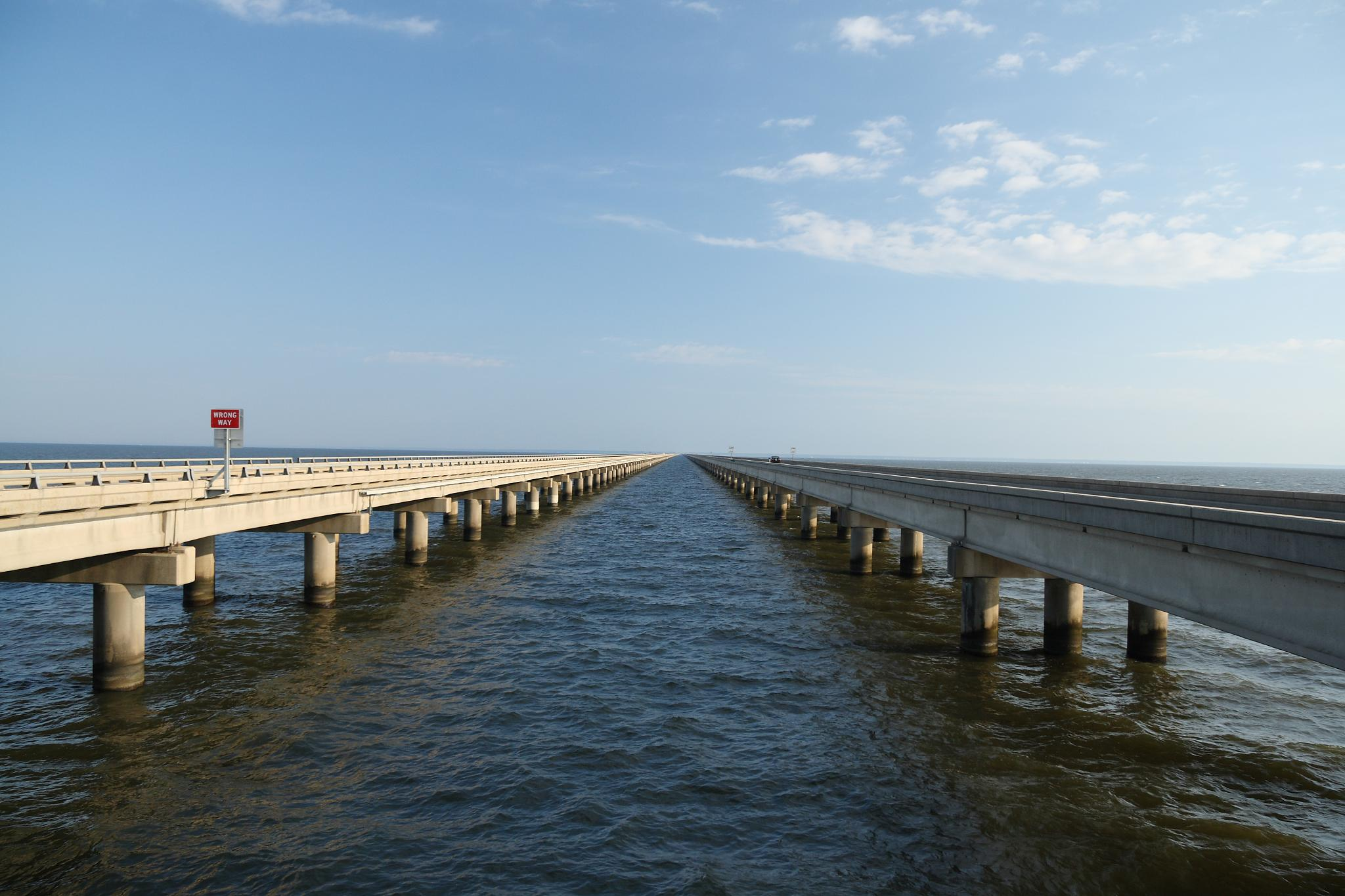
Lake Pontchartrain Causeway

Although casting segments in place was a step forward, each segment had to wait for the previous one to harden. The Ballot company built the Roberval Viaduct, a few kilometres north of Senlis, with precast prestressed girders 34 metres (112 ft) long; it was completed in 1965.

The length of precast girders limits their span to about 40 or 50 metres (160 ft), although longer bridges can be built by placing short spans end to end. Palmer and Baker, together with the Fougerolle company and under a STUP licence, built what was then the longest bridge in the world, over Lake Pontchartrain north of New Orleans: the Lake Pontchartrain Causeway is 38 kilometres (24 mi) long, with 2,232 spans of 17 metres (56 ft), and was built at a rate of 100 metres (330 ft) of bridge per day. The precast spans of the approach viaducts of the Tancarville Bridge are 50 metres (160 ft) long.

==== Precast segments ====
The spans of the Oléron Viaduct, built by Campenon Bernard and completed in 1966, reach 80 metres (260 ft). It is made up of 860 precast segments. Five years later, the Noirmoutier Bridge reached a span of 88 metres (289 ft).

The bridge over the Grand Canal of Alsace, built by Coignet between 1977 and 1979 with precast segments, has a main span of 171.87 metres (563.9 ft).

=== Prestressing today ===
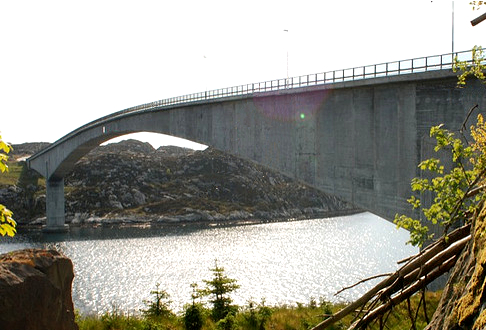
Stolma Bridge

In Norway, the Stolma Bridge at Austevoll, a prestressed concrete box girder bridge completed in 1998, has a span of 301 metres (988 ft).

Concrete arch bridges allow even longer spans, but their arches are made of reinforced concrete. A span of 390 metres (1,280 ft) was reached in 1980 with the Krk Bridge in Croatia. It was exceeded by the Wanxian Bridge over the Yangtze in China, which has a span of 420 metres (1,380 ft) and was built in 1997 by first erecting a tubular steel structure that was then filled with concrete and encased in concrete.

== Description ==
Concrete has useful mechanical properties in compression, while its tensile strength is limited, so that tension quickly causes it to crack and fail. Prestressing consists of tensioning the steel reinforcement of the concrete, and therefore of compressing the concrete while the structure is at rest. When the structure is loaded, the reinforcement lengthens and the concrete tends to decompress, without going into tension, since it was already partly compressed.

Depending on whether the reinforcement is tensioned before or after the concrete has hardened, a distinction is made between pre-tensioning and post-tensioning.

=== Pre-tensioning ===
In pre-tensioning, the reinforcement is tensioned before the concrete is cast. Once the concrete has hardened, the reinforcement is released, which puts the concrete into compression through bond alone.

=== Post-tensioning ===
In post-tensioning, the prestressing cables are placed in ducts embedded in the concrete. Once the concrete has hardened, the cables are tensioned by means of jacks so as to compress the structure at rest.

=== Extradosed prestressing ===
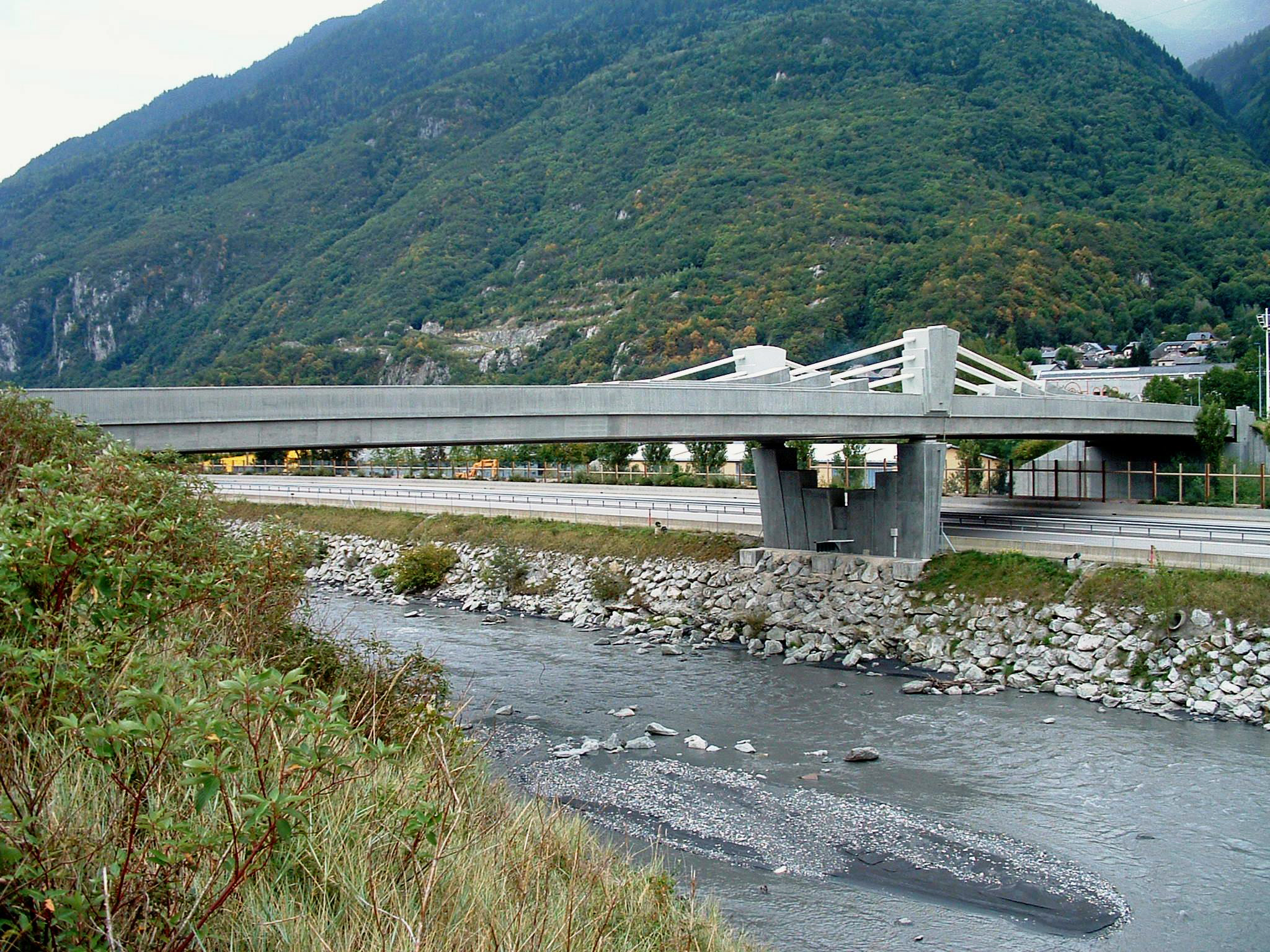
Bridge at Saint-Rémy-de-Maurienne over the Arc and the A43 motorway

In continuous decks, the bending moments over the supports under loads spread over several spans can be twice those at mid-span. To make the continuity prestressing more effective, Jacques Mathivat proposed increasing the distance between the centre line of the girder over the supports and the prestressing cables, by taking the cables out above the deck: this is extradosed prestressing. This type of solution was used in France for a road bridge at Saint-Rémy-de-Maurienne. Several extradosed bridges have been built in Japan, including the Kiso River Bridge, the Odawara Blue Way Bridge and the Shin-Meisei Bridge. This type of structure lies between the prestressed concrete girder bridge, in which the cables are inside the deck (within the concrete or outside it), and the cable-stayed bridge.

=== Under-slung prestressing ===
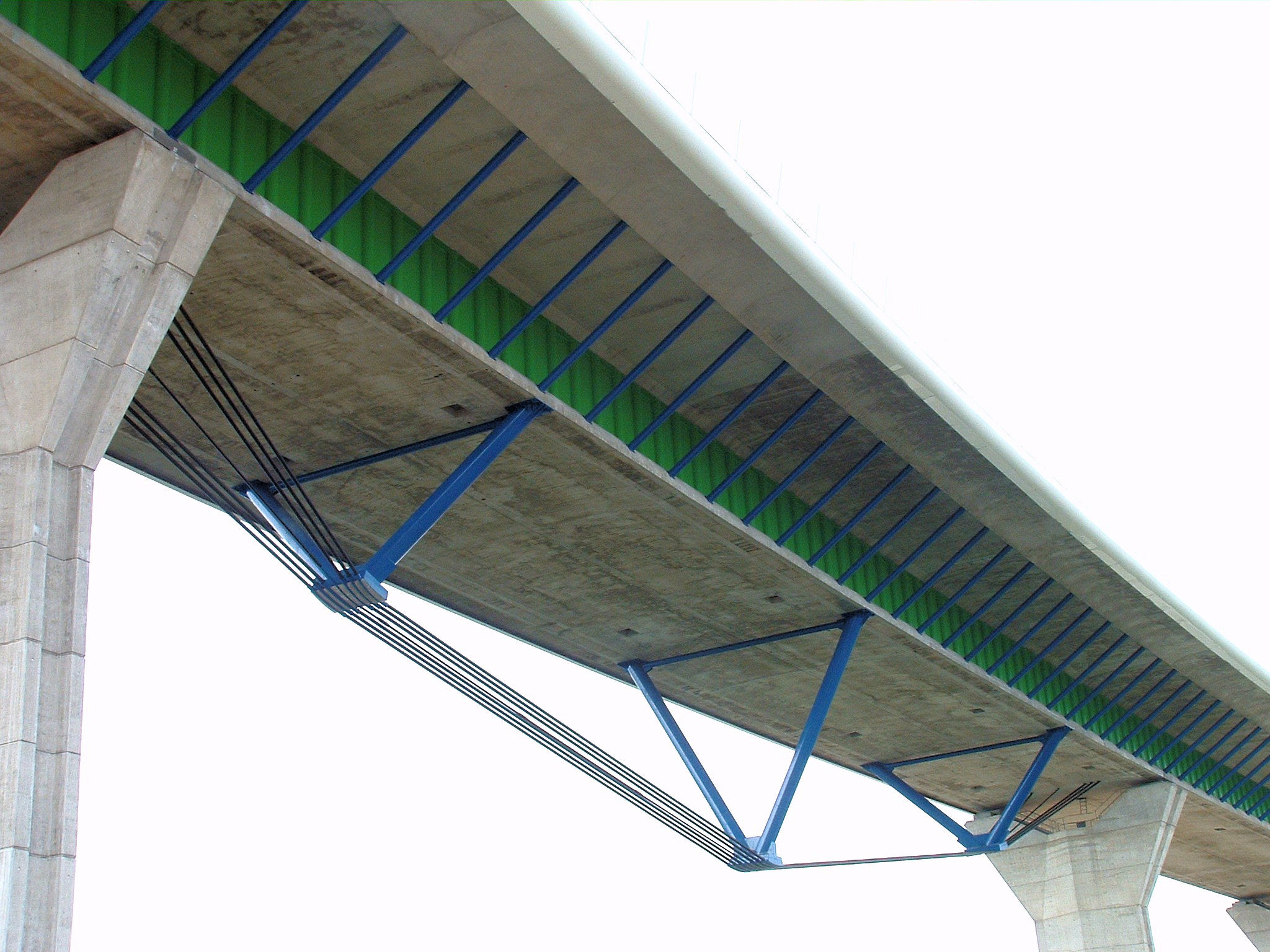
Meaux Viaduct

Another solution has been proposed for increasing the span of one bay while keeping the deck depth adopted for the rest of the deck, which has shorter spans. Michel Placidi adopted it for the Meaux Viaduct over the Marne, whose main span is under-slung.

=== Corrugated steel webs ===
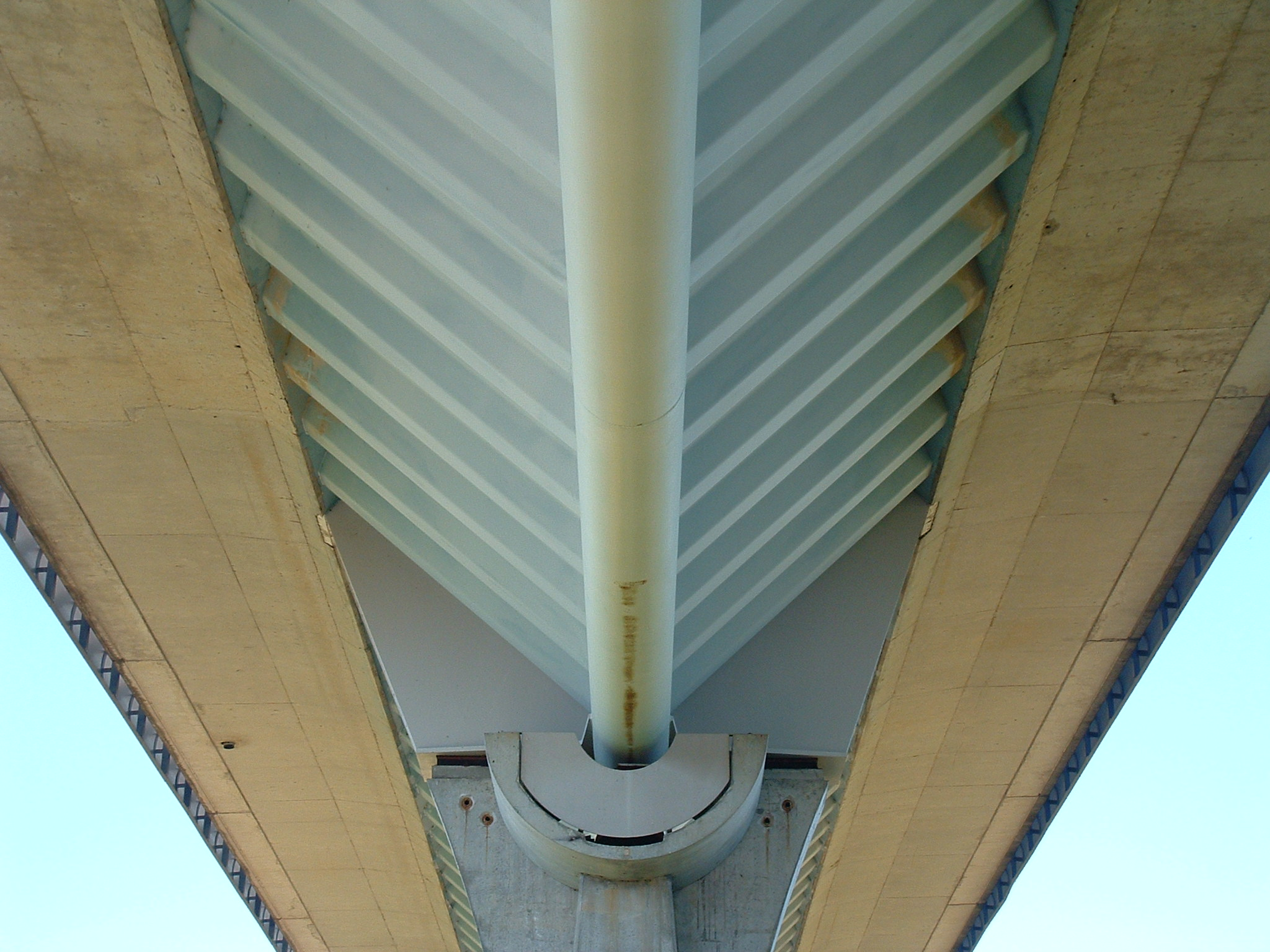
Corrugated steel webs of the Maupré Viaduct

For road bridges, the self-weight of the deck makes up most of the load. Moreover, in a box girder, the webs reduce the geometric efficiency of the section. In bridges with corrugated steel webs, the concrete webs of a box girder are replaced by corrugated steel plates. These webs carry shear forces without taking up the compression due to prestressing, which then acts only on the concrete slabs and is therefore more efficient. This solution has been used for several bridges in Japan. In France, it was used for the Corniche bridge at Dole.

=== Trusses ===
Concrete trusses were used for the Mangfall Bridge designed by Ulrich Finsterwalder, and for the Sylans Viaduct and the Glacières Viaduct on the A40 motorway, built by Bouygues. The superstructure of the Bubiyan Bridge in Kuwait is a three-dimensional truss made of precast concrete segments with external post-tensioning. Steel trusses were used for the bridge at Arbois, built by Dragages et Travaux Publics with Michel Placidi, and for the Bras de la Plaine Bridge on Réunion.

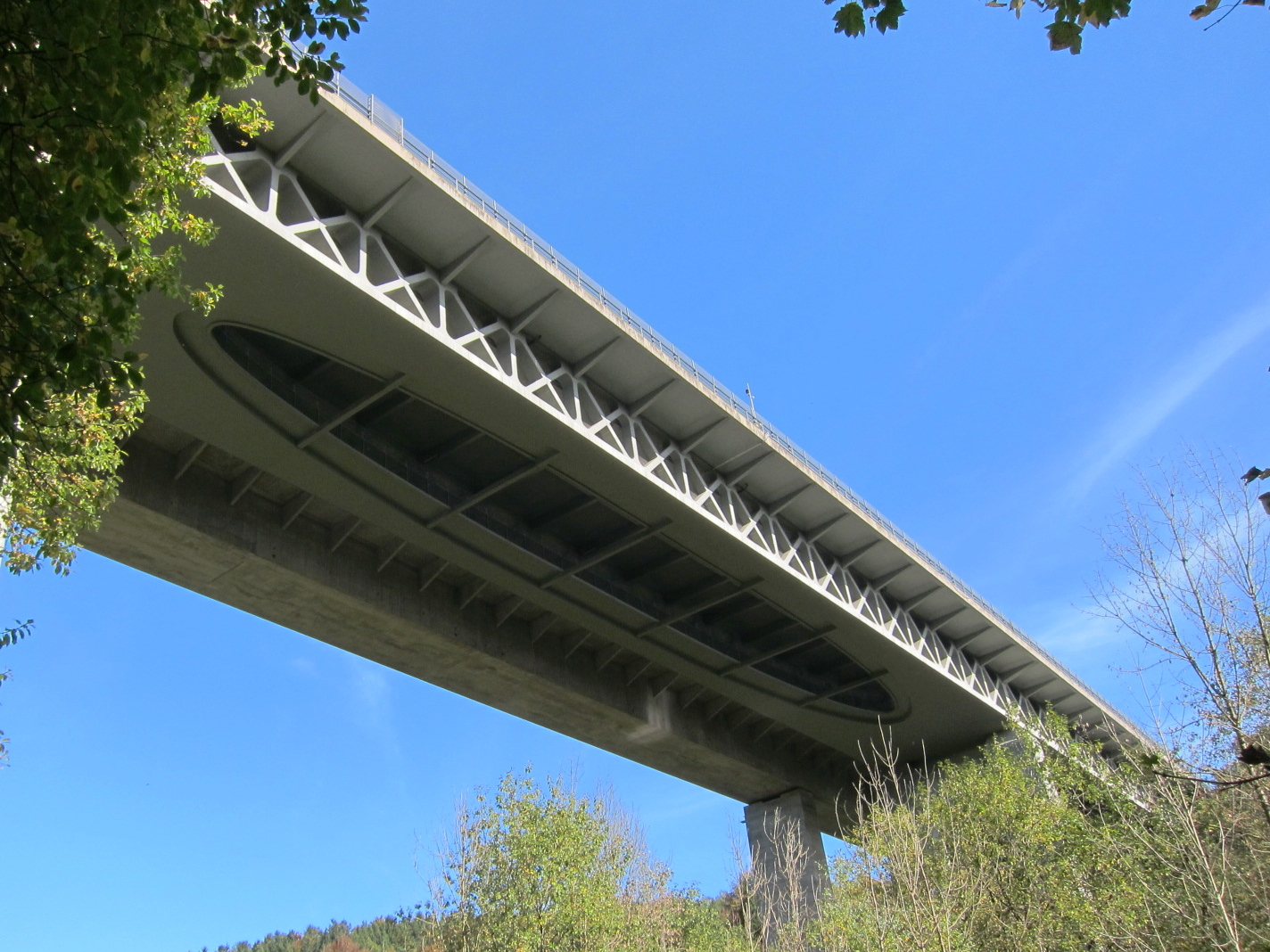
Mangfall Bridge

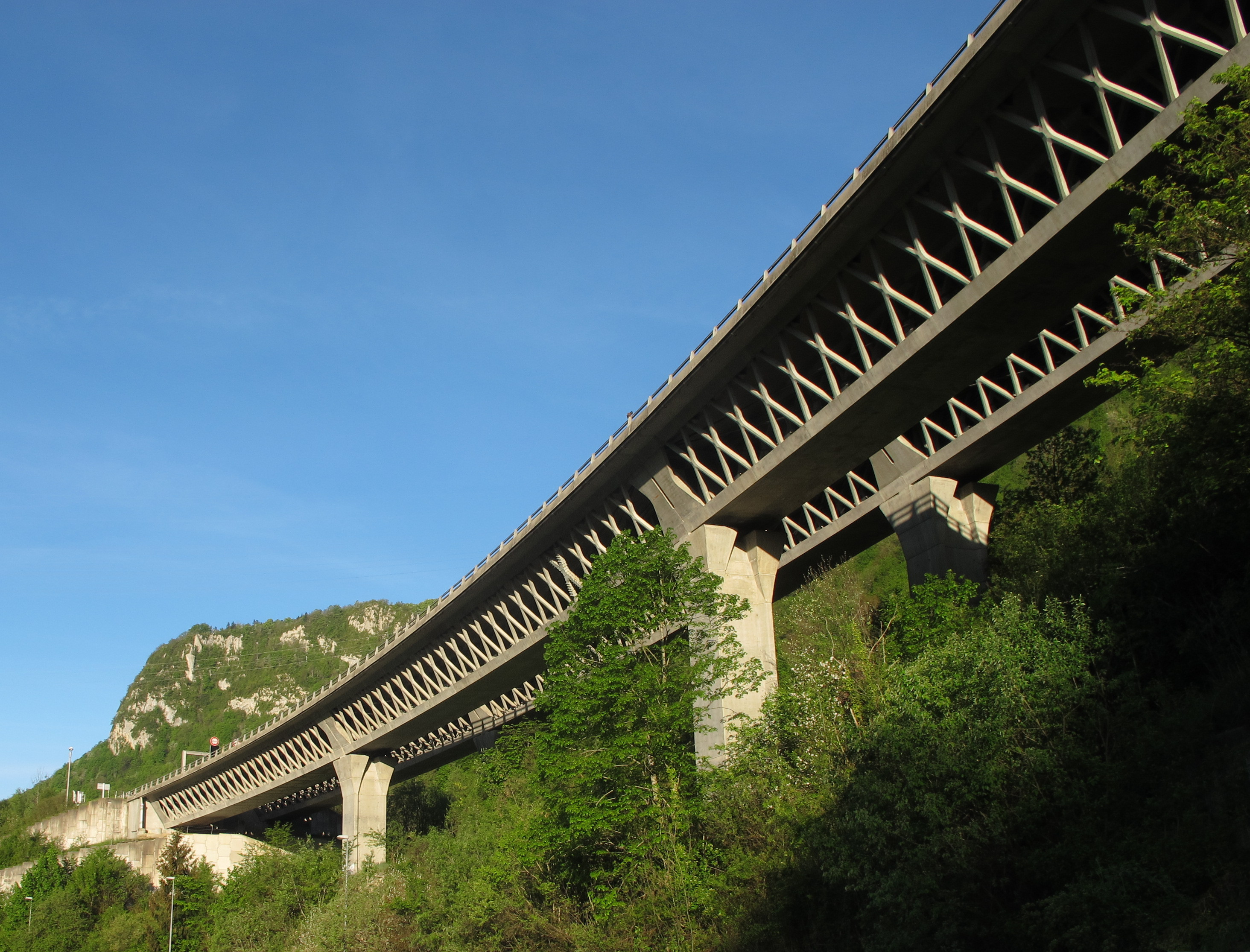
Glacières Viaduct

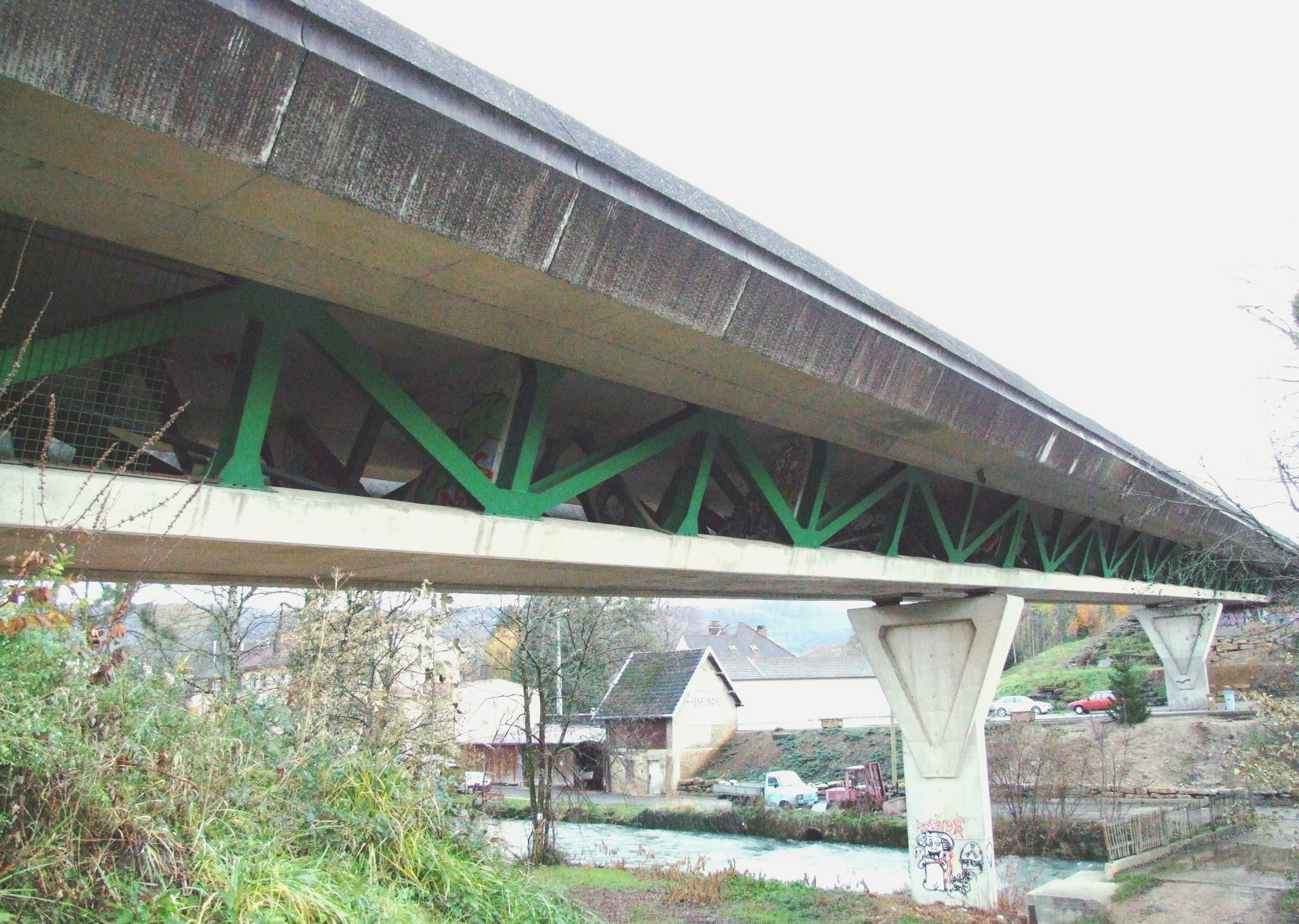
Bridge at Arbois over the Cuisance

== Types ==
=== Slab bridges ===
Prestressed concrete slab bridge (PSI-DP)

Slab bridges are the most widely built type of bridge in France. Most of them are road and motorway overpasses and underpasses, and fewer are railway bridges. In the terminology of the Sétra, a prestressed slab bridge is a passage supérieur ou inférieur en dalle précontrainte (PSI-DP): a slab of constant thickness, prestressed longitudinally and reinforced transversely, with one or more spans. Its cross-section usually includes cantilevers.

Depth-to-span ratios of prestressed slab bridges (PSI-DP), according to the Sétra design guide
Single span	Two spans	Three or more spans
1/22 to 1/25	1/28 (a); 1/25 (b)	1/33 (a); 1/28 (b)

Ratios of slab thickness to the longest span. (a) Rectangular slabs; (b) slabs with wide cantilevers.

Prestressed slabs are used for spans of 14 to 25 metres (82 ft), or even 30 metres (98 ft); slabs with wide cantilevers are the economical choice for spans of more than about 20 metres (66 ft). Beyond 25 metres (82 ft), a single-rib slab of variable depth or a slab with several ribs is generally chosen.

With continuous cables, prestressing runs over the whole length of the deck up to a total length of about 80 metres (260 ft). It is possible to go up to 100 metres (330 ft), but the losses of prestress caused by the friction of the cables in their ducts during tensioning can then be significant.

The deck of this type of bridge is generally cast on falsework, but in some cases it can also be put in place by launching. Long structures can be built in phases, reusing the falsework and formwork, without expansion joints up to a length of 150 metres (490 ft).

=== Girder bridges ===
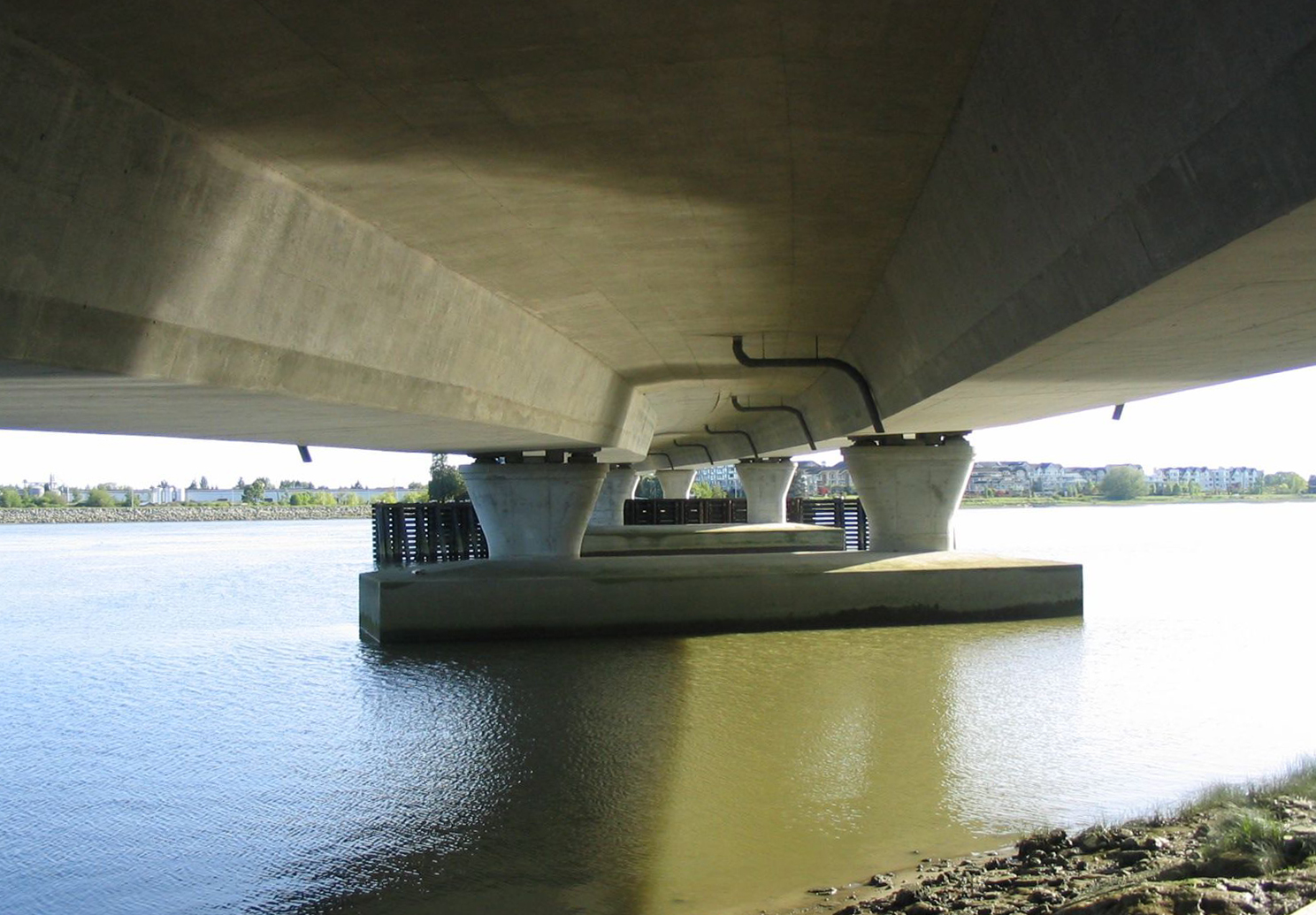
Prestressed concrete box girder bridge

Bridge with girders pre-tensioned by bond (PRAD)

Bridge with post-tensioned precast girders (VIPP)

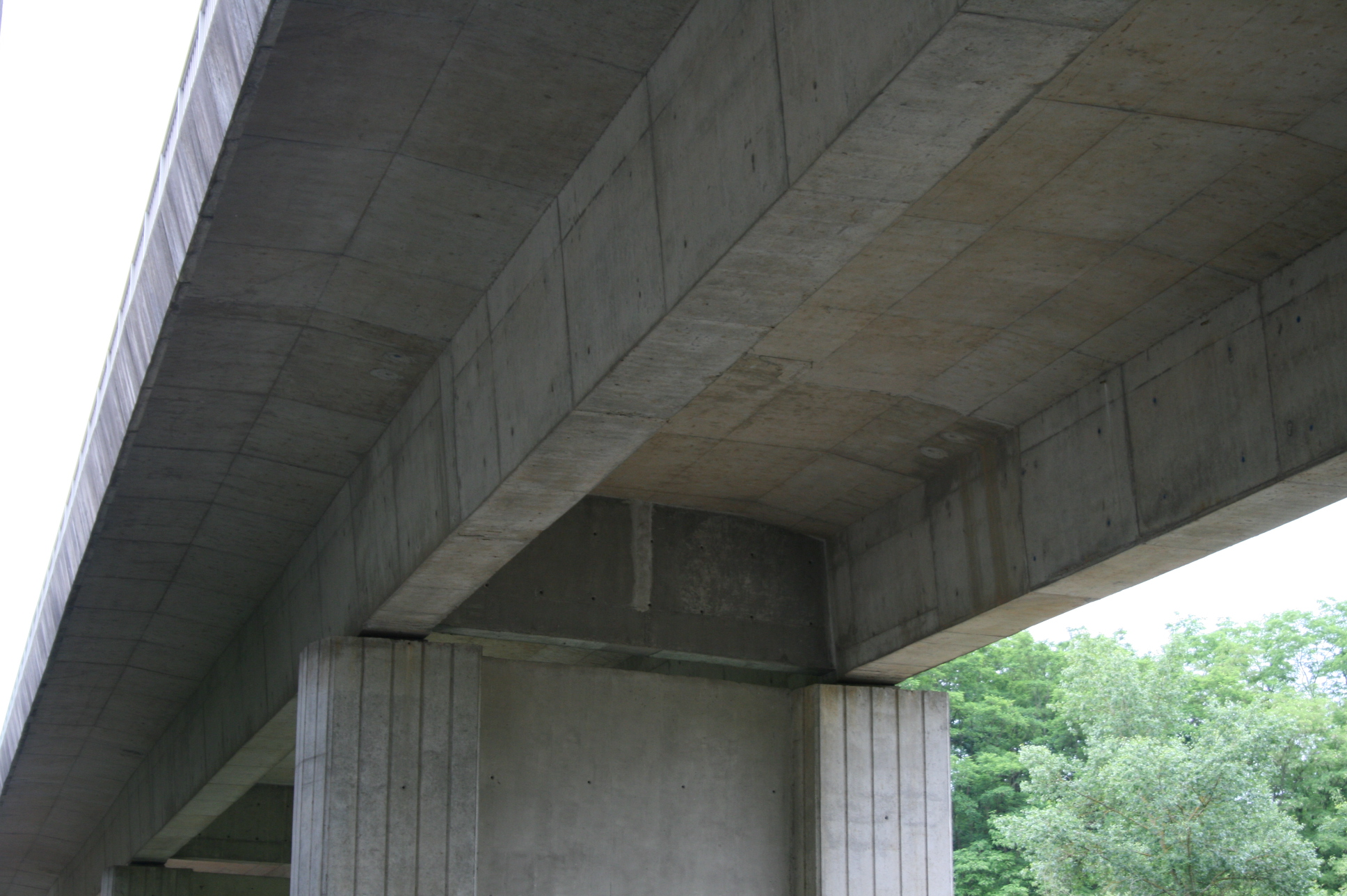
Prestressed concrete ribbed girder bridge

== Construction methods ==
=== Casting on falsework ===
Casting the deck on falsework is common for short spans, generally in reinforced concrete. Prestressed slab bridges are generally cast on falsework.

=== Movable scaffolding systems ===
A movable scaffolding system (MSS) is used to cast bridge decks a whole span at a time. It generally rests on the piers. The girders carrying the formwork can be placed under the formwork (underslung MSS) or above it (overhead MSS).

=== Moving the deck into place ===
Bridge decks can be built on site next to their final position and then moved into place by launching (a longitudinal movement), by transverse sliding, or by rotation.

==== Launching ====
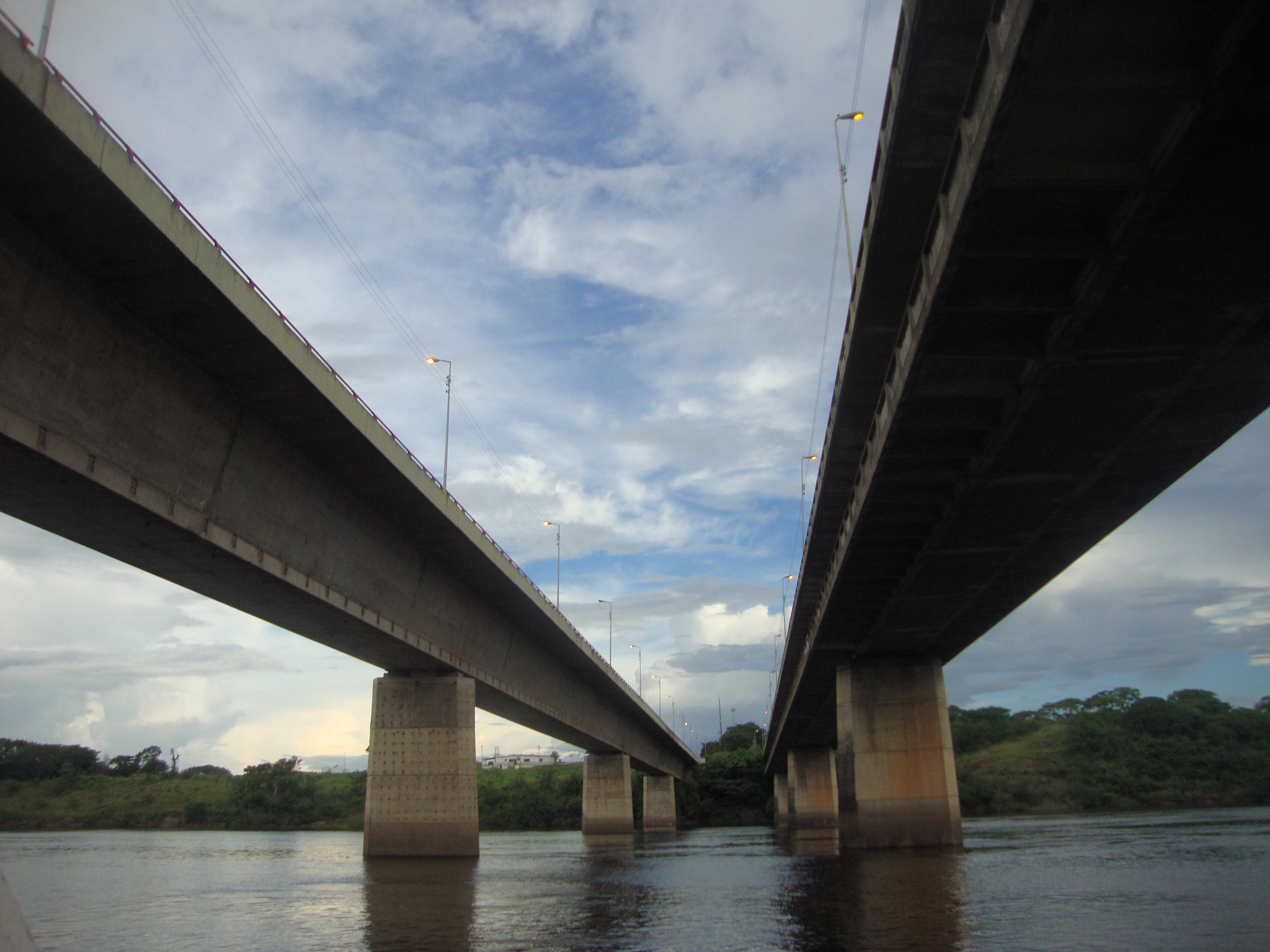
First and second bridges over the Caroní River

Building a deck on one bank and then moving it into its final position by pushing or pulling is an old process. For a prestressed concrete deck, it was used in 1962 for the bridge over the Caroní River in Venezuela, designed by Fritz Leonhardt and his colleague Willi Baur. Its spans are 96 metres (315 ft).

The method as it is applied today was first used in 1965 for the Inn Bridge at Kufstein, Austria, also designed by Leonhardt and Baur. It has the following features:

- the deck is cast in sections in a fixed formwork behind the abutment;
- a lightweight steel launching nose is fitted to the front of the deck;
- each section is cast directly against the previous one, after that one has been launched;
- during launching, the deck is only partly prestressed;
- the final prestressing is applied once launching is finished.

The method was patented in 1967. Züblin obtained a patent in 1968, and in France the CITRA company obtained one in 1970.

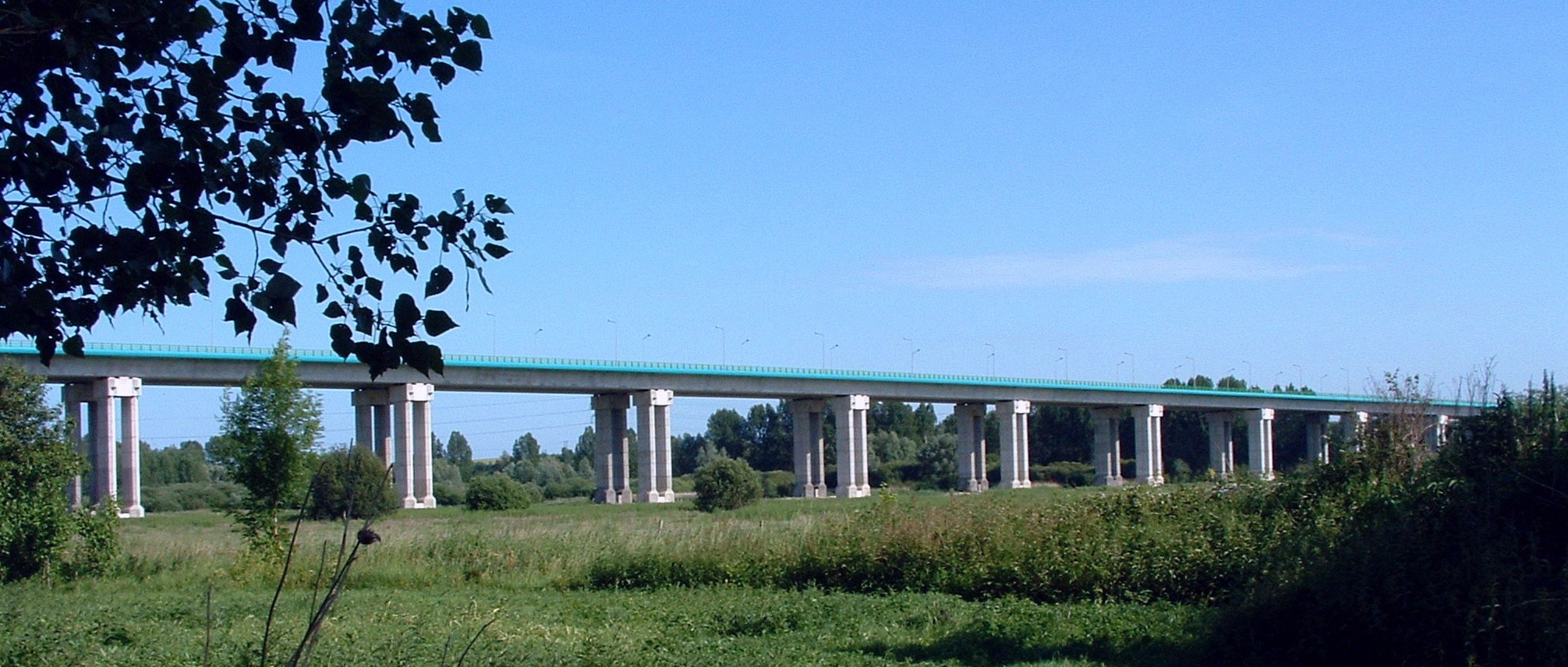
Jules Verne Viaduct, Amiens

For the Jules Verne Viaduct on the north-eastern ring road of Amiens, France, opened in 1987, the weight moved was 15,300 tonnes (15,100 long tons; 16,900 short tons) and the force applied was 1,000 tonnes-force.

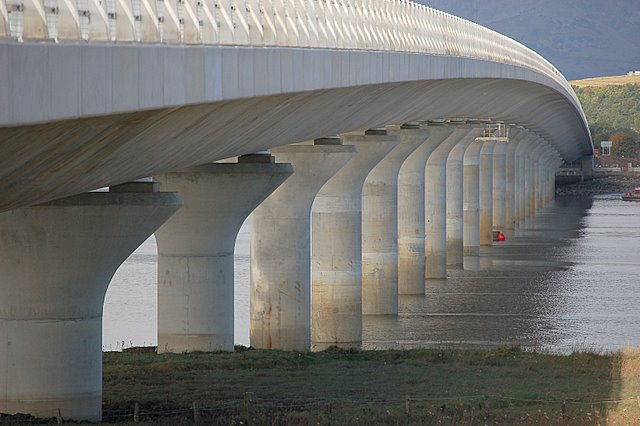
Clackmannanshire Bridge

The Clackmannanshire Bridge in Scotland, built by Vinci and Morgan Est between 2006 and 2008, is 1,190 metres (3,900 ft) long and was built by incremental launching.

The Sart canal bridge in Belgium, 498 metres (1,634 ft) long and built between 1998 and 2002, was also launched; the maximum weight moved was 65,000 tonnes (64,000 long tons; 72,000 short tons).

Launching allows quasi-industrial construction, free from the constraints of the site.

==== Transverse sliding ====
The bridge is built next to its final position and is then slid sideways on air cushions.

==== Rotation ====
This technique is very rare: it is said to have been used about ten times in France, twice in Germany and once in Austria. One example is the Meylan footbridge in Isère, designed by Michel Placidi and completed in 1980.
