= Eugène Freyssinet =

French structural engineer (1879–1962)

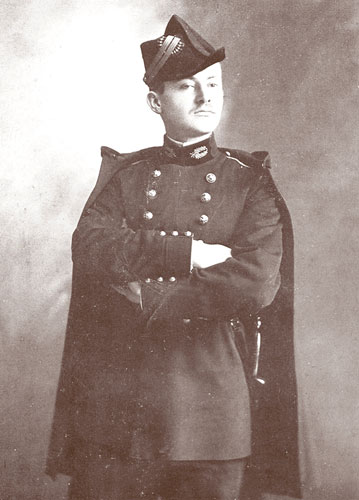
- Freyssinet in the uniform of the École Polytechnique
- Born: 13 July 1879; Objat, Corrèze, France
- Died: 8 June 1962 (aged 82); Saint-Martin-Vésubie, France
- Engineering career
- Discipline: Structural engineer, civil engineer
- Institutions: Institution of Structural Engineers
- Projects: Plougastel Bridge; Pont le Veurdre; Hangar d'Orly
- Significant advance: developments in prestressed concrete
- Awards: IStructE Gold Medal; Frank P. Brown Medal (1950); Wilhelm Exner Medal (1960)

Eugène Freyssinet (French: [øʒɛn fʁɛsinɛ]) (13 July 1879 – 8 June 1962) was a French structural and civil engineer. He was the major pioneer of prestressed concrete.

== Biography ==
Freyssinet was born in at Objat, Corrèze, France. He worked in the École Nationale des Ponts et Chaussées in Paris, France where he designed several bridges until the First World War intervened. His tutors included Charles Rabut. He served in the French Army from 1904 to 1907 and again from 1914 to 1918 as a road engineer.

His most significant early bridge was the three span Pont le Veurdre near Vichy, built in 1911. At the time, the 72.5 metre (238 ft) spans were the longest so far constructed in France although Grafton Bridge a 97.6 metre reinforced concrete bridge had been opened in April 1910 and the Rocky River Bridge in Cleveland Ohio, an 85.34 metre unreinforced bridge had been opened in October 1910.

Freyssinet's proposal was for three reinforced concrete truss spans, and was significantly less expensive than the standard masonry arch design. The design used jacks to raise and connect the arches, effectively introducing an element of prestress. The bridge also enabled Freyssinet to discover the phenomenon of creep in concrete, whereby the concrete deforms with time when placed under stress. Regarding this bridge, Freyssinet wrote: "I have always loved it more than any other of my bridges, and of all that the War has destroyed, it is the only one whose ruin has caused me real grief".

He served as the director of Public Works in Moulins starting in 1905. He also served as a road engineer in central France from 1907 until 1914.

Eugène achieved a significant breakthrough in thin-shell structures with the design of two huge and celebrated airship hangars at Villeneuve-Orly Airport in 1923. The principle of the corrugated form for the concrete shell was introduced there to obtain necessary stiffness for a 70m span. In 1924 he applied the same principle of corrugated shell roofing for two airplane hangars spanning 55m at Vélizy – Villacoublay.

Working for Claude Limousin until 1929, he designed a number of structures including a 96.2 m (315 ft) arch bridge at Villeneuve-sur-Lot, and several large thin-shell concrete roofs, including aircraft hangars at Istres, Bouches-du-Rhone in 1917 and 300-foot-wide, 200-foot-high twin dirigible sheds at Orly from 1916 to 1923. During the First World War he also built cargo ships using reinforced concrete at Rouen. Freyssinet's major contribution to the science of concrete construction was the use of forced steam around the concrete moulds which significantly shortened the curing time of the concrete.

His 1919 design at St-Pierre-du-Vauvray again increased the record for a concrete arch span, with 132 m (435 ft) hollow arches, completed in 1923. Also in 1919 his Pont De La Liberation in Villeneuve-sur-Lot was completed which was the largest single span in the world at 96.25 metres.

His largest structure was the Plougastel Bridge with three identical spans of 180 m (592 ft) each, completed in 1930. Here he studied creep in more detail, and developed his ideas of prestressing, taking out a patent in 1928.

Although Freyssinet did much to develop prestressed concrete, he was not its inventor. Other engineers such as Doehring had patented methods for prestressing as early as 1888, and Freyssinet's mentor Rabut built prestressed concrete corbels. Freyssinet's key contribution was to recognise that only high-strength prestressing wire could counteract the effects of creep and relaxation, and to develop anchorages and other technology which made the system flexible enough to be applied to many different types of structures.

Having left Limousin, he set up his own firm to build prestressed concrete electricity pylons, but the business failed.

In 1935, he used prestressing to consolidate the maritime station of Le Havre which was threatening to settle beyond repair. Freyssinet introduced prestressed concrete beams, and jacked up the shipyard buildings. Following this success, he joined the firm of Campenon-Bernard and went on to design several prestressed bridges.

Many of Freyssinet's designs were new and elaborate for his time—some of them so much so that they were never built, such as the Phare du Monde, a 2,300 foot tower planned for the 1937 World Fair in Paris. According to Leonardo Troyano, "his capacity for creation, invention and research and his non-conformity with existing ideas and doctrines made him one of the most notable engineers in the history of engineering".

== Key achievements or collaborations ==
- 1906: Pont de Moulin Neuf (in Ferrières-sur-Sichon)
- 1907: Pont de Prairéal-sur-Besbre
- 1909 : Freyssinet Test Arch in Moulins (a test for prestressed concrete before the construction of three road bridges over the Allier River)
- 1911-1912: Pont du Veurdre (demolished in 1944 by French Resistance),
- 1913: Bridge Boutiron, à Creuzier le Vieux, near Vichy,
- 1910-1919: Pont de Villeneuve-sur-Lot
- 1914-1923: Pont de Châtel-de-Neuvre (demolished in 1940 by French Army),
- 1922-1930: Pont Albert-Louppe across the Élorn between Plougastel-Daoulas and Brest
- 1922-1923: Pont de Saint-Pierre-du-Vauvray
- 1922: Pont de Tonneins across the Garonne,
- 1923: Airships hangars of the Orly Airport
- 1927-1929: the Halle Freyssinet or Halle messengers of the Gare d'Austerlitz in Paris
- 1927-1929: Les Halles "Le Boulingrin" in Reims
- 1926-1928: Factory of the Compagnie nationale des radiateurs de Dammarie-lès-Lys (Seine-et-Marne)
- 1933-1935: renovation of the ferry terminal of Havre
- 1934-1940: Église Saint-Jacques-le-Majeur de Montrouge
- 1936: Aqueduct at Fodda, in Algeria
- 1937-1941: Steel gates on the Barrage at Béni Badhel, Algeria,
- 1938: Bridge on the Autobahn 2 Oelde in Warendorf in Germany, the first prestressed concrete bridge in the country.
- 1941-1946: pont de Luzancy on the Marne (Seine-et-Marne), 54 m (177 ft) span,
- 1946-1951: Orleans Reservoir
- 1947-1950: series of five similar bridges on the Marne (74 m (243 ft) span) to Esbly Ussy-sur-Marne Changis -over Marne Trilbardou and Annet-sur-Marne (Seine-et-Marne)
- 1947 and 1953: runway at Orly airport
- 1948-1951: cut and cover of Rouen,
- 1951-1953: Three overpasses on the highway to Caracas La Guaira, Venezuela
- 1954: Reconstruction and consolidation of the roof of the issuer of l'émetteur d'Europe 1 à Felsberg, Sarre,
- 1955: water pipe sealed Kunu, India
- 1955-1957: Viaduct access pont de Tancarville, the left bank,
- 1955-1958: basilique Saint-Pie X in Lourdes with the architects Pierre Vago and André Le Donne.
- 1955-1961: a multiple-arch dam on the river Erraguene Djen-Djen, Algeria,
- 1957: Bridge No. 10 on the N7 at Orly
- 1957: Pont Saint-Michel à Toulouse,
- 1961-1964: Reservoir des Lilas in Paris
- 1961-1964: Gladesville Bridge, Australia.
