= Château de Montgilbert =

Ruined medieval fortress in Ferrières-sur-Sichon in the Allier département of France

Coordinates: 46°2′18.7″N 3°37′24.7″E

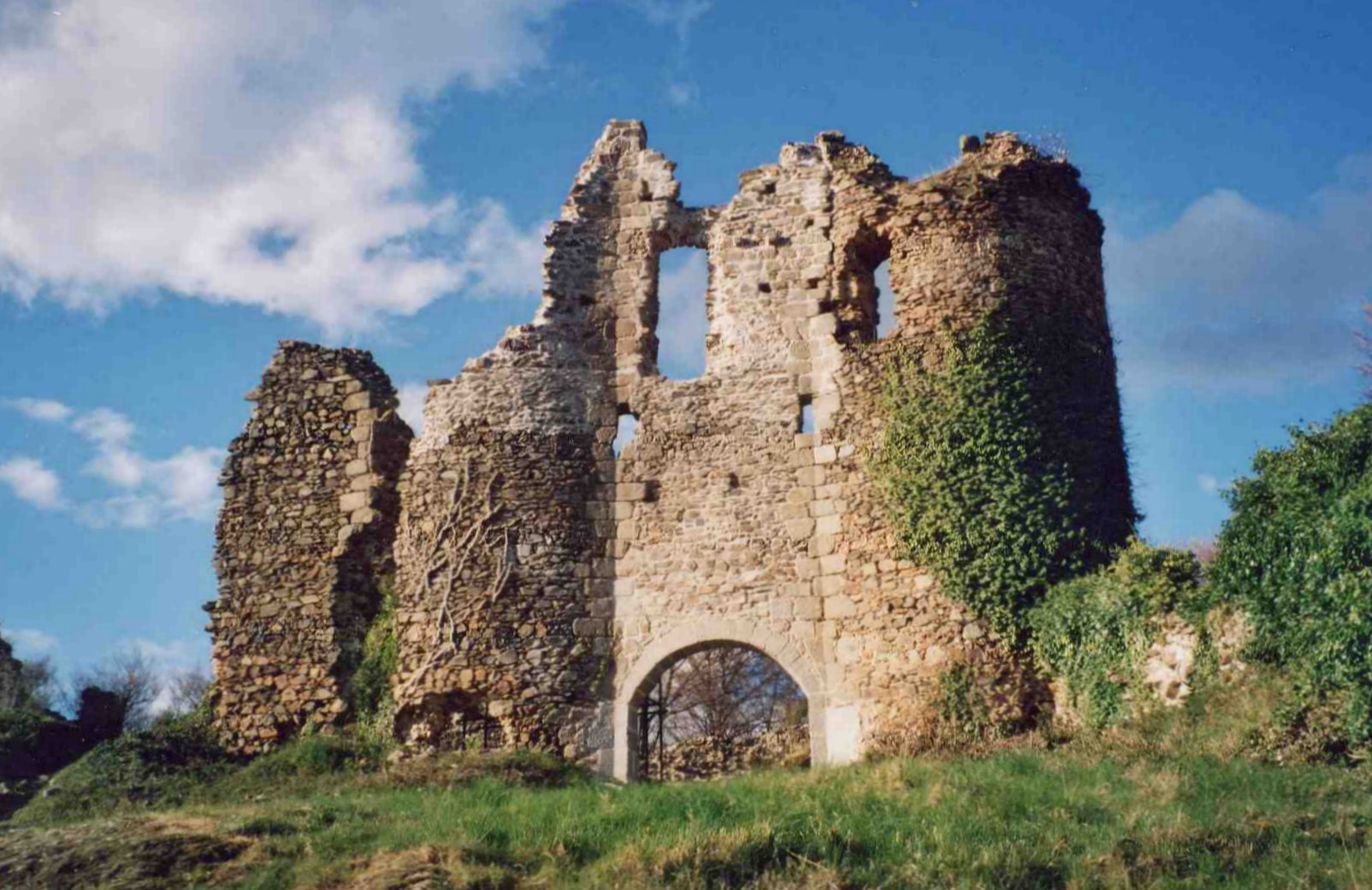
Châtelet and gatehouse at the entry of the high courtyard

The Château de Montgilbert is a ruined medieval fortress located in the commune of Ferrières-sur-Sichon, 25 km to the south-east of Vichy in the Allier département of France.

== Architecture ==
Built during the 13th century, the Château de Montgilbert is located at the top of a rocky hillock in one of the turns of the Vareille, a brook feeding the Sichon, a small tributary of the Allier.

It is composed of two concentric walls. The external fortification, adapted for ground combat, reinforces the defences (towers, arrow slits) in the gently sloped west and south sides, and delimits a low courtyard that contained the servants' quarters. This enclosure was expanded during the 15th century with artillery batteries and a bastion with thick walls that covered the overexposed original entry.

The inner, approximately square, fortification comprises round towers at each corner, where arches (chapel) are still visible. Square towers were situated in the centre of the curtain walls, but the majority of them have disappeared. This curtain walls were crowned with a covered path. A door with a portcullis, framed by two towers, gives access to the high courtyard containing the lordly residence, the ceremonial room, outhouses including the large-chimneyed kitchen, as well as many storage areas: a water cistern, a corn silo, and cellars located under the home with access staircases. A covered gallery existed along the buildings besides the high courtyard.

From the 15th century, these buildings were modified to make them more comfortable. The windows were opened, the walls were coated with murals, and an approach ramp to the postern in the lordly residence was constructed.

Subsequently, the castle fell into neglect. Rooms were abandoned and windows were walled, and the castle was completely abandoned in the 18th century, just before the French Revolution.

== History ==
At a key point between the Auvergne, Forez, and Bourbonnais, Montgilbert was probably built by the family of Saint-Gérand around 1250, during the reign of Saint Louis.

Around 1280, the Aycelin family bought the castle. They were rich bourgeoisie, later ennobled, of the Auvergne.

The castle was passed by marriage to the De Vienne family. However, Rodrigue de Villandrando, a Spanish mercenary in the pay of King Charles VII of France, confiscated the castle from 1434 to 1439, during the Hundred Years' War. Important modifications to the castle (including the bastion and external walls) were carried out during this period.

During the Renaissance, Montgilbert became less and less a place of residence for its owners, the family of Saulx-Tavannes. The French Wars of Religion were covering the country with blood, and the Bourbonnais was definitively attached to France.

Under Louis XIV, the owners lived among the noble court. Certain parts of the castle were given up, starting its ruin.

Around 1770, the last heir, Jean Baptiste Bravard d'Eyssat Duprat, returned to Montgilbert with his mother. To coax him to leave this obsolete castle, she probably unpinned the roof.

In 1793, the castle was sold as a national asset.

During the nineteenth century, inhabitants of the neighbourhood used the castle as a stone quarry, accelerating its ruin.

== Current situation ==
The castle of Montgilbert was registered on the Inventaire Supplémentaire des Monuments Historiques on October 11, 1930. It is described in the French Ministry of Culture database as "perhaps the doyen of feudal fortresses in the region" ("peut-être la doyenne des forteresses féodales de la région").

An association to save the site was created in 1974 after some initial work began in 1973. This association is active around the year (as of the beginning of 2010) and organizes construction jobs each year for youth volunteers. This association is affiliated with the Union Rempart, a federation of associations to safeguard the cultural heritage of France.

== See also ==
- List of castles in France
