= Freyssinet Test Arch =

1909 concrete arch

- Arche d'essai Freyssinet
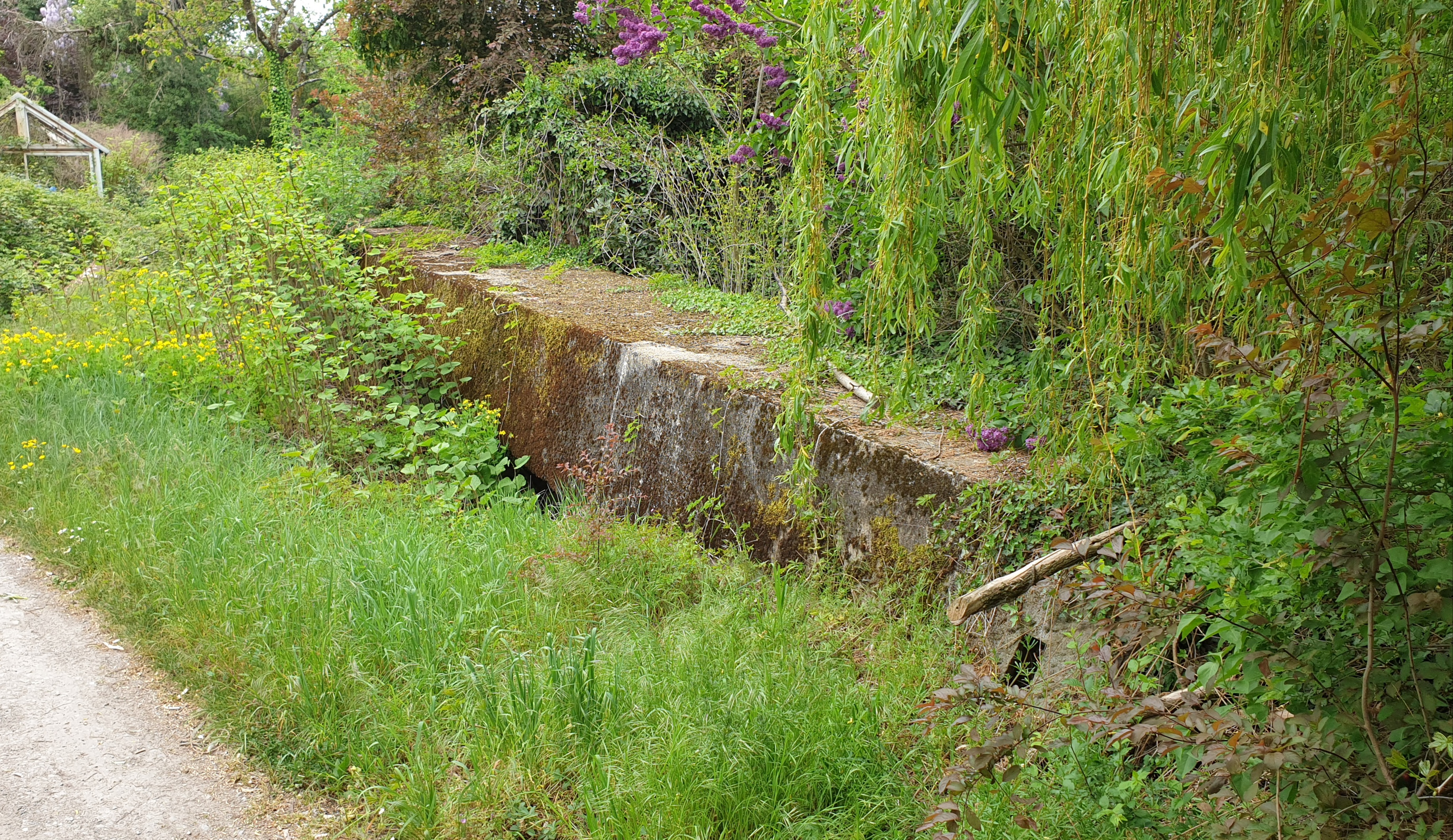
- The arch is largely buried and enclosed in vegetation
- Location: Moulins, Allier France
- Coordinates: 46°33′21″N 3°20′06″E
- Designer: Eugène Freyssinet
- Type: Arch
- Material: Prestressed concrete
- Length: 50 metres (160 ft)
- Width: 2.5 metres (8 ft 2 in) (max)
- Height: 2 metres (6 ft 7 in)
- Beginning date: 1909
- Completion date: 1909
- Dedicated to: Strength test

The Freyssinet Test Arch (in French Arche d'essai Freyssinet) is a prestressed concrete arch built in 1909 in Moulins, Allier by Eugène Freyssinet. Its purpose was to test the resistance of this material to traction exerted on very flat and long-range arches. Freyssinet wanted to validate this prestressed concrete technique which he had perfected before the construction of three road bridges over the Allier river which he was to undertake in the following years: the Veurdre Bridge, the Boutiron Bridge and the Châtel-de-Neuvre bridge. As the first testimony to this innovative technique, the arch has been registered as a Monument historique since October 2021 with Boutiron Bridge, the only existing original bridge of the three.
