= Arboretum Paul Barge =

Arboretum and natural area in Auvergne, France

Coordinates: 46.0321°N 3.6516°E

The Arboretum Paul Barge (6 hectares) is a municipal arboretum and natural area located in Ferrières-sur-Sichon, Allier, Auvergne, France. It is open daily without charge.

The arboretum includes forested areas with three trails, a herbarium, and timber exhibits. The town has planted various tree species, including all known trees native to the Bourbonnaise mountains, as well as exotic species including Ginkgo biloba and Liriodendron tulipifera.

== See also ==
- List of botanical gardens in France
