= Savines Bridge =

Savines Bridge Pont de Savines
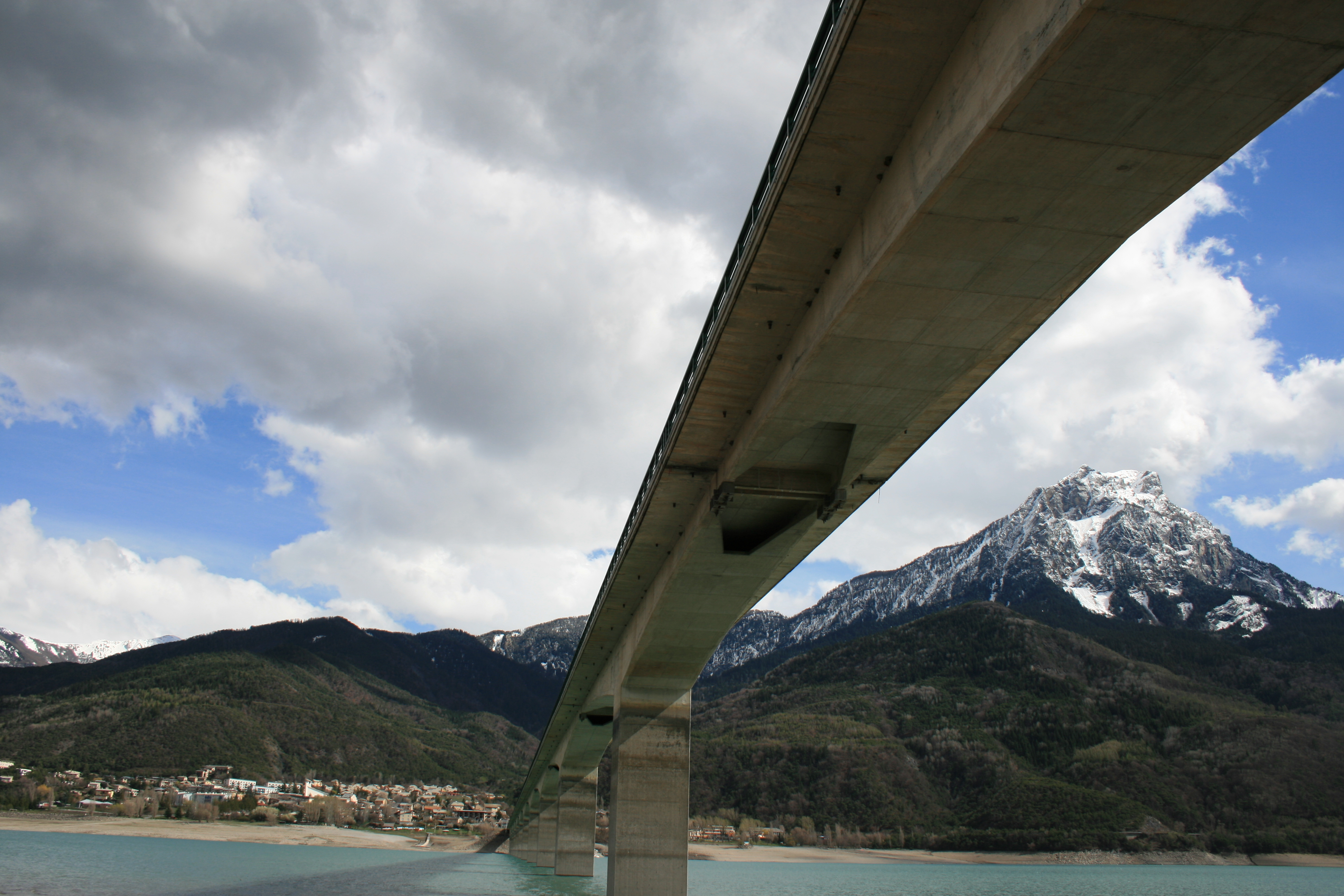
- View in April 2008
- Coordinates: 44.531°N 6.395°E
- Carries: Vehicles on the Route nationale N94
- Crosses: Lac de Serre-Ponçon
- Locale: Provence-Alpes-Côte d'Azur, south-west France

Characteristics
- Design: Haunched box girder bridge
- Material: Reinforced concrete
- Total length: 924 m (3,031 ft)
- Width: 30 ft (9.1 m)
- Height: 50 m (160 ft)
- Longest span: 77 m (253 ft)
- No. of spans: 11
- Piers in water: 12

History
- Designer: Jean Courbon
- Constructed by: Société des Grands Travaux de Marseille
- Construction start: 1958
- Opened: 1960
- Inaugurated: 15 May 1960

Location
- Interactive map of Savines Bridge

The Savines Bridge (Pont de Savines) is a 924m concrete viaduct (box girder bridge) in Savines-le-Lac, in the Provence Alps and Prealps of south-east France, built in 1960. It crosses Lac de Serre-Ponçon, a reservoir of the Durance river.

== History ==
=== Design ===
The bridge was designed by Jean Courbon, a famous bridge engineer with the Société d'Études et d'Équipements d'Entreprise, or SEEE of Rue Salvador Allende in Nanterre. It was one of the first post-tensioned prestressed concrete (béton précontraint) bridges built in France.

The concrete piers are 16 foot 5 inches square with 16 inch thick concrete walls.

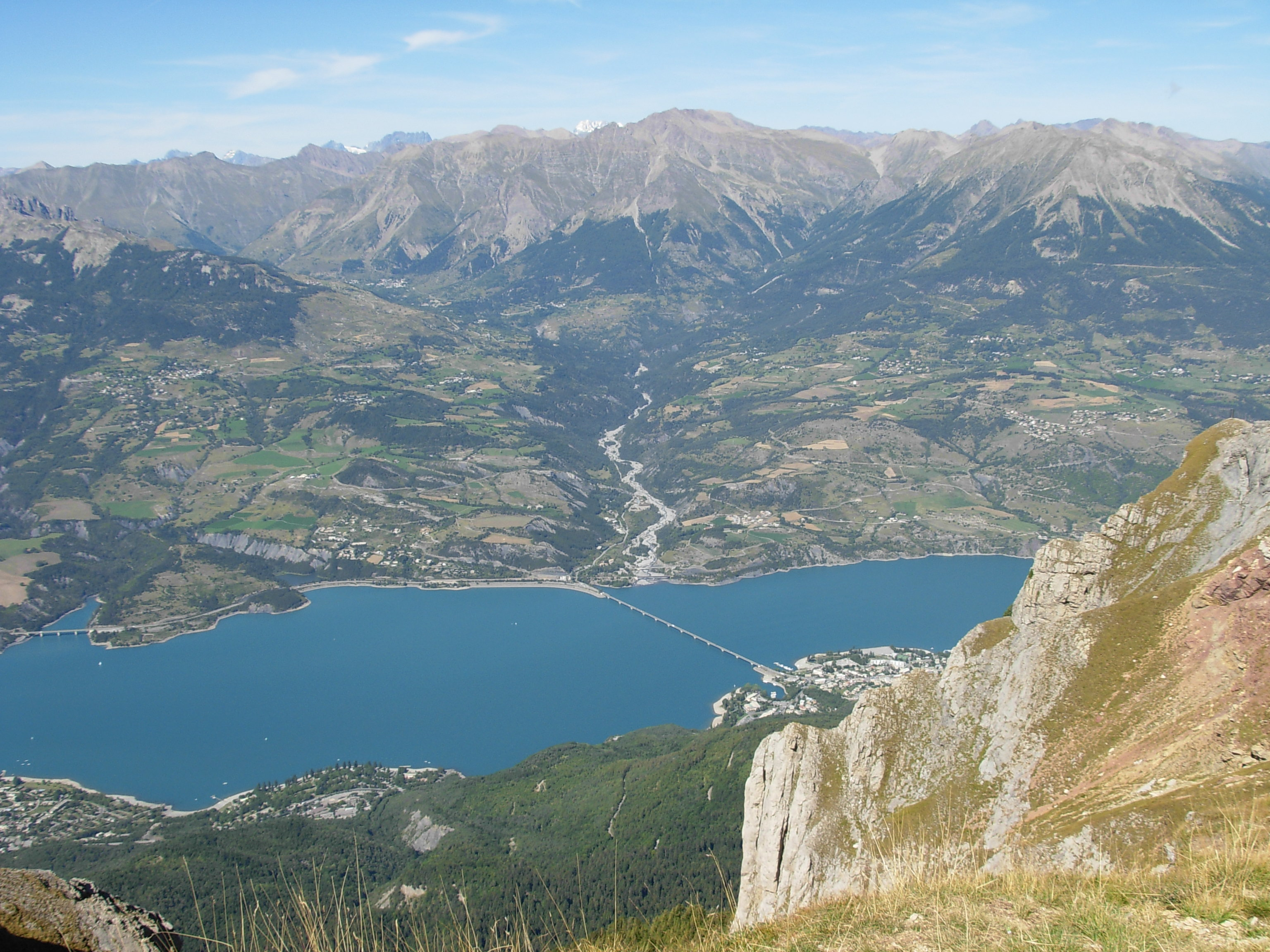
View in September 2008

=== Construction ===
It was built by Entreprise GTM, with construction starting in 1958. It was built with the balanced cantilever, or free cantilever, method, and mobile cantilever scaffolding. The reservoir (retenue du barrage) began construction in 1955 and was finished in June 1960.

The bridge was built before the valley had been flooded, and the concrete piers are much higher than they may look.

== Structure ==
It is situated in the Hautes-Alpes department in the Provence-Alpes-Côte d'Azur region in the far east of southern France. It crosses the Lac de Serre-Ponçon, an artificial lake or reservoir. The creation of the lake prompted the 1958 film, Girl and the River. It carries the N94 (Route Nationale RN 94) road.

== See also ==
- International Federation for Structural Concrete (Fédération Internationale du Béton)
