= Jules Verne Viaduct =

Bridge in France

Coordinates: 49.884008°N 2.371783°E

The Jules Verne Viaduct is a viaduct constructed in 1987 that crosses the River Somme near Camon, east of Amiens. It is 943 metres (3,094 ft) long and allows circumvention of the city by roads. It has a deck depth of 3.2 metres (10 ft) and a deck width of 11.45 metres (37.6 ft). It is located at 49° 53' 2.28" N, 2° 22' 18.42" E. It was designed by Charles Lavigne.
