= Saint-Rémy-de-Maurienne =

Saint-Rémy-de-Maurienne Sin Rmi (Savoyard)
- Commune
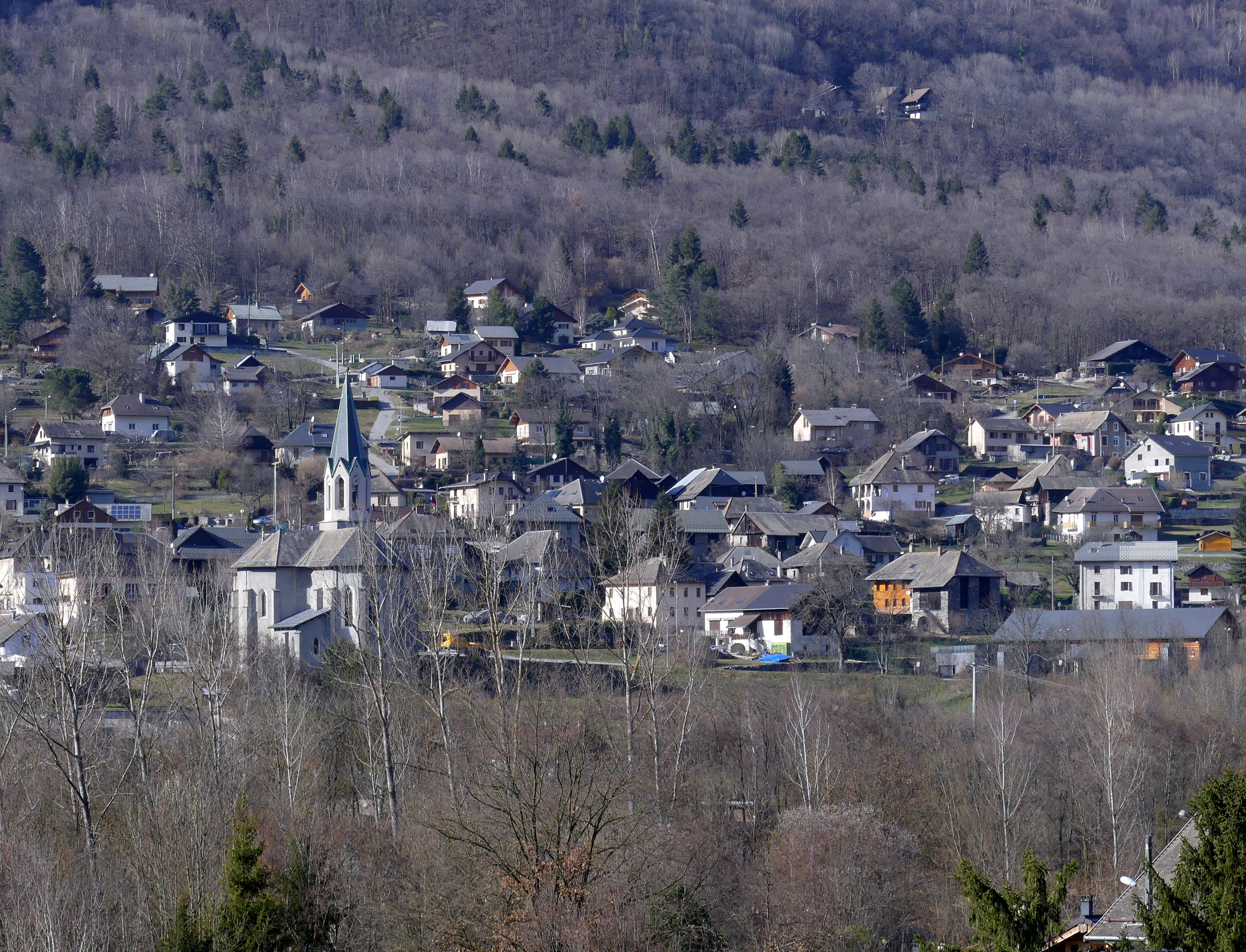

- Coat of arms
- Location of Saint-Rémy-de-Maurienne
- Location within France Location within Auvergne-Rhône-Alpes
- Coordinates: 45°23′34″N 6°15′56″E
- Country: France
- Region: Auvergne-Rhône-Alpes
- Department: Savoie
- Arrondissement: Saint-Jean-de-Maurienne
- Canton: Saint-Jean-de-Maurienne

Government
  - Mayor (2020–2026): Bertrand Mondet
- Area^{1}: 44.26 km^{2} (17.09 sq mi)
- Highest elevation: 2,760 m (9,060 ft)
- Lowest elevation: 394 m (1,293 ft)
- Population (2023): 1,289
  - Density: 29.12/km^{2} (75.43/sq mi)
- Time zone: UTC+01:00 (CET)
  - Summer (DST): UTC+02:00 (CEST)
- INSEE/Postal code: 73278 /73660
- ^{1} French Land Register data, which excludes lakes, ponds, glaciers > 1 km^{2} (0.386 sq mi or 247 acres) and river estuaries.

Saint-Rémy-de-Maurienne (Savoyard: Sin Rmi, before 1962: Saint-Rémy) is a commune in the Savoie department in the Auvergne-Rhône-Alpes region in south-eastern France.

== See also ==
- Communes of the Savoie department
