= Ferrières-sur-Sichon =

- Commune
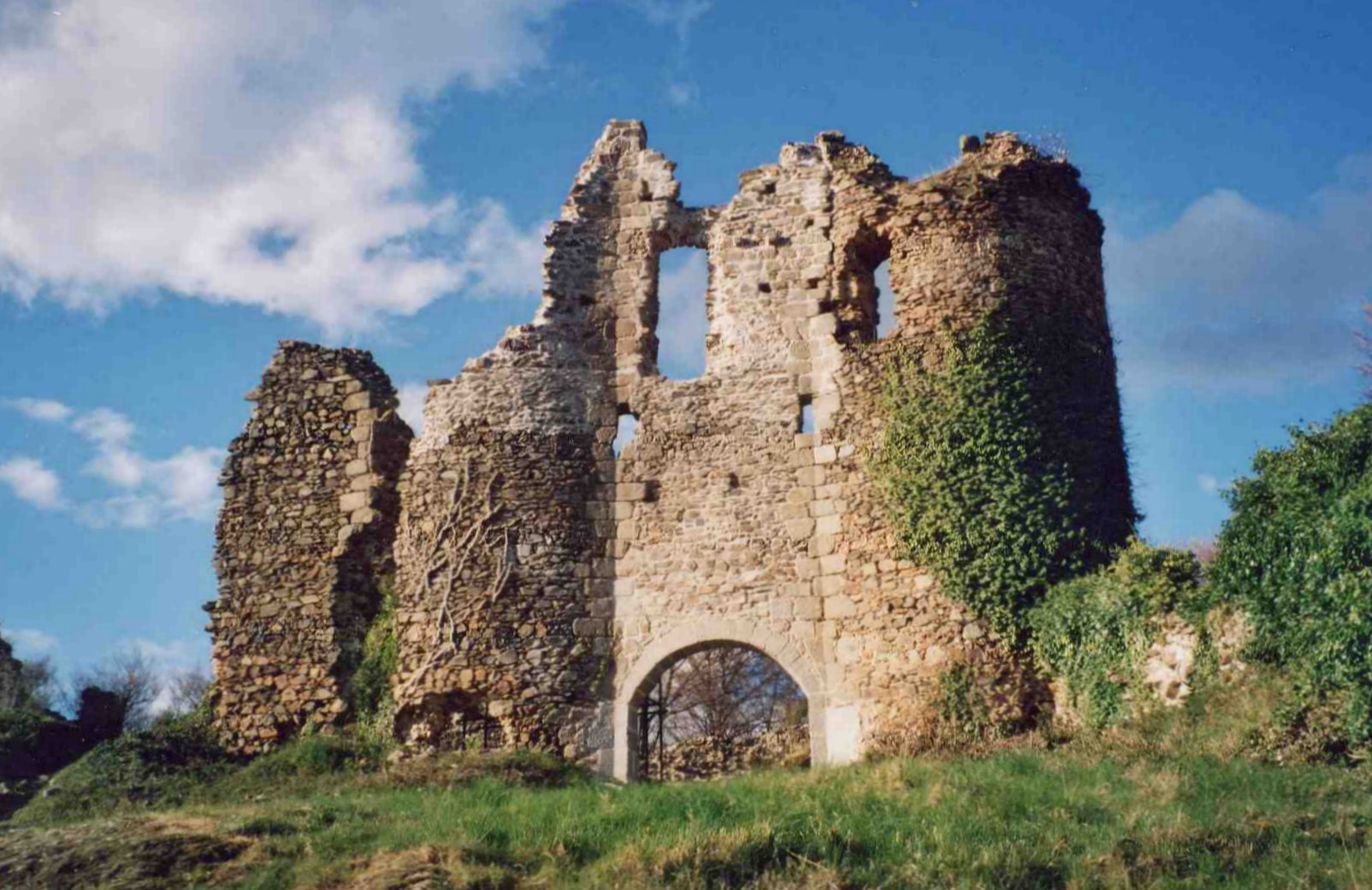
- Chateau of Montgilbert

- Coat of arms
- Location of Ferrières-sur-Sichon
- Location within France Location within Auvergne-Rhône-Alpes
- Coordinates: 46°01′34″N 3°38′59″E
- Country: France
- Region: Auvergne-Rhône-Alpes
- Department: Allier
- Arrondissement: Vichy
- Canton: Lapalisse
- Intercommunality: CA Vichy Communauté

Government
  - Mayor (2026–32): Bénédicte Guillon Gravillon
- Area^{1}: 38.58 km^{2} (14.90 sq mi)
- Elevation: 554 m (1,818 ft)
- Highest elevation: 980 m (3,220 ft)
- Lowest elevation: 397 m (1,302 ft)
- Population (2023): 496
  - Density: 12.9/km^{2} (33.3/sq mi)
- Time zone: UTC+01:00 (CET)
  - Summer (DST): UTC+02:00 (CEST)
- INSEE/Postal code: 03113 /03250
- ^{1} French Land Register data, which excludes lakes, ponds, glaciers > 1 km^{2} (0.386 sq mi or 247 acres) and river estuaries.

Ferrières-sur-Sichon (French pronunciation: [fɛʁjɛʁ syʁ siʃɔ̃]; Occitan: Ferrièras) is a commune in the Allier department in central France.

== Population ==
Historical population
Year	Pop.	±% p.a.
1968	916	—
1975	795	−2.00%
1982	656	−2.71%
1990	632	−0.46%
1999	561	−1.32%
2007	561	+0.00%
2012	569	+0.28%
2017	552	−0.60%
2023	496	−1.77%
Source: INSEE

== Sights ==
- Arboretum Paul Barge

== See also ==
- Glozel
- Communes of the Allier department
