= Châtel-de-Neuvre =

- Commune
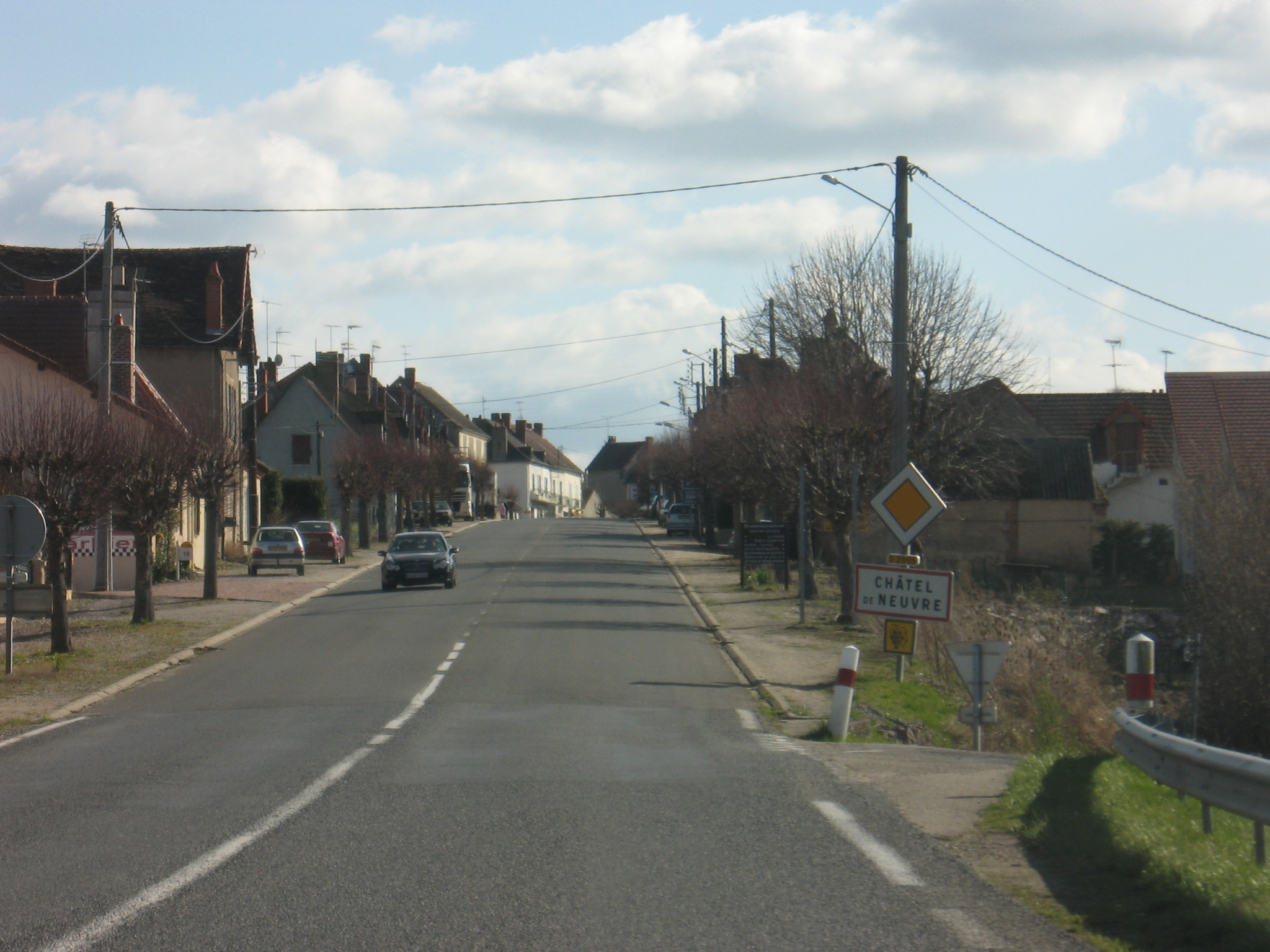
- The road into Châtel-de-Neuvre
- Location of Châtel-de-Neuvre
- Location within France Location within Auvergne-Rhône-Alpes
- Coordinates: 46°24′26″N 3°18′46″E
- Country: France
- Region: Auvergne-Rhône-Alpes
- Department: Allier
- Arrondissement: Moulins
- Canton: Souvigny
- Intercommunality: Bocage Bourbonnais

Government
  - Mayor (2026–32): Philippe Faulconnier
- Area^{1}: 19.34 km^{2} (7.47 sq mi)
- Elevation: 237 m (778 ft)
- Highest elevation: 301 m (988 ft)
- Lowest elevation: 214 m (702 ft)
- Population (2023): 563
  - Density: 29.1/km^{2} (75.4/sq mi)
- Time zone: UTC+01:00 (CET)
  - Summer (DST): UTC+02:00 (CEST)
- INSEE/Postal code: 03065 /03500
- ^{1} French Land Register data, which excludes lakes, ponds, glaciers > 1 km^{2} (0.386 sq mi or 247 acres) and river estuaries.

Châtel-de-Neuvre (French pronunciation: [ʃatɛl də nœvʁ]) is a commune in the Allier department in central France.

== Population ==
Historical population
Year	Pop.	±% p.a.
1968	600	—
1975	529	−1.78%
1982	582	+1.37%
1990	512	−1.59%
1999	515	+0.06%
2007	517	+0.05%
2012	553	+1.36%
2017	542	−0.40%
2023	563	+0.64%
Source: INSEE

== See also ==
- Communes of the Allier department
