= Tramway from Verneuil-l'Étang to Melun =

French railway

Verneuil-l'Étang – Melun Tramway
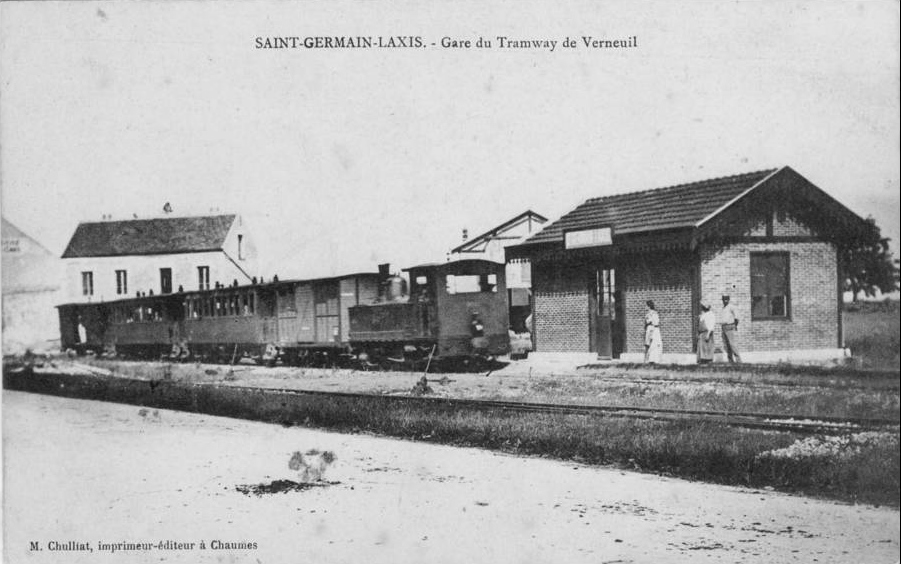
- Tramway of Verneuil in station of Saint-Germain-Laxis

Overview
- Owner: Ch. de fer économiques (1901–1950)
- Locale: France

Service
- Services: Verneuil-l'Étang, Guignes, Yèbles, Crisenoy, Champdeuil, Saint-Germain-Laxis, Rubelles, Voisenon, Maincy and Melun

History
- Opened: 1901
- Closed: 1950

Technical
- Line length: 18.37 km (11.41 mi)
- Track gauge: Metre-gauge railway
- Electrification: Not electrified

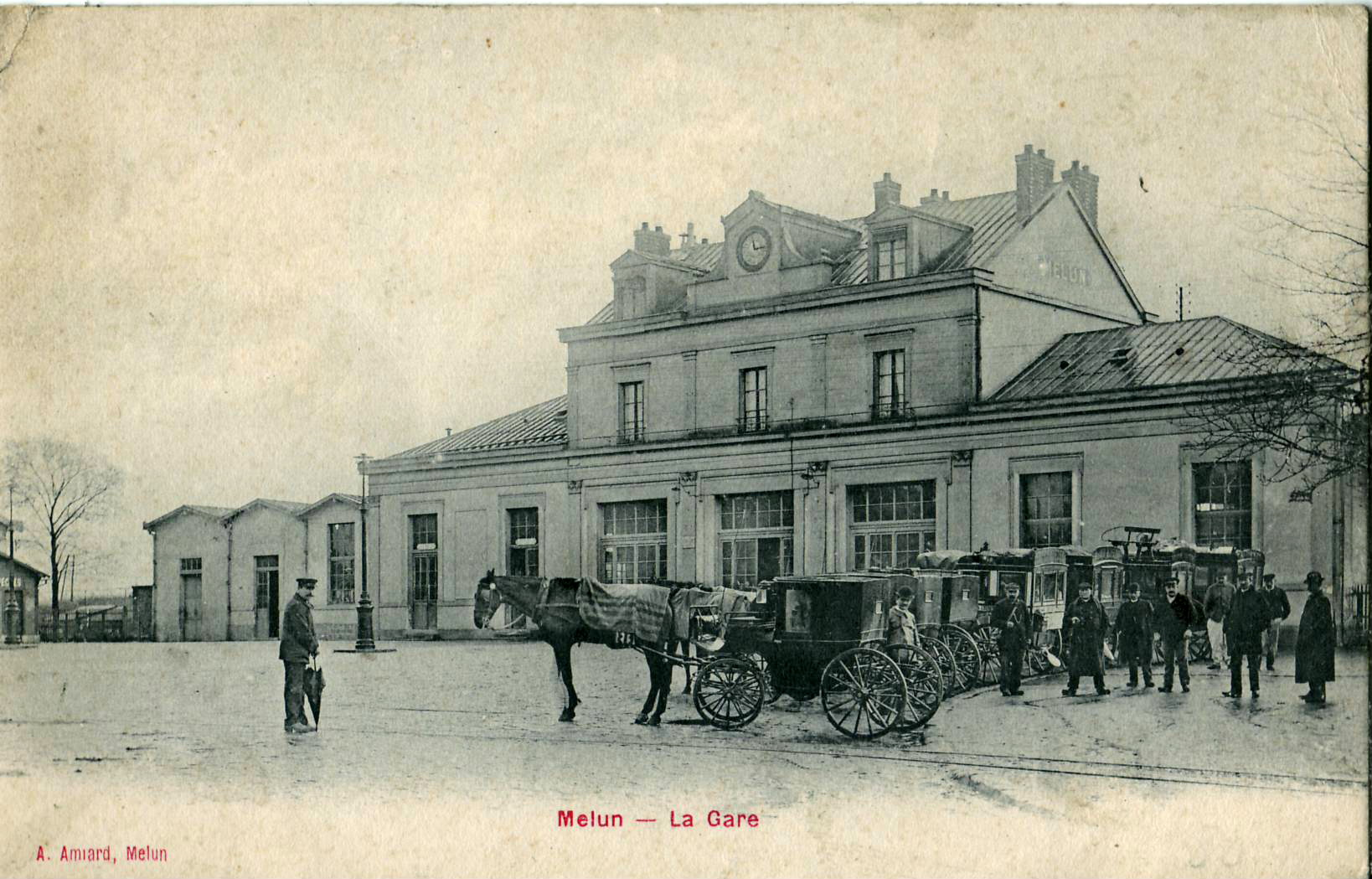
Melun PLM train station.

The tramway from Verneuil-l'Étang to Melun, also known as the Verneuil tacot or Verneuil tramway, was one of the secondary railway lines in Seine-et-Marne, operated from 1901 to 1950 by the Société générale des chemins de fer économiques (SE), of which it was the first line in the department. It connected Melun to Verneuil-l'Étang. The line was 18.390 km long and took one hour to cover on a one-meter gauge track. Passenger numbers increased until 1914, but the war subsequently disrupted its traffic. Between the two World Wars, buses competed with it for passenger traffic. The line’s profitability then declined, and it was eventually used only by the sugar industry before its closure and dismantling.

== History ==
=== Plans for the line ===
==== Early projects ====
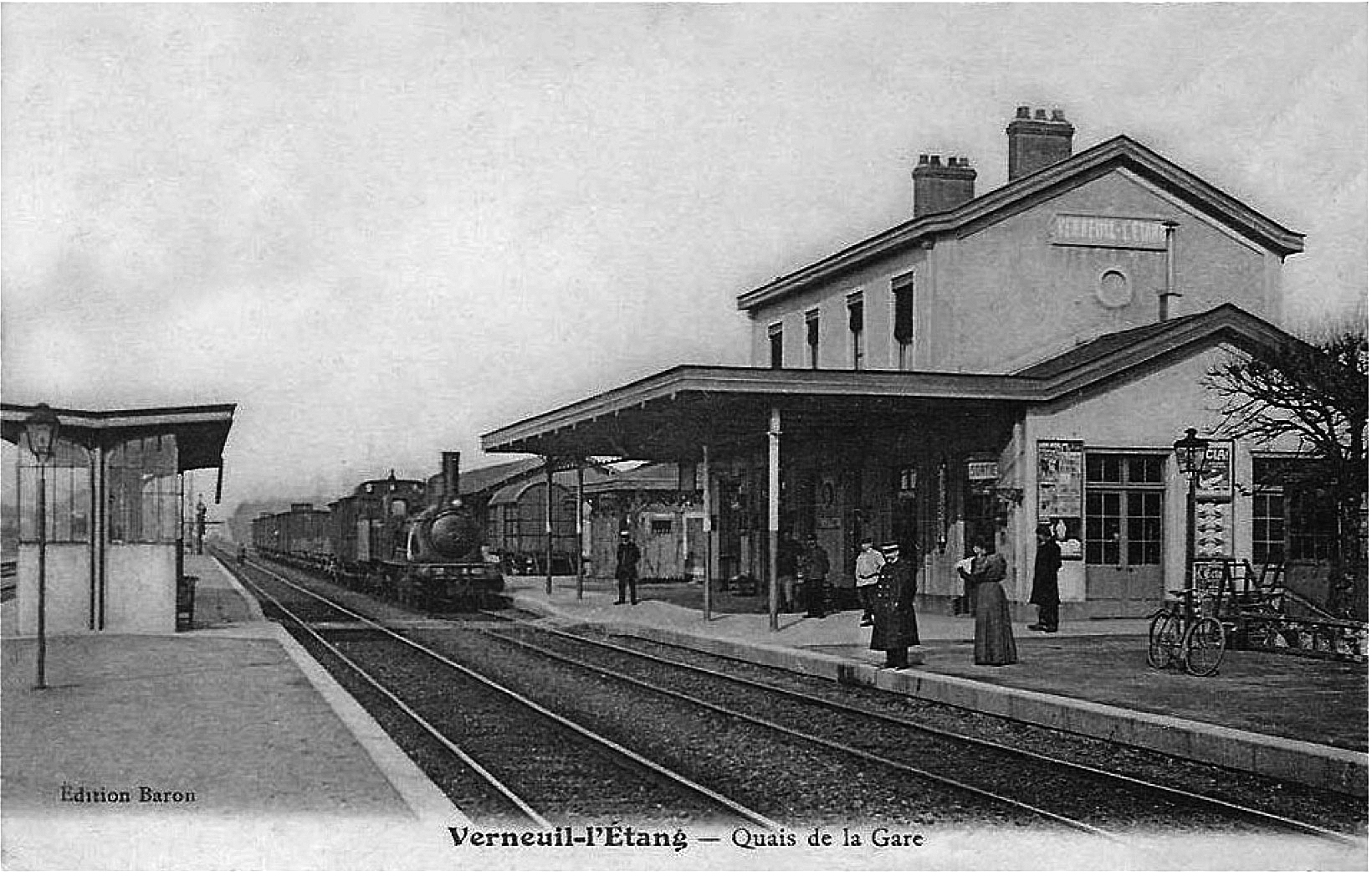
Verneuil-l'Étang station, near which the former tram terminus was located.

During the second half of the 19th century, the railway network expanded in Seine-et-Marne. The towns of Verneuil-l'Étang and Melun both had mainline stations, the former on the Paris-Est to Mulhouse-Ville line, and the latter on the Paris-Lyon to Marseille-Saint-Charles line. During this period, the department began considering ways to connect the two towns by rail. With the publication of the 1880 law on secondary railways, the department of Seine-et-Marne placed particular importance on areas of its territory not served by rail. However, the chief engineer of the departmental Ponts et Chaussées curbed the department's ambitions, doubting that the future tramways of Seine-et-Marne could be as successful as “in other departments that are both agricultural and industrial.” He therefore proposed the construction of one or two lines that would serve as a test, after which the costs and profitability could be assessed before considering the construction of additional lines.

On August 25, 1882, an initial project was presented by the Compagnie de l’Est, proposing a line from Melun to Coulommiers via Marles-en-Brie. The conseil général rejected the project in its current form and requested the opening of a public inquiry into various proposed routes for this connection, which was considered highly important for military reasons.

On March 25, 1885, the conseil général of Seine-et-Marne approved the connections from Coulommiers to La Ferté-sous-Jouarre, from Brie-Comte-Robert to Verneuil, and from Verneuil to Marles-en-Brie and Rozay-en-Brie, while postponing the project for a line from Melun to Verneuil.

It was not until 1892 that the chief engineer, M. Koziorowicz, proposed the creation of steam tramway lines built on road shoulders, with rails laid along the edge of the roadway rather than on a separate platform. This significantly reduced construction costs, as the department would build its network itself and then lease it to an “operating contractor.” The topography of the Seine-et-Marne department, along with the layout of already existing lines, led the conseil général to plan several transverse lines running from south to north, the first of which would be a line from Melun to Guignes.

==== Origin of the line ====
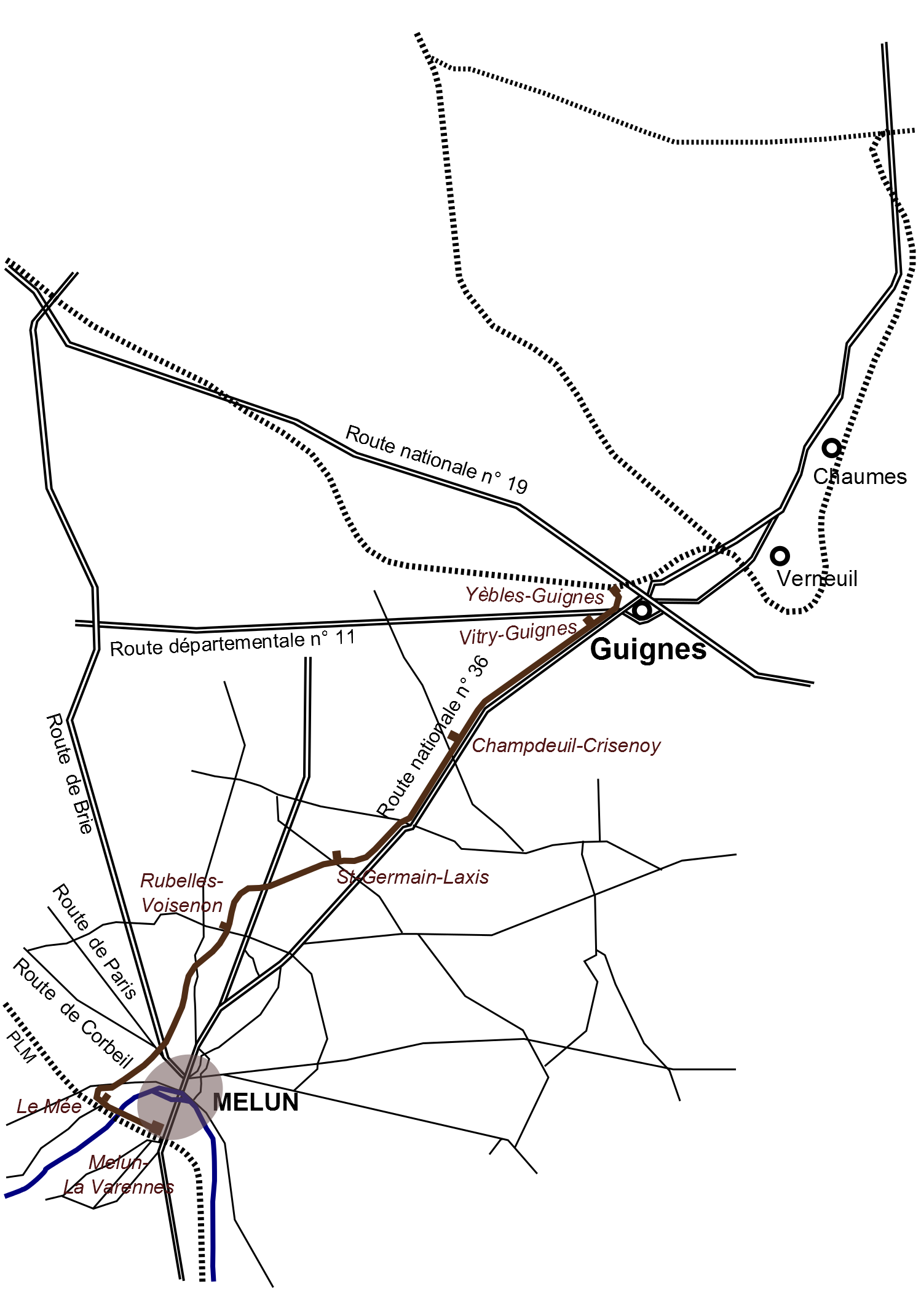
Route of the line from Melun to Guignes in the 1892 project.

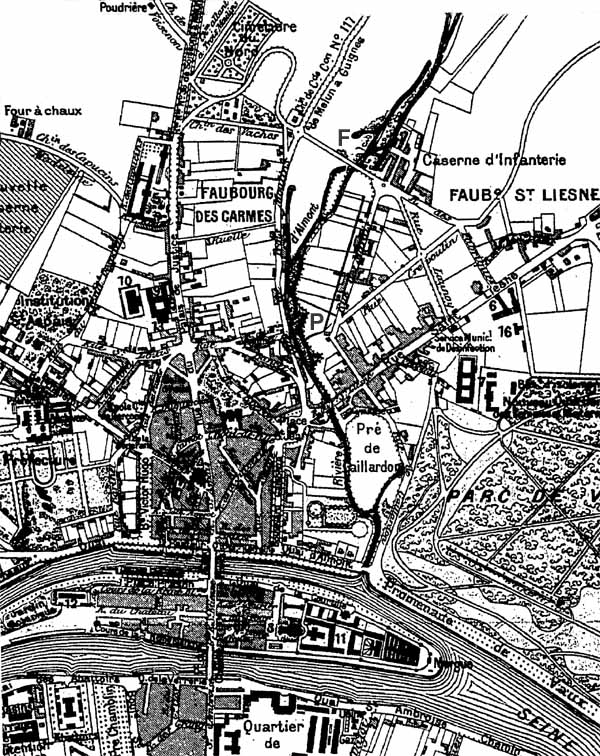
Northeastern part of Melun, excerpt from a map published in a tourist guide in 1896. View of the Gaillardon meadow and part of what would become the tramway route in Melun.

A circular was issued on April 8, 1892, concerning a proposed narrow-gauge railway presented by Henri Décante, starting from a station named “Melun-La Varenne,” located on Rue de Dammarie in Melun.

According to the project, the line would then pass over the railway bridge of the PLM line, widened for the occasion, to stop at the “Mée-sur-Seine” station. After that, the tramway line would separate from the main line and follow a sharp curve to run alongside chemin no 39. It would cross this path at the junction of a road leading to the Mée town hall, where a halt would be located. It would then continue almost in a straight line toward the junction of the Paris and Brie roads, crossing underneath. At this location, there would be the “Melun-Saint-Barthélémy” station. After this stop, the line would follow a fold in the terrain to bypass the Montaigu hill, then pass under chemin no 35, near the gates of the Voisenon park. It would then cross the small valley closed off by the Saint-Nicolas meadows stream, passing over the road from Voisenon to Maincy. The “Rubelles-Voisenon” station would be located at the level crossing of chemin no 82, equidistant from the two towns. The line would then continue along the border of the two territories. It would then curve right to reach road no 21, where there would be a halt at Montereau-sur-le-Jard, at the location known as “Luteau.” It would then follow the road from Rubelles to Saint-Germain, to reach the town and “Saint-Germain-Laxis” station, at the intersection with chemin no 126. The line would take the Meaux road to reach the “Les Bordes” halt at the intersection with chemin no 57, then “Champdeuil-Crisenoy” station at the intersection with chemin no 130, followed by the optional halts of “Genouilly,” “Suscy,” and “Vulaines.” The tacot would then reach the “Vitry-Guignes” station at the junction of national road 36, departmental road 11, and chemin no 99. The line would end at “Yèbles-Guignes station,” via a curve, connecting with the Vincennes line.

The Vitry-Guignes station had the advantage of being very close to the Guignes sugar factory. The track would be between 0.6 and 1 meter wide. However, this project would require not only widening the Mée bridge, which would be very costly, but also obtaining permission from the PLM company to use its tracks. Furthermore, another issue arose: the challenge of making the tramway tracks coexist with those of the mainline railways, which had a rail gauge of 1.435 meters. This project underwent numerous changes but remained unrealized for five years.

Nevertheless, the need for such a line kept growing due to the increasing production of sugar factories, distilleries, and beet slicing facilities in the region, which required more efficient transportation.

==== Melun to Guignes line ====
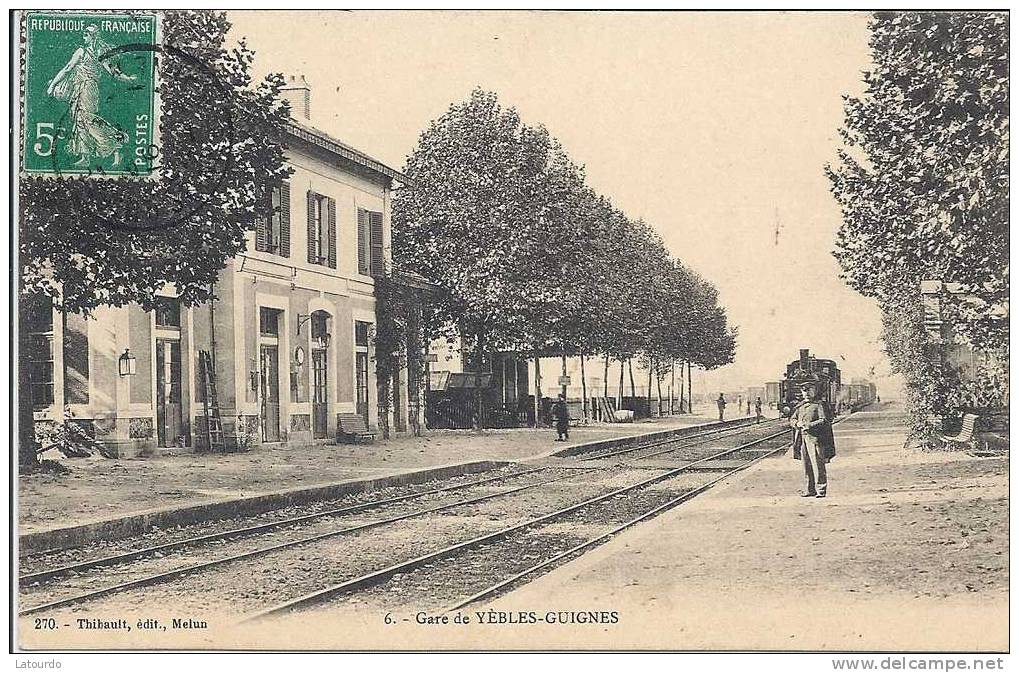
The Yèbles-Guignes station at the beginning of the 20th century on the Vincennes line.

A new project was developed by the department in 1893, placing the Melun terminus station on Rue des Marais. Two locations were considered: one near the Almont, on the banks of the Seine, and the other near the college, not far from the courthouse. The local engineer of Melun highlighted that the second location would be unfavorable for effective service because it would be too far from the city center and would also be difficult to access for freight; moreover, it would make a possible future extension of the tramway to Melun station impossible. Therefore, the first location was preferred, as it had the advantage of being near Place Saint-Jean, in the center of Melun. Additionally, this location would allow the construction of a branch line to the Seine bank to set up a water point to supply locomotives with water.

The planned route would start from chemin no 35, then follow chemin no 117, take national road 36, and, via a diversion, serve Guignes and connect to the Vincennes line, whose section between Verneuil and Marles-en-Brie had just opened on June 4, 1893. The project had the advantage of featuring minimal gradients, little earthwork, and few engineering structures to build, thus making it inexpensive to construct. In addition to the terminal stations, stations were planned at Saint-Germain-Laxis, Champdeuil, Crisenoy, and a second one in Guignes to serve the sugar factory. These stations would be complemented by a “Rubelles-Voisenon” halt and optional stops at the hamlets of Trois-Moulins, Bordes, Genouilly, and Suscy.

The line was planned to be 16.114 kilometers long: 15.114 kilometers from Melun station to Guignes station, plus 1,000 meters for an extension to the Seine. The project’s expenses were set at 624,000 francs, or 38,700 francs per kilometer.

Another route was also considered, starting from the entrance to Guignes, passing along chemin no 99 to connect to Verneuil station. This alternative had the advantage of allowing travel to Coulommiers without changing trains at Guignes. However, it required widening this road, which was too narrow, and extending the line by six kilometers. The cost of this extension would range from 73,000 to 82,000 francs, depending on the chosen route. Ultimately, the project abandoned the idea of a connection to Verneuil and focused on Guignes.

=== Creation of the line ===
==== Project approval ====
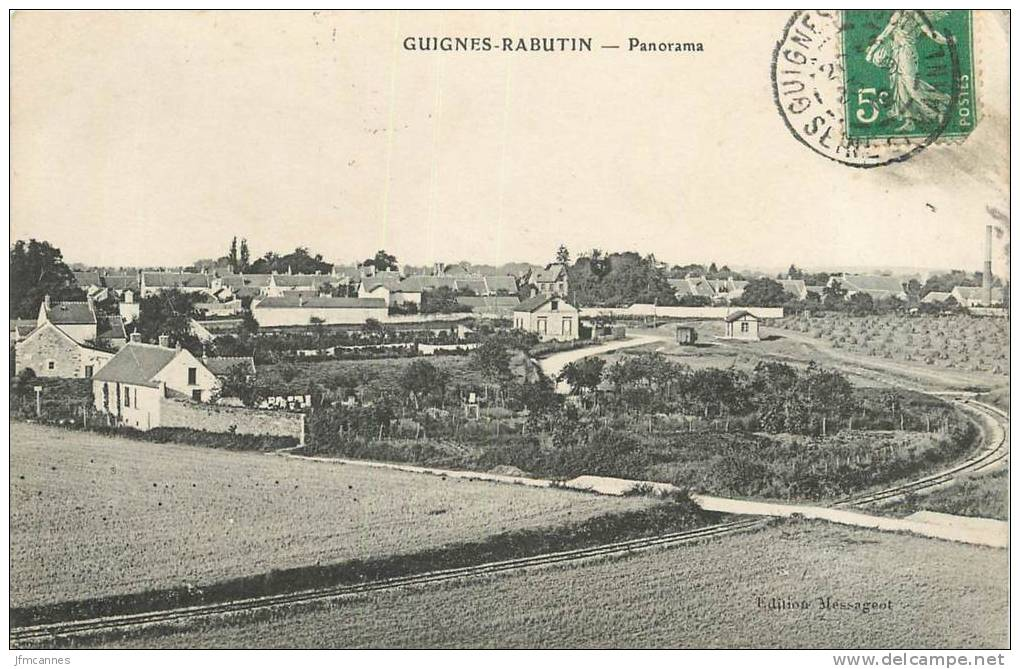
Panorama of Guignes with the tramway tracks and Guignes-Ville station at the beginning of the 20th century.

In 1897, the connection from Melun to Villiers-Saint-Georges via Verneuil and Jouy-le-Châtel was one of the six most requested. However, the department could not financially support the many projects under consideration. The conseil général decided that same year, after much hesitation, to proceed with the creation of two lines: one from Sablonnières to Bray-sur-Seine, and the other from Verneuil to Melun, to serve as many towns as possible.

After abandoning many proposed routes, the conseil général gave a favorable opinion for the creation of a line from Melun to Verneuil. A retrocession agreement was signed between the prefect of Seine-et-Marne and the director of SE on April 28, 1899. The formalities for the declaration of public utility were immediately undertaken, and the file was forwarded to the higher authorities. The line was declared of public utility by a decree on May 6, 1899.

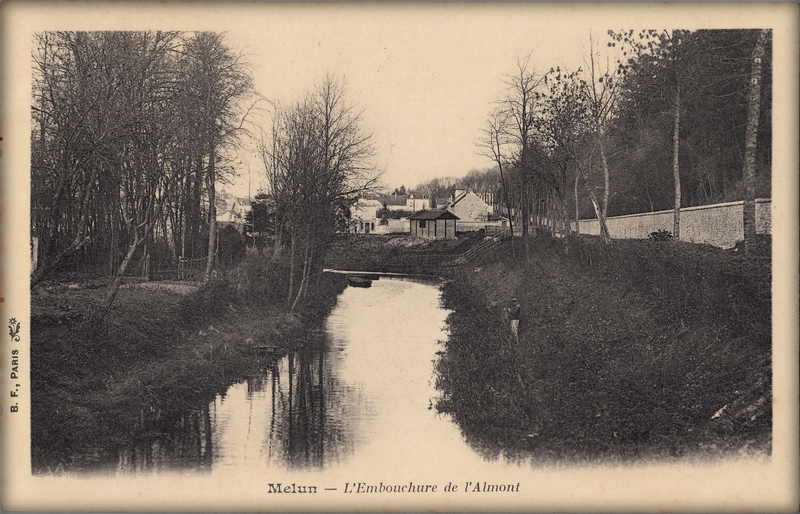
Mouth of the Almont with the Melun-Ville train station building in the background.

In 1900, during its first session, the conseil général decided to create a departmental network of 133 kilometers, to be built by the department, which would then seek a concessionaire to operate it and provide the rolling stock, tools, depots, workshops, and station furniture. Within this network, the Verneuil to Melun line was isolated from the “Étoile de Jouy-le-Châtel,” where all the other lines intersected. The project involved a line running from the river port of Melun to Verneuil, passing through the Guignes sugar factory. The route chosen was similar to the December 1893 project, with the Verneuil variant and an additional stop planned at Melun-Octroi.

Three candidates were interested in the project: the Departmental Railway Company, the Société générale des chemins de fer économiques, and Messrs. Coignet and Grosselin, public works contractors and concessionaires of other local railways. After reviewing the three offers, that of the Société générale des chemins de fer économiques, which had good references, was chosen. Despite its good results, the Departmental Railway Company was not selected, even though it offered the same conditions and already operated other lines in Seine-et-Marne, as the conseil général wanted to diversify its operators.

The terminal station of the tramway, known as Melun-Ville and located near the Seine, on Rue Mail-Gaillardon, was not planned to connect with the PLM station located at the other end of the city. It was considered too difficult to cross the entire city using road bridges or to build a bridge near the prison to cross the Seine. Such a route would have been too costly for a low-cost railway. The connection between the two stations was therefore made via the Melun tramway.

==== Preparation of the line ====
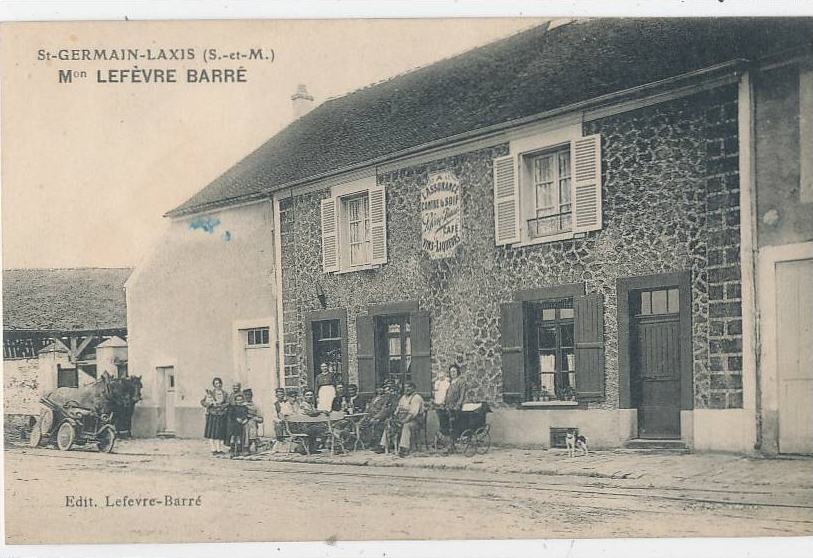
Rue de Meaux opposite the Café de Saint-Germain-Laxis. The tram tracks are in the foreground.

The line was the first in the network to complete the parcel surveys; on 23 February 1900, a ruling was issued for the expropriations necessary for the construction of the tramway. Amicable agreements were made with consenting property owners, and compensation was granted to others. The delivery of ballast was awarded on 30 December 1899. The works on the deviation near Guignes were assigned on 24 February 1900. Subsequently, for the entire network, the department attempted a tendering process in four lots on 13 March 1900: supply of rails and fishplates, supply of screw spikes, fishplate bolts and washers, supply of switches, and supply of sleepers. Only the third lot was awarded to Magnard & Co., from Fourchambault, at a reduced price. Negotiations for the other lots lasted longer.

The establishment expenses for the line, excluding rolling stock, tools, and furnishings, were set at 784,000 francs as of 1 January 1901; the department additionally allocated 250,000 francs for the construction of the line during 1901.

Mr. Heude, chief engineer of the 1st class for bridges and roads, obtained the management of the works, and Mr. Wender, ordinary engineer of the 1st class for the Melun district, was placed in charge of supervising the construction sites. Following a call for tenders, the masonry company Plusquelet Frères was entrusted with the construction of the buildings, while the company Cordier was responsible for earthworks, track laying, and ballasting. The route through the wooded valleys of Rubelles required some expropriations, and a solid crossing had to be built over the ru du Jard at Trois-Moulins.

==== Construction of the line ====
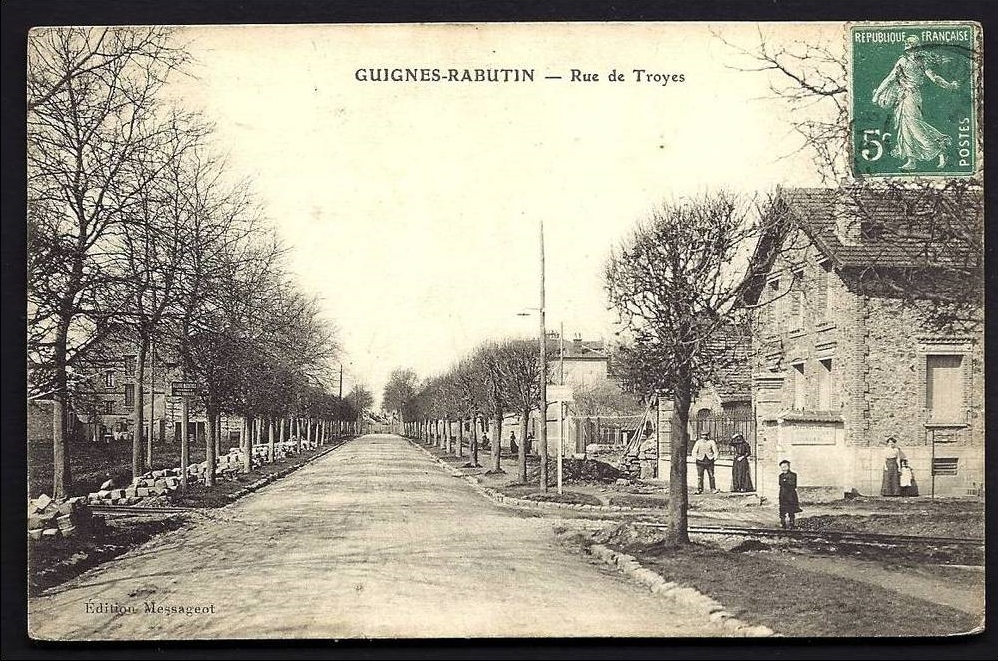
Rue de Troyes in Guignes, under construction, with tram tracks running across it, at the beginning of the 20th century.

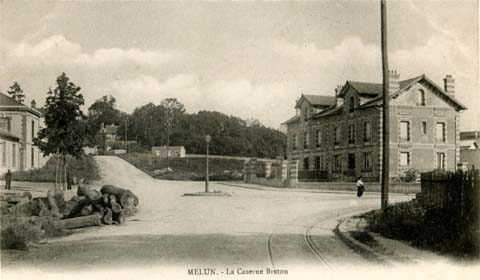
Place and Breton barracks in Melun. You can see the tram tracks coming from Rue des Marais, about to cross the Almont, from where this view was taken, before 1904, just before the Melun-Octroi stop.

Work began in October 1900, and the track was laid by April 1901. At the completion of the works, a convoy formed of a locomotive from the construction site and a carriage provided by the concessionaire was run. This test run took place on 29 April 1901, according to Jean-Claude Riffaud and Jacques Rennaud, thus after the official inauguration on 17 April.

In 1900, the Guignes deviation, 3.173 km long, was built; the supply of ballast cost 95,000 francs, that of sleepers 72,000 francs, that of rails and fishplates 213,400 francs, and that of screw spikes and fishplate bolts 18,400 francs. The delivery of switches, which only occurred in February 1901 at a cost of 24,400 francs, slightly delayed the infrastructure works, ballasting, and track laying, which were completed in April for a total of 142,400 francs.

Construction of the buildings, which began in the previous autumn and was completed shortly after the April 1901 report of the conseil général, cost 67,000 francs; at the same time, the supply of two weighbridges (3,400 francs) and of turntables and cranes (21,400 francs) took place. A connection was built between Verneuil station (tramway) and the Verneuil station of the Compagnie des chemins de fer de l'Est, at the department’s expense. The paving of the stations was also approved by the departmental commission.

=== Line at its peak ===
==== Inauguration ====
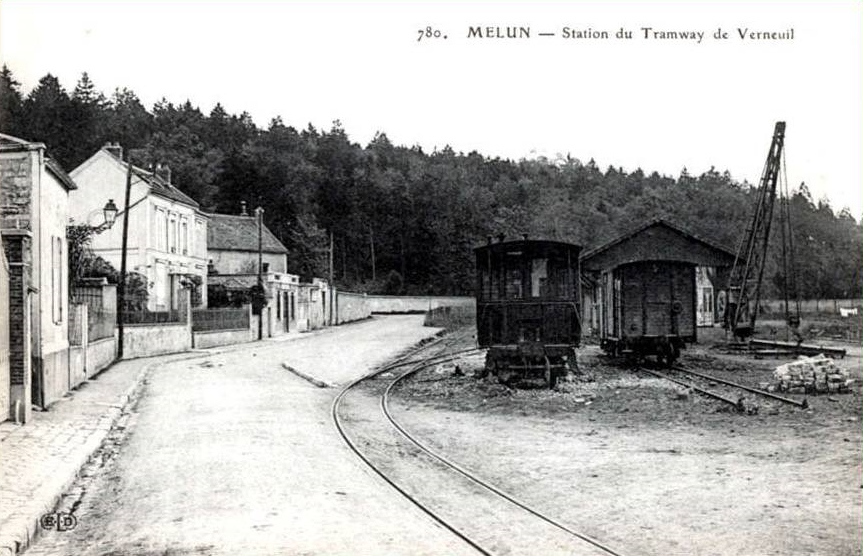
Melun-Ville terminus station before 1914 with its crane, near Almont.

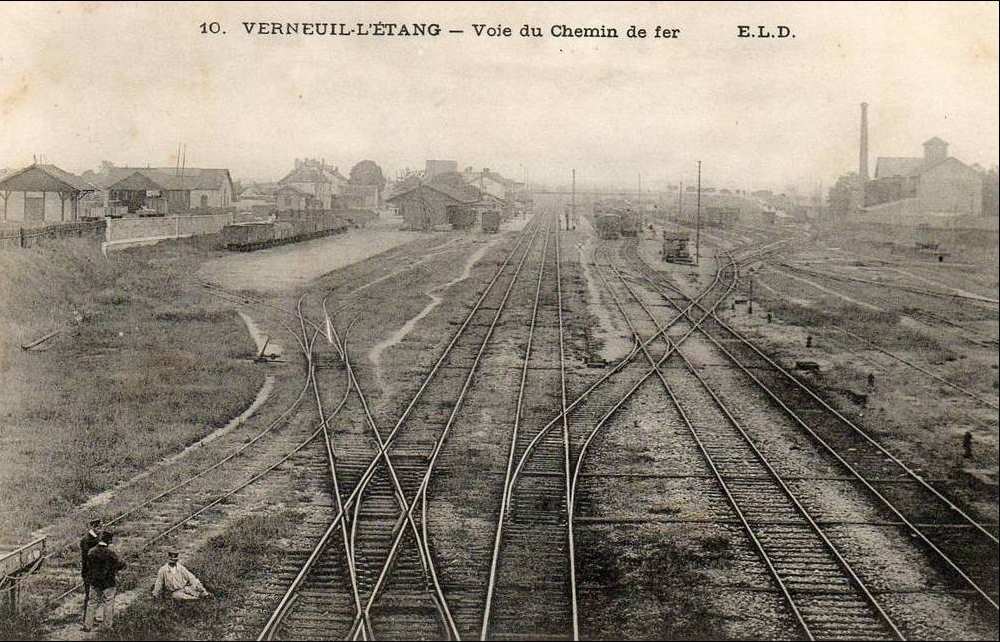
Overview of Verneuil-l'Étang station with the tram station on the left, at the beginning of the 20th century.

In April 1901, the conseil général attended the inauguration. It was the prefect Boegner who presided over the opening ceremony, in the presence of senators, deputies, and all the high officials of the department. The tramway took 1 hour and 5 minutes to complete the journey to Verneuil. Afterwards, a banquet was held in Guignes, attended by the prefect, Mr. Droz, lawyer and, above all, president of the conseil général and conseiller général of Meaux, Count Breffulhe, conseiller général of Mormant, Mr. Balandreau, former mayor of Melun, and Mr. Heude. Finally, upon returning to Melun, the new mayor, Mr. Villeneuve, offered a lunch to his guests and declared in his speech: “Gentlemen, I raise my glass to the progress represented by this steam tramway, to the success of the Melun-Verneuil line which, on this memorable day, inaugurates the series of tramways to be built in Seine-et-Marne and which can only bring prosperity to our beloved department! Long live Seine-et-Marne, long live the Republic, long live France.”

The opening of the line to the public was scheduled for 14 March 1901 but was postponed to 1 May 1901 due to delays in the delivery of locomotives. Disagreements between SE and the department, which wished to modify the rolling stock defined in the contract, were the cause, as the line was completed before the machines were delivered. To allow the effective opening of the line, the Société générale des chemins de fer économiques had to bring in three of its Mallet locomotives from its Allier network. These were leased for the line until 30 March 1902.

From its inauguration, the mayors of Verneuil-l'Étang and Guignes requested the addition of a fourth train on Saturdays for the market. This service was introduced starting in 1905 on Saturdays, Sundays, and public holidays.

From 1 May to 31 December 1901, the line transported 46,035 passengers. During this period, it generated a turnover of 36,415 francs and its operating costs amounted to 33,672 francs, yielding a profit of 2,743 francs shared between the operator, the department, and the state.

==== Start ====
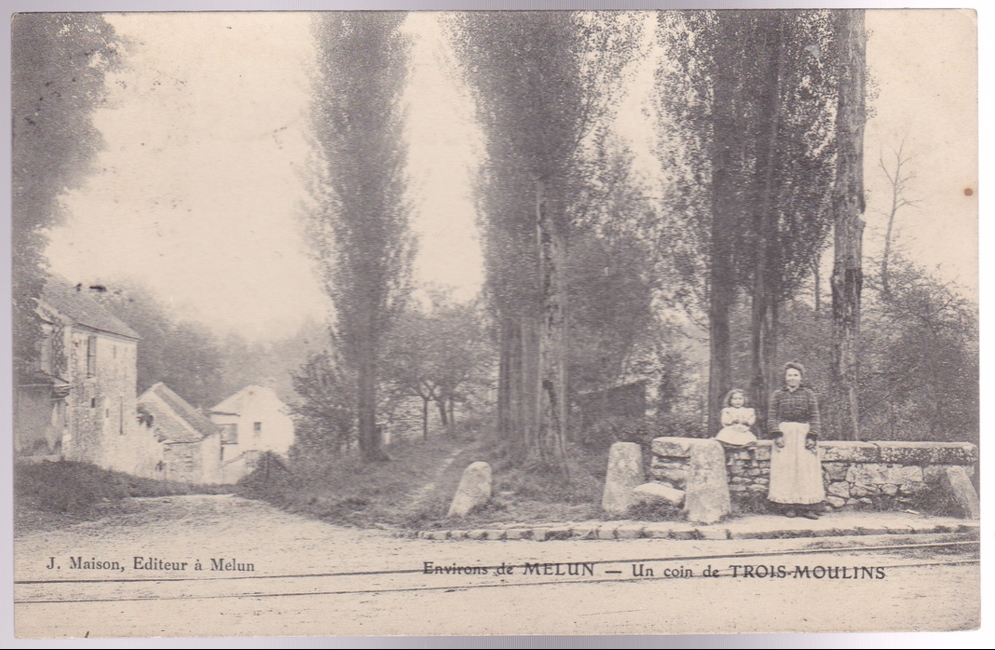
After crossing the Almont Bridge, at Trois Moulins in Melun, with the Verneuil tram tracks in the foreground, in 1908.

This secondary railway line enabled regular travel for residents and supported the commercial development of the towns thanks to additional service on market days, while also facilitating the transport of agricultural products to urban centers.

In 1903, the department sought to build a shelter for the Melun-Octroi halt due to unexpectedly high traffic. The stations of Verneuil, Guignes-Ville, and Melun-Ville were more frequently used, but the halt had a daily average of 17 passengers (boarding and alighting), compared to 12 for Saint-Germain-Laxis, 10 for Champdeuil-Crisenoy, and 22 for Guignes-Ville, all three being stations on the line. The traffic at Melun-Octroi continued to grow, and the station could no longer adhere to the rule that halts were to be marked only by a sign.

In August 1903, the department examined a project to link the Verneuil tramway to Melun station using the Melun electric tramway via a connection between the two. However, the project did not come to fruition, as by April 1905, no operator had come forward to manage the section to be created. For 1903, traffic reached 72,953 passengers, 307 dogs, 295 tons of luggage, and 2,332 tons of goods.

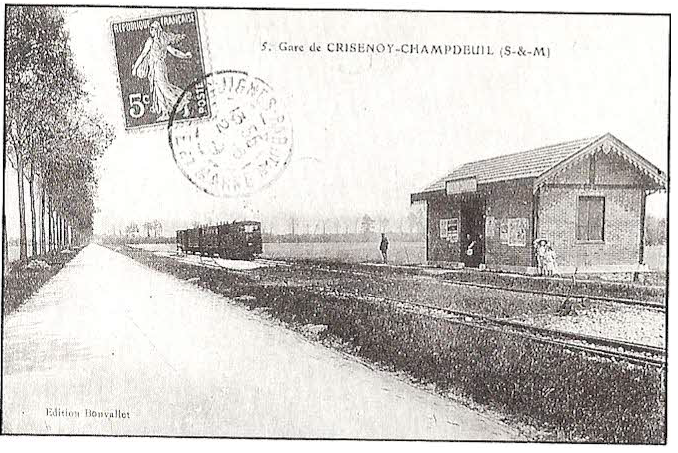
Champdeuil-Crisenoy station in 1906. The building had already undergone the transformations that would turn it into a halt.

In 1905, a shelter was built at the “Melun-Octroi” halt, costing 825 francs, and another at “Bordes,” costing 677 francs. The building of Champdeuil-Crisenoy station was converted into an open-access shelter, with no office, by removing the entrance door and replacing the glass door with solid panels due to repeated vandalism, which was facilitated by the station’s remote location in open countryside. It thus became, de facto, a simple halt. The standard-gauge track, located on the freight line of Verneuil mainline station, was extended to the tramway station. During the first five years of operation, revenue per kilometer increased from 2,945 francs in 1901 to 3,570 francs in 1905.

In 1908, an agreement was concluded between the Société des chemins de fer économiques and Mr. Guillon, owner of the Guignes sugar refinery, to connect the latter to the line linking Melun to Verneuil, via a branch line intended for freight. This branch became operational in October. The line’s revenues rose from 68,716 francs in 1907 to 71,796 francs in 1908.

By resolution of the municipal council of Crisenoy dated 13 November 1908, the commune requested that the tramway make a conditional stop at the road leading to the Champigny farm. However, the Société Économique opposed this project because a new stop would increase travel time and make connections at Verneuil-l'Étang more difficult. Moreover, the stop would be only 775 meters from the “Les Bordes” halt and 1.065 km from the “Champdeuil-Crisenoy” station. Finally, excluding the farm workers who did not reside there, the small population (seven inhabitants) did not justify such service. On 9 February 1909, the conseil général rejected the request.

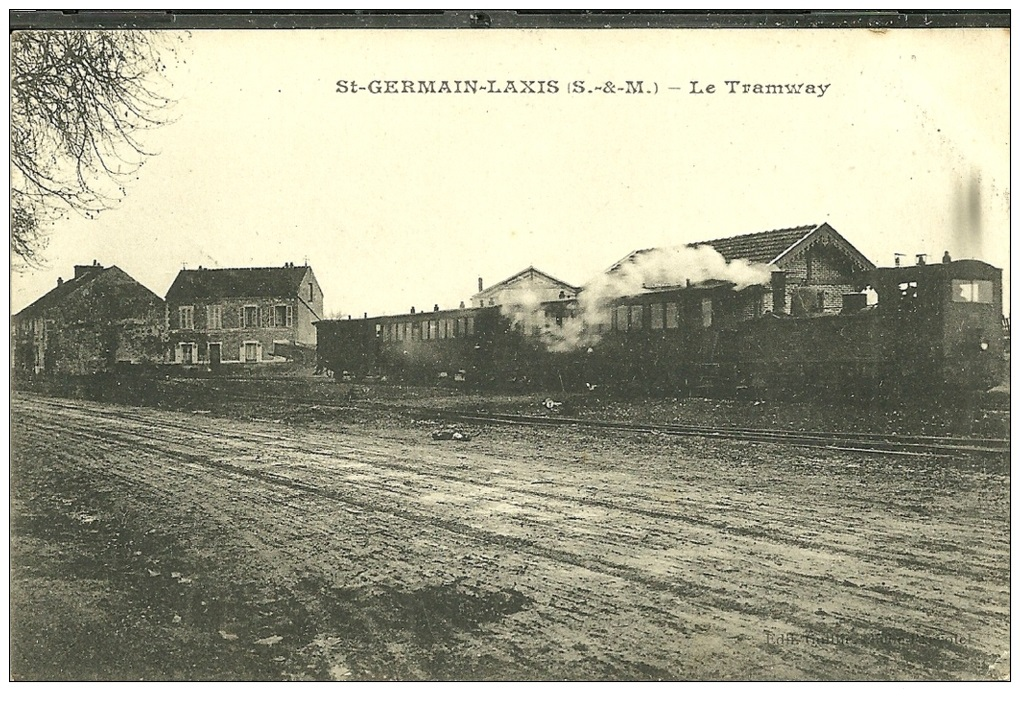
Saint-Germain-Laxis station at the beginning of the 20th century.

In 1909, the facilities of Saint-Germain-Laxis station became inadequate for the sugar beet campaign. For loading and unloading beets, it had only two dead-end tracks of 25 meters each, built on the roadside, with stone paving for vehicle access. The issue was that the spacing of the tracks was only 3.80 meters; when a cart was loading or unloading, the horse’s head projected onto the track, which had not been dangerous at the start of the line with its modest traffic but had now become a problem due to increased agricultural production. Furthermore, harvesting in rainy weather severely damaged the road where the tracks were laid. In addition, the tracks were no longer sufficient for a harvest that had grown from 3,500 to 7,000–8,000 tons, especially since the connection of the line to the Guignes sugar refinery. To address this problem, a siding track was built for 3,400 francs. That same year, the municipal councils of the communes of Saint-Germain-Laxis, Yèbles, Moisenay, Rubelles, and Verneuil-l'Étang requested from the SE an additional round-trip train on Saturday mornings to reach the Melun supply market. However, the company concluded that such a service would be of little use and might cause a financial loss of 925 francs per year.

With the construction of the connection between the Melun-Verneuil line and the Guignes sugar refinery, beet traffic doubled, and the Champdeuil-Crisenoy halt, which had previously shipped only about ten freight wagons, then handled 4,000 tons of beets and 2,600 tons of beet pulp. To allow a better connection between “Guignes-Sucrerie” and “Champdeuil-Crisenoy,” the track at the latter, which was then a dead end on the Verneuil side, was connected to the main track in 1910.

==== Success ====
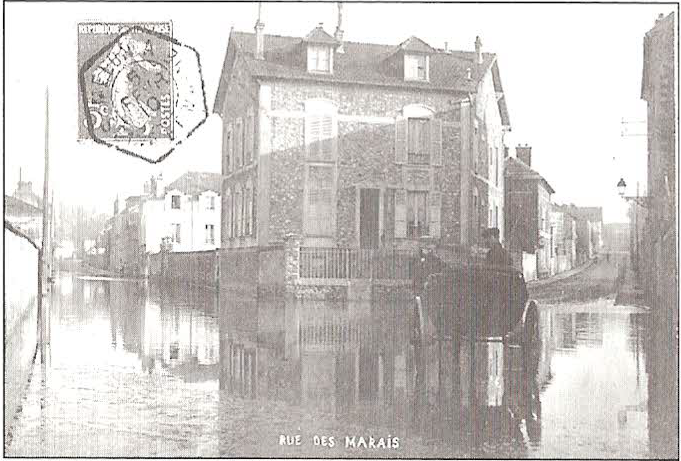
Rue du Marais in 1910 under 10 cm of water; the tram tracks are no longer visible.

Following the considerable increase in beet production to be transported to the Guignes sugar refinery since its connection to the line, rising from 4,500 tons in 1908 to 8,280 tons in 1909, with a forecast of 13,700 tons bound for Guignes and 4,400 tons for the Nangis sugar refinery, it was decided that transport by 14 vehicles would be supplemented by several cars from the rest of the network as well as by the purchase of 12 wagons for a total cost of 45,600 francs.

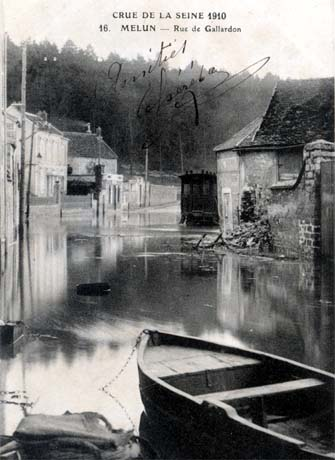
Rue de Gaillardon during the floods of 1910; at least one train car can be seen in the depot. The station is unusable.

On 12 October 1909, the SE announced that Champdeuil-Crisenoy station was the only station on the line without lighting, while the stations of Saint-Germain-Laxis and Guignes-Ville had had lighting since 1906. At nightfall, when the last train arrived, there was no light because the station had no permanent staff and was far from the nearby residences. The operator stated that it could not provide lighting, as it was up to the communes to supply the equipment, cover personnel expenses, and provide the “consumable materials.” On 9 September 1910, the operator offered an annual subsidy of 60 francs to each commune to cover lighting.

During the Seine flood of 1910, the old Melun station, located near the confluence of the Almont and the Seine, was submerged. From the Pré Gaillardon to the Rue des Marais, everything was under water. The tramway then terminated at the Melun-Octroi station, and the few passengers who disembarked there had to complete their journey by boat.

By resolution dated 29 January 1910, the Melun Chamber of Commerce requested that postal connections be transported by the tramway from Verneuil and Guignes to Melun, as well as to all points along the route where such service was necessary. The service was later implemented.

The line enjoyed heavy use, particularly for freight transport, with tonnage continuing to increase until 1914, thanks to the activities of the Guignes sugar refinery. Given this success, the conseillers généraux decided in 1910 to connect this isolated line to the rest of the narrow-gauge network by creating a branch from Saint-Germain-Laxis to Nangis. The project was at an advanced study stage, and the preliminary procedure for a declaration of public utility was progressing, but it was halted with France’s entry into the First World War.

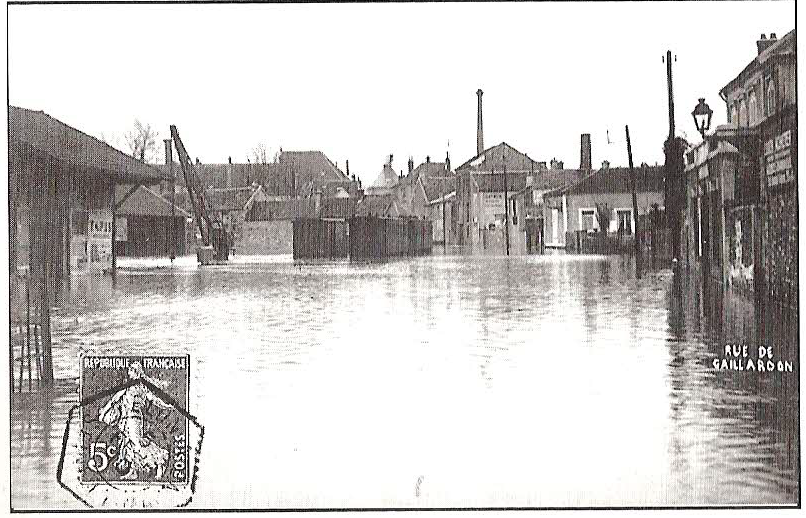
Melun-Ville station, the crane, and the trains under water during the 1910 flood.

In 1912, another project emerged to connect Melun-Ville station to the PLM station in Melun, passing through Place Saint-Jean, Boulevard Gambetta with a new bridge over the Seine, Rue Saint-Étienne, a second bridge over the Seine, Rue Saint-Ambroise, Rue Dajot, and finally Place de la Gare. This project was also stopped for the same reasons as the previous one.

At the beginning of 1914, an article in the tramway regulations caught the attention of the conseil général. It stated that it was forbidden to pick up or deliver passenger parcels or luggage outside the so-called “station-stops.” This rule was surprising, given that on the route only Saint-Germain-Laxis, Champdeuil-Crisenoy, and Guignes-Ville were stations. Passengers at other stops could only pick up or deliver their parcels at the goodwill of the staff; otherwise, they had to travel to the stations, which was impractical. From that date, luggage transport was also permitted to and from the halts.

At the same time, the department decided to build a siding at the “Rubelles-Voisenon” halt for the needs of beet harvesting.

=== Turning point of the First World War ===
==== Disruption at the outbreak of war ====
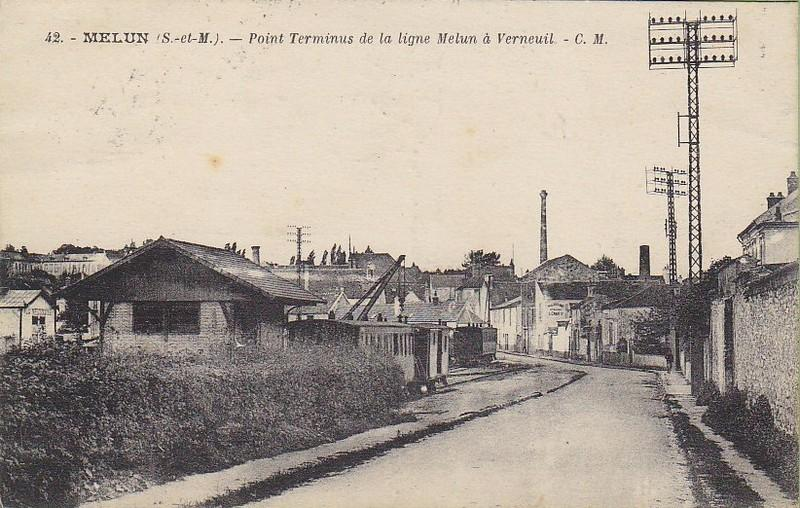
Melun-Ville terminus after 1913. The station is no longer maintained.

In August 1914, the order for general mobilization was posted in the stations. From 1 August, the line was involved in transporting troops, with three round trips until 8 August, after which the service was reduced to two round trips for civilian needs, while many special freight trains were put in place to transport army supplies. By the end of the month, a very large number of refugees, fleeing the German advance in the north of the department, took the tramway, which was unusually crowded for the occasion. These refugees desperately tried to find reception centers scattered throughout Melun.

On 5 September, faced with the advance of the German army, the personnel and equipment were requisitioned and had to reach Melun, with difficulty, as the roads were filled with refugees and soldiers. The service was suspended for twenty days due to the uncertainty of the fighting and the complete disorganization of the network. On 25 September, the service resumed with only two round trips (instead of three previously) and a heavy circulation of military and refugee trains. It also happened that German prisoners took the line to be sent to farms in Brie to replace the mobilized men.

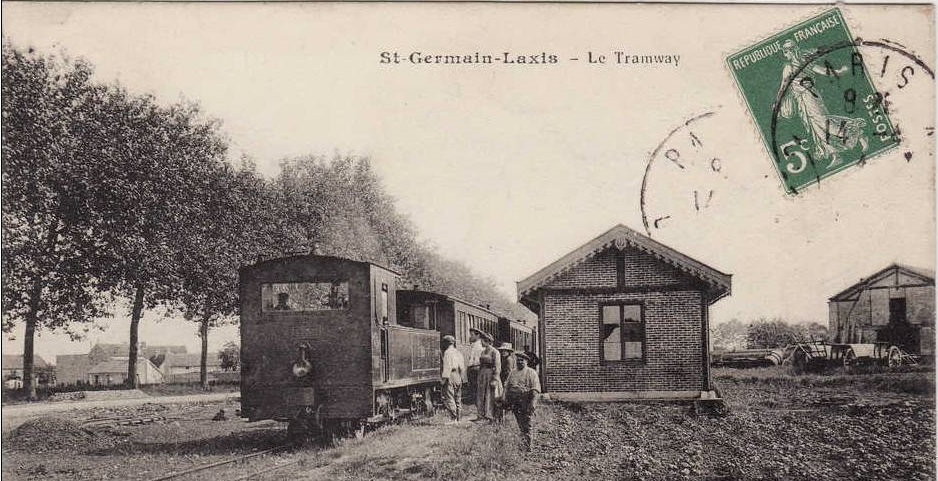
A train at Saint-Germain-Laxis station.

During the war, the profitability of the tramway became more difficult to maintain. Previously, revenue per kilometer in francs had been constantly increasing, reaching 4,815 F/km in 1910, 4,529 F/km in 1911, 4,891 F/km in 1912, and 5,244 F/km in 1913, before becoming more irregular and decreasing to 4,780 F/km in 1914, 4,333 F/km in 1915, and 4,557 F/km in 1916. Operating costs, however, generally decreased before the Great War. They were 2,998 F/km in 1910, 2,978 F/km in 1911, 2,930 F/km in 1912, 3,041 F/km in 1913, and 2,864 F/km in 1914; they then increased to 2,905 F/km in 1915 and 3,181 F/km in 1916.

The line experienced a decline in passenger traffic due to the continuation of the war. As for freight traffic, it remained steady despite limited resources. The reason for this stability was that, in addition to essential routine transport for local life, the line also carried scrap metal wagons to lumber, supply, or armament factories for the front. In 1915 and 1916, twenty wagons belonging to the sugar refineries of Guignes and Nangis were requisitioned to operate on the Toul-Thiaucourt line.

==== Line during the continuation of the conflict ====
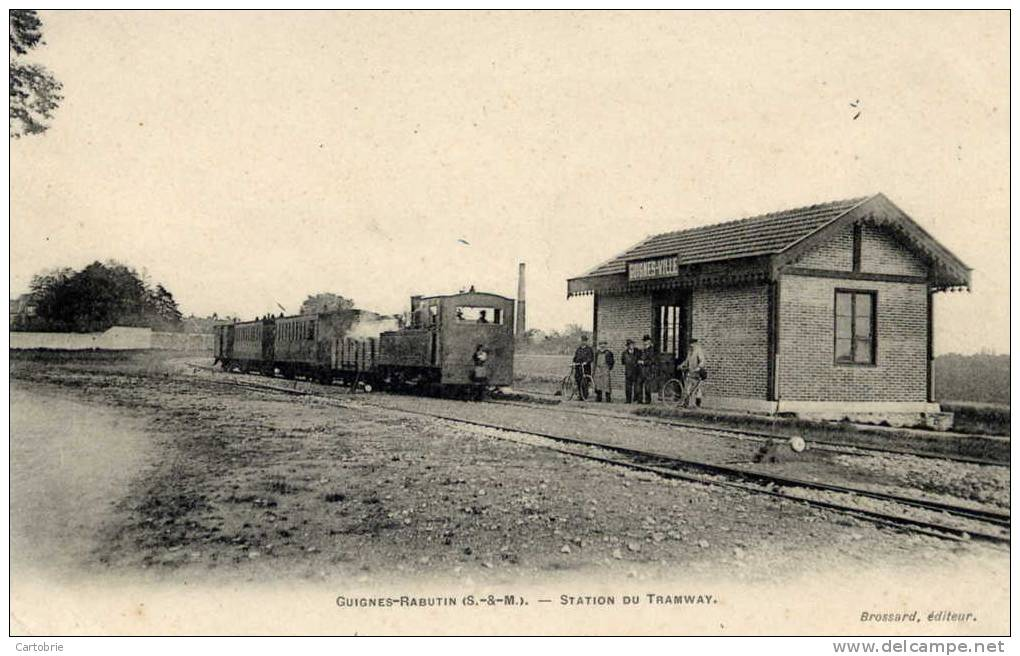
A mixed train at Guignes-Ville station before 1905.

The deliberation of 2 May 1916 led to the construction of an uncovered platform for the Guignes-Ville station. The work was to be partially financed by the town hall of the commune. However, the latter did not pay the sum of 249.90 francs that was due, contesting certain parts of the calculation. The prefectural council then ordered Guignes to pay the sum into the department’s treasury, which was done on 1 February 1917.

In 1916, the conseil général judged that the operation of the line did not require any particular renovations, unlike most of the other lines in the department. No changes were made to the track bed or to the halts, and the stations were considered to be in good condition. However, the rolling stock in good condition was insufficient to handle freight traffic, particularly the transport of sugar beets. To address this, the sugar refinery of Guignes provided the Société des chemins de fer économiques with eight tipper wagons, while the Nangis refinery provided four.

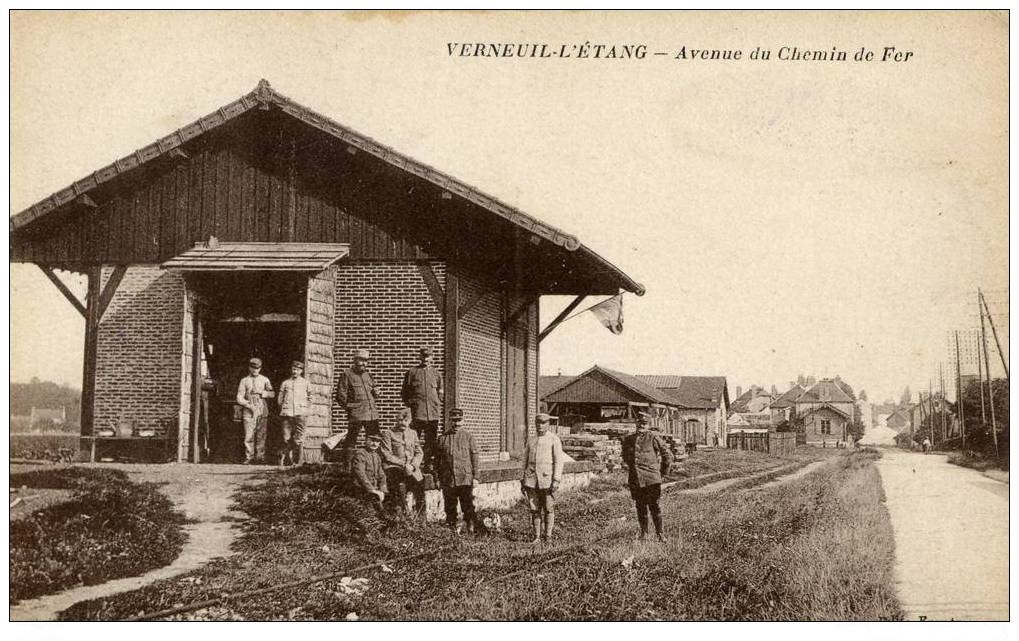
Verneuil tram station, between 1915 and 1917. It was then used by the military and the tracks were no longer maintained.

That same year, the three daily round trips were maintained, but the fourth one—on Saturdays, Sundays, and holidays—was not operated, despite annual revenues of 84,519 francs, compared to 80,364 in 1915 and 88,652 in 1914.

Also in 1916, the tramway became the subject of complaints from residents of Rue des Marais and its surroundings, who were subjected to the heavy smoke emitted during its passage. With the onset of the war, the SE was no longer able to obtain the high-quality coal it had previously used, and the thick black smoke from the locomotive invaded the street and entered houses with each passing train. It was therefore decided to avoid refueling the engines as much as possible near residential areas.

In 1917, passenger traffic, completely disrupted, was reduced to a single round trip, leaving Melun in the morning and returning from Verneuil in the evening. This schedule, poorly designed since travel was more commonly from the countryside to the prefecture, was later changed after many passengers requested its reversal.

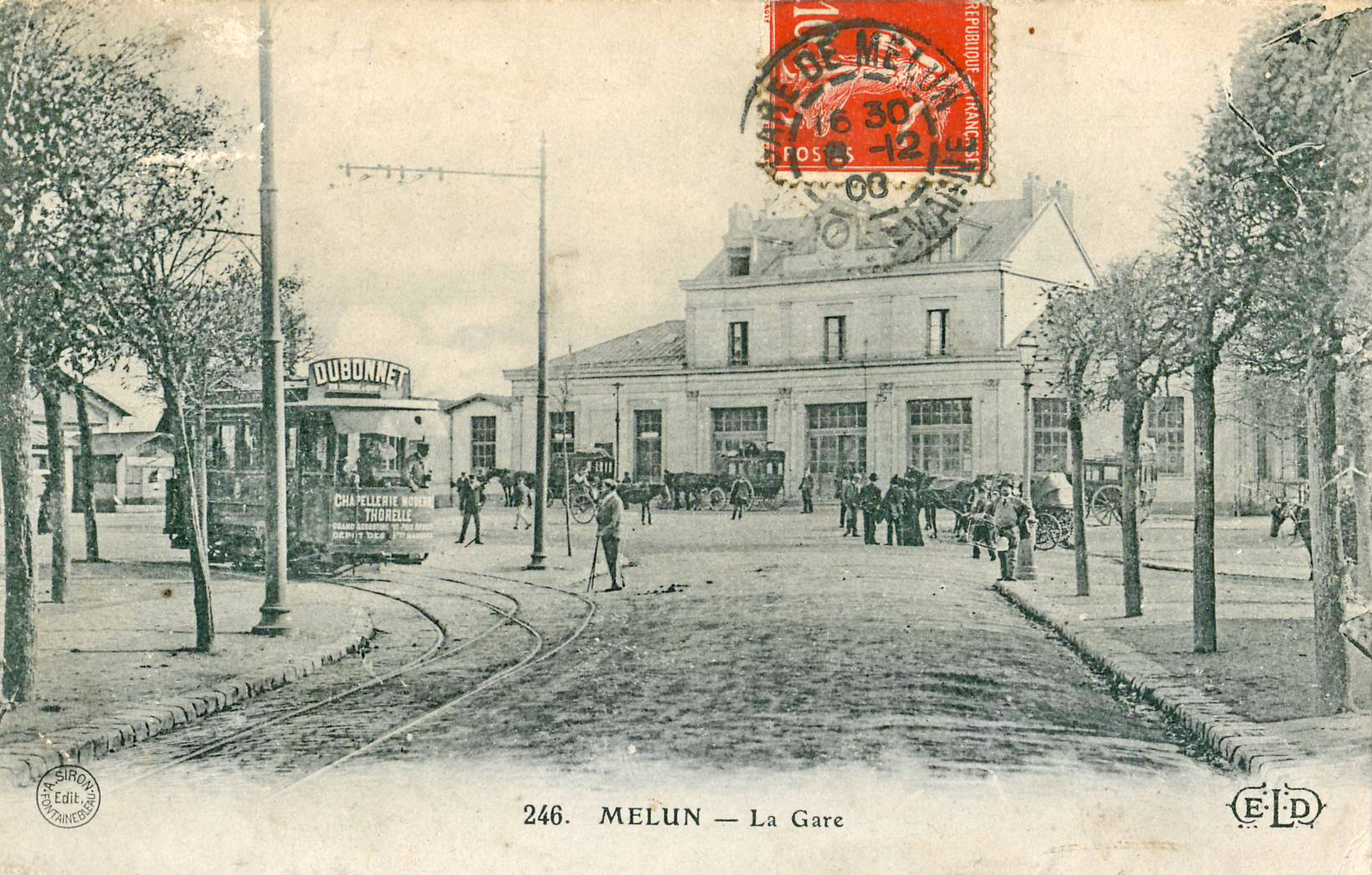
Melun station at the time of the Verneuil tramway. In the foreground, we can see a Melun tramway.

The tramway did not stop directly at Melun station. The Mail Gaillardon was located almost two kilometers from the main station, and the two stations were connected by the Melun tramway, which started near the PLM station and stopped at Rue Saint-Louis, close to the Verneuil tram stop. This urban tramway linked the two stops until 31 January 1917, when its operation ceased due to the deteriorated condition of the tracks. After January 1917, a bus service replaced this connection.

Until 1917, part of the sugar beet harvest was routed through Verneuil-l'Étang and then transported by train to the Nangis refinery, but from that date onwards, the harvest was sent exclusively to the Guignes refinery.

The line was used during the conflict both by soldiers (poilus) to reach the Eastern Railway line and by prisoners (generally German, Austro-Hungarian, or Bulgarian), escorted by the territorial infantry regiment, to be taken to Melun and placed in a camp. In the spring of 1918, around twenty Russian soldiers—representing symbolically the brigade sent by the Tsar’s empire to the West and unable to return due to the Treaty of Brest-Litovsk—spent a day and a night in one of the line’s trains while awaiting another destination.

In the autumn of 1918, about one hundred German prisoners spent an entire day at Melun-Ville station. During that season, due to a coal shortage, traffic was reduced to a single daily round trip, departing from Melun at 5 a.m. and returning at 8 p.m. Due to a shortage of new parts and personnel, the locomotives were in poor condition and frequently broke down during their runs. For the remainder of the year, service was maintained at two trains per day in each direction. Freight transport remained significant, and the Guignes refinery had to provide eight tipper wagons to the SE. At the time of the armistice on 11 November 1918, the line emerged from the war weakened, with worn and damaged equipment.

==== War aftermath ====
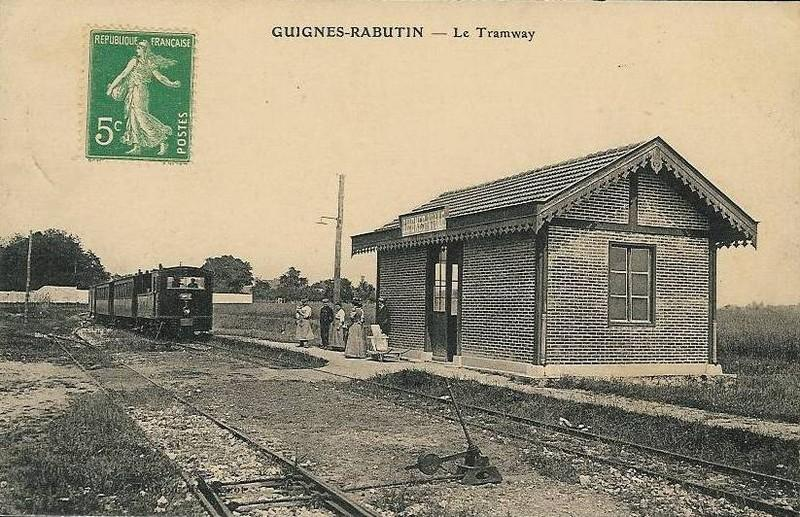
Guignes-Ville station before 1906.

The “decree of 23 November 1918” and the “finance law of 29 June 1918” led to an increase in tramway fares.

In 1919, the inhabitants of Maincy requested a shelter for their stop (without specifying whether it was for Trois-Moulins or Rubelles-Voisenon). The request was refused because it was deemed incomplete, non-essential, and likely to encourage all communes to ask for the same.

At the end of the war, the Jouy-le-Châtel workshop restored the equipment to working condition. Demobilized personnel worked on repairing the tracks, and the tramway regained some of its pre-war activity. From the beginning of 1919, due to the high number of passengers, traffic resumed with three daily round trips, compared to two previously, while the other lines of the network maintained lower service levels.

In 1920, a project was proposed to create a line running from Melun to Saint-Germain-Laxis, with a branch to Moisenay (Le Grand). However, the lack of funds led to its cancellation. Moreover, the project was oddly redundant with the existing tramway line.

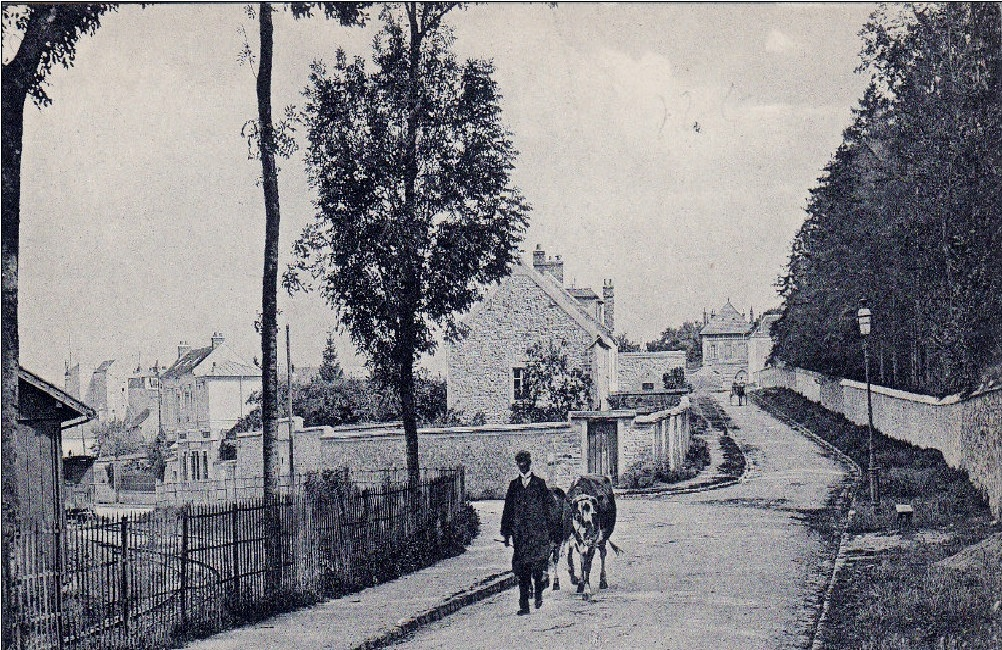
The Baron-Frélaut road in Melun at the beginning of the 20th century. On the left, a tram car and the Melun-Ville train station.

On 4 August 1920, faced with difficulties encountered by the sugar refinery during the beet harvest, the department voted to reconfigure the tracks at the Saint-Germain-Laxis station to achieve better agricultural efficiency, with a minimum cost of 11,000 francs and potentially up to 20,000 francs. To ensure traffic continuity, a section of track at the Champdeuil-Crisenoy station was temporarily used. Once the work was completed, the department voted for further reconfiguration of the station tracks by relocating the switches and lengthening the tracks. Initially estimated at 1,000 francs, the work ultimately cost 2,023.65 francs upon completion on 7 February 1921.

In 1921, the conseil général gave a favorable opinion for another project aimed at connecting the Verneuil-Melun line to the Jouy-le-Châtel–Marles-en-Brie lines as well as to the Lagny-Mortcerf line, but postponed the project while awaiting the resolution of the company’s financial problems.

The situation of the tramway improved; gross revenue, after taxes, was 124,548 francs in 1918, 144,426 francs in 1919, and 222,556 francs in 1920. In 1922, the line experienced strong passenger traffic compared to other lines of the network, with an average of 45 passengers per train. A report from the conseil général highlighted that it would be wise to increase the number of trains to boost traffic and to use a more powerful railcar. During that year, the line transported 54,237 passengers.

Between 1920 and 1922, the opening of quarries required for road restoration contributed to a significant increase in freight traffic.

In 1923, the position of sub-inspector for the line was abolished and integrated into the Bray-sur-Seine inspection office. At the end of December 1923, a flood similar to that of 1910 struck Melun. On 29 December 1923, the Seine reached 4.40 meters, and the Almont, which overflowed at the same time, began to flood the “Melun-Ville” station. On 2 January 1924, the Seine reached 5.38 meters, and once again the tramway had to stop at “Melun-Octroi.”

=== Decline of passenger service ===
==== Period of decline ====
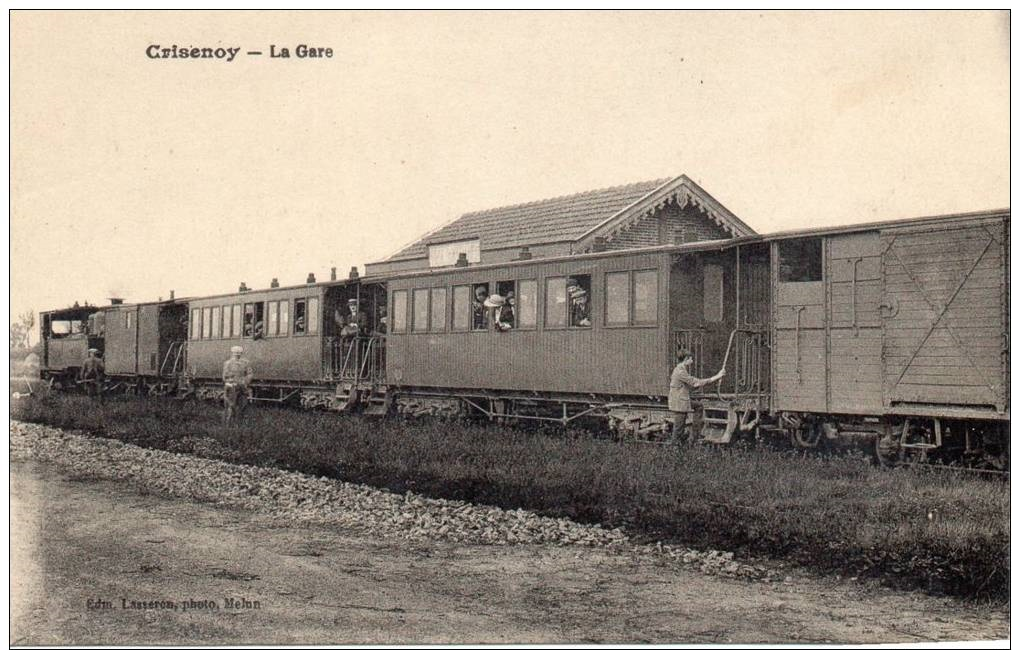
A mixed tramway at the Champdeuil-Crisenoy station in the early 1920s.

That same year, despite its short length, the line’s traffic—bringing in 1,825 francs from passenger and “Grande Vitesse” (express freight) services, and total revenue of 3,230 francs—was greater than that of the other lines in the network. However, the line now ran a deficit of 32,650 francs, or 1,765 F/km, despite fare increases of 150% for passengers, 200 to 250% for freight, and 250 to 300% for ancillary fees. The chief engineer proposed eliminating the third train, except on market days, to offset the deficit. The Verneuil line operated one more train than its counterparts on the Étoile de Jouy-le-Châtel network and even more than the Montereau–Égreville–Souppes–Château-Landon line, which was better frequented.

The importance of the line diminished rapidly, and traffic dropped sharply, as the communes it served were sparsely populated. In 1926, Verneuil-l'Étang had only 701 inhabitants, Guignes 1,031, Yèbles 282, Crisenoy 344, Champdeuil 203, Saint-Germain-Laxis 186, Rubelles 192, Voisenon 303, and Maincy 854. The city of Melun had 15,928 inhabitants, but it was served by several larger lines, such as the Paris-Lyon–Marseille-Saint-Charles line, which stopped at major stations. Although the populations of Verneuil-l'Étang and Guignes were growing, these towns were also served by more important lines, such as the Vincennes line or the Paris-Est–Mulhouse-Ville line. Furthermore, as a result of technological advancements during the war, the interwar period saw the development of private transport, which made the small, very slow line less attractive. In 1925, it took 56 minutes to travel the short distance between its termini, and the line offered only a few round trips. Moreover, trams had a poor reputation and could no longer compete with buses. The novelty, the impression of speed, the comfort, and the proximity of bus stops—unlike stations that were often far from town centers—caused many passengers to abandon the tramway for buses.

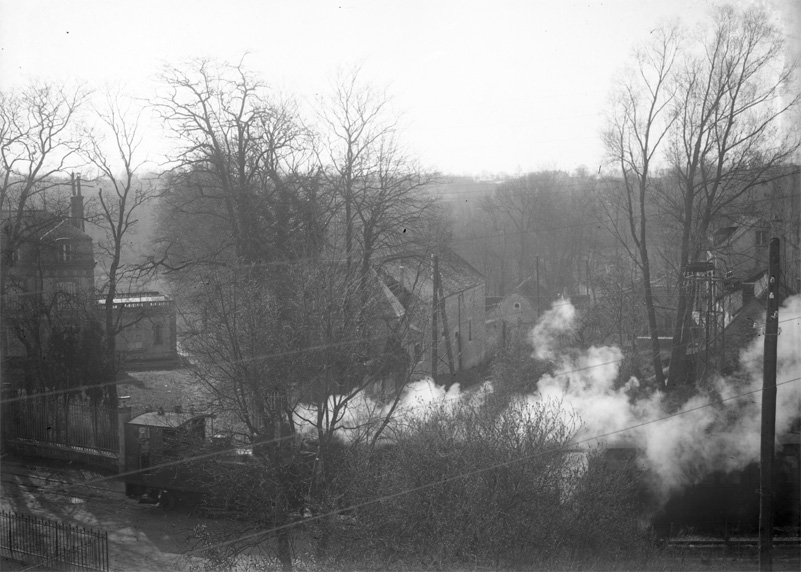
Verneuil tramway seen from the Château des Trois-Moulins, circa 1925. © Jonot Archives

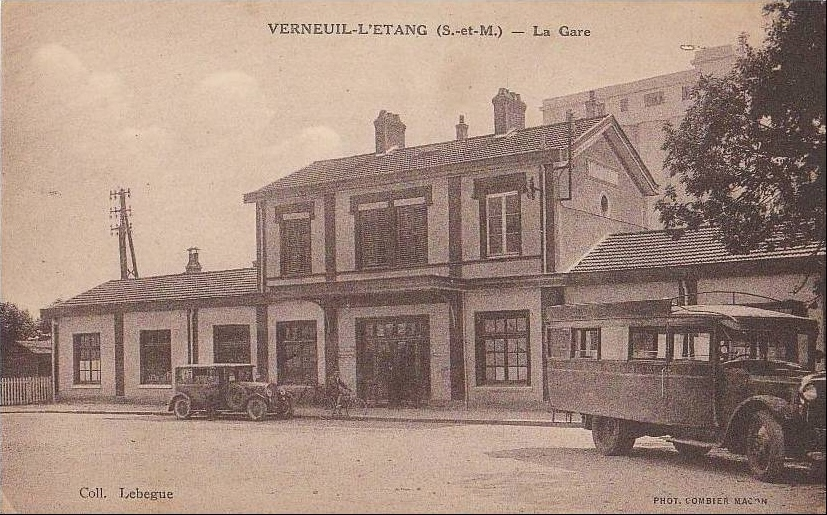
Buses arriving at Verneuil-l'Étang station in the early 1920s.

In 1927, as the conseil général, eager to counter road competition and make the tramway more efficient, faced the Compagnie Générale d'Entreprises Automobiles, which launched numerous bus lines in the department—including routes from Nangis to Melun and Coulommiers to Melun—that posed serious competition to the Verneuil–Melun line. As early as 1906, the department had foreseen the creation of such a line as “the ruin” of the Verneuil tramway. In addition, mechanics who sold and repaired automobiles could be found in the towns served by the line. Traffic declined very rapidly and significantly, despite the gradual return to normal service with three daily round trips compared to two on other network lines.

That same year, while the Melun electric tramway had been closed for 10 years, Georges Roy, banker and vice president of the Melun Chamber of Commerce, proposed that the department decommission the line and use part of it to connect the Verneuil tramway with the Melun–Barbizon line and reach Melun station. However, the project failed to interest the respective companies. Moreover, even though the steam tramway was compatible with the narrow-gauge tracks of the urban tramway, the passage of trains was deemed dangerous due to car traffic and the narrowness of the streets. The project was definitively abandoned, and from 30 May to mid-September 1927, the tracks were removed.

==== The gap between passenger service and freight service ====
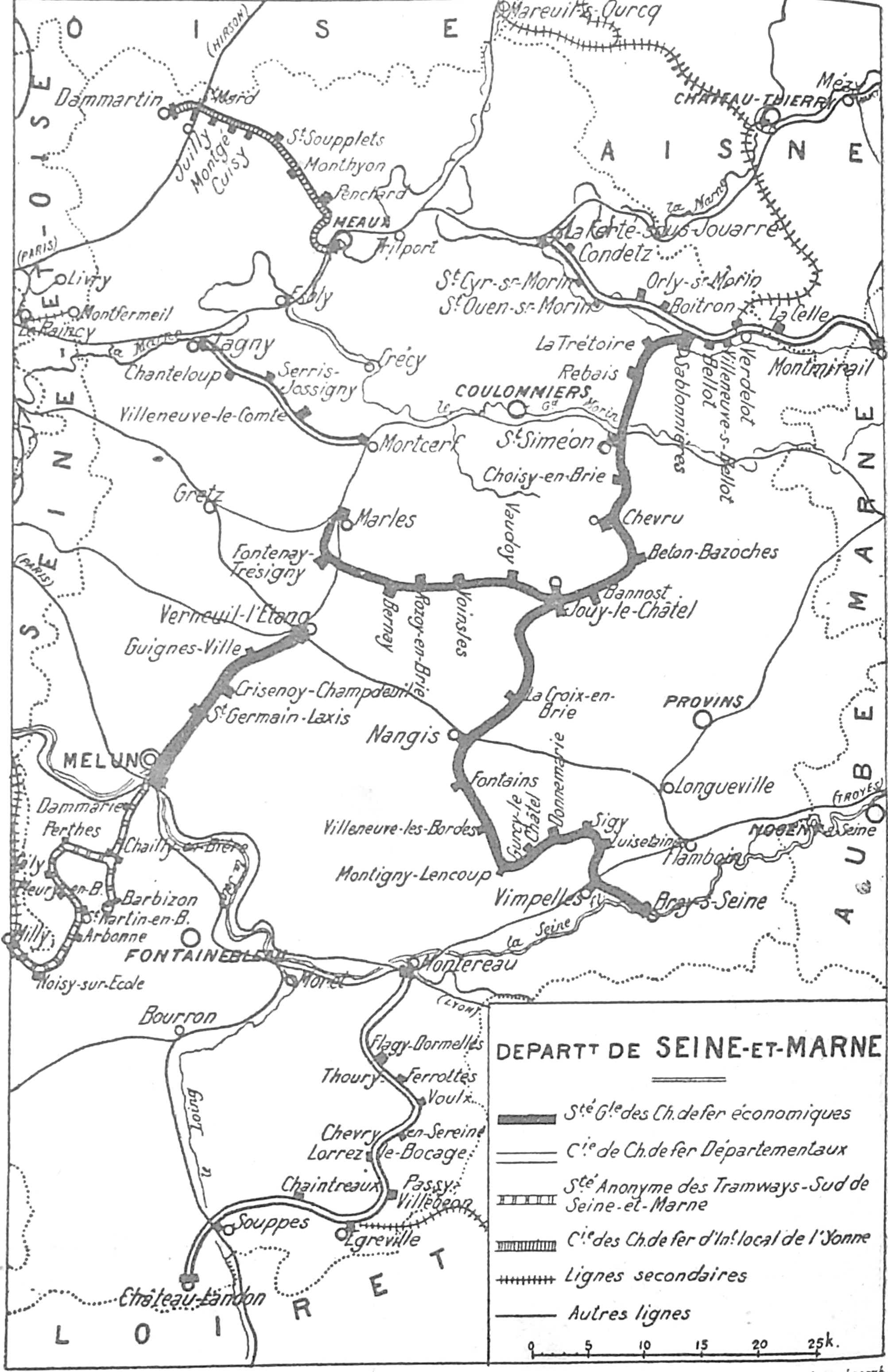
Map of the local railway network in the department of Seine-et-Marne, circa 1928.

In 1927, the line reached a record deficit, but in 1928 the situation improved thanks to the freight service, which had become more efficient and profitable. This increase was due to the monetary stabilization of recent months, which prompted shippers to closely monitor their production costs; rail freight remained the most attractive option for them. While the report from the conseil général highlighted this improvement, it also noted that passenger traffic was in dire straits. It continued to decline, and the report expressed doubt about any potential recovery in traffic because “the concept of speed has developed to such an extent that passengers no longer wish to submit to the slow pace of local-interest railway lines.” An alternative was considered: mixed tram/bus transport. However, it was suggested that the service remain as it was due to the significant changes in transportation that made the best choice uncertain. To reduce the line's deficit, the report proposed transferring passenger cars to another part of the network.

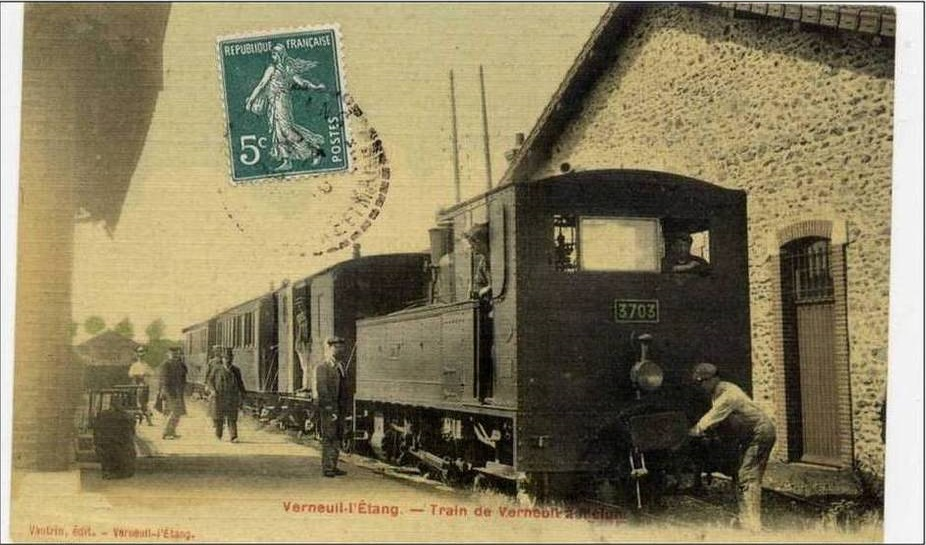
The tramway at Verneuil tramway station, next to the mainline station, before 1910.

That same year, it was decided to keep the Verneuil-to-Melun and Jouy-le-Châtel-to-Marles-en-Brie lines, unlike the Bray-sur-Seine-to-Sablonnières line, which, around 1931, was converted into a bus route. The Verneuil tram then underwent maintenance work on the network. In 1928, the Melun-to-Verneuil bus line was created under the management of the Société auxiliaire des transports de l'Est (SATE). However, traffic proved disastrous, with almost no passengers, as travelers wishing to go from Meaux to Melun preferred to pass through Paris, where they could take care of personal business. Plans were made to discontinue the line in 1929.

Several passenger cars stationed at Verneuil station had not been used for several years, largely due to the drop in traffic. To avoid the deterioration of equipment and cover operating costs, the department sold them in 1928.

Nevertheless, freight traffic, although limited to one optional train per day, was performing rather well, with a sharp increase during the beet campaigns, requiring numerous additional convoys depending on demand. The slow movement of mixed trains discouraged passengers, and user traffic continued to decline. However, the early 1930s saw a significant increase in the exceptional transport of beets to the Guignes sugar refinery, rising from 19,000 tons for the 1929–1930 campaign to 29,100 tons for the 1930–1931 campaign. In 1930, the equipment was no longer sufficient to carry all the goods, even though, as in previous years, the department had transferred ten wagons from the Étoile de Jouy-le-Châtel to the Verneuil line for the occasion. Increased train rotations allowed up to three trips per day for each wagon. The sugar refinery then purchased ten new wagons. Furthermore, the department planned to purchase fourteen open wagons for upcoming harvests.

==== The closure of the line to passenger traffic ====
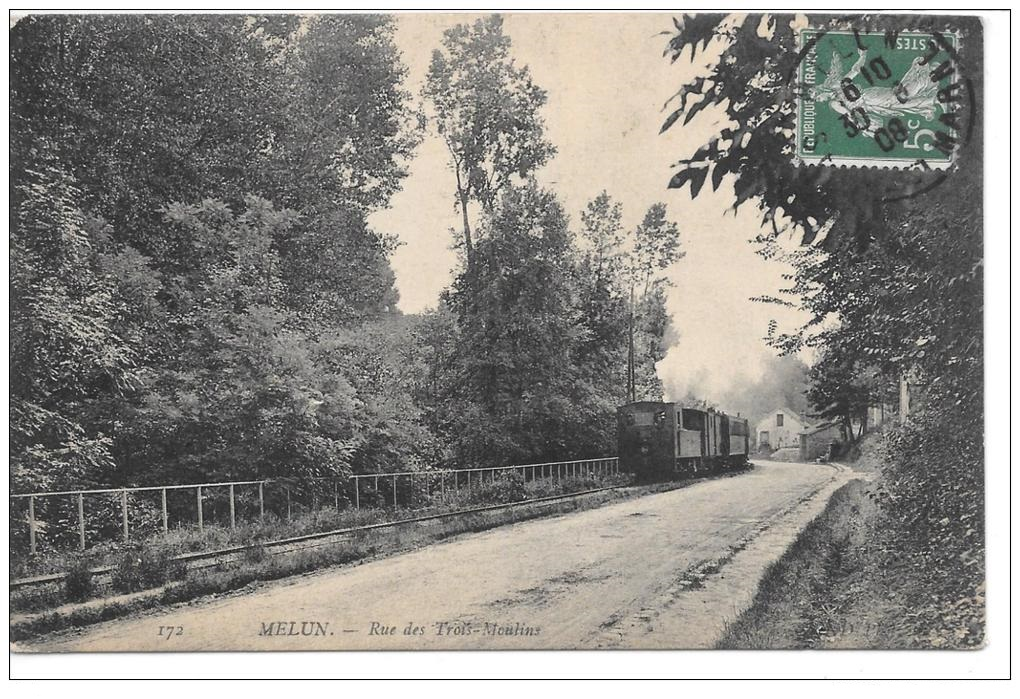
The old car near the Trois-Moulins train station in Maincy, before 1913.

Beyond rail/road competition and the decline in passenger traffic, other factors contributed to the line’s deficit. First, the “Eight-Hour Law” of 23 April 1919 reduced the workday for employees from 12 to 8 hours, except for workshop staff, who worked 10 hours. Then, the “Law of 22 July 1922” created a pension scheme for tramway employees, with the SE’s contribution rising from 6% in 1922 to 6.5% in 1930, and then 7% in 1933. These expenses were compounded by the coordination of the pension scheme and social security costs. Taxes levied by the state increased by a factor of 14.8 between 1913 and 1930 across all the lines in Seine-et-Marne. Finally, fuel, raw materials, and metals underwent significant price increases. The tramway fare increases were not sufficient to cover expenses.

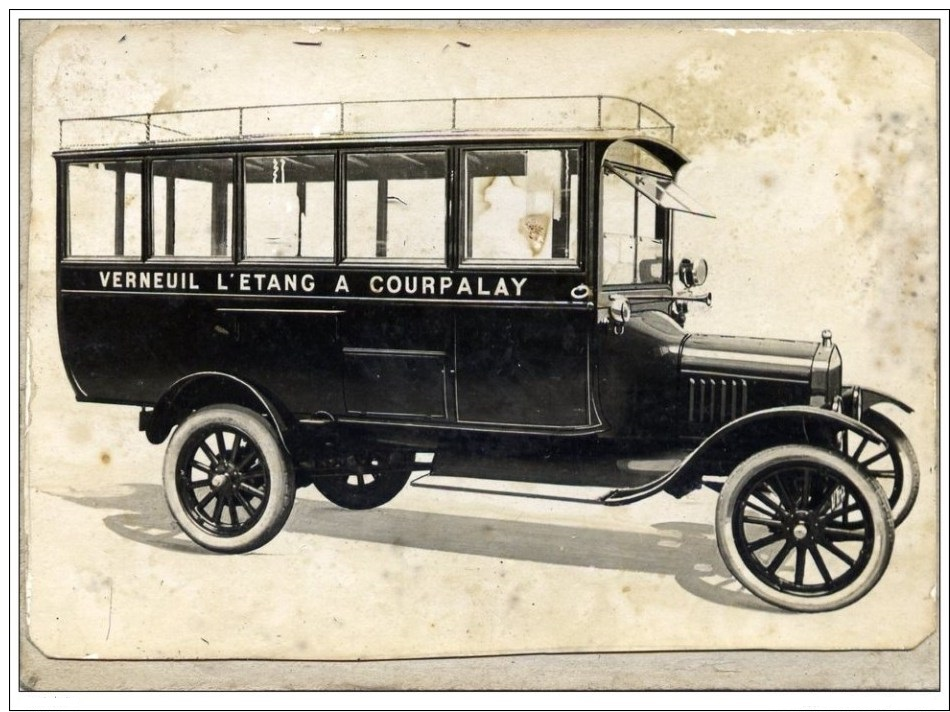
Example of a Seine-et-Marne bus used on the Verneuil-l'Etang to Courpalay line in 1932. Illustration from the early 20th century.

This decline in traffic worried the conseil général, which decided to consider the future of the network and the line. In 1933, during initial discussions, the line was to remain open to passenger traffic, unlike other lines in the network, and was envisioned as a mixed tram/bus service to reduce deficits. The line was in decline, but compared to other lines, it was considered difficult to leave a town of Guignes' importance without connections to the prefecture. Moreover, it was important to have a connection between the Eastern and Lyon-Méditerranée rail networks. The line’s passenger service, although in freefall and providing poor-quality service, still generated 70,000 francs per year. The conseillers généraux hoped the line would regain its pre-war revenues of 240,000 francs. However, the gap widened across the network between freight service, which brought in 1,281,289 francs in revenue, and passenger service, which generated only 255,540 francs. In addition, replacing the line with a bus service would allow access to the left bank of the Seine in Melun and thus the mainline station, which the Verneuil tramway did not reach.

The line, facing difficult competition from automobiles, was doomed to see its passenger traffic collapse. To eliminate the operating deficit, the line had to be closed and the mixed service discontinued. On 26 September 1933, it was decided to close the secondary railway network to passenger traffic on a trial basis, for a limited duration starting 1 April 1934.

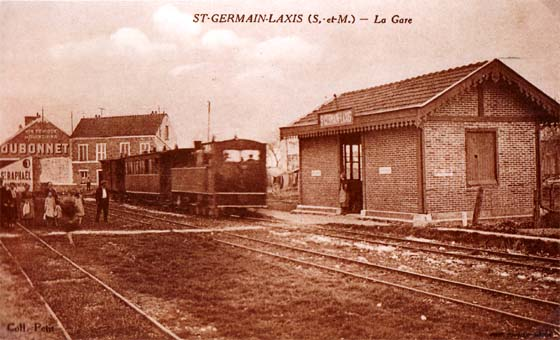
Saint-Germain-Laxis station in the 1930s. This was one of the last passenger services.

On 15 January 1934 (or the 28th, according to other sources), the line was closed to passenger traffic on a trial basis. Bus replacement began on 1 or 18 March, with the advantage of serving town centers.

On 3 March 1934, the department set the start date for the operation of the line by buses. It remained operated by SE, with 27-seat “Saurer” buses belonging to the company. The vehicle was stored in the outbuildings of the Verneuil tram station. The staff consisted of a driver and an assistant. All stops were maintained by the bus, including the conditional stop at “Vulaines-Suscy.” In addition to these stops, the bus extended beyond Melun-Ville station to the PLM station in Melun. Furthermore, it made a “slight detour” between the “Bordes” and “Champdeuil-Crisenoy” stops to serve the center of the village of Crisenoy and its hamlet of Bordes. Guignes, which retained its stops at “Guignes-Sucrerie” and “Guignes-Ville,” gained an additional stop, “Guignes-Hôtel de Ville,” located in the town center.

The total length of the bus-operated line was 20.5 km, longer than the tramway, with a total of 16 stops. The bus ran three round trips plus a fourth on a trial basis to assess profitability, on Saturdays, Sundays, and public holidays, mainly for the Melun market. The bus took 52 minutes to complete its route. In November 1935, the results obtained by the Verneuil-Melun bus service proved very satisfactory.

=== End of the line ===
==== The closure of the line to freight traffic ====
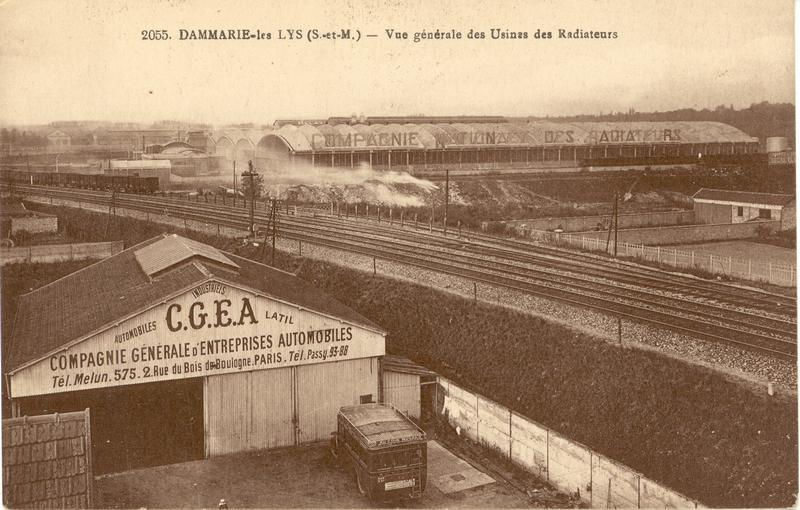
C.G.E.A. bus garage serving Melun and its surroundings, in Dammarie-les-lys in 1935.

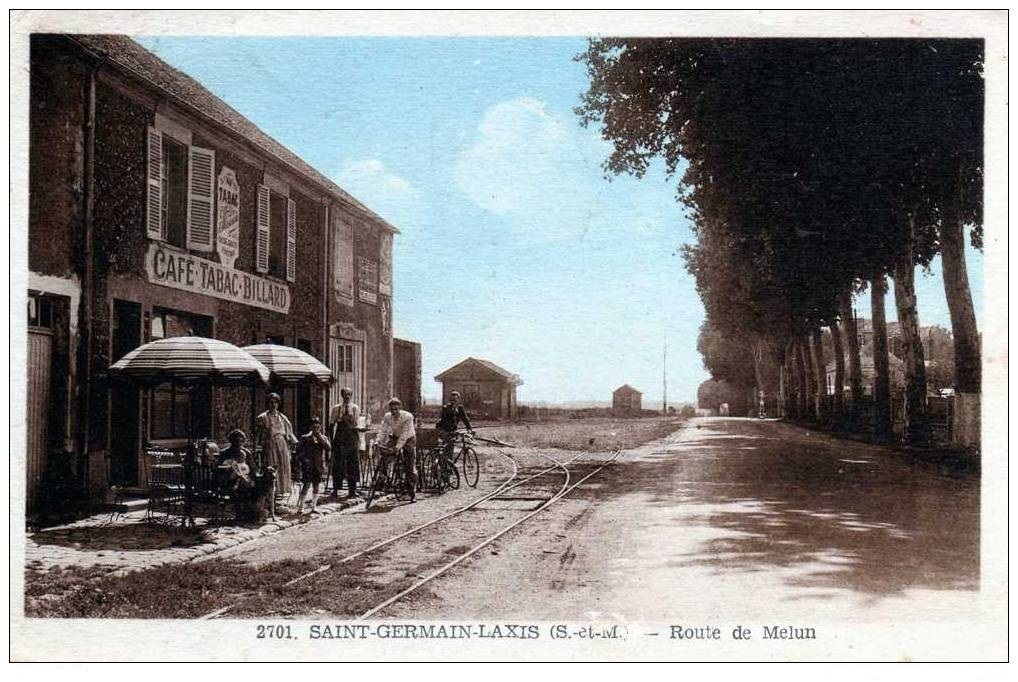
Café de Saint-Germain-Laxis with the tracks and station in the background, in 1935, when the line was no longer carrying passengers.

The deficit of the line and the entire network decreased with the elimination of passenger traffic. It amounted to 1,057,990 francs for the entire network in 1933 and dropped to 753,335 francs in 1935.

Freight traffic remained, consisting of a round trip reinforced by additional transport, particularly during the beet campaigns, as well as postal service provided by trolleys every day of the week, including Sundays. Starting in July 1934, SE requested the discontinuation of this Sunday service, which the department refused.

However, the major flaw of this line and the rest of the network for freight traffic was its metric-gauge track. Not being standard gauge, it was impossible to use the equipment of the Compagnie des chemins de fer de l’Est. The transshipment of goods from one line to the other was necessary, which resulted in a loss of time and significant labor costs.

In 1937, as several cars were no longer in use, the conseil général asked the engineer of Ponts et Chaussées to determine which equipment could be disposed of without disrupting service. After review, four cars from the line’s stock, stationed at Verneuil, were put up for sale.

The department began closing the line to freight traffic. To reduce operating losses, SE requested, on 14 October 1937, the closure of freight traffic between Melun and Rubelles over 3.7 kilometers. This section, being little involved in beet transport, brought in only 1,100 francs per year. The estimated savings from closing this section were 26,000 francs per year. The department, eager to achieve as much savings as possible, voted for this resolution. The closure of this section became effective on 1 January 1938.

However, the growing deficit of the line, as well as that of the rest of the department’s tramways, was a cause for concern for the conseil général. It was then stated that the proposed solution was only “the beginning of the measures that will be taken” during the next session, once the study requested by the department from the Special Commission on the situation was available. The remaining section, open to freight traffic, was only truly used during the beet campaigns. Once the study was known, at the next session, the part still open was also closed on a trial basis. On 1 September 1938, the line was closed to freight traffic.

==== Second World War and brief revival of use ====
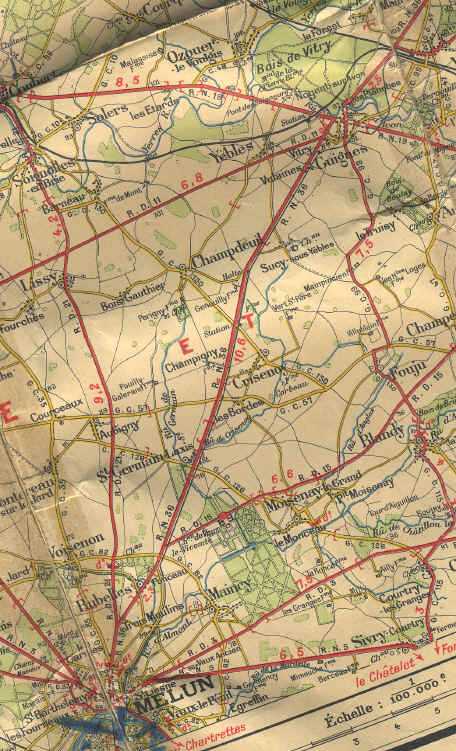
1940 Michelin road map showing the entire tramway route.

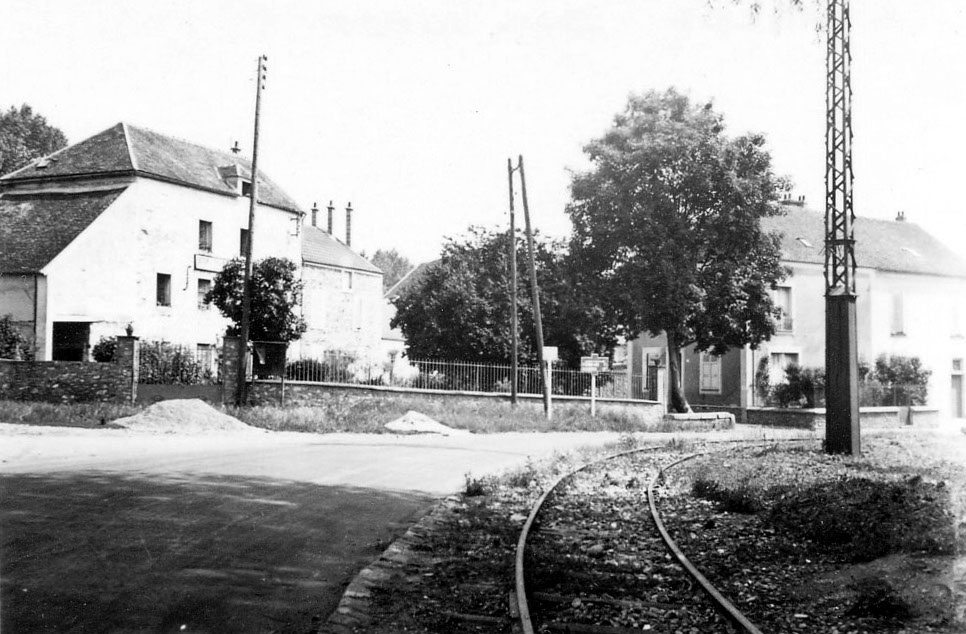
Tram tracks at Trois-Moulins, shortly before 1940 © Jonot Archives.

However, in order to preserve the line’s future, the tracks were kept in place so that it could be “used as a toll line” by the Guignes sugar refinery during the beet campaigns between Rubelles and Verneuil. In 1939, the refinery obtained authorization from the departmental commission to use the section from Verneuil to Rubelles as well as the necessary branch lines for beet and pulp transport during the beet campaigns. It was authorized to rent a locomotive and 32 open wagons, at a daily rental fee of 100 francs for the locomotive and 5 francs per wagon. The line remained open over 14.608 km of its original 18.36 km. The use of the line as a toll line was formalized by an agreement with the Guignes sugar refinery dated 8 March 1939. With this agreement, the refinery could use the tramway for its needs but was responsible for maintaining and repairing the tracks.

That same year, with the approval of the departmental commission, 300 meters of track and a turntable from the line were sold for 4,960 francs and 1,500 francs, respectively, to the Nangis sugar refinery. The unused Melun-Ville freight station was rented to a merchant from Melun for 800 francs per year. In 1940, the Melun-Ville passenger station was in turn rented for 160 francs per year, and the rails between Melun and Rubelles were sold for 50,000 francs. In 1941, Seine-et-Marne spent 562,111 francs to cover the operating deficit of the lines from Verneuil to Melun, Jouy to Marles, and Bray to La Sablonnière, and the costs of supervision and monitoring of the Verneuil tramway amounted to 18,546 francs. That same year, the chief engineer stated that the department did not intend to retain the railway function of the area reserved “for the Verneuil railway” in Melun and that, if necessary, the city would have the possibility of renting it for the creation of a sports field and a gymnasium.

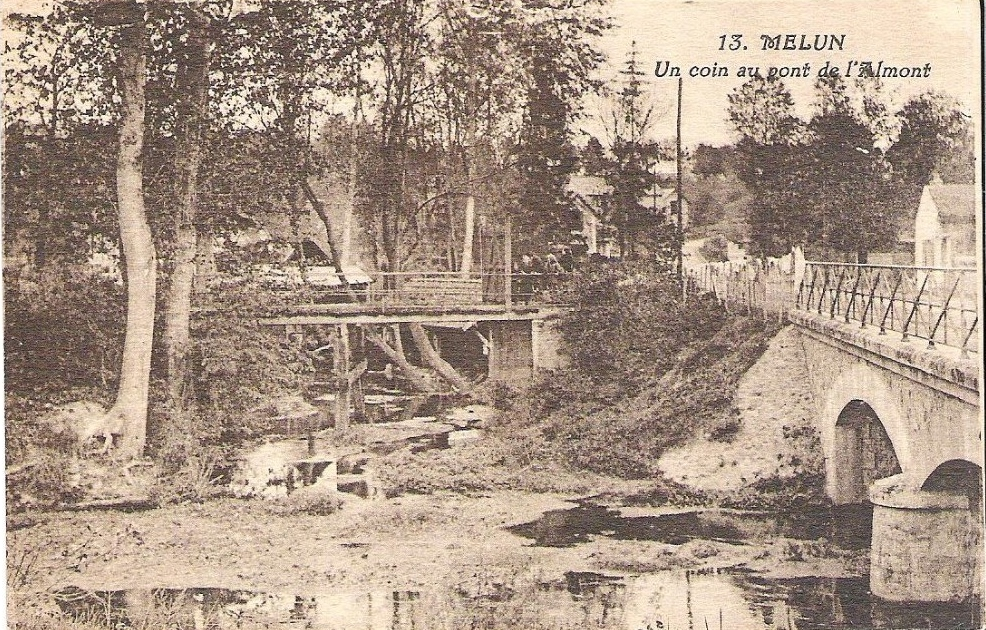
The Almont and the eponymous bridge in Melun at the beginning of the 20th century. The tram tracks are faintly visible on the bridge, as is the Bellevue tollgate in the background on the right.

The dismantling of the tracks was carried out between Melun and Rubelles during the 1940s. First, in 1943, Mr. Ouvré fils and the sugar refinery and distillery of Souppes-sur-Loing requested the acquisition of part of the line’s now-disused tracks to repair and improve a metric-gauge branch line. However, the sale of materials resulting from the removal of local-interest railway tracks was prohibited by ministerial instructions; the applicant could only lease them. The company rented 400 meters of Vignole rails and 94 fishplates. Nevertheless, the department reserved the right to terminate this agreement with three months’ notice if the need arose to resume operation of the line.

Furthermore, during this decade, SE removed some rails to carry out maintenance work on the Bray-sur-Seine to Beton-Bazoches section of the Bray to Sablonnières line, which was still in operation. In total, the tracks were removed from PK 0 to PK 1.8 and from PK 1.95 to PK 2.150. The necessary work to restore the public roads used was properly carried out at the time of dismantling. Only the Trois-Moulins area retained rails, but they were unusable. Thanks to the Guignes sugar refinery, the line maintained relatively significant activity from Rubelles to Verneuil-l’Étang.

During the Second World War, unlike the other two lines of the network, the passenger service of the Verneuil-Melun line was not reopened. Moreover, the inability to reach Melun from other towns by tramway due to the dismantling of the tracks reduced the interest in such a reopening. In 1939, the substitute bus line had a deficit of only 60,000 francs.

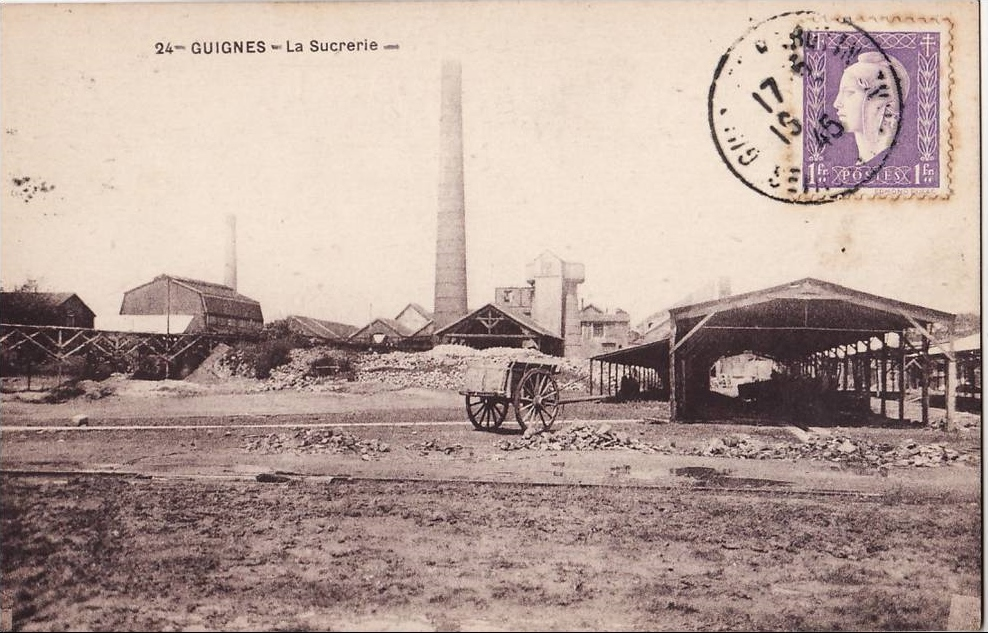
Guignes sugar refinery with the railroad tracks in the foreground, early 20th century.

On 25 and 26 August 1944, after fighting to cross the Seine, the American army advanced toward Meaux. Tanks and heavy military equipment passed along the RN36 and over the track. The damage caused by this army was significant for the line, particularly at three damaged locations. Track repair work took place from September to October 1945 at the Genouilly junction, with the replacement of 48 meters of track, at the Crisenoy crossing with 56 meters of track, and at the Bordes road with 16 meters of track, as well as numerous sleepers replaced at these locations, along with crushed spikes and fishplates. The owner of the sugar refinery, Marcel Rivière, who had to pay for the repairs alone due to the 1939 agreement, received reimbursement for these works as war damages on 3 May 1962.

At the session of 10 December 1946, the department authorized, at the request of the municipality of Chaumes-en-Brie, the extension of the Verneuil-to-Melun bus line to Marles-en-Brie, to serve Chaumes and Fontenay-Trésigny, with Verneuil-l’Étang remaining as the main hub.

==== Permanent closure and disappearance ====
Bernard Caron (Note: Author of the book Saint-Germain-Laxis, le village qui m'a vu naître, Ammateis Editions, 1984.) states that the line was used as a toll line until 1944 and that the railway track was dismantled in 1945. The line was still in place at that date, but its situation remained precarious. It had been used only by the sugar refinery for several years, and only for a few months each year. In 1946, the network’s deficit stood at 750,000 francs. Moreover, the sugar refinery experienced economic difficulties and was liquidated in January 1954.

On 3 December 1948, through a letter addressed to the department, it requested the termination of the 1939 agreement. Freight service continued, with difficulty, until 1949, the date of the last use of the line by the sugar refinery, ten years after its reopening as a toll line.

In 1950, the local management of SE relocated to occupy the passenger station building of Melun-Ville, which had previously been unused.

That same year, in January, the conseil général decided to examine the future of the line. With the cessation of beet harvesting, “the tramway no longer carries any traffic, and there is no reason to consider resuming operations in the future.” Should a decision to decommission be made, 16.546 km of track would need to be removed, from PK 1.8 to PK 1.960 and from PK 2.150 to PK 18.546, representing 650 tons of materials.

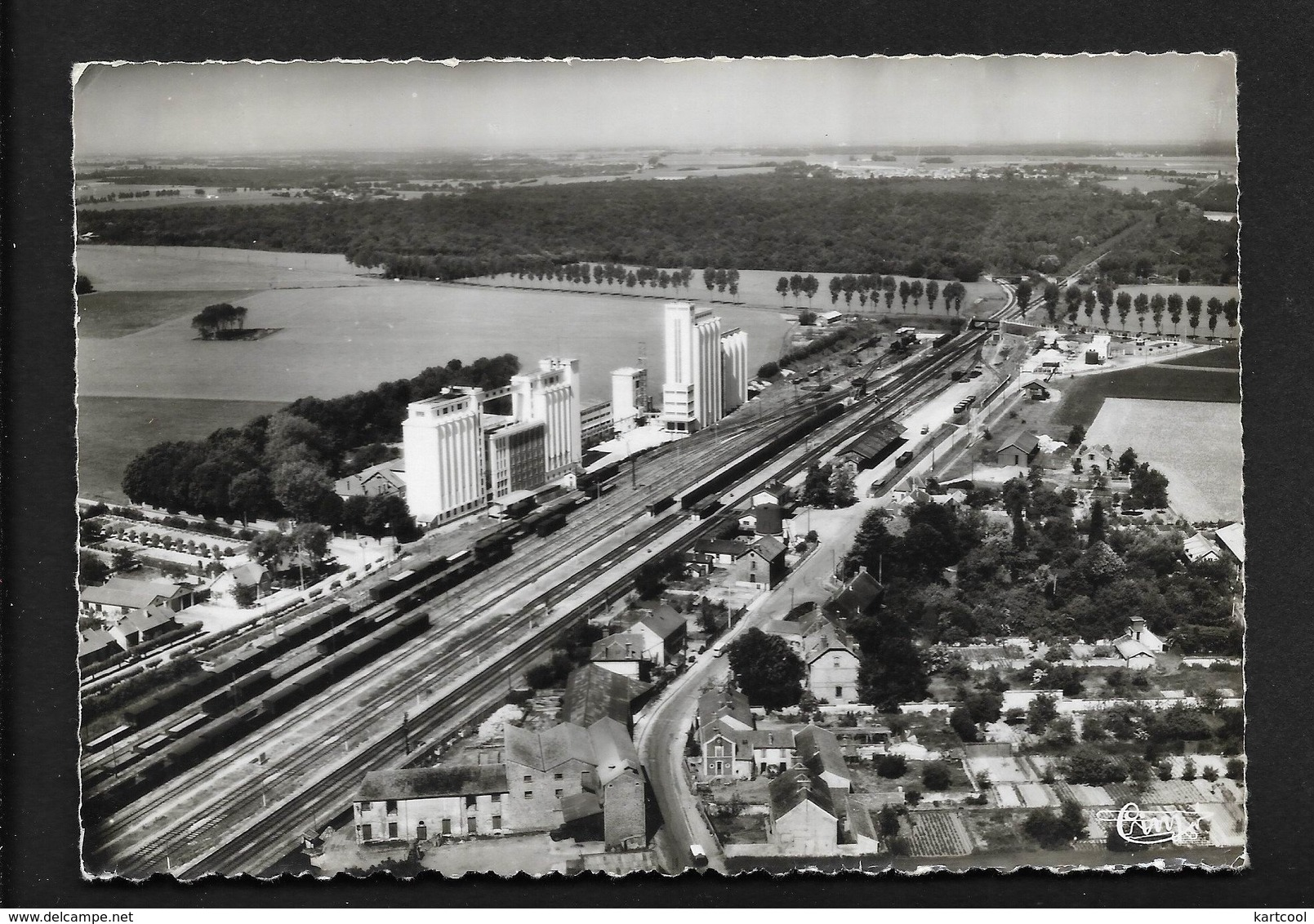
Aerial view of Verneuil-l'Étang station in the 1940s. In the middle right, you can see the Verneuil-l'Étang tramway station in Melun, the junction that connects it to the main line, and the tramway tracks that are still present, which run behind the station to the right before turning left and then crossing over the main line via a bridge.

At the first session on 16 April 1949, the decommissioning of the Verneuil-to-Melun line, along with the Meaux-to-Saint-Mard, Melun-to-Barbizon-and-Milly, and La Ferté-sous-Jouarre-to-Montmirail lines, was considered less of a priority than the Saint-Mard-to-Dammartin, Beton-Bazoches-to-Sablonnières, and Jouy-le-Châtel-to-Marles-en-Brie lines because, according to the inquiry, it was not yet possible to conclude on the permanent abandonment of rail operations, and its fate would be decided after the priority lines.

However, during the second session on 6 January 1950, the opinion was not as favorable. The departmental assembly considered it necessary to proceed with the removal of the tracks in the near future, as “any resumption of rail traffic is no longer envisaged.” It appeared desirable to eliminate the railway track located on the roadside shoulder and at roadway crossings, as its existence constituted a “serious hindrance” to the completion of certain roadworks intended to improve road traffic. Moreover, from a financial perspective, the sale of the track material to be removed represented a significant source of revenue for Seine-et-Marne.

Noting that road transportation had returned to normal, it was decided to close the entire network, including the Verneuil tramway. The official closure of the entire network took effect on 1 July 1950. At that time, the department proposed the decommissioning of the line, which had become unnecessary. The removal of the tracks was carried out under the supervision of Ponts et Chaussées. The tracks were maintained until their decommissioning, which was confirmed on 21 March 1951. The line was dismantled entirely in the same year to allow for the widening of the national road.

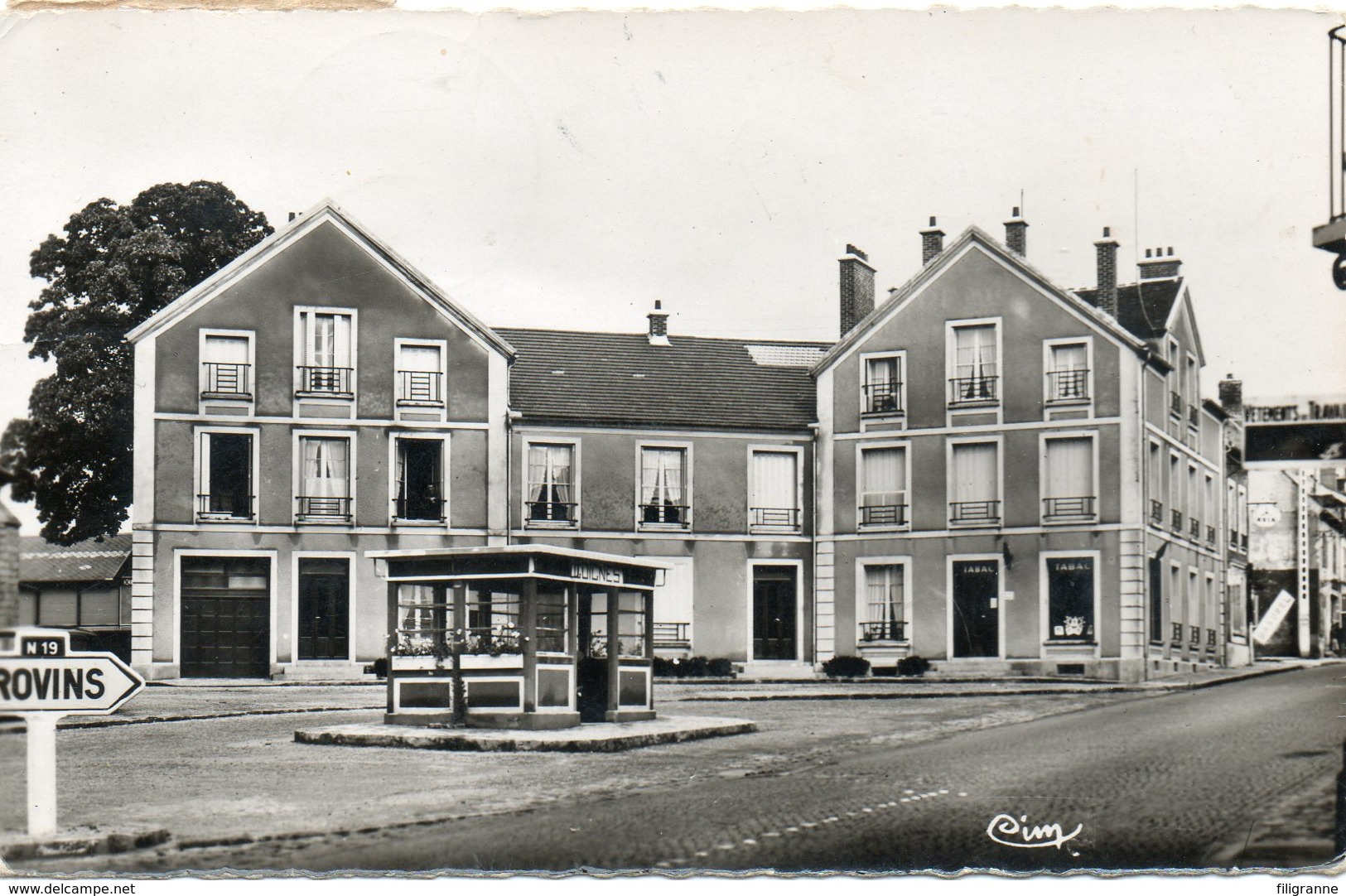
Guignes-Hôtel de Ville bus station, created following the closure of the line to passenger transport. Photo taken after 1940.

However, with the resolution of 10 May 1950, effective 1 July, the bus service from Melun to Verneuil continued to be operated by SE, with the department covering the deficit; however, SE lost the benefit of the cost-saving bonus it had previously received.

Locomotive No. 3701 Melun was requisitioned by the occupying authorities for the Organization Todt in 1943 and then sent to Finistère in September 1945. It was used until 1950 and scrapped the following year. Locomotive Verneuil No. 3702 was unusable due to the very poor condition of its boiler, which had encountered difficulties as early as 1940; it was dismantled in 1948, and its parts were used in 1952 to build an SNCF shunting tractor that was never completed. Locomotive No. 3703 Guignes, for its part, was permanently stopped in 1944 and scrapped in 1951. From 1933 to 1951, locomotives No. 3702 Verneuil, No. 3703 Guignes, and No. 3704 Nangis (used on the rest of the network and also scrapped in 1951) were “in service” at the Verneuil depot.

The Guignes-Villes station was demolished between 1956 and 1959 to create housing. The weighbridge located at Saint-Germain-Laxis was used by farm workers and destroyed in 1977. The station of the commune remained abandoned for a long time and was then sold in 1975 to be converted into a residence.

The Champdeuil-Crisenoy station was still visible in August 1987. It was demolished between 1987 and May 1989 during roadworks.

In 1953, the municipality of Melun requested priority for the acquisition of the disused Melun-Ville station and its land. However, the city would step aside if a public housing company (société HLM) requested the acquisition. Private individuals (Messrs. Blanc, Porta, and Keroul) also submitted a request. The commission negotiated with Melun, but the transfer of the land was not easy because inhabited barracks were located there, and the residents refused to leave. Eventually, the commission decided to sell the land to the Departmental Office of Public Housing (Office départemental d’HLM) at a price of 150 francs per square meter, but Messrs. Blanc and Porta obtained the portions that had been promised to them. At the session of 5 March 1953, the tramway rails, like those of the other lines, were partially sold to the Compagnie française de récupération industrielle. The tramway concession, set for 60 years, was scheduled to end on 6 May 1959.

The Verneuil tramway station was not destroyed all at once but gradually evolved and was integrated into the area of the Verneuil National Center for Bridges and Emergency Services.

== Route ==
=== Itinerary ===
Tram route applied to the current geographic map.

The line begins at Mail Gaillardon, at the “Melun-Ville” station. The track extends to the river port. A passing and maneuvering track ends in a dead end. A freight track branches off in the middle of this line; it serves a freight hall, which is also accessible by a transverse track and equipped with two turntables. This dead-end track serves all the traction facilities (the hydraulic crane and the engine shed, among others).

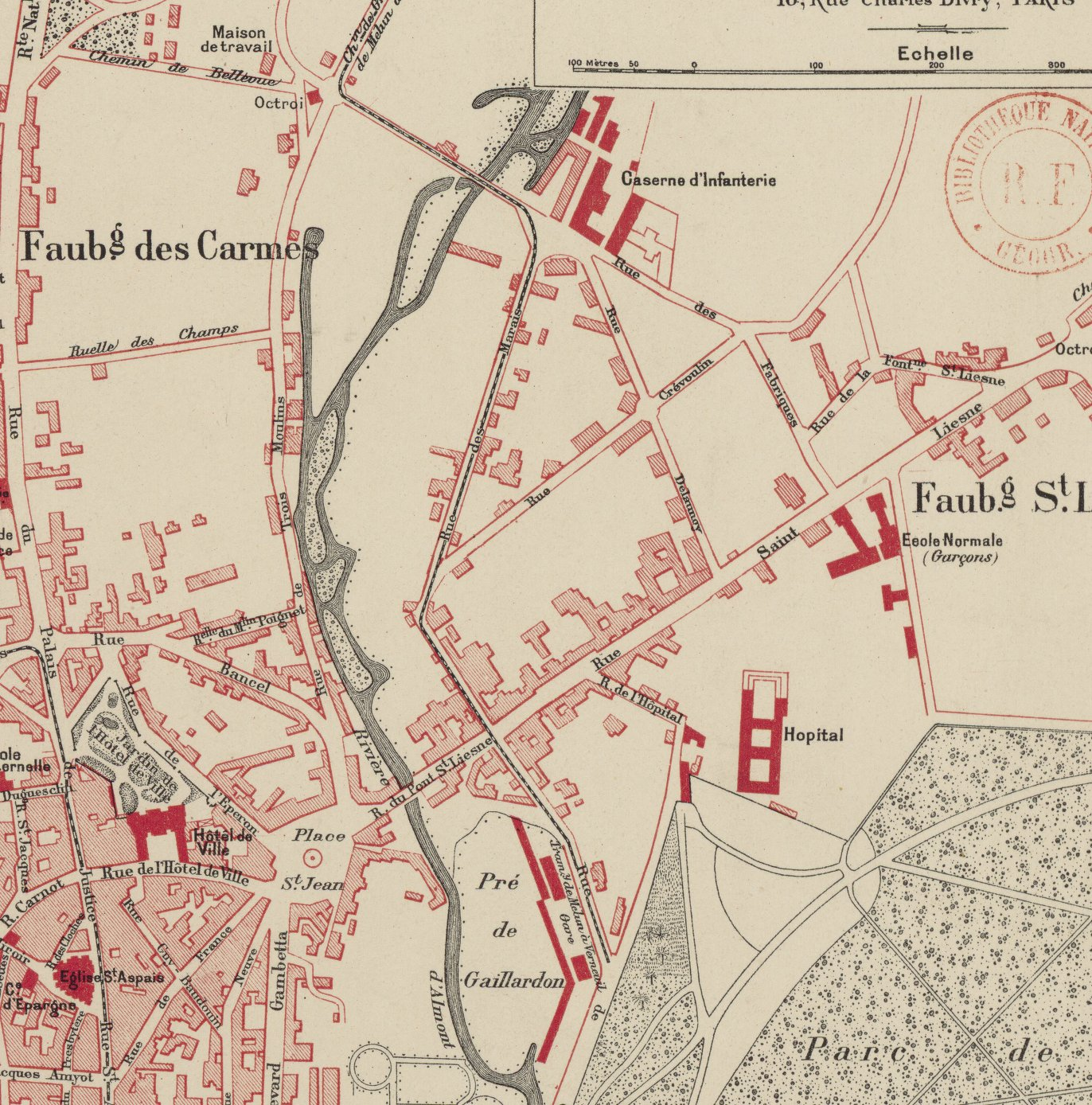
Map of the Melun section of the Verneuil tramway in 1904.

The tramway begins its journey at the Melun-Ville station in the Mail Gaillardon district at kilometer point 0.00. The locomotive passes through Rue des Marais, crosses Rue Saint-Liesne, then turns left, crosses the Almont River, and stays to the right on Rue des Trois-Moulins. Here is the first stop, called “Melun-Octroi” or simply “Octroi” (at PK 0.7). The stop is located at the Marais toll barrier. At this location, a municipal customs officer inspects baggage and, on the return trip, taxes products coming from the countryside. The tramway then leaves the town and heads toward the climb of Trois-Moulins, a small hamlet, where it stops (at PK 2.00) to take on water for the locomotive and allow the driver, the mechanic, and the train conductor to refresh themselves during hot periods.

The train then accelerates sharply to climb the difficult Rubelles hill. Once its speed has slowed upon arriving in the plain, the tramway stops at “Rubelles-Voisenon” (at PK 3.8), just before the road leading to the Château de Vaux-le-Vicomte. Continuing along National Road 36, the train reaches the “Saint-Germain-Laxis” station (at PK 6.2). Nearby, opposite the Route farm, is the municipal weighbridge. All loads, such as beets or wheat, are weighed there. The engines, meanwhile, take on water at the Pont des Regains.

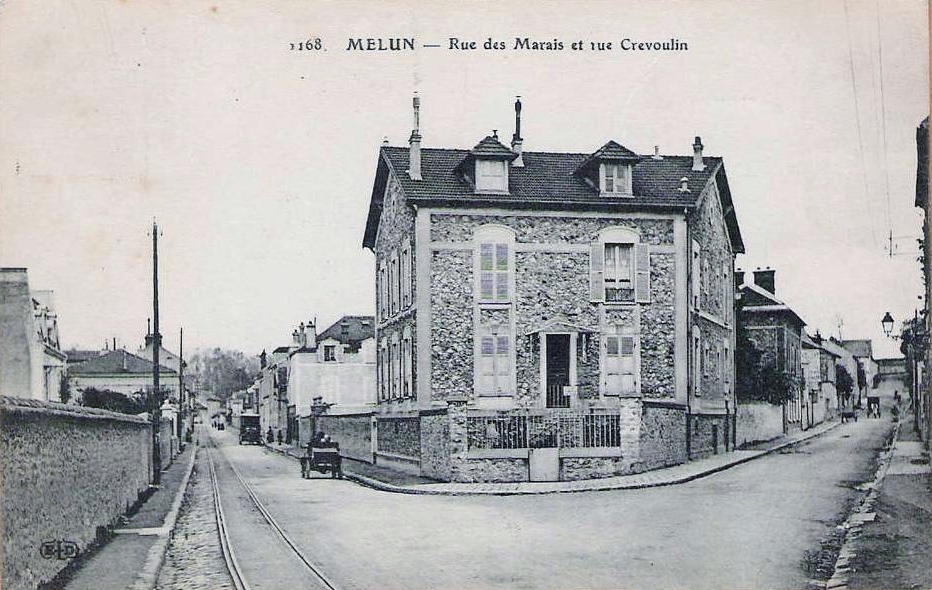
Verneuil tramway rails, at the intersection of rue Crevoulin and rue des Marais, before 1910.

After this sometimes lengthy stop, the train heads toward Crisenoy. The climb is challenging, and during difficult weather (snow, ice, heavy rain...), the tramway is sometimes unable to ascend and must make another attempt. After overcoming this section, the tram stops at “Les Bordes” (at PK 7.7), a halt in the middle of nature, serving the hamlet of the same name. Then, the locomotive arrives at the “Champdeuil-Crisenoy” station (at PK 9.6), halfway between the two communes of the same name, and then at the “Genouilly-Suscy” stop (at PK 10.8). The commune of Crisenoy, despite its small size, is served by these three stops due to the distance of its hamlets from the center.

After passing the hamlet of Vulaines, where it makes an optional stop, the tramway reaches the “Guignes-Sucrerie” station (at PK 14.3), which serves the sugar refinery of the commune, an important and developing local facility. The tramway then leaves National Road 36, crosses Departmental Road 99E, and bypasses the commune from the east on its own right-of-way. It stops in one of the most important towns on the line, “Guignes-Ville” (at PK 15.2). The tram then crosses National Road 19 and passes over the Ru d’Avon. It follows National Road 36 again, uses the road bridge to cross the main railway lines, and finishes its route at a station located north of the Verneuil-l’Étang railway station, serving the last commune on the line.

After passing the hamlet of Vulaines, where it makes an optional stop, the tramway reaches the “Guignes-Sucrerie” station (at PK 14.3), which serves the sugar refinery of the commune, a developing local facility. The tramway then leaves National Road 36, crosses Departmental Road 99E, and bypasses the commune from the east on its own right-of-way. It stops in one of the most important towns on the line, “Guignes-Ville” (at PK 15.2). The tram then crosses National Road 19 and passes over the Ru d’Avon. It follows National Road 36 again, uses the road bridge to cross the main railway lines, and finishes its route at a station located north of the Verneuil-l’Étang railway station, serving the last commune on the line.

=== Branch lines ===
One of the specific features of the line is that it has five branch lines between Melun and Verneuil, all reserved for freight traffic, especially for agricultural needs. The first branch is located at kilometer point (PK) 3.7 in Rubelles, and the second at PK 6.2 in Saint-Germain-Laxis. Both are used by the Guignes sugar refinery for transporting beets harvested in these two communes.

The third is located at PK 10.8, in Genouilly, for the needs of a farmer named Mr. Foy, on the territory of Crisenoy, like the fourth, located in the hamlet of Suscy, at PK 12.2, for the Société Civile de Suscy. The last is located at PK 14.3, at the Guignes-Sucrerie station, to serve the sugar refinery with the goods intended for it.

=== List of stations ===
PK	Stations	Municipalities served	Correspondences
18.4	Verneuil-l'Étang	Verneuil-l'Étang	Paris-Est–Mulhouse-Ville Paris-Bastille – Marles-en-Brie
15.2	Guignes-Ville	Guignes	
14.3	Guignes-Sucrerie	Guignes, Yèbles	
12.2	Vulaines-Suscy	Yèbles	
10.8	Genouilly-Suscy	Crisenoy	
9.6	Champdeuil – Crisenoy	Champdeuil, Crisenoy	
7.7	Les Bordes	Crisenoy	
6.2	Saint-Germain-Laxis	Saint-Germain-Laxis	
3.8	Rubelles – Voisenon	Rubelles, Voisenon, Maincy	
2.0	Les Trois-Moulins	Maincy, Rubelles, Melun	
0.7	Melun-Octroi	Melun	
0.0	Melun-Ville	Melun	Melun Tram (nearby)

== Rolling stock ==
=== Locomotives and draisine vehicles ===
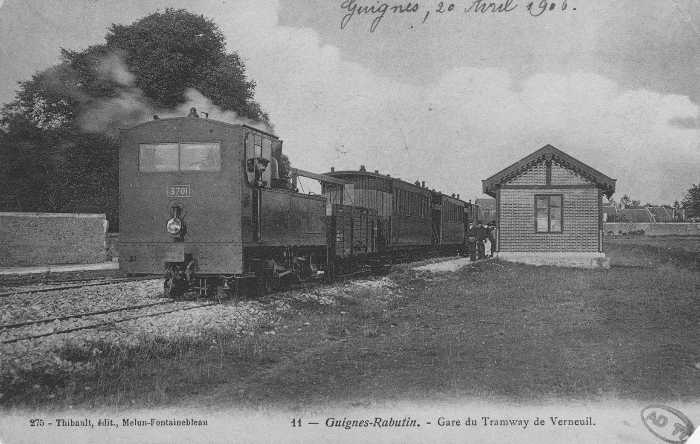
A mixed freight/passenger train at Guignes-Ville station before 1910. The locomotive is 3701 Melun.

Numerous machines were used for the construction of the line. The Cordier company had a 0-6-0T locomotive, No. 4, built at Couillet and coming from the Compagnie de chemins de fer départementaux, which was then transferred to Verneuil for the construction of the line. It also had a Corpet locomotive bearing a plaque “Cie des chemins de fer de l’Ouest à Rennes,” previously used for the construction of the Breton Network, and then used for the works, and finally, a third locomotive of unknown origin, which was only used as a backup for the previous one.

To save money, the department initially opted for 2-6-0 locomotives, used by the Côte-d’Or departmental railways. Due to the track layout along the roadside, it was planned that they would run with their chimneys at the rear to give the driver better visibility of the track and avoid collisions or entanglement with carts on the road. The controls were placed near the cab wall.

A call for tenders was sent to twelve companies, both French and foreign. Only the proposals from the Société Franco-Belge de Matériel de Chemin de Fer, Maison Veuve L. Corpet and L. Louvet, and Société Française de Constructions Mécaniques were deemed acceptable, with preference given to the latter, which was awarded the order. However, the company designed a different model than that of the Dijon network, notably in terms of increasing the grid surface, adopting the Belpaire firebox, finned tubes, moving the steam dome to the front of the cylindrical body, using direct-load safety valves, preferring the Walschaerts valve gear over Stephenson’s, the suspension system for the axles, and modifying the cab with a front wall featuring a large opening protected by two sliding windows.

These locomotives were delivered with cabs, water tanks painted in light Prussian green with red lining, boilers in Siam black, front and rear buffer beams in vermilion, and yellow lettering. The builder’s plates, ownership plates, and the plates bearing names and numbers were made of bronze.

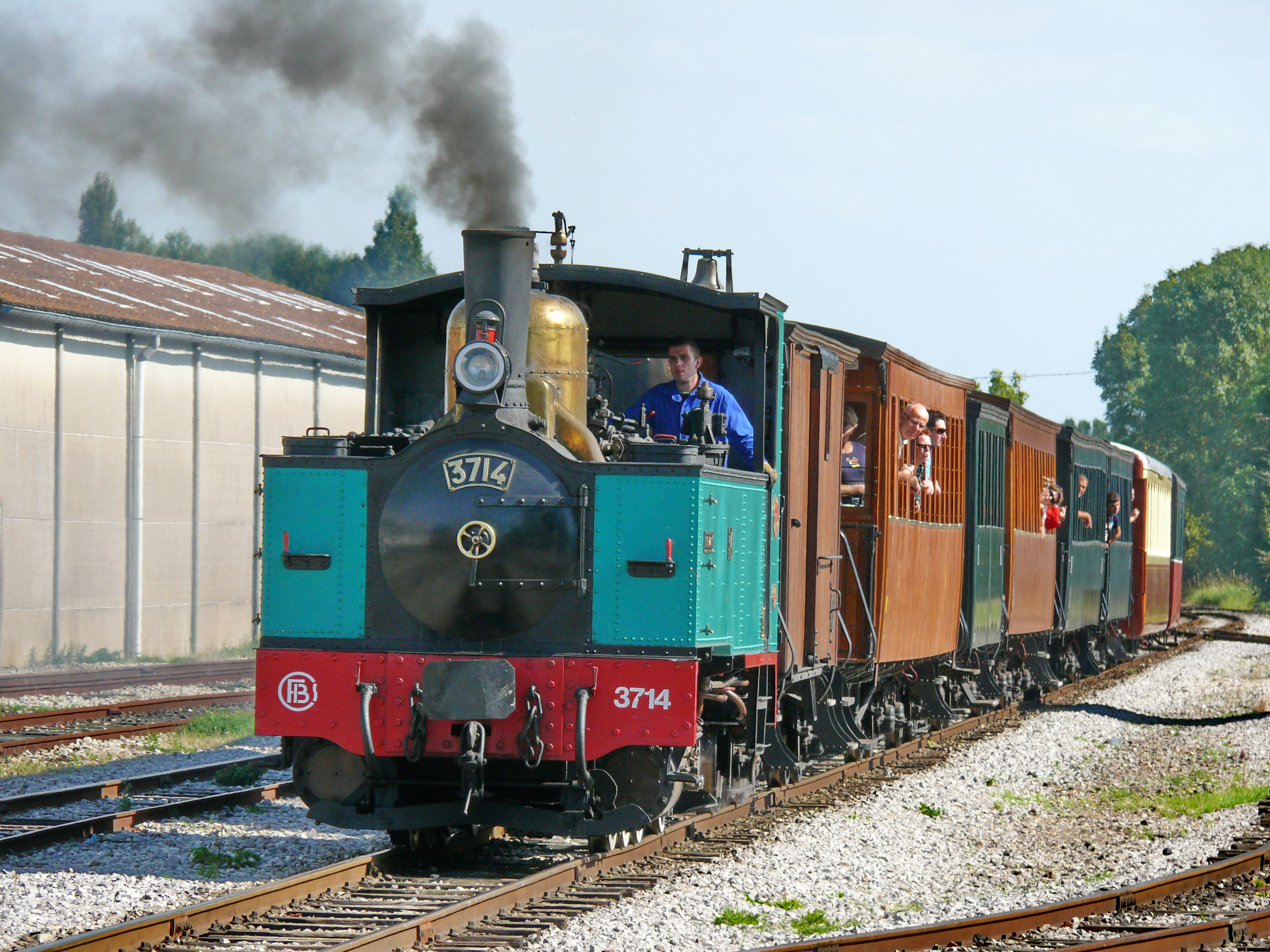
Secondary train comparable to that operated for the line.

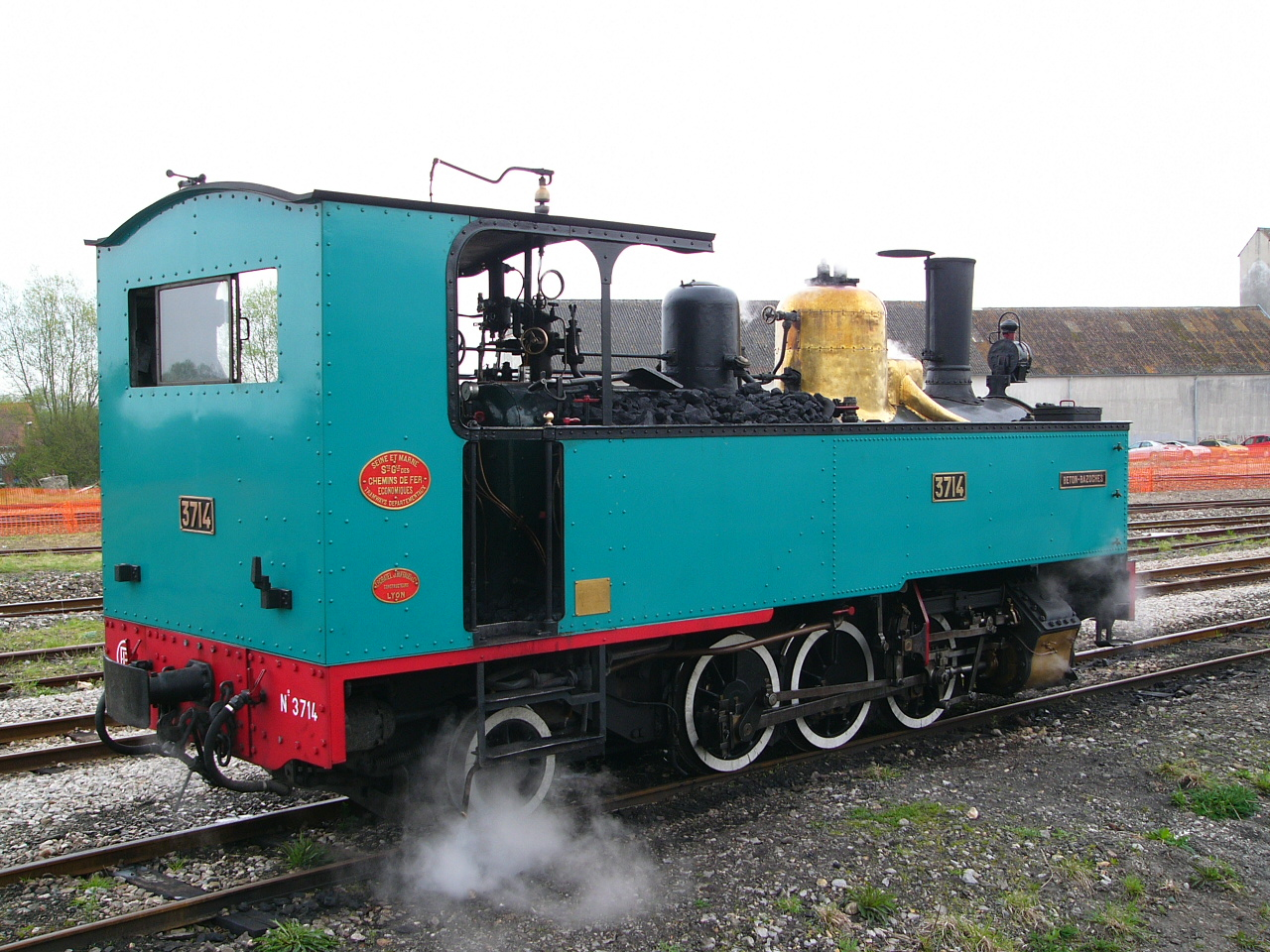
Buffaud and Robatel locomotive no. 3714, formerly used on the Seine-et-Marne network, preserved by the CFBS, similar to the locomotives on the line.

The locomotives used were 0-6-2T engines built in 1900 by Cail and designed to run with their cab at the front, to improve the driver’s visibility and avoid accidents. They were named after the towns crossed by the tramway (3701: Melun, 3702: Verneuil, 3703: Guignes). They had three driving axles, six driving wheels, and a carrying axle located beneath the cab.

There is still a similar locomotive, built to the same model by the Buffaud & Robatel company, which operates on the Baie de Somme railway network. In 1903, the line owned, in addition to the three locomotives, eight passenger coaches, two baggage vans, four flat wagons, eight open wagons, four covered wagons, and an additional rescue wagon.

Passenger service was provided by a short train of one to three coaches, depending on the number of passengers, as well as a baggage van usually packed with a large number of parcels and bicycles. In winter, due to the darkness, the train was equipped with small oil lamps.

Locomotive 3701 Melun underwent a boiler swap with 3705 Sablonnières in September 1911. As for locomotive 3703 Guignes, its boiler was exchanged with that of 3709 Rozoy in 1929, before being swapped back again in 1939.

Due to delays in delivery between 1901 and 1902, the line used leased locomotives, three Mallet engines, numbered 4501 Orcenais, 4502 Tortezais, and 4503 Saint Jeanvrin. They arrived in early April 1901 and underwent the required brake test runs. The tests were successful for the first two, which were authorized to operate on 2 May 1901, while the third, whose tests showed insufficient braking, had to wait until 5 September after numerous improvements to enter service.

In addition, SE owned three draisines: No. 116 in 1926, coming from Allier; No. 647 in 1933, coming from Lourches-Cambrai; and No. 708 in 1934, coming from the Billard workshops. Starting in 1934, they were used for postal service across the entire network.

=== Coaches and vans ===
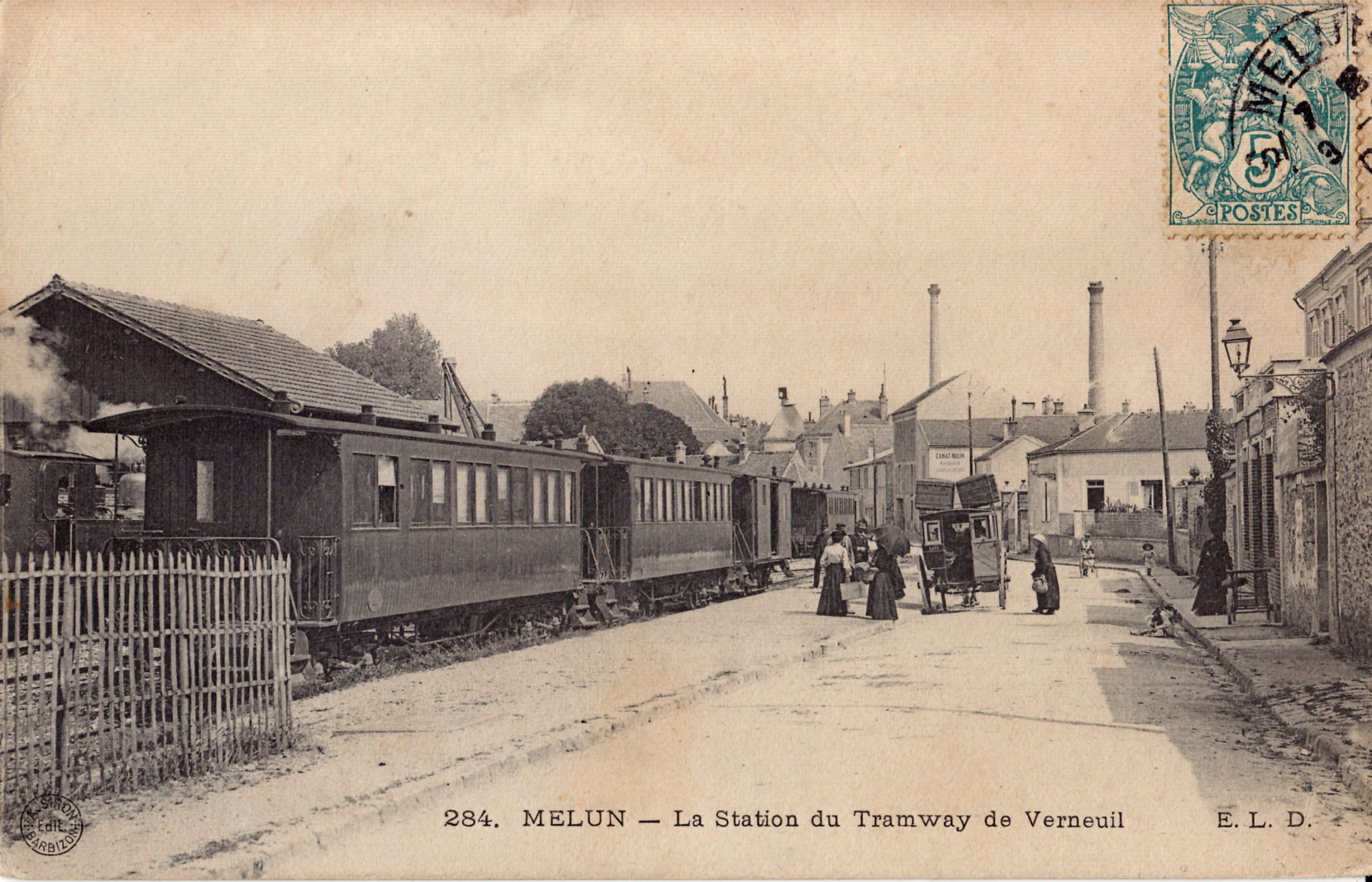
Melun-Ville station, terminus of the Tramway, before 1906, with two cars and a van parked at the station.

According to the retrocession agreement of 28 April 1899, the “High Speed” rolling stock planned for operation consisted of eight coaches and two baggage vans. After reviewing the plan, SE proposed replacing the 24-seat coaches mounted on two axles with bogie coaches holding 36 seats. The department then gave its approval in principle, and SE proposed for the line so-called “first type” coaches (Note: The "second type" carriages, used on the rest of the network along with the "first type," had twelve first-class seats and twenty-four second-class seats.) with six first-class seats and thirty second-class seats, as well as two “third type” coaches with eighteen first-class seats and eighteen second-class seats as additional stock.

In December 1899, SE issued a call for tenders to manufacturers, and the proposals from “Ateliers de construction du Nord de la France” (ANF) proved the most advantageous; a contract was signed on 21 February 1900.

The coaches had identical frames. A gangway door was arranged at the end of each platform. The compartment benches were placed transversely back-to-back on either side of the aisle, with two seats on one side and one on the other.

The vans had two small end platforms and a small postal compartment located in one corner of the body, with an access door opening onto one of the platforms. The baggage compartment had a door on each platform and two rolling shutters on either side of the middle wall.

The Melun–Verneuil line received six “first type” coaches numbered 101 to 106, the 3rd type coaches 301 and 302, as well as the postal baggage vans 801 and 802.

=== Freight wagons ===
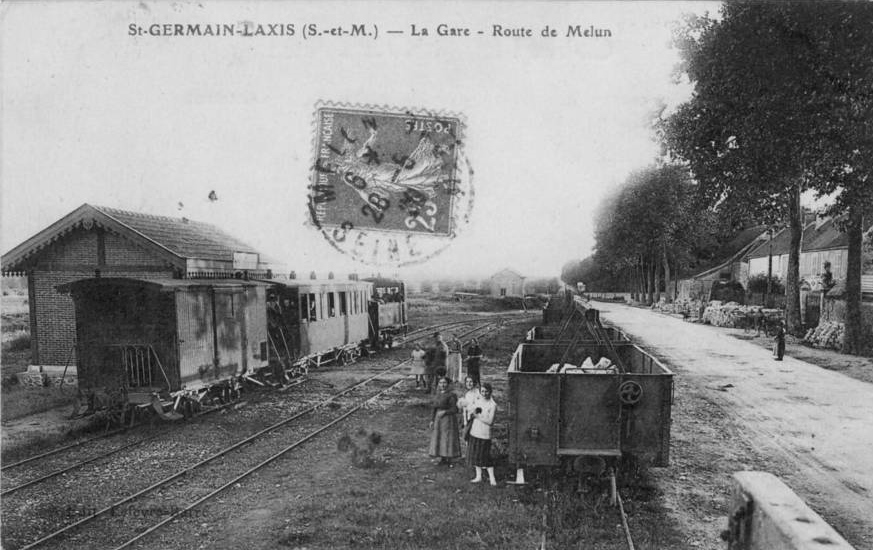
Saint-Germain-Laxis station in the early 1920s with a passenger train and gondola wagons.

Initially, the Department of Roads and Bridges recommended 16 freight wagons for the tramway. After receiving the department’s approval, the company also chose ANF workshops for the construction of the wagons, and the contract was signed on 21 February 1900.

The covered wagons were equipped with four sliding shutters on either side of a central rolling door on each side wall. The open wagons had a double door on each side wall and a ridge bar. The flat wagons had drop sides and a removable extension. Each wagon had a screw brake operated by a handwheel located at one end of the vehicle.

The line received covered wagons numbered 2001 to 2005, open wagons numbered 4001 to 4008, and flat wagons numbered 6001 to 6004. Over time, this number increased several times due to the rising traffic from the Guignes sugar refinery, including 12 open wagons delivered on 11 January 1911 and registered Uf 4064 to Uf 4075.

The Guignes sugar refinery was authorized, on 28 September 1912, to put into service 8 open wagons numbered 21 to 28. During the 1932 beet campaign, the refinery rented from Locamat 10 open wagons numbered 15, 18, 28, 29, 41, 43, 44, 64, 462, and 464; and in 1941, it obtained from the Allier department five open wagons from decommissioned lines, numbered U 3124, U 3219, U 3148, Uf 4136, and Uf 4502.

== Infrastructure ==
=== Tracks ===
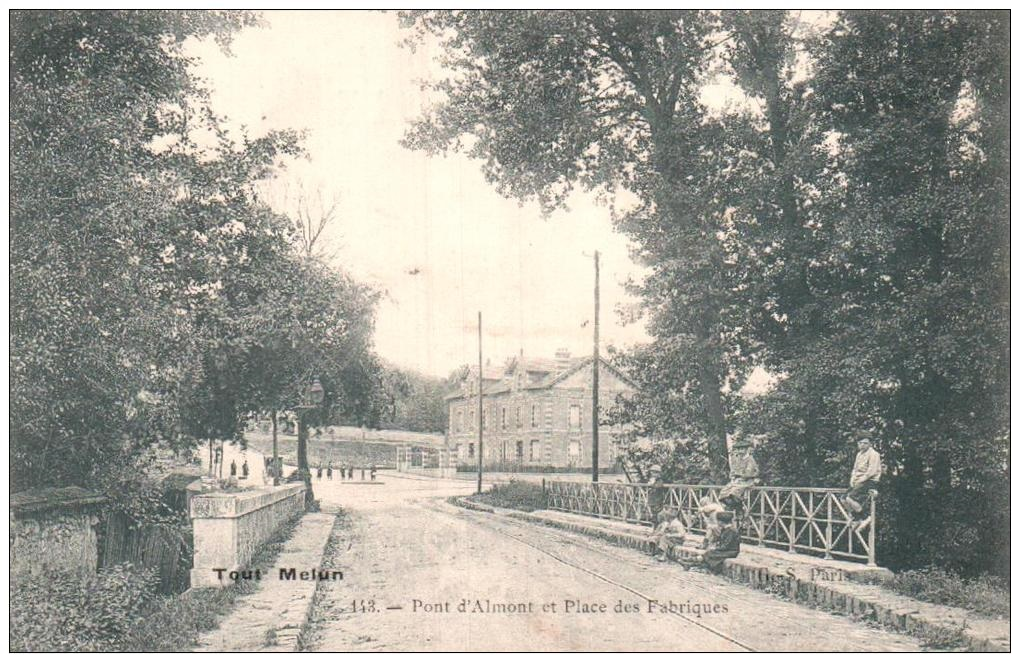
Rue des Marais in Melun; we can see the “submerged” tramway rails, before 1908.

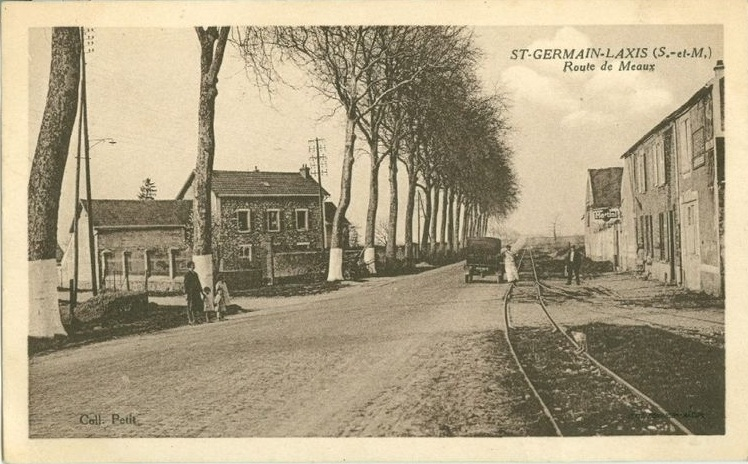
Road from Meaux to Saint-Germain-Laxis towards Crisenoy, at the beginning of the 20th century. The tramway tracks can be seen.

The rails used on the line were Vignole steel rails weighing up to 20 kg per meter, in 8-meter-long bars resting on ten oak sleepers, each 1.70 meters in length, fastened with lag screws. In sections equipped with a guard rail, the maximum total weight reached 30 kg per meter. The rail used was notable for its simple geometry. This symmetrical, well-balanced profile made it very easy to roll and featured a widened base that ensured effective fastening to the sleepers.

In the section through Melun, asymmetrical 18 kg/m rails were used (called "Heude track"). The ballast, 0.35 meters thick, consisted of pebbles and crushed stones sourced from nearby quarries and the Seine.

Laid along road shoulders, the line was officially classified as a tramway under the regulations of the time, since part of its route ran on public roads. The track infrastructure resembled that of a tramway, with lighter rails around 15 kg/m (compared to 60 kg/m on main lines); the ballast was less voluminous, and the sleepers measured between 1.8 and 2 meters (as opposed to 2.70 meters on mainline railways). As with traditional tramways, signals were absent, operation was conducted by line-of-sight, and speed was reduced.

=== Signaling and line management ===
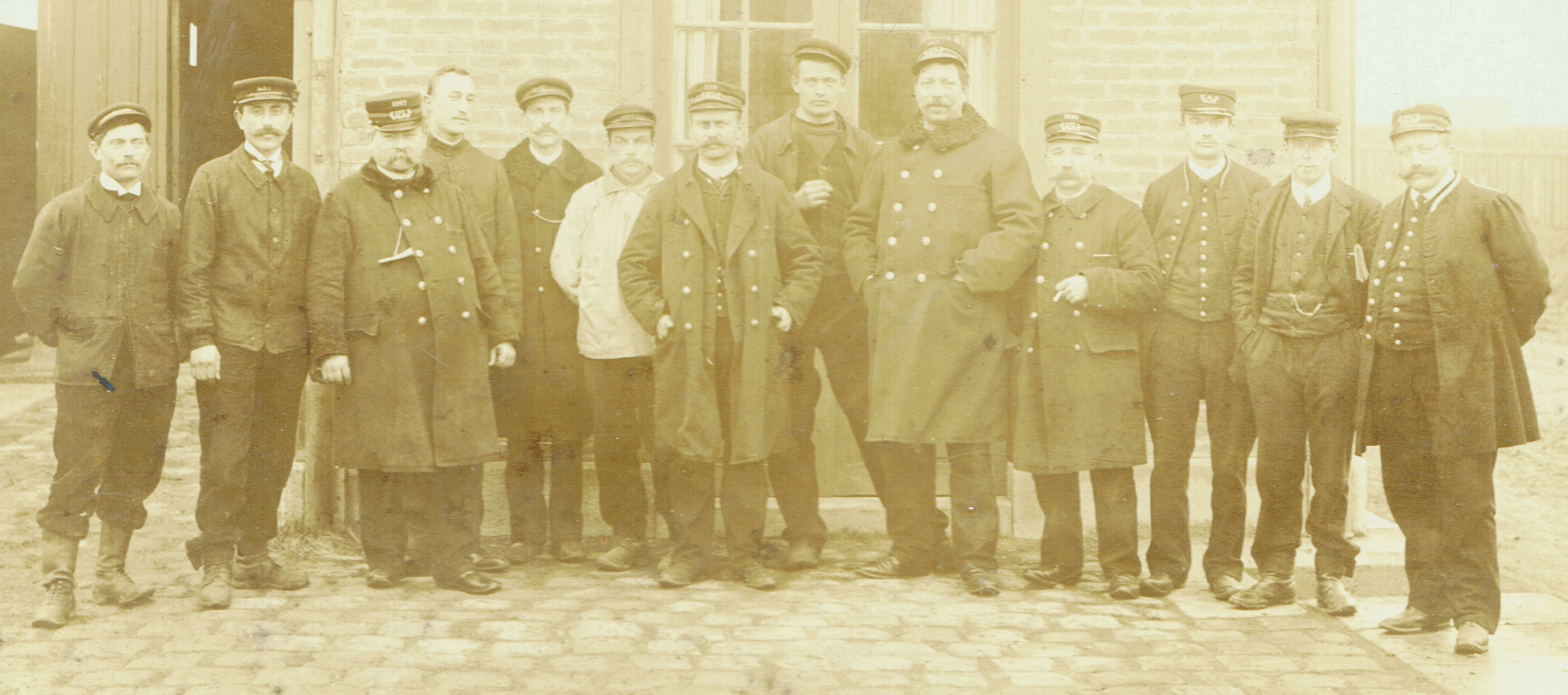
Verneuil tramway employees around 1910–1920.

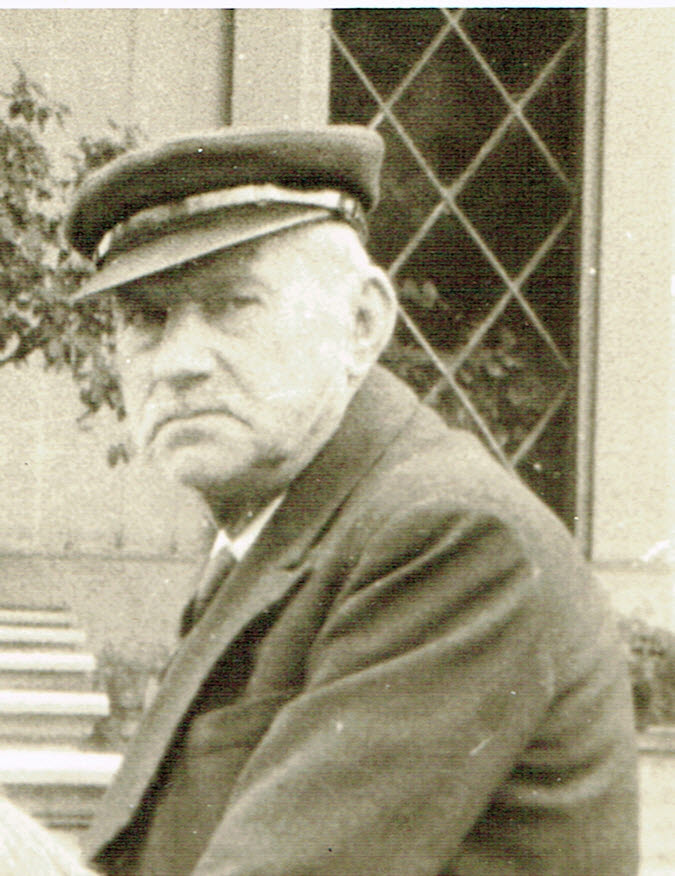
Prudent Bertrand, chef de gare de la ligne.

In addition to train crews, two employees at each station regulated traffic and checked passengers. In 1917, most employees earned a salary of 1,200 francs; a few reached 1,500 francs, and very few received 1,800 francs. These wages, deemed too low by the General Council, led to the introduction of “cost-of-living allowances” that same year.

Rubelles station, located at the corner of RN 36 and the road from Maincy to Voisenon, had a high platform used to load or unload animals, materials, seeds, barrels, and other goods awaiting transport. Certain wagons were reserved for the stone industry from the Maincy quarries, and for sugar beets headed to the Guignes refinery.

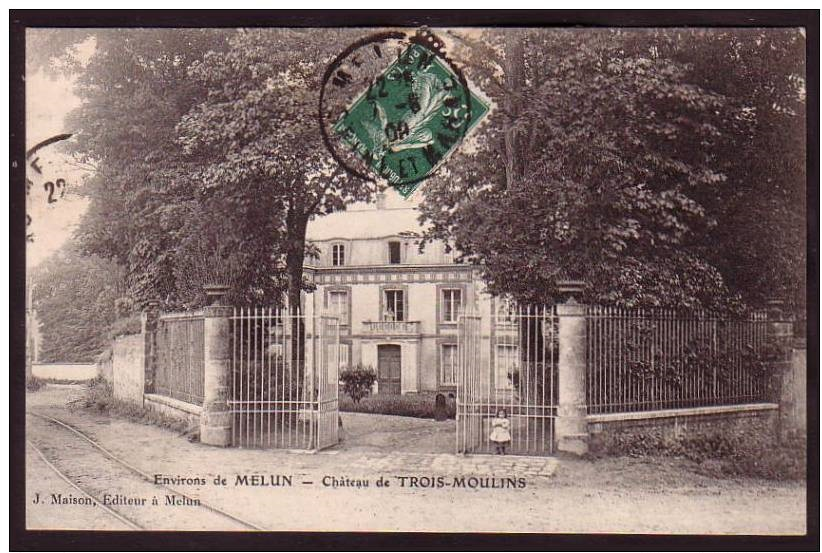
Château des Trois-Moulins in Melun. To the side, the Verneuil tramway track at the beginning of the 20th century.

A local headquarters was based in Melun, while the sub-inspector was in Verneuil-l’Étang. The SE’s local headquarters for the network was located at 45 Rue de Dammarie in Melun, where the operating manager resided. In addition to one inspector in charge of the Bray–Jouy section and another for Jouy–Sablonnières and Marles–Jouy, a sub-inspector managed the Melun–Verneuil line. This changed in 1923, when the position was eliminated and the line was attached to the Bray inspector. Finally, by 1933, only one inspector remained for the entire network, and therefore for the Verneuil line as well. This inspector resided in Jouy until 1942, then in Nangis. From 1944 onward, the Verneuil tram was managed by the operating manager, like the rest of the network. Three locomotives handled the three daily round trips (morning, midday, and evening), with each train typically consisting of three cars. A “refreshment stop” was made in summer at the Trois-Moulins station for the driver, fireman, and conductor.

Signaling consisted of fixed white discs bordered in yellow, requiring a slowdown about 100 meters before entering a station. Train movements were regulated according to the timetable booklet, which set a maximum speed of 20 km/h for mixed trains and 14 km/h for freight and service trains.

The Verneuil–Melun line was the only one in the network not equipped with a telephone connection; the trains operated as shuttles and no passing was possible. However, starting in 1914, with various improvements made to the tracks at Melun-Ville, Champdeuil–Crisenoy, and Saint-Germain-Laxis during the first years of operation, crossings were introduced at those stations. The trains were required to stop for two to three minutes to allow the crossing.

=== Accidents on the line ===
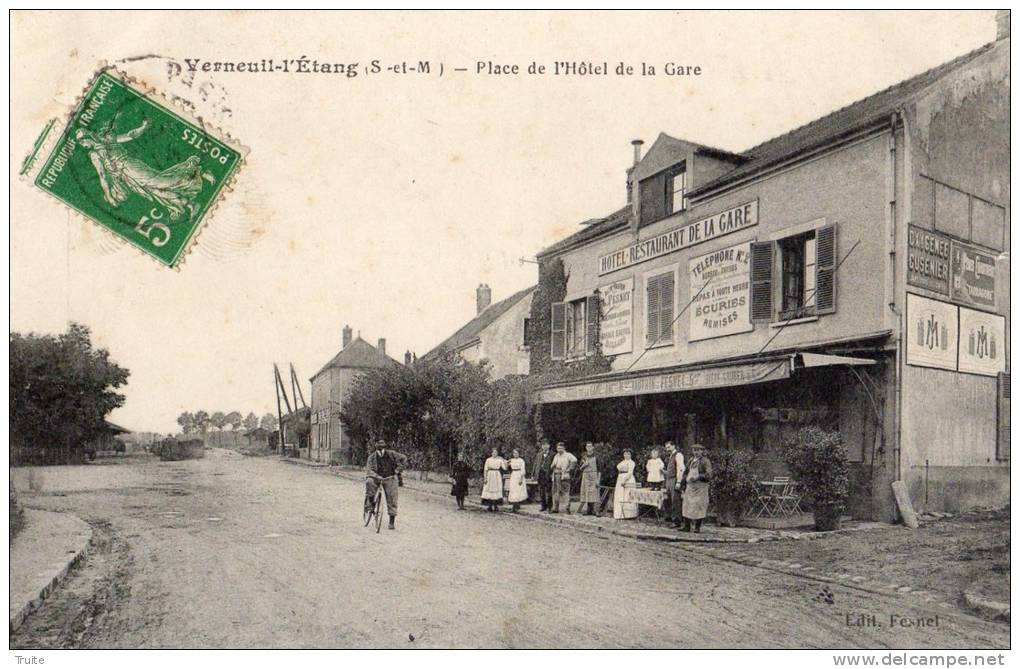
Café at the Verneuil-l'Étang main line station with the Verneuil tramway station buildings in the background.

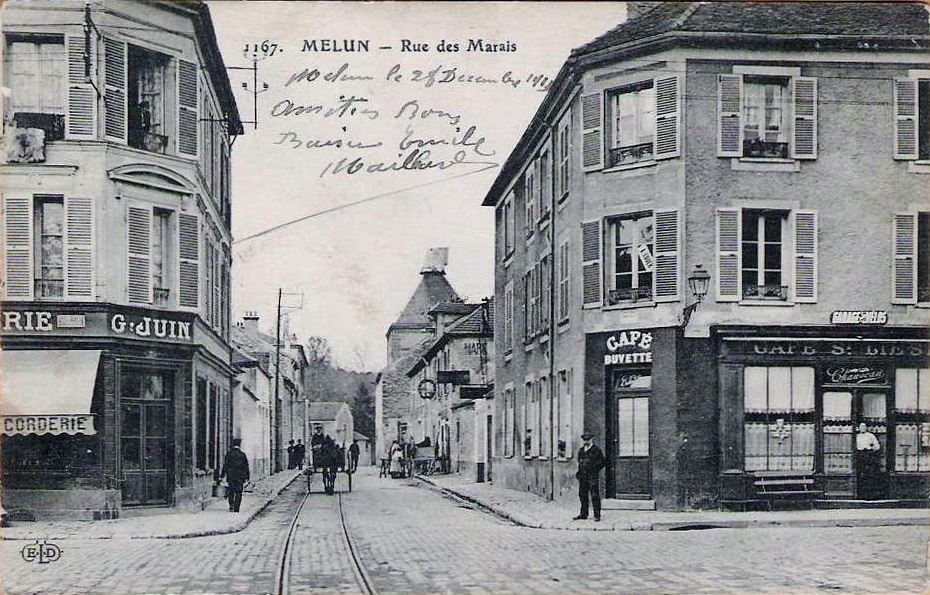
Verneuil tramway rails, rue des Marais (currently rue Camille Flammarion) at the intersection of rue Saint-Liesne.

The line was prone to accidents, as most of its tracks ran along the RN 36. However, accidents were rare, thanks to the caution exercised by staff and local residents, who from the line’s opening took care to secure their horse-drawn carriages when trains passed.

One of the few accidents that left a lasting impression occurred during World War I, near Rue des Marais in Melun. At dusk, a train derailed after a frightened horse bolted and threw itself under a locomotive. Apart from the death of the animal, there were no injuries and little damage; however, it took all night to remove the horse, which had been torn apart by the engine, and to rerail the locomotive after repairing the track. The train was not put back into service until the next day.

Another accident occurred in July 1929 at the intersection with the road from Paris to Belfort, near Guignes: a car was struck at an angle by one of the line’s locomotives. The four occupants of the vehicle were severely injured and taken to Melun hospital; one woman died upon arrival.

=== Timetables and service ===
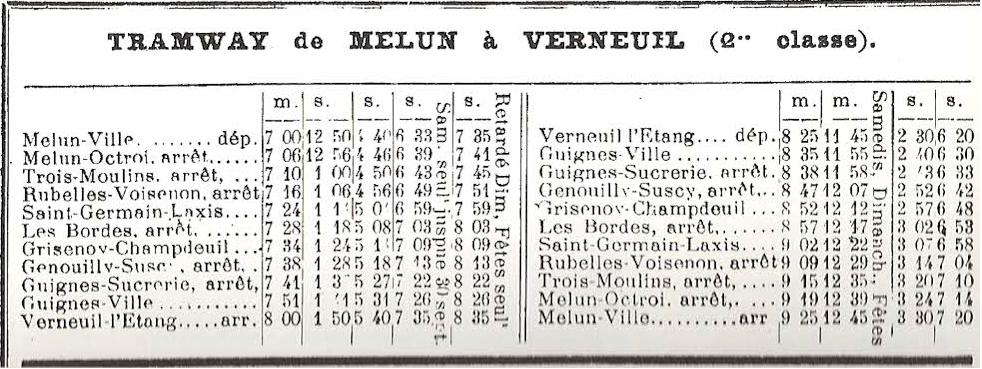
Timetable of the line in 1913.

Timetable sheets were prepared to be posted in the stations along the line to inform passengers of train departure and arrival times.

According to a certain André Bertrand, (Note: André Bertrand (Schoolteacher, 1905–1982), born in Melun, was the son of Prudent Bertrand (1874–1959), who worked for the tramway starting in 1902. He later became the line supervisor based at the Melun station. He ended his career with the tramway at the closure of the line. Prudent Bertrand was certainly an important figure in the tramway's history.) the line was initially served by two round trips per day, with an additional train during the fine season, on holidays, and on market days, so that “country folk could do their shopping in town.” However, from the very start of the line’s operation, three round trips were scheduled, and by 1905, an additional round trip was added on Saturdays and Sundays.

According to the 1913 report, the General Council noted that the fourth train generated very little revenue due to low ridership. For example, during April 1913, this additional service brought in only 27.55 francs. The fourth train made its final runs in 1914, just before the service was reduced to two daily round trips due to the war; it was never reinstated afterward.

A fifth train was introduced for the Melun market on January 1, 1910, following a resolution of September 29, 1909. It was discontinued on May 1, 1911, as it was considered expensive for the department.

Due to the lack of telephone connections and the significant risk of accidents, the timetables indicated that departure and arrival times could not be guaranteed if delays occurred because of incidents along the route.

The travel time evolved over the years. In April 1901, the inaugural trip took 1 hour and 5 minutes. After May 1901, the journey required 1 hour and 10 minutes; in 1913, the time was slightly reduced to just 1 hour between the two termini.

In 1901, departures from Melun were at 6:45 a.m., 12:45 p.m., and 4:29 p.m.; in the opposite direction, departures from Verneuil were at 8:30 a.m., 2:30 p.m., and 6:10 p.m. In 1913, departures from Melun were at 7:00 a.m., 12:50 p.m., 4:40 p.m., as well as 6:33 p.m. on Saturdays and 7:35 p.m. on Sundays and holidays; in the opposite direction, departures from Verneuil were at 8:25 a.m., 2:30 p.m., and 6:20 p.m., as well as 11:45 a.m. on Saturdays, Sundays, and holidays. (Note: See illustration: La fiche horaire de la ligne en 1913 (The line timetable in 1913).) In 1918, departures from Melun were at 8:30 a.m. and 3:45 p.m.; in the opposite direction, departures from Verneuil were at 10:50 a.m. and 6:15 p.m. In 1925, departures from Melun were at 6:05 a.m., 9:30 a.m., and 4:05 p.m.; in the opposite direction, departures from Verneuil were at 8:22 a.m., 10:50 a.m., and 6:25 p.m. By 1937, the Verneuil–Melun bus service offered a denser schedule than the tramway, with departures from Melun station in the morning at 7:40 a.m., 11:10 a.m., and 1:10 p.m.

On June 1, 1918, the two tramway round trips stopped only at stations and not at halts.

=== Passenger and freight services ===
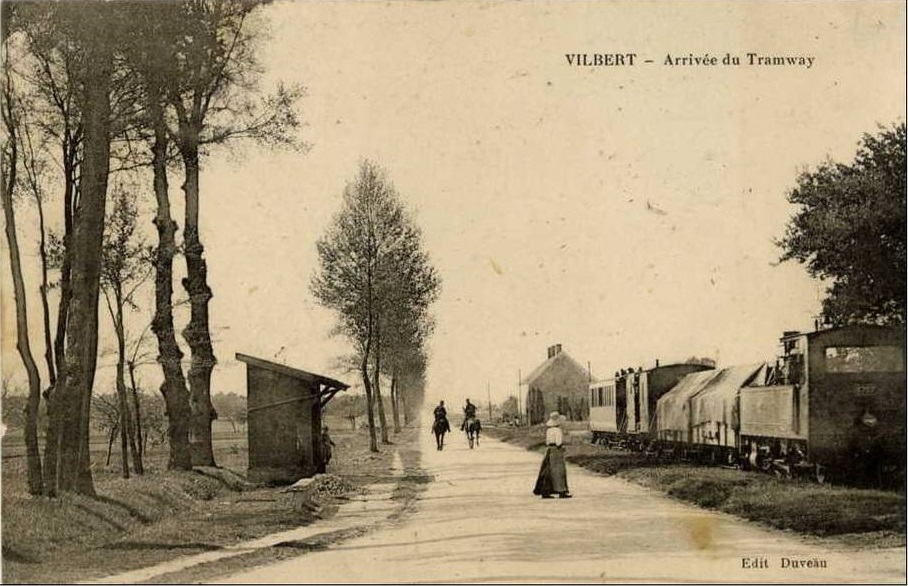
Vilbert tram stop from Marles-en-Brie to Jouy-le-Châtel, part of the same network. The shelter is the archetypal stop on the network. The stop has a shape similar to those at Melun-Octroi or Les Bordes.

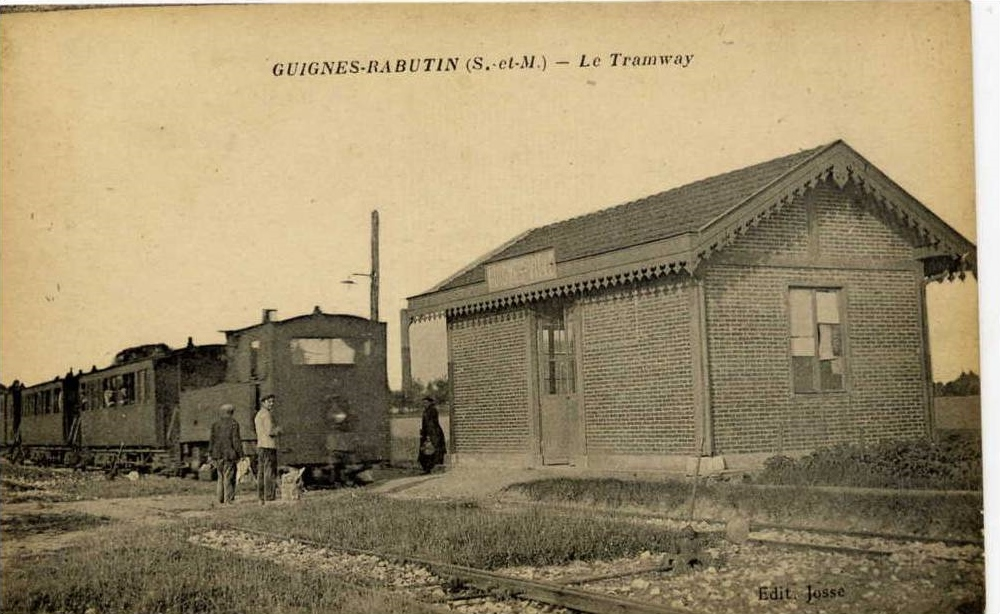
Guignes train station, tram stop, at the beginning of the 20th century.

The stops “Verneuil,” “Guignes-Ville,” “Champdeuil–Crisenoy,” “Saint-Germain-Laxis,” and “Melun-Ville” were full stations, while the stops “Melun-Octroi,” “Les Trois-Moulins,” “Rubelles-Voisenon,” “Les Bordes,” “Genouilly-Suscy,” and “Guignes-Sucrerie” were merely halts.

There was also a conditional stop called “Vulaines-Suscy,” which was not marked and where the tram stopped only on request. However, the stop was not consistently served; while the tram stopped at Vulaines in 1904, 1914, and 1925, it did not in 1913.

The line was designed to be operated economically. It had simple transit stations, consisting of a shelter with a waiting room and an unstaffed office. The six halts were marked by simple posts displaying basic information. Station staff, mostly women, were present only during train stops. Only the stations at Melun and Verneuil-l’Étang had permanent staff.

In the stations, in addition to the main track, there is a siding, known as the "freight track," consisting of one or even two dead-end tracks, depending on the importance of the town. These very simple facilities were expanded and improved over the years.

At the start of operations, freight traffic was quite varied but not very significant. It consisted of milling wheat, straw and fodder, barrels of wine, building materials, coal, lime stones from Maincy, as well as sugar beets for the Guignes sugar factory. The tramway also transported livestock, such as horses and cattle.

The transport of sugar beets was particularly significant during the autumn; they were loaded all along the line, even in Melun, where the loaded trains coming from the plains went to the Pré Gaillardon station.

== Remains and preserved equipment ==
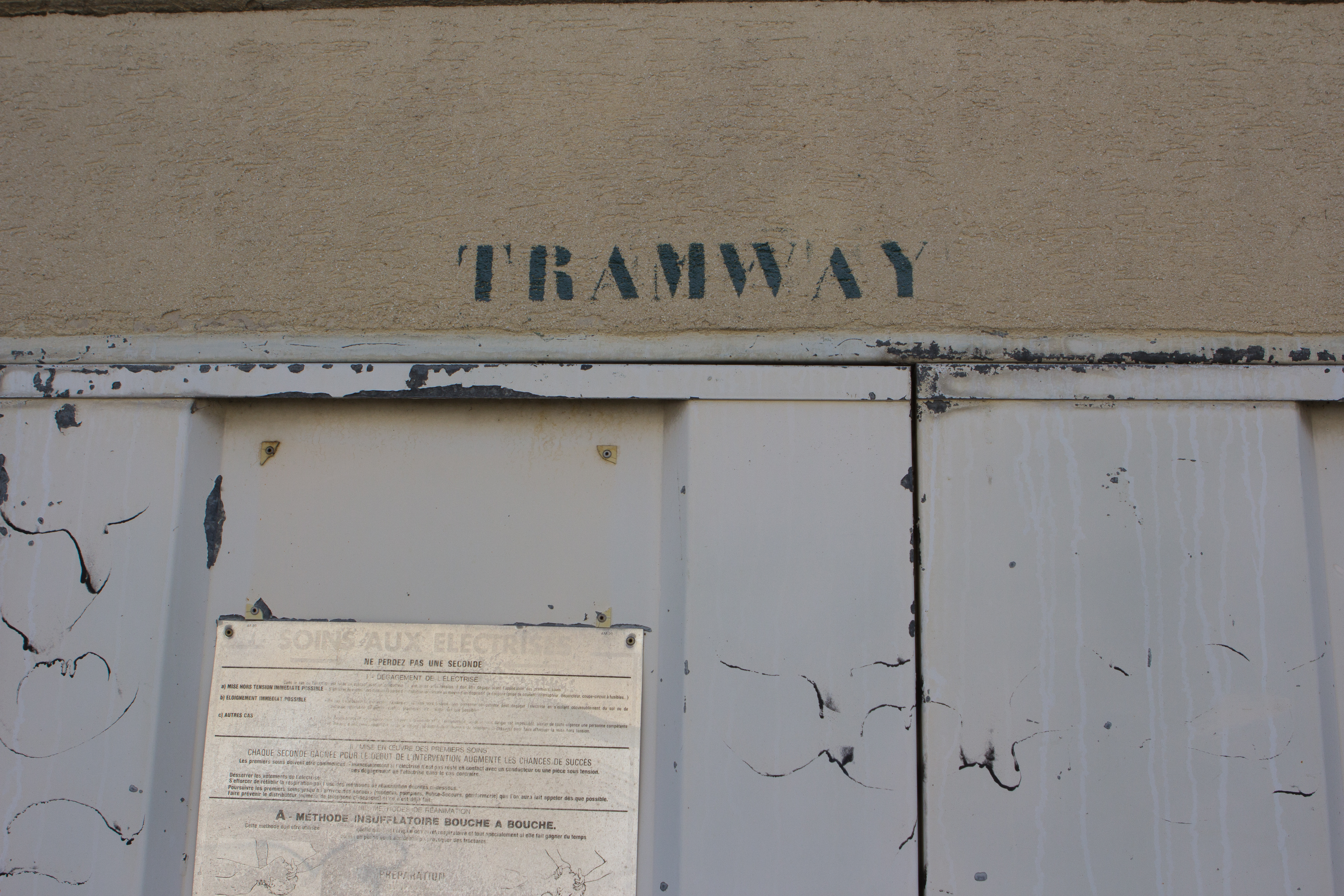
Mention of the tramway on an EDF post near the Guignes-Ville station.

Article by André Bertrand in La République de Seine-et-Marne published January 4, 1982.

No physical traces of the tramway remain. However, its route can still be easily imagined, as it almost entirely followed the RN 36 between Guignes and Rubelles, as it was numbered at that time. Except for the Saint-Germain-Laxis station, which now houses a residence, all the other stations have been demolished.

A "TRAMWAY" inscription is found on an EDF post next to the site of the former Guignes-Ville station. Also remaining are the standard-gauge tracks that connected the Verneuil tramway station to the freight station of Verneuil’s mainline trains. The bus station at Mail Gaillardon, located closer to the city center than the Melun-Ville station, is still in use. None of the other former tramway stops are served by buses, which now favor more urbanized areas.

The company Transdev Darche Gros had taken over the route in its entirety with lines 01 and 37, which, in 2023, following the opening of the market to competition, became part of the Brie and 2 Morin networks and the Pays Briard network, respectively, operated by other companies. The company was created in 1934, at the time of the tramway’s closure to passenger services. The "Verneuil-l'Étang – Guignes – Melun" section is the main route of line 01 (less frequently of line 37). The "Crisenoy–Champdeuil – Voisenon – Maincy – Melun" section is one of the main routes of line 37 (less frequently of line 01).

== Line in culture ==
The tramway is the main setting of a novel by Paul Darcy, Du sang sur les rails (Blood on the Rails), published in 1937, in which the story begins with the discovery of a corpse on the little train’s track. The line was still being served by trains hauled by locomotives. The entire story revolves around the tramway. In the book, the victim, supposedly killed by being run over by the train, had been stabbed beforehand. The book highlights that the line had stopped passenger traffic a few years earlier and had been replaced by buses, like many secondary railways of the time: “A line still traversed by wheezing locomotives, clattering like a child’s toy nearly falling apart.”

On January 4, 1982, an article by André Bertrand in the local newspaper La République de Seine-et-Marne, in the column "Souvenir du temps passé" (Memory of the Past), paid tribute to the Verneuil line. It described “a small narrow-gauge railway line that could not have lasted more than thirty years,” and concluded: “Today, all that has fallen into oblivion.”

== Photo gallery ==
=== Modern photographs ===
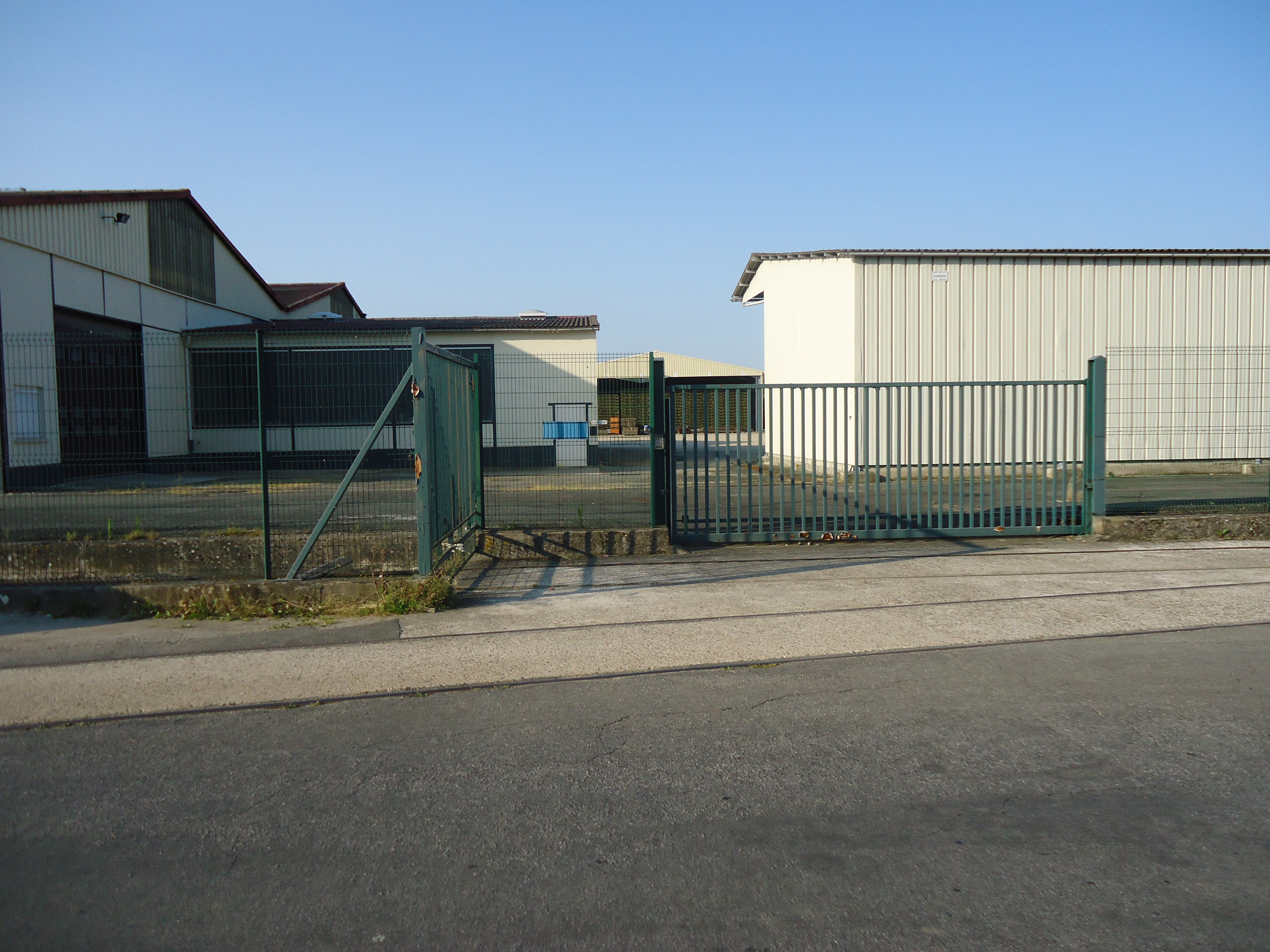
Location of the former Verneuil tramway terminus, with the freight tracks in the middle. The white building is the result of the evolution of the old railway building, which has changed significantly over the years.

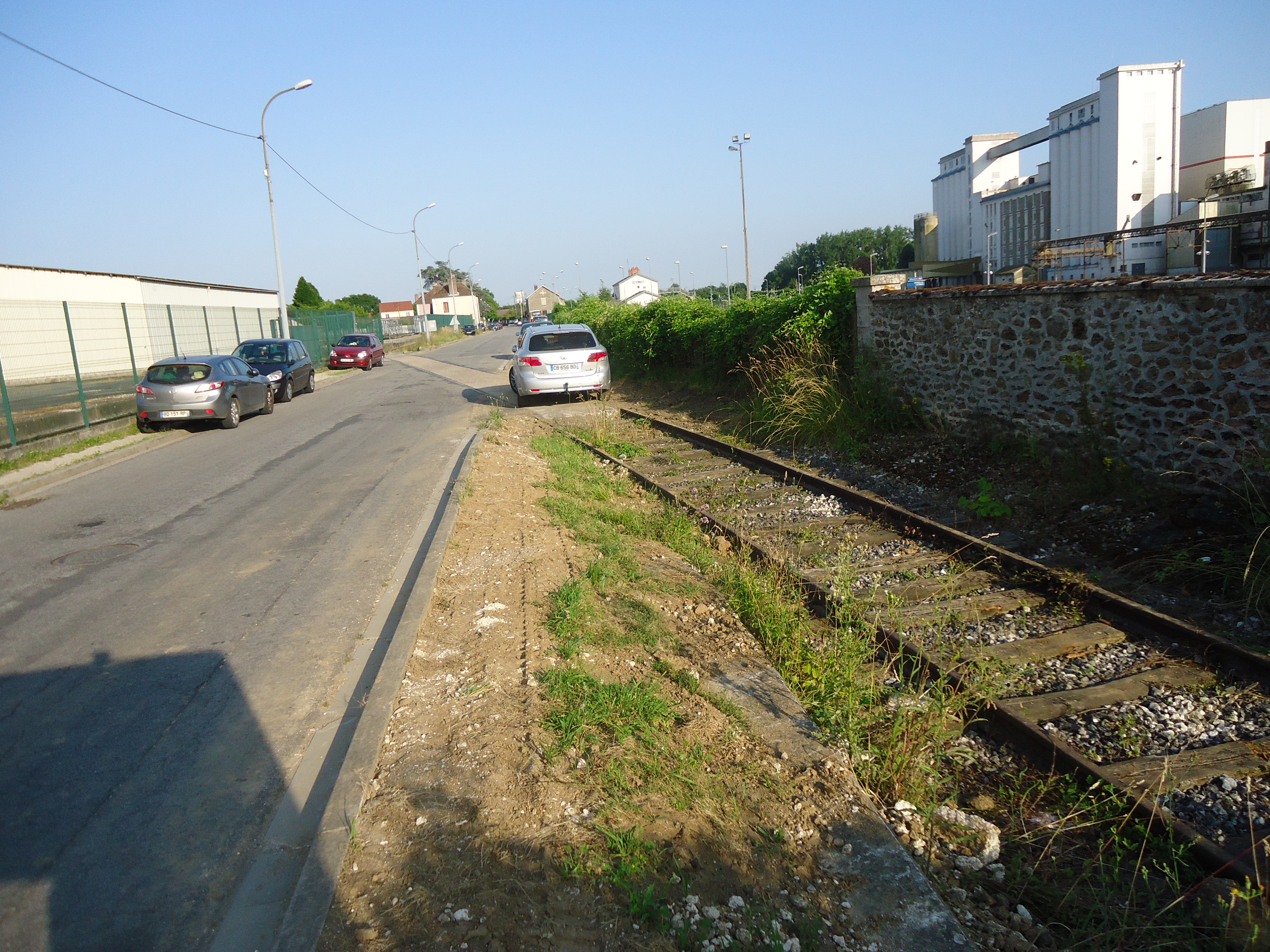
On the left, the location of the Verneuil tramway; on the right, the location of Verneuil station and, in the foreground, the tracks that connected the two.

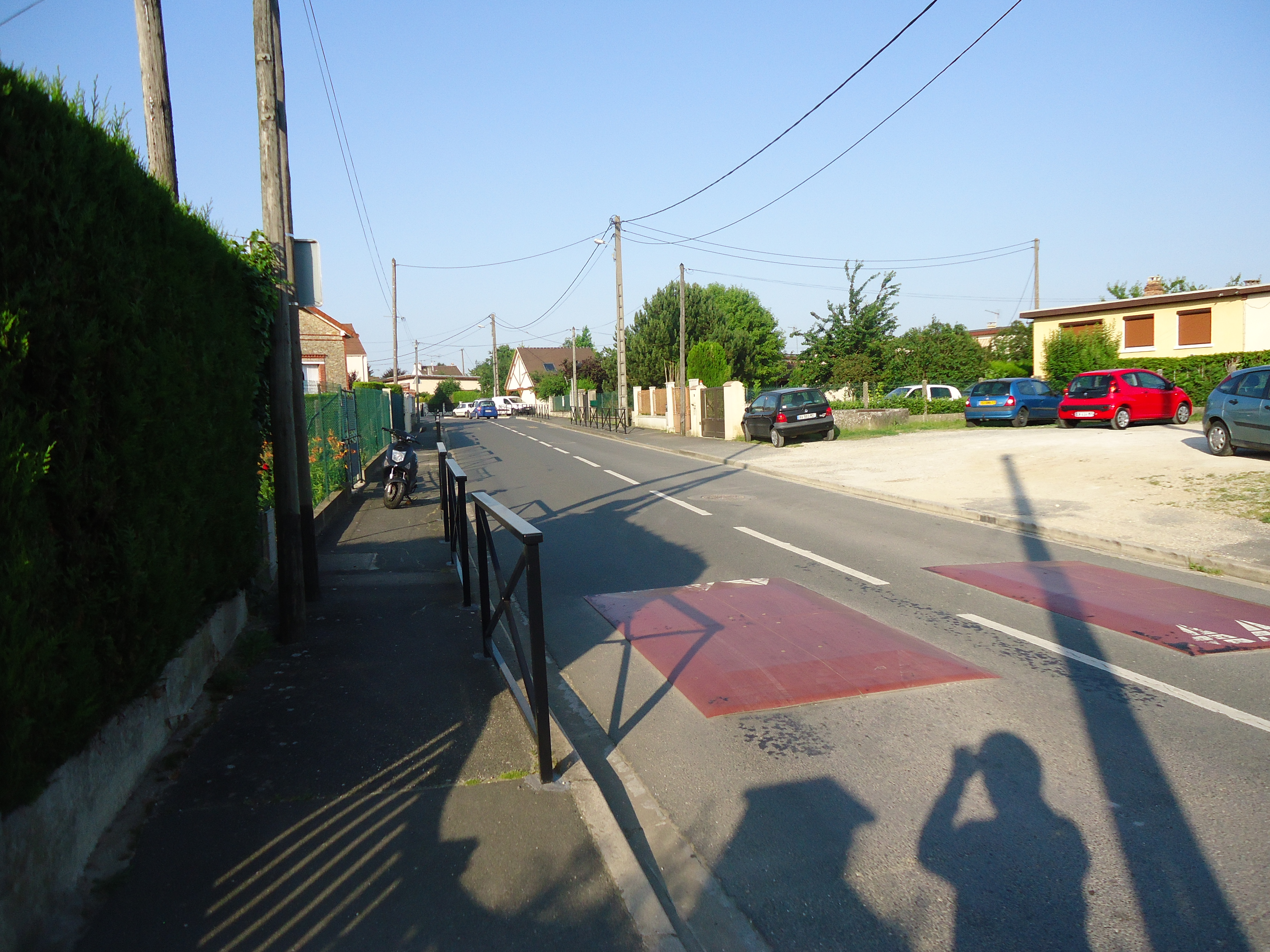
Location of the former Guignes-Ville station.

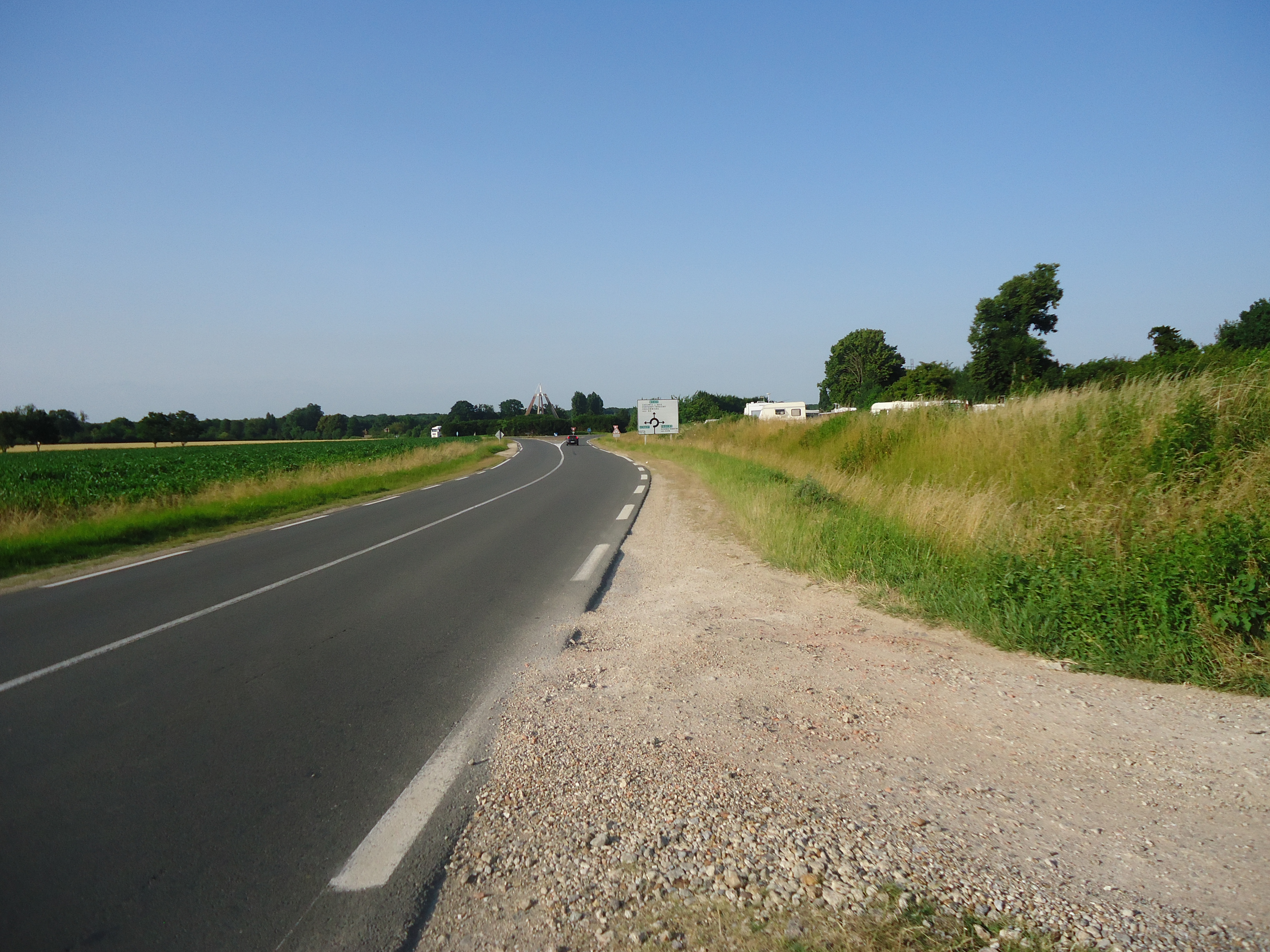
Location of the Guignes-Sucrerie station.

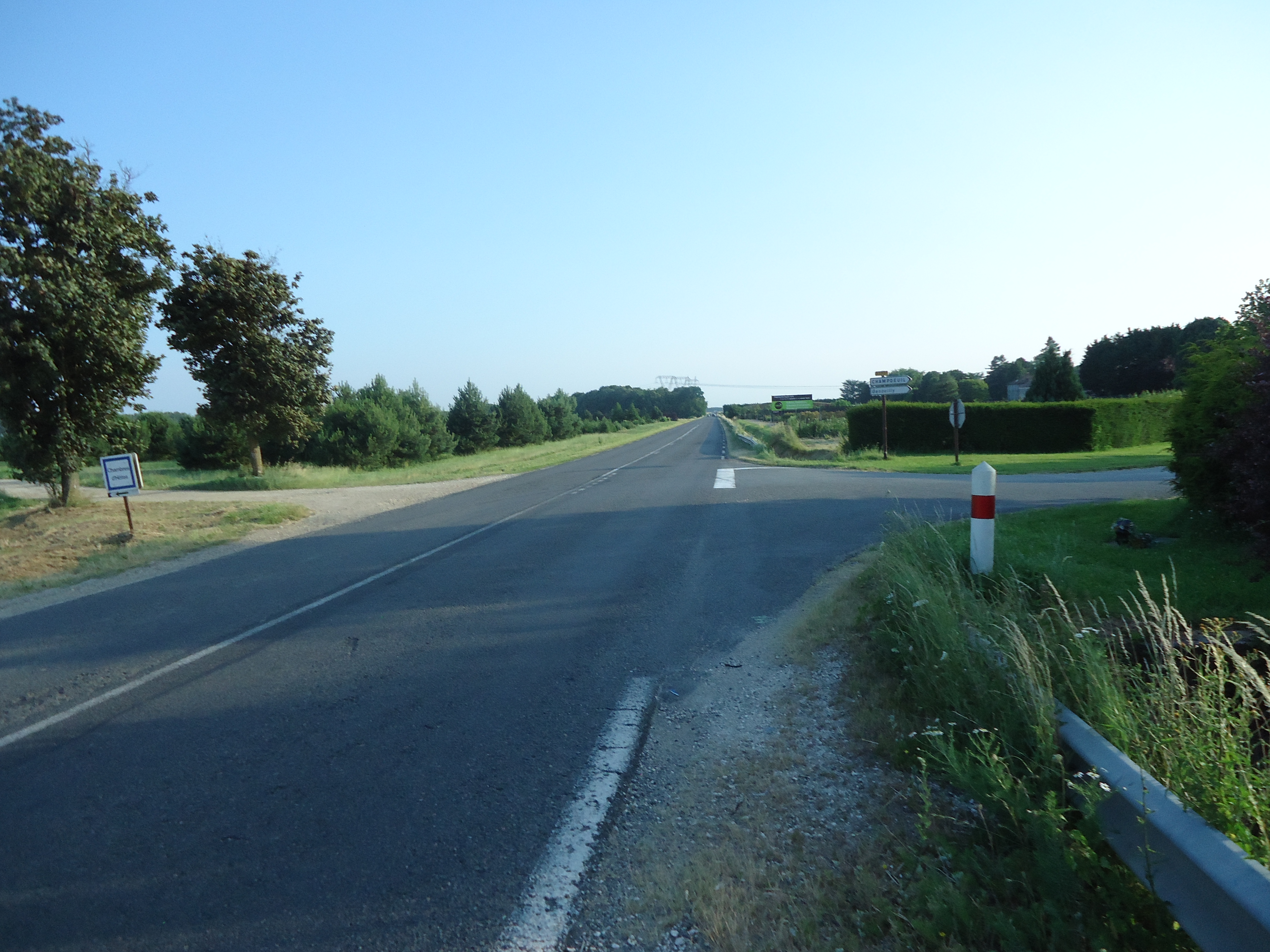
Location of the former Genouilly-Suscy station in the hamlet of Genouilly.

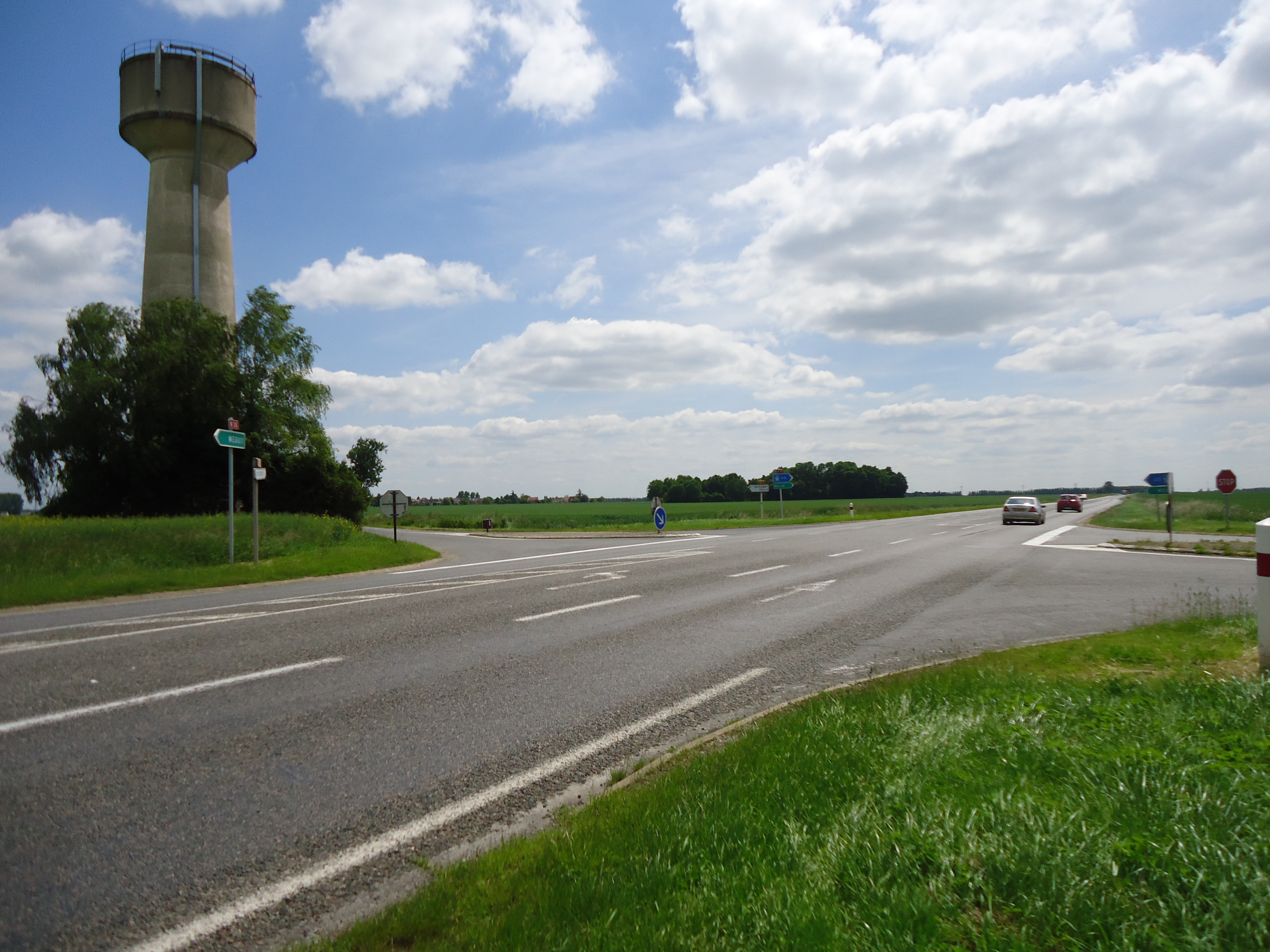
Location of the Champdeuil – Crisenoy station at the intersection between the RN 36 and the D 130 going to Champdeuil to the north and Crisenoy to the south.

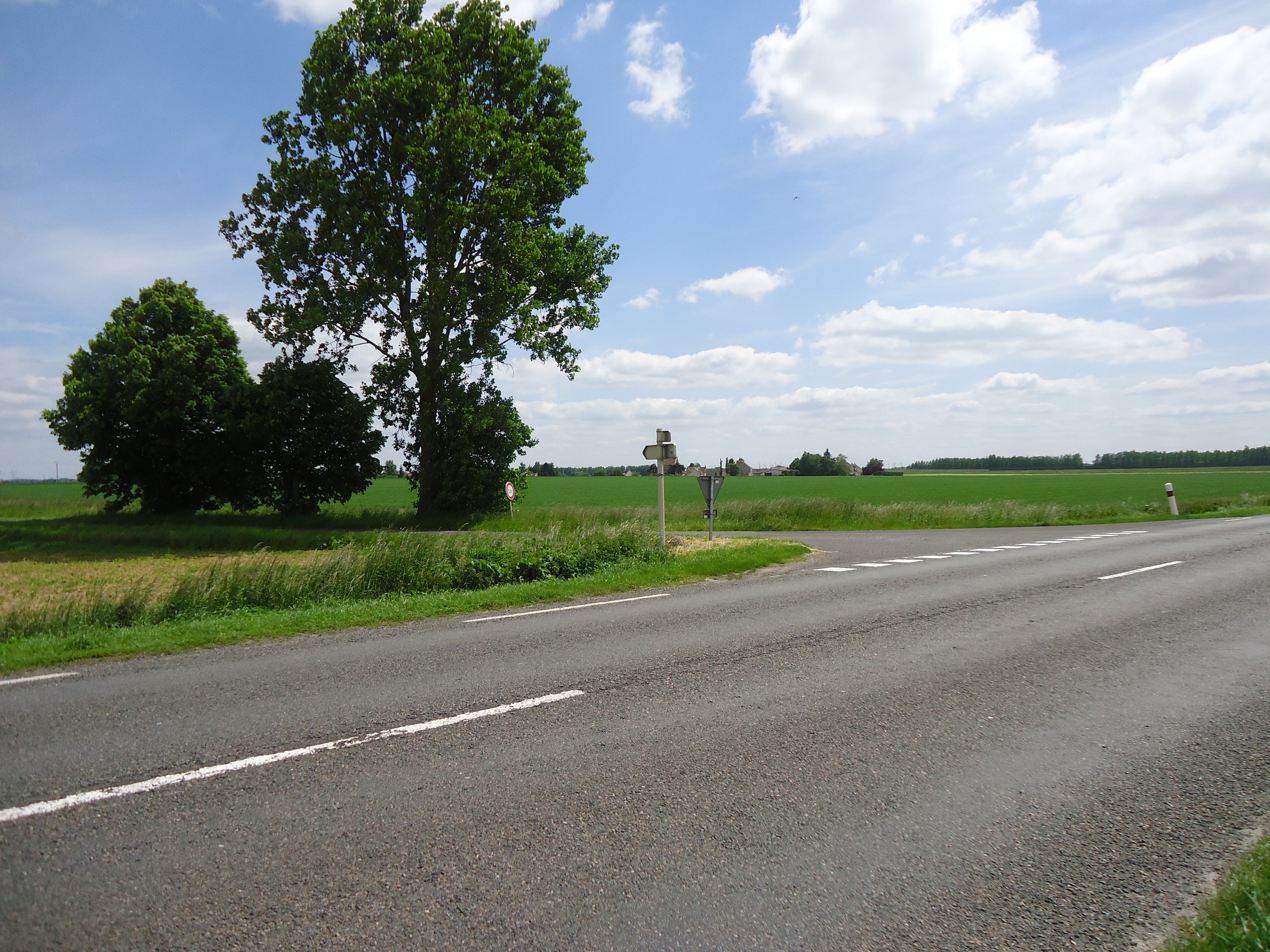
Location of the “Les Bordes” stop at the intersection of the RN 36 with a path leading to the hamlet.

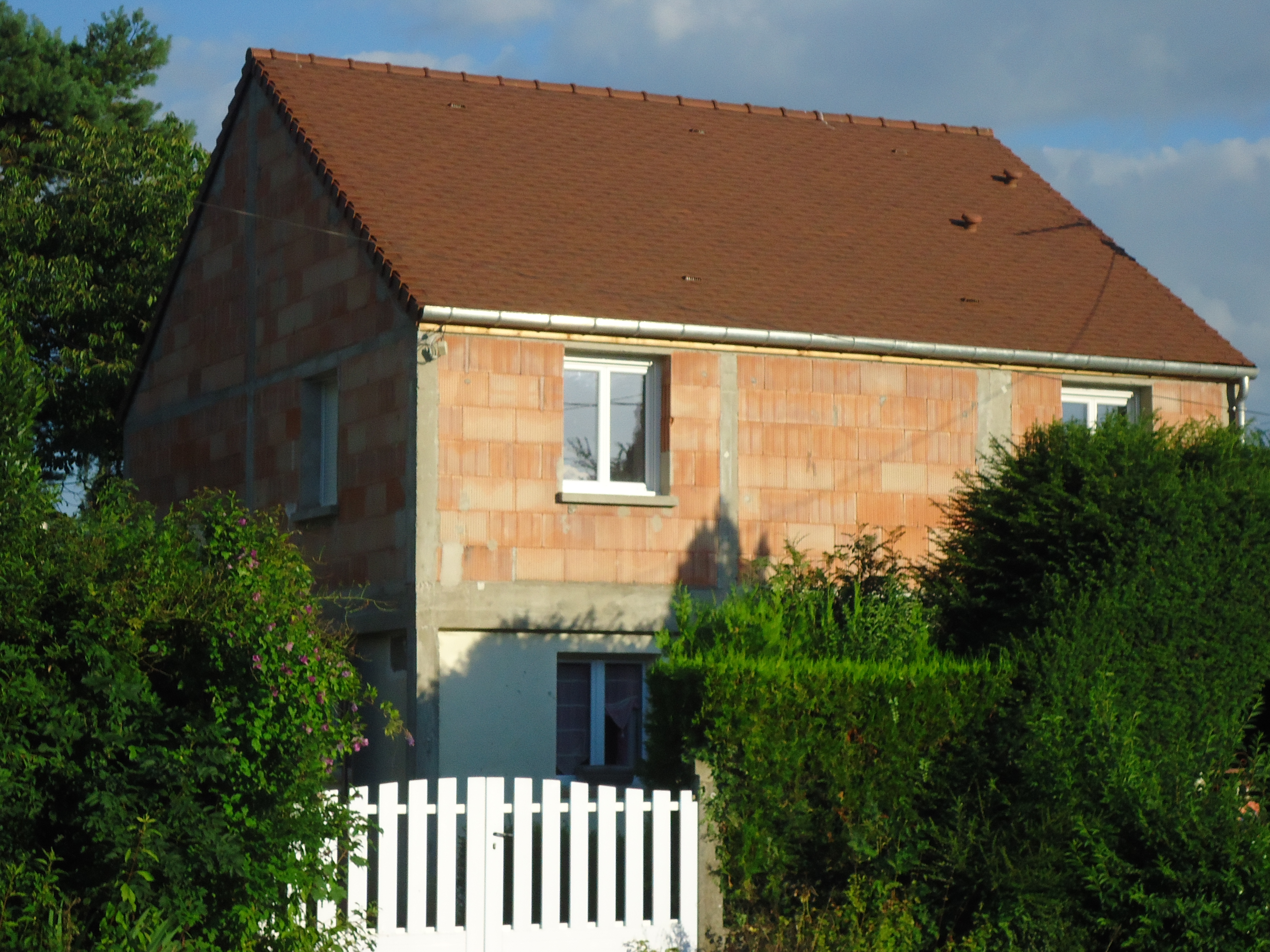
Saint-Germain-Laxis train station converted into a residential house.

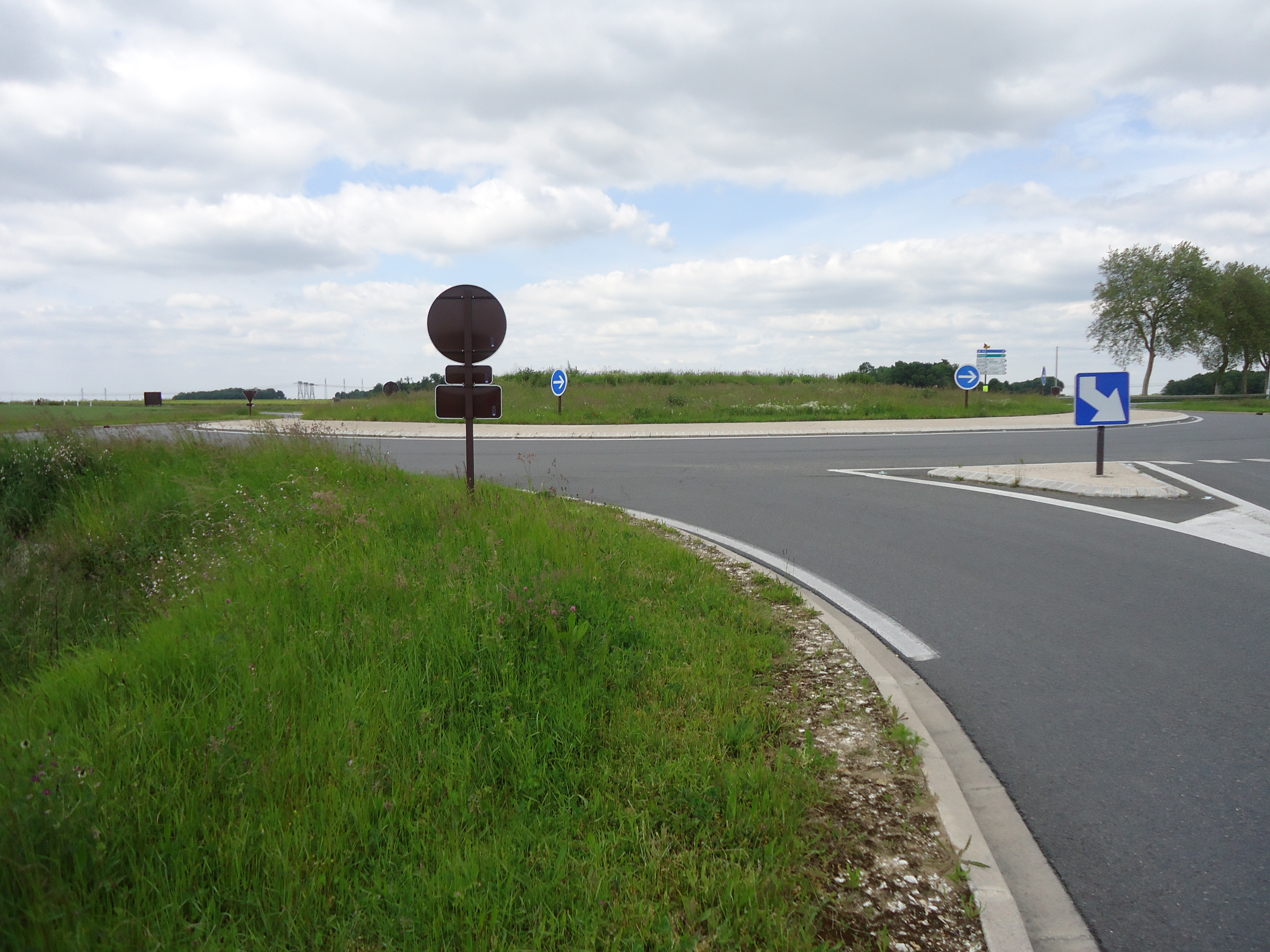
Location of the Rubelles – Voisenon stop, today a roundabout.

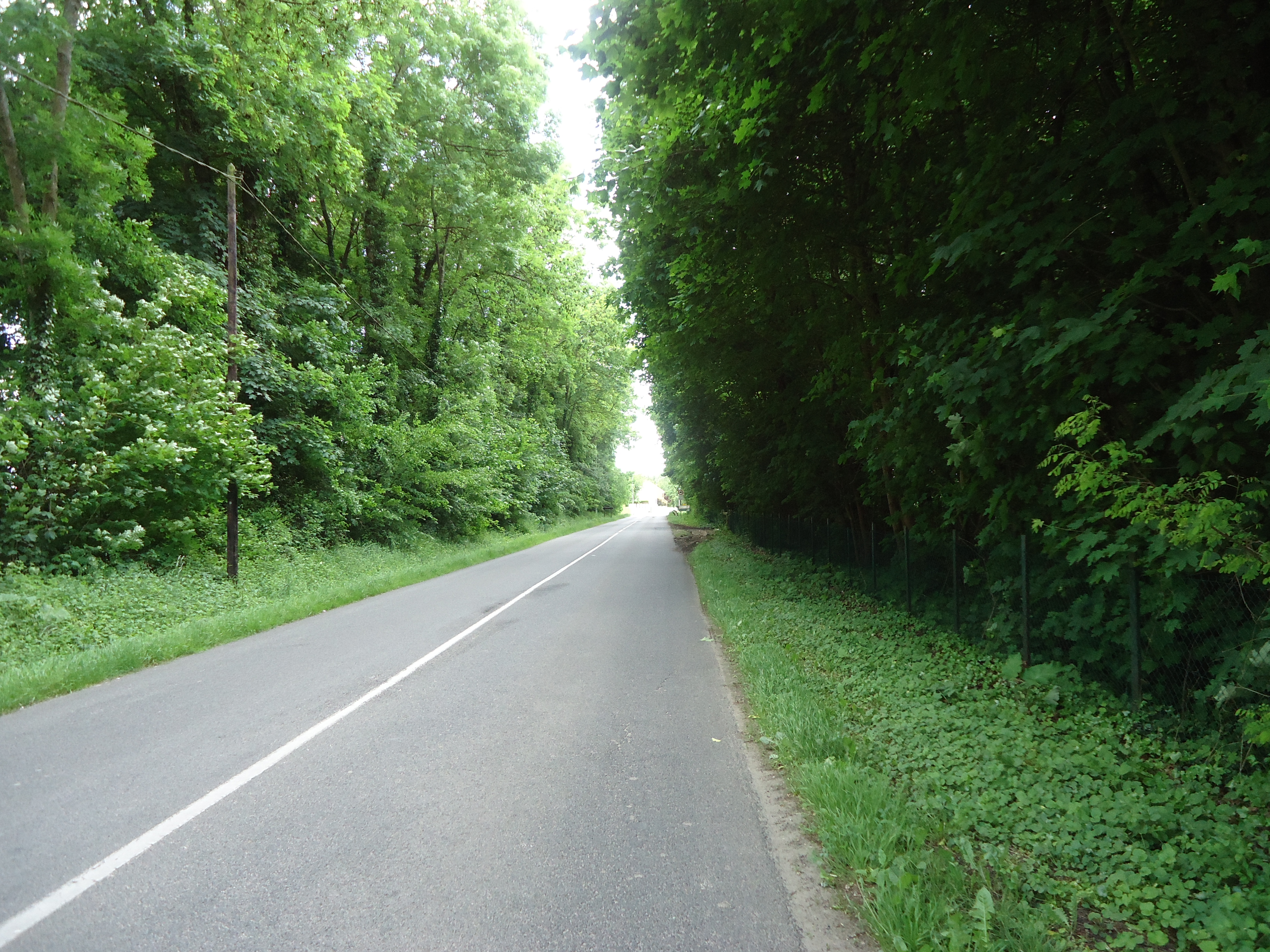
Current Boulevard Charles-de-Gaulle, between the stations "Trois-Moulins" and "Rubelles – Voisenon." The tramway was on the left.

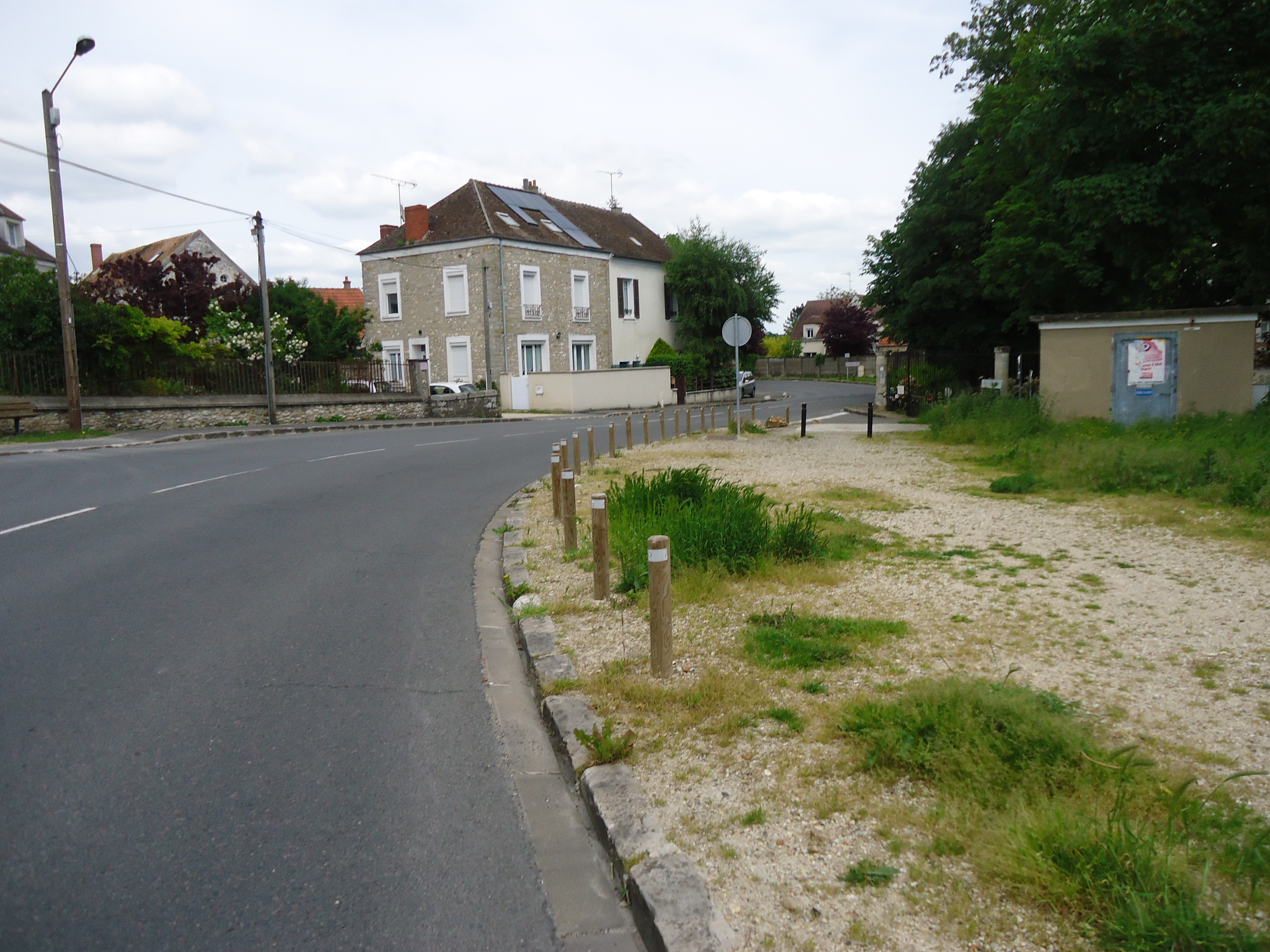
Route des Trois-Moulins, near the Trois-Moulins stop. The tram was on the right.

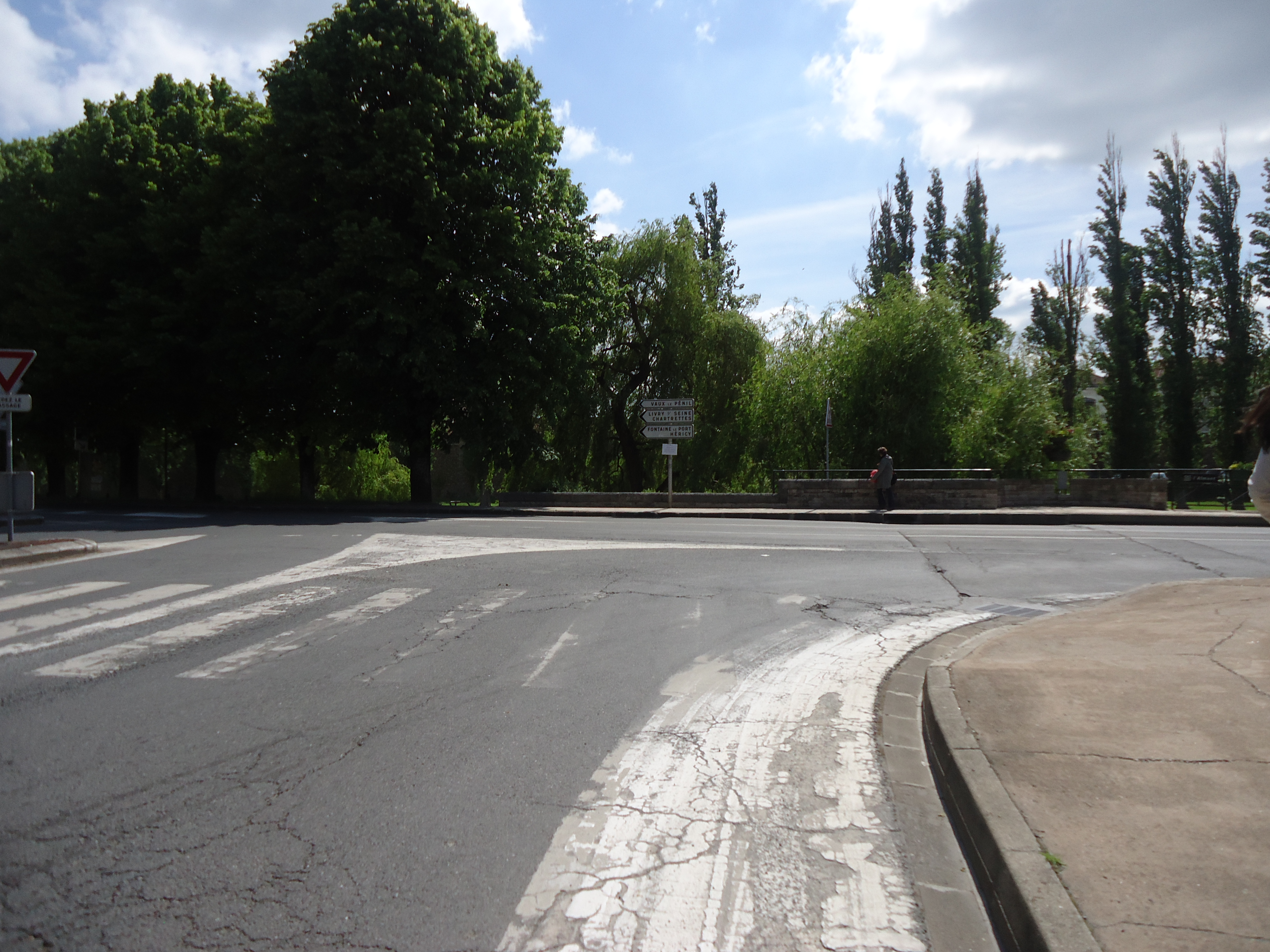
Location of the end of the tram line, beyond the Melun-Ville terminus station, near Almont.

=== External illustrations: 1949 to 1965 ===
- "The abandoned Melun tramway station in 1951". Delcampe. Archived from the original on January 13, 2019.
- "The abandoned Saint-Germain-Laxis station in 1959 and 1965 (2nd and 4th illustrations on the page)" (PDF). Delcampe (in French).

== See also ==
- Seine-et-Marne
- Verneuil-l'Étang station
- Melun station
- Tramway from Sablonnières to Bray-sur-Seine

== Bibliography ==
- Plancke, René-Charles (1991). Histoire du Chemin de Fer de Seine-et-Marne [History of the Seine-et-Marne Railway] (in French). Vol. II: Tacots, Tramways et Tortillards. Mée-sur-Seine: Édition Amatteis. ISBN 978-2868491138.
- Plancke, René-Charles (1994). Mormant et ses environs à la Belle Époque [Mormant and its surroundings during the Belle Époque] (in French). Mée-sur-Seine: Lys Ed. Presse – Ed. Amattéis. ISBN 978-2-86849-142-8.
