= Tramway from Sablonnières to Bray-sur-Seine =

Former French railway

Sablonnières - Bray-sur-Seine tramway
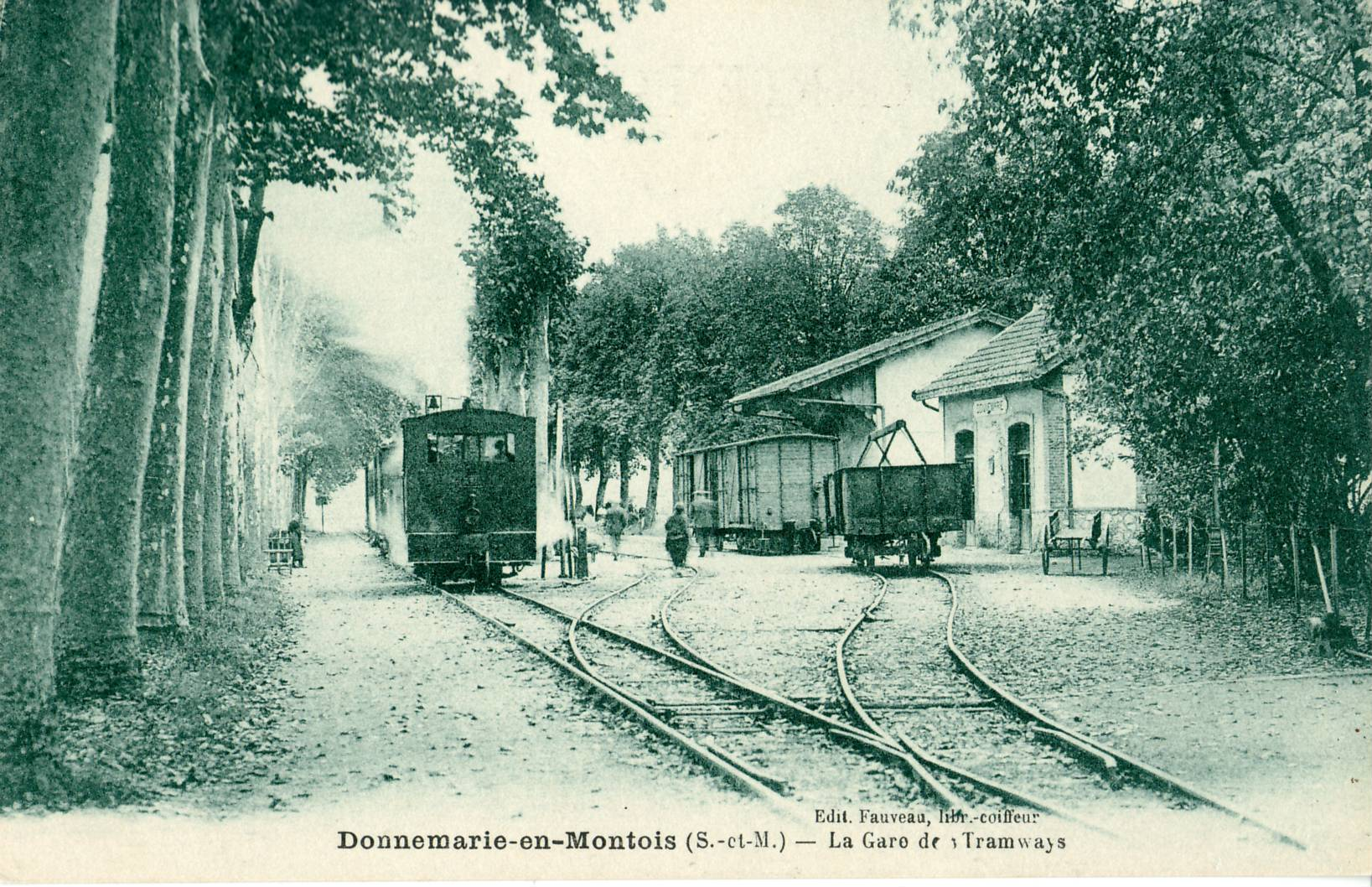
- Donnemarie-en-Montois Station

Overview
- Owner: Société générale des chemins de fer économiques (1902–1965)
- Locale: France
- Termini: 1902; 1965

Service
- Services: Jouy-le-Châtel, Sablonnières and Bray-sur-Seine

Technical
- Line length: 88 km (55 mi)
- Number of tracks: Single track
- Track gauge: Metre-gauge railway (1,000 m)
- Electrification: Not electrified

The tramway from Sablonnières to Bray-sur-Seine, also known as le Bricolo, was a secondary railway line operated from 1903 to 1954 by the Société générale des chemins de fer économiques (SE). It was the last line constructed in the company’s Seine-et-Marne network.

The line connected Bray-sur-Seine to Sablonnières. Built to metre gauge in several phases, it had a total length of 88 km.

The line saw an increase in ridership until 1914, when the First World War disrupted operations. During the interwar period, competition from road transport led to a decline in passenger traffic. As a result, profitability decreased, and the line eventually served primarily the sugar industry.

Unlike the other lines in the network, it did not cease all freight operations in 1950. Its sugar-related activities continued until 1965, after which the line was closed and dismantled.

== History ==
=== Project for the line ===
==== Petition from La Croix-en-Brie ====
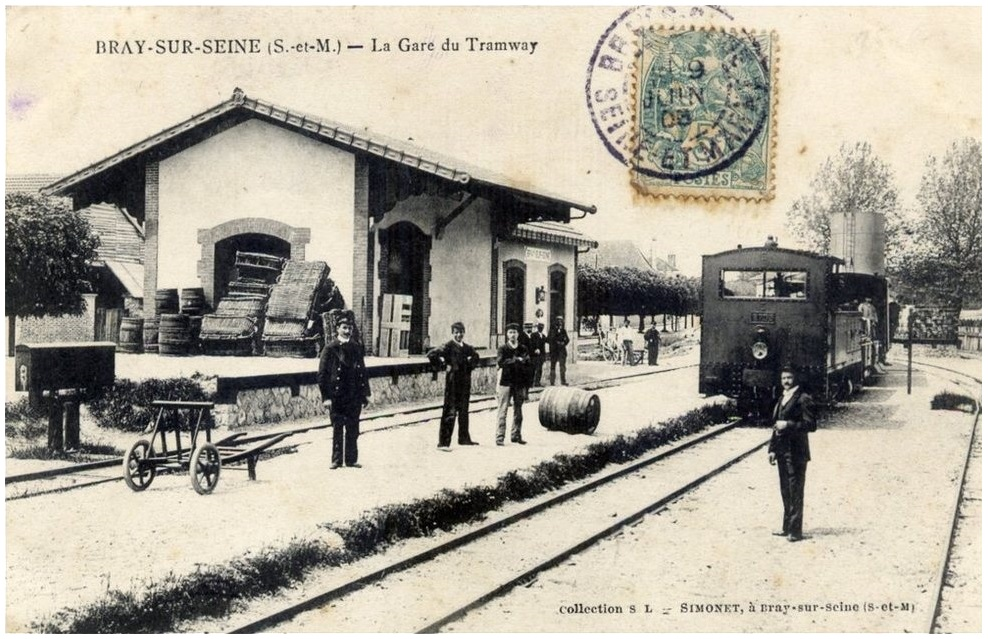
Bray-sur-Seine station at the beginning of the 20th century.

In the 19th century, numerous communes in Seine-et-Marne sought railway connections. On 22 March 1866, the village of La Croix-en-Brie, after reviewing a prefectural letter regarding a proposed local-interest line from Fontainebleau to La Ferté-sous-Jouarre via Nangis, expressed support for the project. The line, however, was never built.

The commune made a new attempt on 15 May 1881, at the mayor’s initiative, to support a project for a railway line crossing its territory. As part of the long-considered plan for a line from Nangis to Bray-sur-Seine, it proposed a route passing through La Croix-en-Brie, Jouy-le-Châtel, Beton-Bazoches, Choisy-en-Brie, and Saint-Siméon, with the possibility of a later extension to Nogent-l’Artaud via Rebais. In the meantime, the mayor concluded an agreement with Mr. Cornet-Corneille, a public carriage operator in Nangis, to operate an omnibus service between Nangis station and La Croix-en-Brie on Saturdays, Sundays, and Mondays, in exchange for a subsidy of 200 francs.

==== Conflict between the communes ====
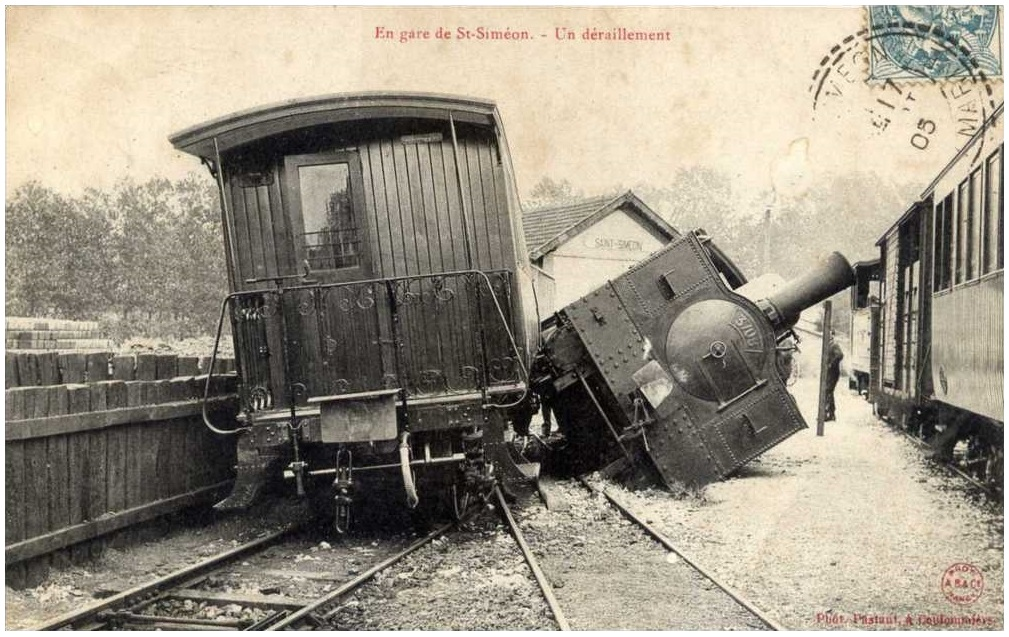
Collision at Saint-Siméon station before 1907.

The project for the line from Saint-Siméon to Bray was completed, but a dispute arose between La Croix-en-Brie and Gastins, located six kilometres apart, regarding the proposed route.

Noting that the General Council’s report did not mention the communes served between Saint-Siméon and Nangis, the commune of Gastins took the initiative. In February 1893, when the route between La Croix-en-Brie and Saint-Just-en-Brie was under study, Gastins argued that a line following Clos-Fontaine – Gastins – Pécy – Jouy would not be longer, would serve a larger population, and would transport twice as much freight. In May 1893, the municipal council of La Croix-en-Brie authorized its mayor to oppose the Gastins route by presenting the advantages of its own proposed route. The dispute between the two communes continued, but in 1895 the department supported La Croix-en-Brie and approved its route.

Gastins maintained that there were no substantial reasons to adopt the selected route. The commune eventually received rail service in 1941, limited to the transport of sugar beets. Following this, construction work on the line could commence.

==== Construction of the line ====
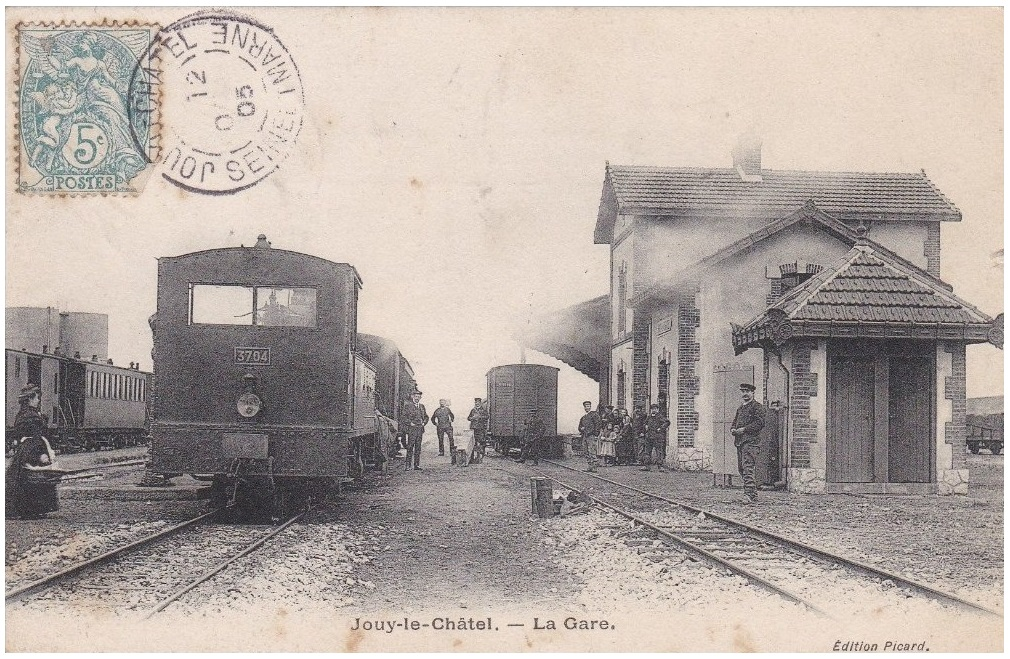
Jouy-le-Châtel station at the beginning of the 20th century.

Management of the construction site was assigned to Mr. Heude, first-class chief engineer of Bridges and Roads in Melun, for the duration of the works. Supervision of the sections from Marles to Jouy and from Sablonnières to Bray was entrusted to Mr. Arnaud, a second-class engineer.

Tenders were issued for several contracts. Construction of the line’s buildings was awarded to Bouché fils of Nangis. Earthworks, ballasting, and track laying were assigned to different companies: from Jouy to Bray to the Cordier company of Verneuil-l’Étang, from Jouy to Saint-Siméon to the Dequeker brothers of Paris, and from Saint-Siméon to Sablonnières to the Bougain company of Mâcon.

Work by the Cordier company began behind schedule on the section toward Nangis, which was reached in September 1902, and continued to Bray, reached in November 1904. The Dequeker company, starting from Jouy, completed the section to Beton-Bazoches in February 1902 and to Saint-Siméon in February 1903. The section from Saint-Siméon to Sablonnières was completed in November 1904.

=== Opening of the line ===
==== Delays in opening ====
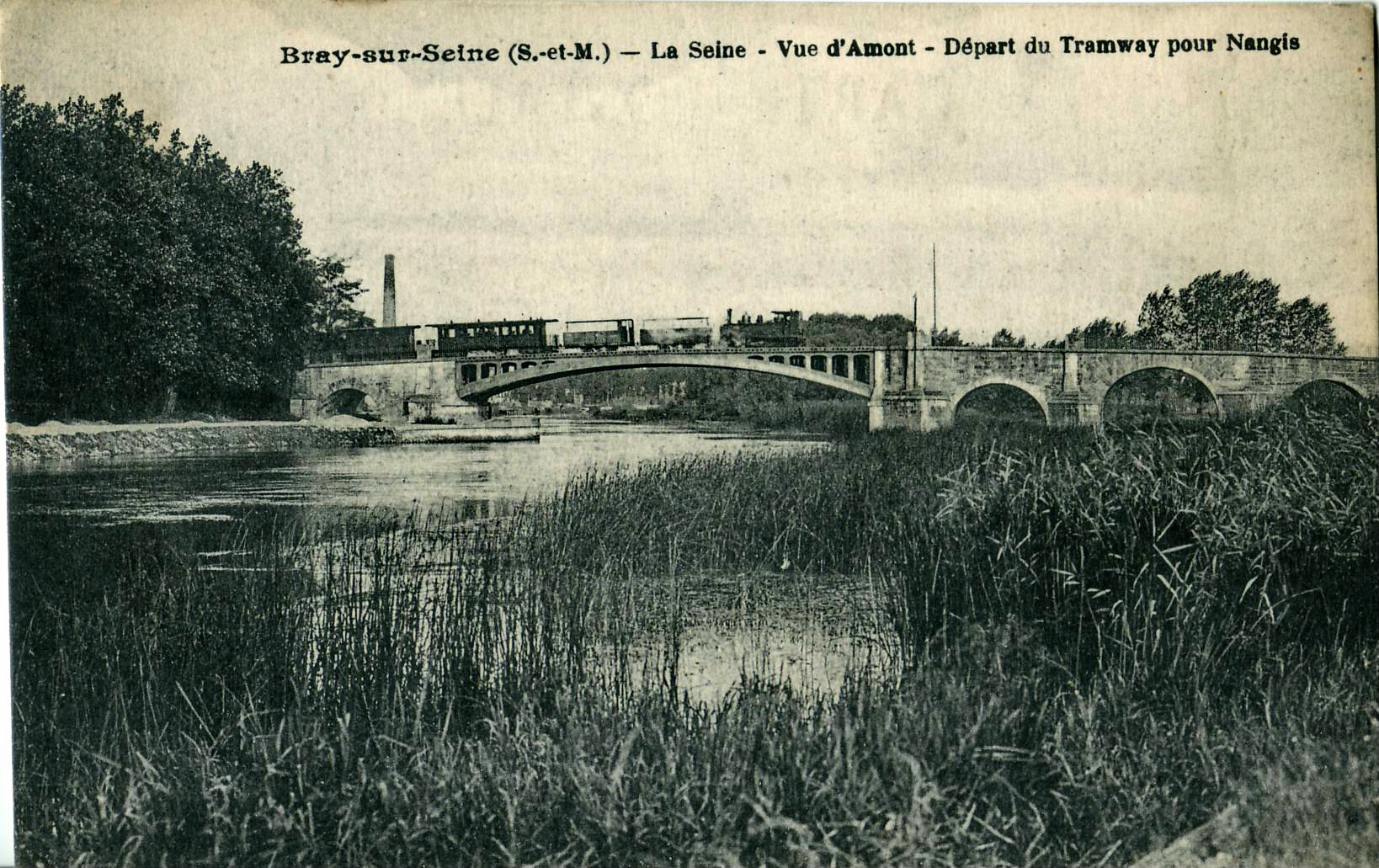
The Seine - View from upstream - Departure of the tramway for Nangis at Bray-sur-Seine.

The section from Jouy-le-Châtel to Beton-Bazoches was completed relatively quickly. The company requested that this section be opened to traffic on 29 May 1902 and also proposed the installation of a turntable, an engine shed, and a water crane at the temporary terminus. The department declined, preferring to wait until the line to Saint-Siméon was fully completed before commencing operations.

Reconnaissance tours were conducted on each section using cars provided by the Société générale des chemins de fer économiques and hauled by locomotives used for transporting ballast, rails, and sleepers. These inspections occurred on 27 September 1902 from Nangis to Jouy, on 16 February 1903 from Saint-Siméon to Jouy, on 13 November 1903 from Saint-Siméon to Sablonnières, and on 28 November 1904 from Nangis to Bray. Although the section from Nangis to Bray was completed by July 1902, operations were initially limited to the northern outskirts of Nangis because a flyover was required to cross the Paris-Est to Mulhouse-Ville line. The bridge was completed on 11 May 1903.

The section from Jouy to Saint-Siméon opened on 23 March 1903 after delays caused by track subsidence in certain areas and disagreements with the Compagnie de l’Est over the location of the Saint-Siméon station.

The final section from Nangis to Bray was also delayed. On 20 August 1904, the company requested authorization to open the segment from Nangis to Donnemarie-en-Montois, but the department declined due to the high costs of establishing a temporary terminus. The line officially opened on 4 December 1904.

Upon entering service, the line offered three daily round trips. The trains, which carried both passengers and goods, operated in segments—Bray to Nangis, Nangis to Saint-Siméon, and Saint-Siméon to Sablonnières—without through connections. Traveling the entire line required a full day, including waits of up to four and a half hours at the terminus stations.

==== First World War ====
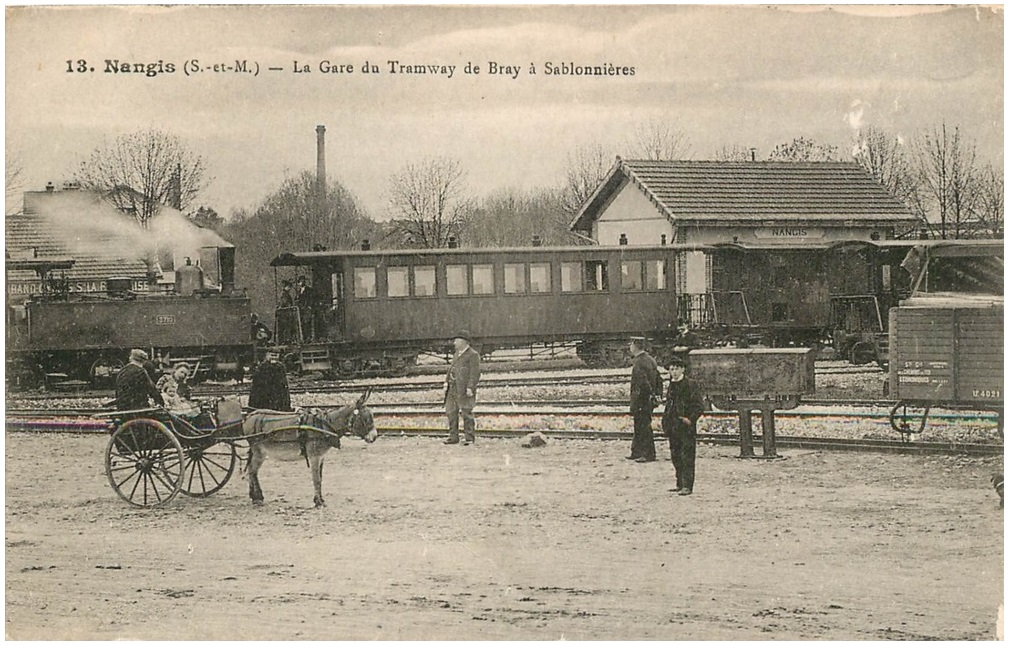
Nangis tram station around 1907.

At the outbreak of the First World War, the tramway was used by reservists to reach their assigned units. On 8 August 1914, passenger service was reduced to two round trips per day, while several special trains were operated for military supplies.

Between 5 and 22 September, the trains initially transported civilians fleeing the advance of the German army. Service was subsequently suspended due to the military situation and the disruption of the network. On 22 September, a limited service of a single round trip between Bray and Nangis was reinstated, and by 25 September, two round trips were restored across the entire line.

Until May 1918, despite shortages of wagons and multiple requisitions, the line contributed to the war effort. Between 16 and 28 August 1918, it transported 13,500 soldiers and 14,000 tonnes of goods.

From 2 June to 28 August 1918, the section from Sablonnières to Saint-Siméon was operated by a detachment of the 10th Section of Field Railways to supply the front.

After the war, the workshop at Jouy-le-Châtel restored the equipment, and demobilized staff repaired the tracks, allowing the tramway to resume part of its pre-war operations.

=== Decline ===
==== Competition from road transport ====
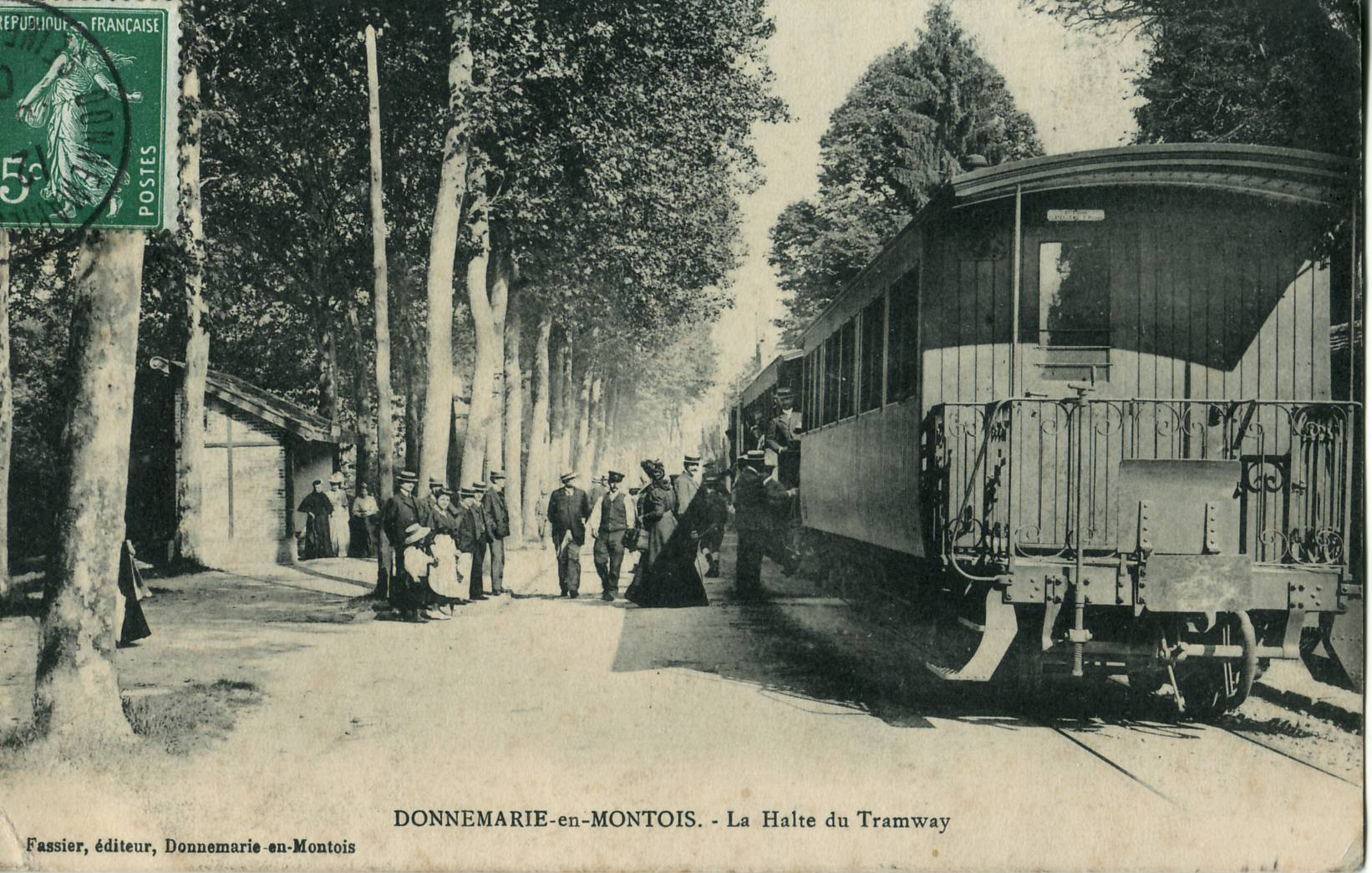
Donnemarie stop.

In 1920, the company received departmental subsidies to purchase fourteen wagons from military surplus. By 1923, only two wagons were in service, and the company requested authorization to order thirty additional covered wagons, the last of which were delivered on 15 September 1924.

By 1927, passengers began to abandon the line in favor of road transport, citing the slow speeds, long travel times, and poorly coordinated connections.

In the same year, it was decided to maintain the lines from Verneuil to Melun and from Jouy-le-Châtel to Marles-en-Brie, while the line from Bray-sur-Seine to Sablonnières was converted to road transport around 1931.

The Verneuil tramway subsequently underwent maintenance work to preserve the network.

In 1927, the General Council sought to improve the efficiency of the tramway and address competition from road transport. At the time, the Compagnie Générale d’Entreprises Automobiles had established several bus lines across the department, including routes from Nangis to Melun and from Coulommiers to Melun, which competed with the tramway. Additionally, automotive repair and sales services were available in the communes along the route.

==== End of the line ====
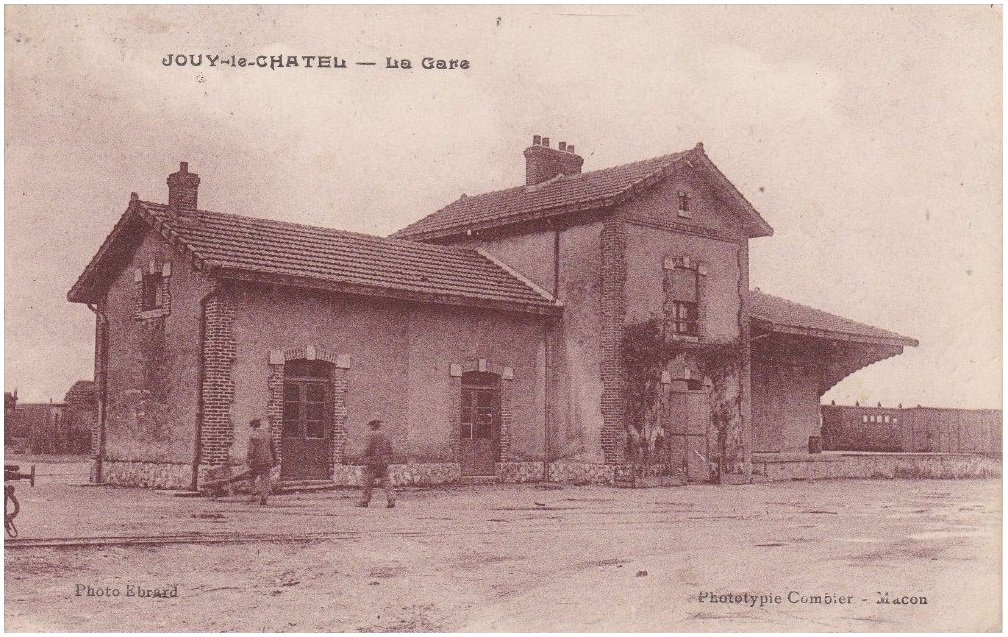
Jouy-le-Châtel station at the beginning of the 20th century.

Faced with this collapse in ridership, the General Council of Seine-et-Marne decided to close the line to passenger traffic on 26 September 1933, with the last service operating on 15 January 1934. Following this, the line continued to carry freight with one daily round trip, in addition to postal and parcel services provided by three railcars acquired in 1926, 1933, and 1934.

On 12 February 1938, the municipal council of Jouy-le-Châtel requested the continuation of freight services along the entire route and the reopening of passenger traffic. The department subsequently ordered the closure of the line to all traffic on 1 September 1938.

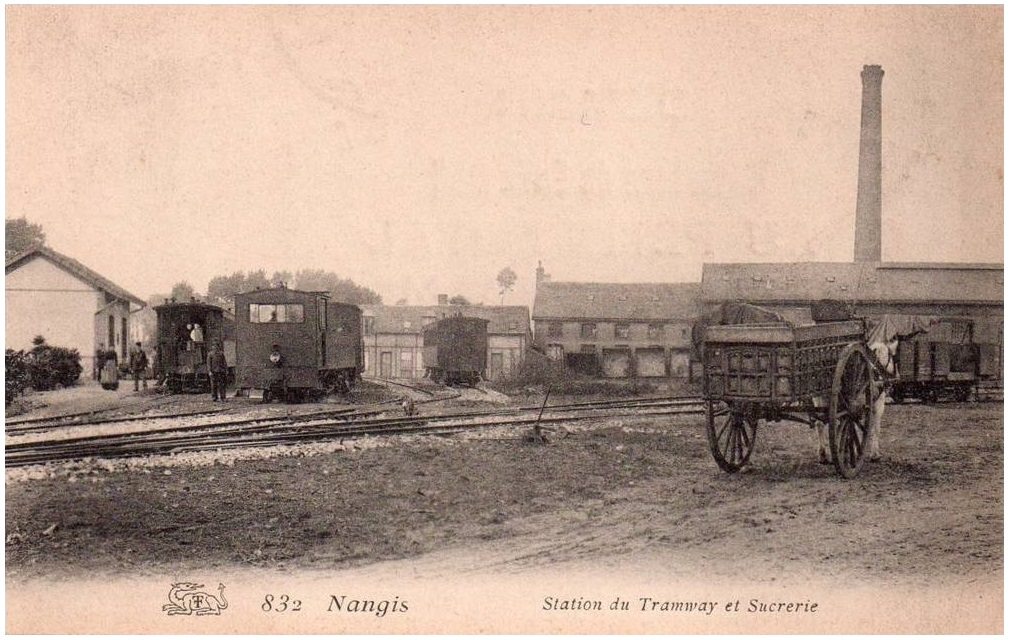
Nangis tram station and sugar factory

On 14 June 1940, a passenger train operated to transport evacuees. A section of the line between Beton-Bazoches and Saint-Siméon was reopened for freight traffic with one daily round trip. From 1942 to 1948, passenger service resumed between Jouy-le-Châtel and Nangis due to the suspension of road services caused by fuel shortages. The section from Saint-Siméon to Sablonnières was dismantled in 1943.

In 1950, the General Council, noting the normalization of road transport, decided to close the entire network, including the remaining tramway section from Sablonnières to Bray. The official closure took effect on 1 July 1950. Tracks were retained until the downgrading of the sections from Bray to the Rogervilliers junction and from Jouy to Beton on 2 March 1952.

A section of the network was preserved and remained in operation between Rogervilliers (a hamlet shared by Fontains and Rampillon) and between Jouy-le-Châtel and the Gastins junction to serve the Nangis sugar factory.

The service continued for fifteen years, ending on 31 January 1965. Jean Delmotte, director of the Nangis sugar factory, who died on 24 April 1965, had been committed to maintaining rail service. After the closure, the sugar factory shifted to using trucks for the transport of sugar beets.

== See also ==
- Seine-et-Marne
- Tramway from Verneuil-l'Étang to Melun

== Bibliography ==
- Delmotte, J (1964). "L'exploitation du réseau des C. F. E. de Seine-et-Marne au cours de la Guerre 1914-1918" [The operation of the C.F.E. network in Seine-et-Marne during the 1914-1918 War]. Chemins de fer secondaires, revue de la FACS (in French). 1964-V (65): 1–19.
- Plancke, René-Charles (1991). Histoire du Chemin de Fer de Seine-et-Marne, t. II : Tacots, Tramways et Tortillards [History of the Seine-et-Marne Railway, Vol. II: Old Cars, Trams, and Slow Trains] (in French). Mée-sur-Seine: Amatteis. ISBN 978-2-86849-113-8.
