= Communauté de communes de la Visandre =

Coordinates: 48.655°N 3.075°E

Visandre
- Former communauté de communes
- Interactive map of Visandre
- Country: France
- Region: Île-de-France
- Department: Seine-et-Marne
- No. of communes: {{{nbcomm}}}
- Established: 2000
- Disbanded: 2010
- Area: 130.11 km^{2} (50.24 sq mi)
- Population (1999): 4,020
  - Density: 30.9/km^{2} (80.0/sq mi)

The Communauté de communes de la Visandre is a former federation of municipalities (communauté de communes) in the Seine-et-Marne département and in the Île-de-France région of France. It was created in December 2000. It was dissolved in 2010.

== Composition ==
The Communauté de communes comprised the following communes:

- La Croix-en-Brie
- Gastins
- Jouy-le-Châtel
- Pécy
- Vaudoy-en-Brie

== See also ==
- Communes of the Seine-et-Marne department
