= Nangis - Les Loges aerodrome =

Nangis - Les Loges aerodrome Aérodrome de Nangis - Les Loges
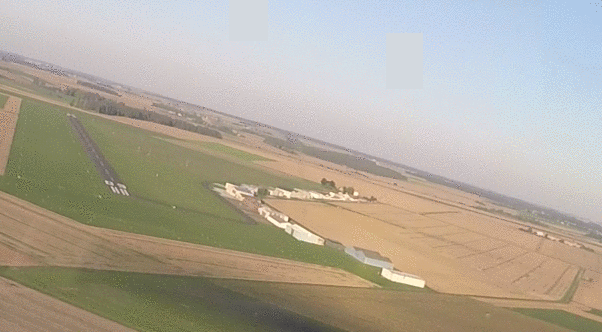
- IATA: none; ICAO: LFAI

Summary
- Airport type: Public
- Operator: Grandpuits-Bailly-Carrois council
- Serves: Nangis, France
- Elevation AMSL: 428 ft / 130 m
- Coordinates: 48°35′49″N 003°00′29″E

Map
- Location of Nangis - Les Loges aerodrome

Runways
Direction	Length		Surface
Direction	m	ft	Surface
05/23	955	3,133	Asphalt
05/23	1,025	3,363	Grass
05/23 (ultralight)	350	1,148	Grass

Nangis - Les Loges is an aerodrome near Nangis, France. It is located 60 km south-east of Paris.

== Traffic ==
The aerodrome is open to light and ultralight aviation under visual flight rules. In 2014, it handled 30,000 aircraft movements, making it the 53rd busiest French aerodrome in terms of traffic.

== Facilities ==
The airfield has two parallel runways (05/23) for airplanes. One is paved and measures 955 × 20 meters, while the other is unpaved and measures 1025 × 60 meters. Additionally, there is a separate unpaved runway for ultralight aviation.

== Access ==
Nangis aerodrome is not served by public transport.
