= La Chapelle-Rablais =

- Commune
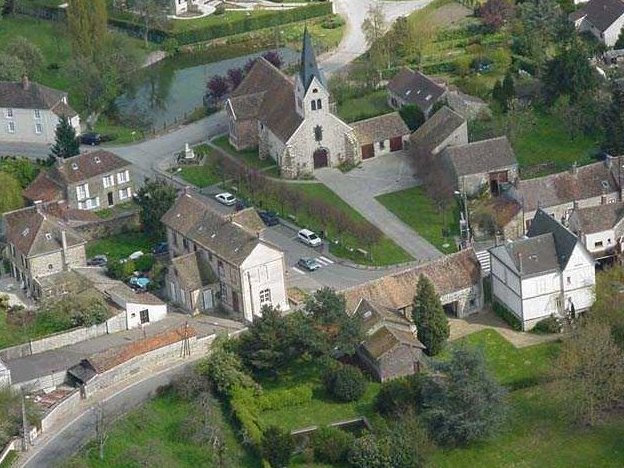
- An aerial view of La Chapelle-Rablais

- Coat of arms
- Location of La Chapelle-Rablais
- Location within France Location within Île-de-France (region)
- Coordinates: 48°30′43″N 2°58′21″E
- Country: France
- Region: Île-de-France
- Department: Seine-et-Marne
- Arrondissement: Provins
- Canton: Nangis
- Intercommunality: CC Brie Nangissienne

Government
  - Mayor (2020–2026): Marcel Fontellio
- Area^{1}: 15.44 km^{2} (5.96 sq mi)
- Highest elevation: 136 m (446 ft)
- Lowest elevation: 104 m (341 ft)
- Population (2023): 913
  - Density: 59.1/km^{2} (153/sq mi)
- Time zone: UTC+01:00 (CET)
  - Summer (DST): UTC+02:00 (CEST)
- INSEE/Postal code: 77089 /77370
- ^{1} French Land Register data, which excludes lakes, ponds, glaciers > 1 km^{2} (0.386 sq mi or 247 acres) and river estuaries.

La Chapelle-Rablais (French pronunciation: [la ʃapɛl ʁablɛ]) is a commune in the Seine-et-Marne department in the Île-de-France region in north-central France.

Its inhabitants are called the Capello-Rablaisiens.

== Geography ==
=== Location ===
La Chapelle-Rablais is located in the heart of Brie, 8 km (4.97 miles) southwest of Nangis.

=== Bordering municipalities ===
Communes bordering La Chapelle-Rablais
Fontenailles (5.4 km )	Nangis (7.4 km )	Fontains (4.6 km )
		Villeneuve-les-Bordes (7.5 km )
Échouboulains (4.8 km )	Laval-en-Brie (10.1 km )	Coutençon (5.6 km )

=== Geology and relief ===
The town is classified in seismicity zone 1, corresponding to a very low seismicity.

=== Hydrography ===
The municipality's hydrographic system consists of nine referenced rivers:

- the Almont (or ru d'Ancœur or ru de Courtenain), which is 42.15 km long and a tributary of the Seine, as well as;
  - the Courtenain arm, 0.53 km ;
  - the ditch 01 of the Grand Buisson du Mée, 1.35 km, and;
  - Mauny stream 01, 1.16 km, tributaries of the Almont;
    - the ditch 01 of the Bois de Putemuse, 1.04 km , tributary of the stream 01 of Mauny;
- the Ru de Villefermoy, 8.19 km ;
  - the Ru des Prés des Vallées, 3.97 km , and;
  - the ditch 02 of the Bois de la Chapelle, 3.61 km, and;
  - the ditch 01 of the Forêt Domaniale de Villefermoy, 2.95 km, which merges with the ru de Villefermoy.

The overall linear length of watercourses in the municipality is 11.01 km (6.84 mi).

=== Communication and Transport Routes ===
The closest station to the town is the Nangis station on the Paris-Est - Provins line of the Transilien Paris-Est network. This line is now served by new Bombardier B 82500 dual-energy trains .

== Urbanism ==
=== Localities, deviations and districts ===
The town has 47 administrative localities listed including Les Montils, and Les Moyeux .

=== Land use ===
In 2018, the territory of the municipality was 53.4% being forest land, 40.3% arable land, 4.6% of urbanized areas and 1.7% of artificial green spaces that were of non-agricultural purpose

== See also ==
- Communes of the Seine-et-Marne department
