= Almont (river) =

River in France

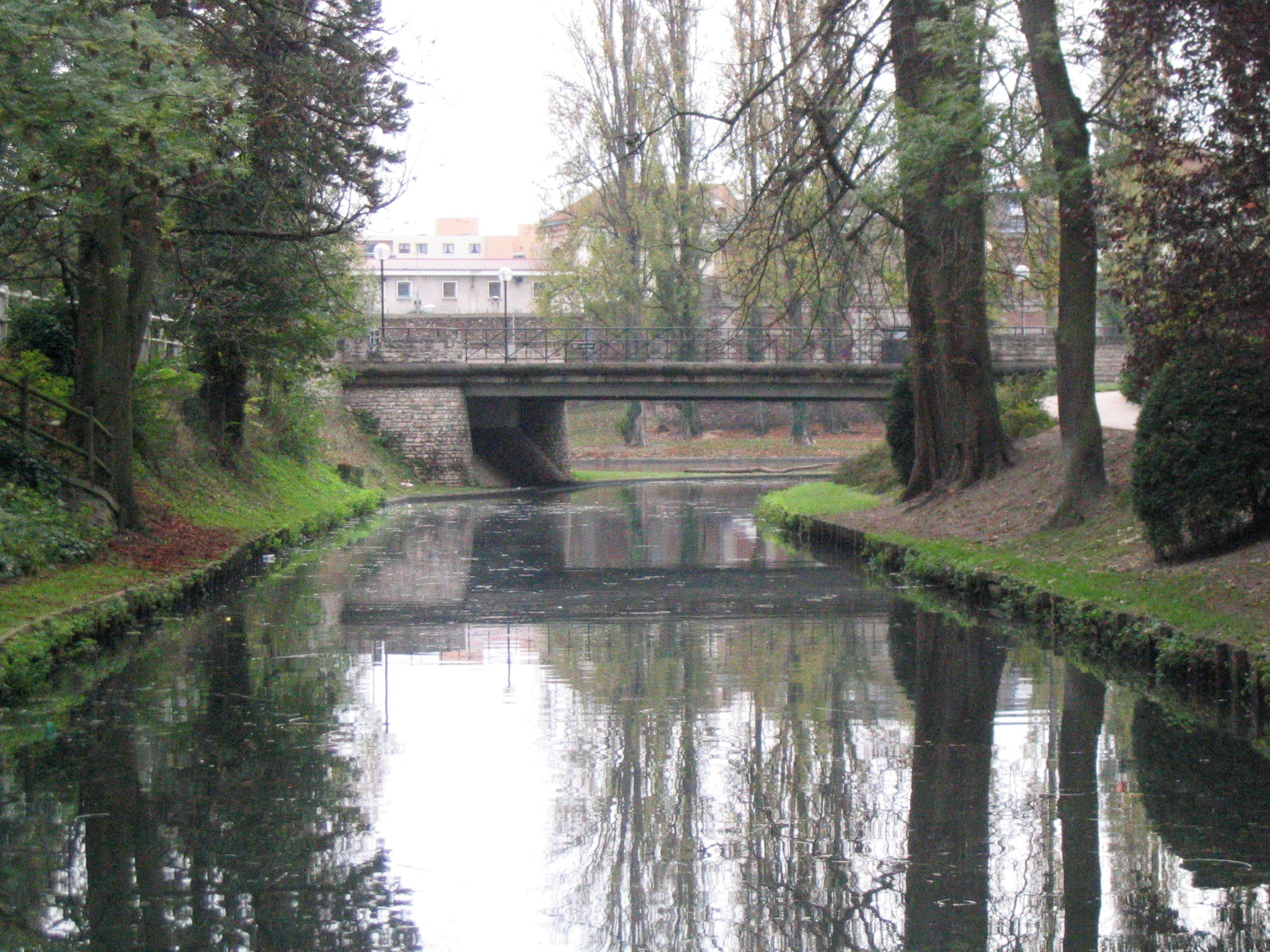

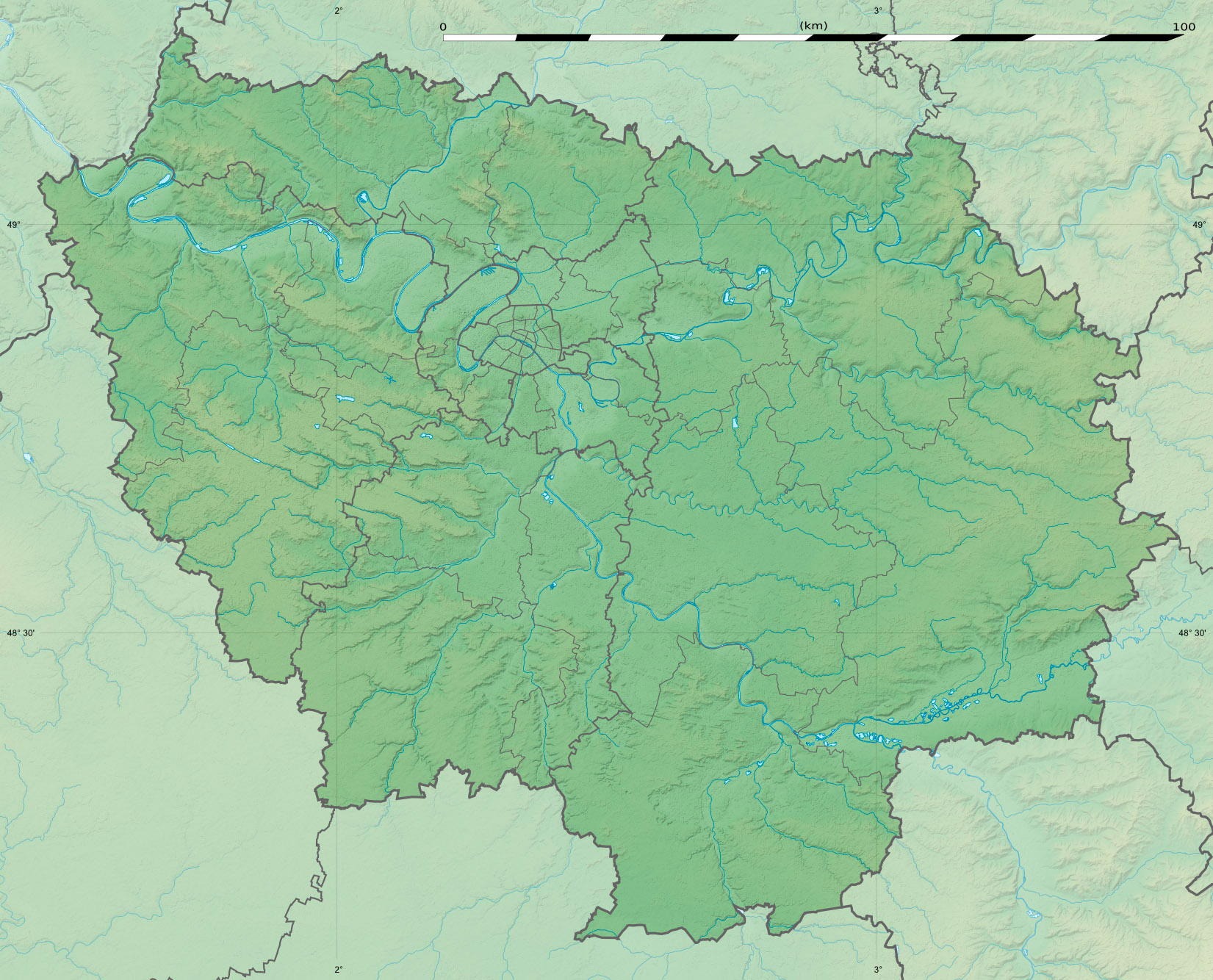
- Location within France Location within Île-de-France (region)

Location
- Country: France

Physical characteristics
- Mouth: Seine
  - location: Melun
  - coordinates: 48.5357°N 2.6623°E
- Length: 42 km (26 mi)
- Basin size: 313 km^{2} (121 sq mi)
- Discharge
  - average: 0.9 m^{3}/s (32 cu ft/s) (at Melun)

Basin features
- Progression: Seine→ English Channel

The Almont (French pronunciation: [almɔ̃]) is a river in the Ile-de-France region of northern France. It traverses the department of Seine-et-Marne for a total length of 42 kilometres (26 mi), and empties into the Seine in Melun.

Its source is located between the towns of Nangis and Rampillon.
