= Châteaubleau =

- Commune
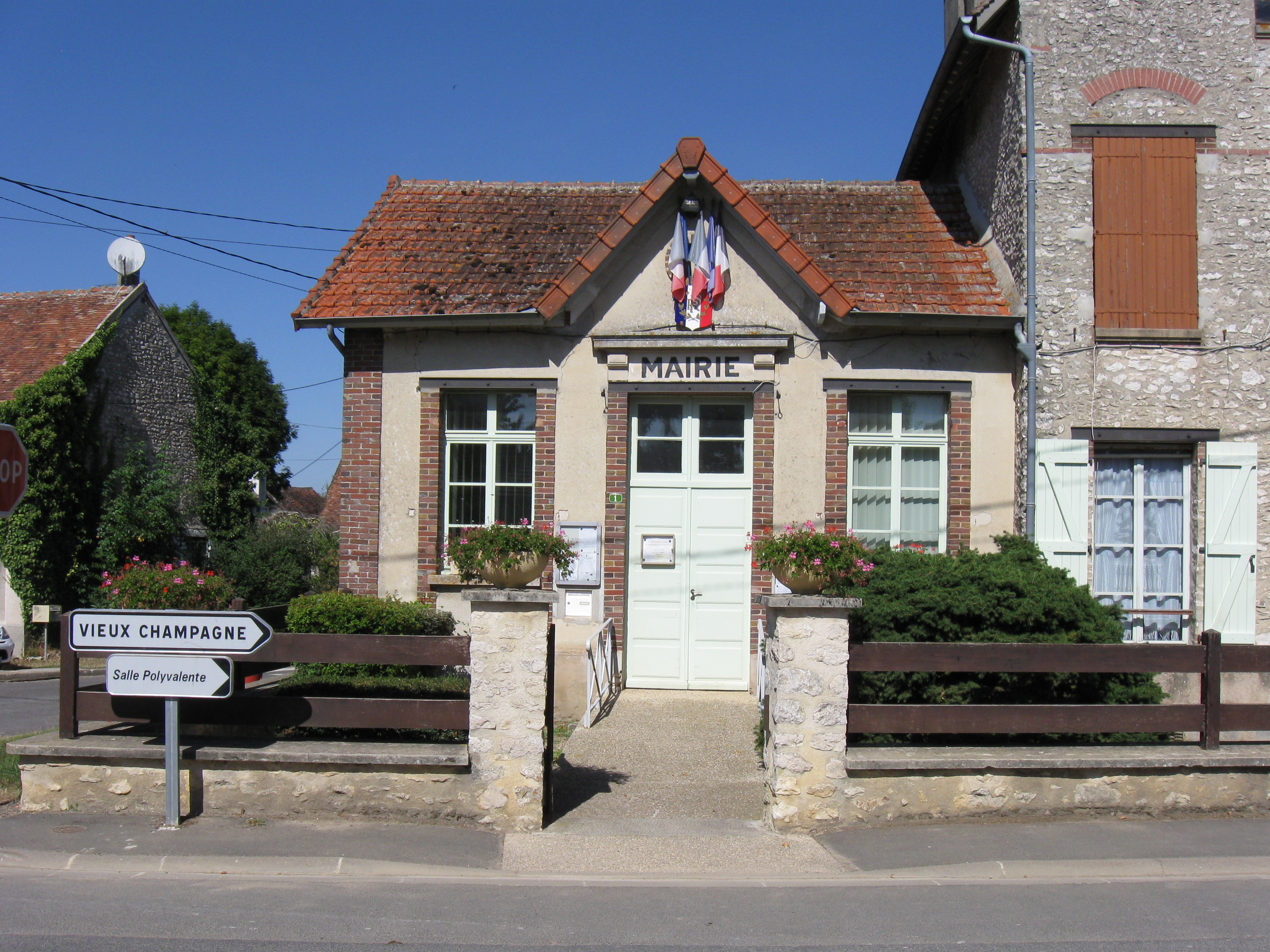
- The town hall in Châteaubleau
- Location of Châteaubleau
- Location within France Location within Île-de-France (region)
- Coordinates: 48°35′19″N 3°06′30″E
- Country: France
- Region: Île-de-France
- Department: Seine-et-Marne
- Arrondissement: Provins
- Canton: Nangis
- Intercommunality: CC Brie Nangissienne

Government
  - Mayor (2020–2026): Jean-Marc Desplats
- Area^{1}: 3.4 km^{2} (1.3 sq mi)
- Highest elevation: 150 m (490 ft)
- Lowest elevation: 120 m (390 ft)
- Population (2023): 363
  - Density: 110/km^{2} (280/sq mi)
- Time zone: UTC+01:00 (CET)
  - Summer (DST): UTC+02:00 (CEST)
- INSEE/Postal code: 77098 /77370
- ^{1} French Land Register data, which excludes lakes, ponds, glaciers > 1 km^{2} (0.386 sq mi or 247 acres) and river estuaries.

Châteaubleau (French pronunciation: [ʃatoblo]) is a commune in the Seine-et-Marne département in the Île-de-France région in north-central France.

It is located 16 km west of Provins and 9.5 km north east of Nangis. The inhabitants are called Castelblotins.

In the vicinity of the town, there are important Gaulo-Latin ruins, including houses, temples and a theater.

== Châteaubleau tile ==
An important Gaulish inscription inscribed on a tile was found in the area. It has been interpreted as a curse by Mees, but most scholars (Lambert, Stifter, Meid...) read it as a kind of wedding proposal.

1 ne mna liíumi beni ueíonna in corobo uido
2 neí anmanbe gniíou ape ni te me uelle íexsetesi
3 sue-regenia tu o quprinnopetamebissi íeteta
4 miíi íegumi. suante ueíommi petamassi papissone
5 sui-rexetesi íegiíinna anmanbe íeguisini
6 siaxsiou. beíiassu nebiti mot upiíummi ateri
7 xsi ín dore core. nuana íegumisini. beíassu se te
8 sue cluiou se dagisamo cele uiro íonoue
9 ííobiíe beíiassu se te rega íexstu mi sendi
10 me. se tingi papi-ssone beíiassu se te me tingi se
11 tingi beíiassu se te regarise íexstu mi sendi

=== Partial tentative translation, following Meid ===
1 I will bring no blame upon (any) woman. Desiring (you) as a wife, I will not openly
2 name names in any contracts, so that others may not accuse you of wanting me.

(Much of the rest of the text is unclear, but it seems to include a middle section which involves the suitor's purpose to speak to the beloved's family (sue-regenia, cf. Welsh rhieini“parents”), and specifically to make his intentions known (siaxsiou corresponding to Old Irish sïass-, future of saigid "seak") to her father (ateri-xsi) with hopes of leading to a marriage contract (in...cor).)

Lines 6 and 7: beíiassu “I would like to be it (your husband)!”

(The final section seems to express the wish for mutual consent to the marriage, including the following phrases:)

Lines 7 through 9: se te / sue cluiou (“if I hear you (say) so,”) se dagisamo cele, uiro íono ueííobííe (“(and) if you desire a very good husband, (and the) right man”) beíiassu (“(then) I would like to be it!”). se te rega (?)íexstu mi sendi ("(But) tell me this!")

Lines 10 through 11: me se tingi papi-ssone beíiassu (“If you will accept me as your husband, I shall be it!”) se te me tingi, se / tingi, beíiassu (“If you will accept me, if you (really) will, I shall be it!”)íexstu-mi sendi ("(But) you should tell me this”)

=== Notes ===
The opening ne mna(s) liyumi is literally "I do not blame women"; compare Old Irish líid “accuses, violates” and mna^{H} "women" (accusative plural), vs bein (acc. sg.) reflected in the next Gaulish form beni.

The phrase in corobo uido / neí anmanbe gniíou is literally “in contracts (compare Old Irish cor “contract”) publicly (= “wittingly” uido) I do not do (gniíou compare OIr. gniu "I make, do") it by name (anman- cf. OIr. ainm in the dative plural)."

The rest of line two, ape ni te me uelle íexsetesi is literally "“so that they (lit. “you”, plur.) could not say that you want me” with ape from *at-k^{w}e, and íexsetesi is a second person plural s-subjunctive from the root *iek- "speak" seen in Welsh ieith "speech." The sequence te me uelle is Latin, reflecting the mixed Latino-Gualish nature of the text.

== See also ==
- Communes of the Seine-et-Marne department
