= Quiers =

- Commune
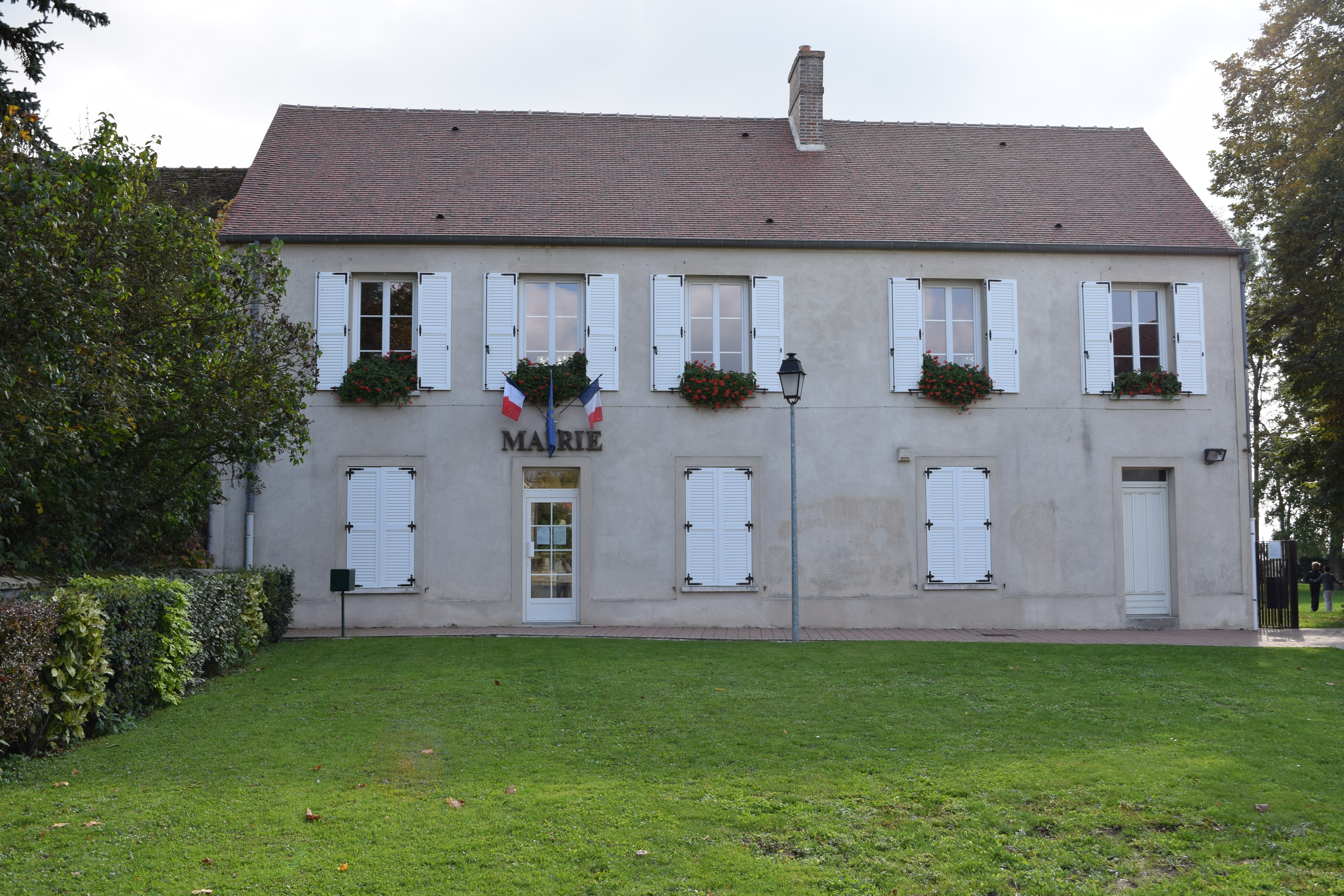
- The town hall in Quiers

- Coat of arms
- Location of Quiers
- Location within France Location within Île-de-France (region)
- Coordinates: 48°36′22″N 2°58′17″E
- Country: France
- Region: Île-de-France
- Department: Seine-et-Marne
- Arrondissement: Provins
- Canton: Nangis
- Intercommunality: CC Brie Nangissienne

Government
  - Mayor (2020–2026): Davy Brun
- Area^{1}: 11.91 km^{2} (4.60 sq mi)
- Highest elevation: 126 m (413 ft)
- Lowest elevation: 108 m (354 ft)
- Population (2023): 650
  - Density: 55/km^{2} (140/sq mi)
- Time zone: UTC+01:00 (CET)
  - Summer (DST): UTC+02:00 (CEST)
- INSEE/Postal code: 77381 /77720
- ^{1} French Land Register data, which excludes lakes, ponds, glaciers > 1 km^{2} (0.386 sq mi or 247 acres) and river estuaries.

Quiers (French pronunciation: [kjɛʁ]) is a commune in the Seine-et-Marne department in the Île-de-France region in north-central France.

== Demographics ==
The inhabitants are called Quierçois.

== See also ==
- Communes of the Seine-et-Marne department
