= Aubepierre-Ozouer-le-Repos =

- Commune
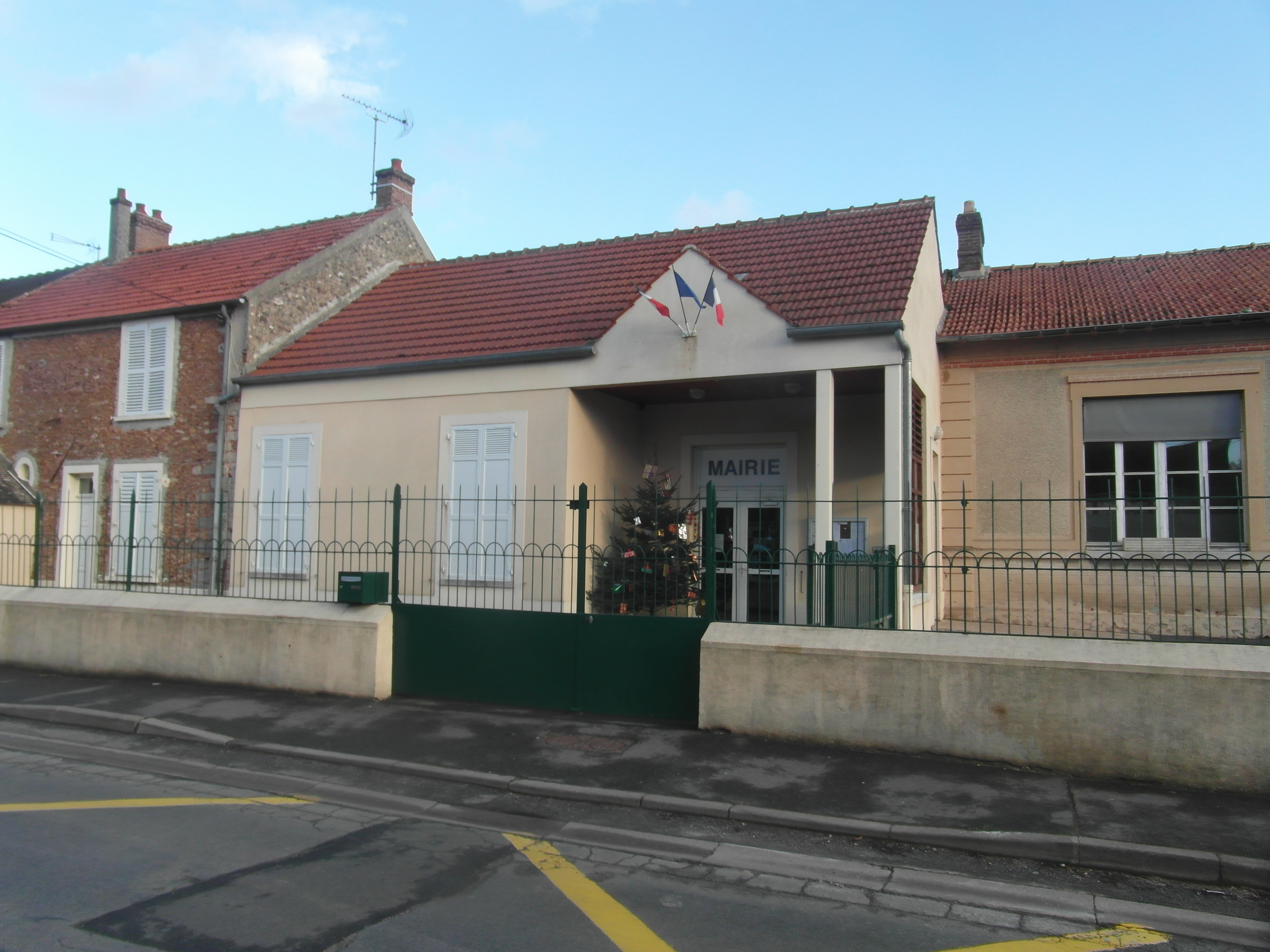
- The town hall in Aubepierre-Ozouer-le-Repos
- Location of Aubepierre-Ozouer-le-Repos
- Location within France Location within Île-de-France (region)
- Coordinates: 48°37′54″N 2°53′20″E
- Country: France
- Region: Île-de-France
- Department: Seine-et-Marne
- Arrondissement: Provins
- Canton: Nangis
- Intercommunality: CC Brie Nangissienne

Government
  - Mayor (2020–2026): Brigitte Jacquemot
- Area^{1}: 26.24 km^{2} (10.13 sq mi)
- Highest elevation: 112 m (367 ft)
- Lowest elevation: 79 m (259 ft)
- Population (2023): 984
  - Density: 37.5/km^{2} (97.1/sq mi)
- Time zone: UTC+01:00 (CET)
  - Summer (DST): UTC+02:00 (CEST)
- INSEE/Postal code: 77010 /77720
- ^{1} French Land Register data, which excludes lakes, ponds, glaciers > 1 km^{2} (0.386 sq mi or 247 acres) and river estuaries.

Aubepierre-Ozouer-le-Repos is a commune in the Seine-et-Marne department in the Île-de-France region in north-central France. The inhabitants are called Albapétruciens.

== See also ==
- Communes of the Seine-et-Marne department
