= Fontains =

- Commune
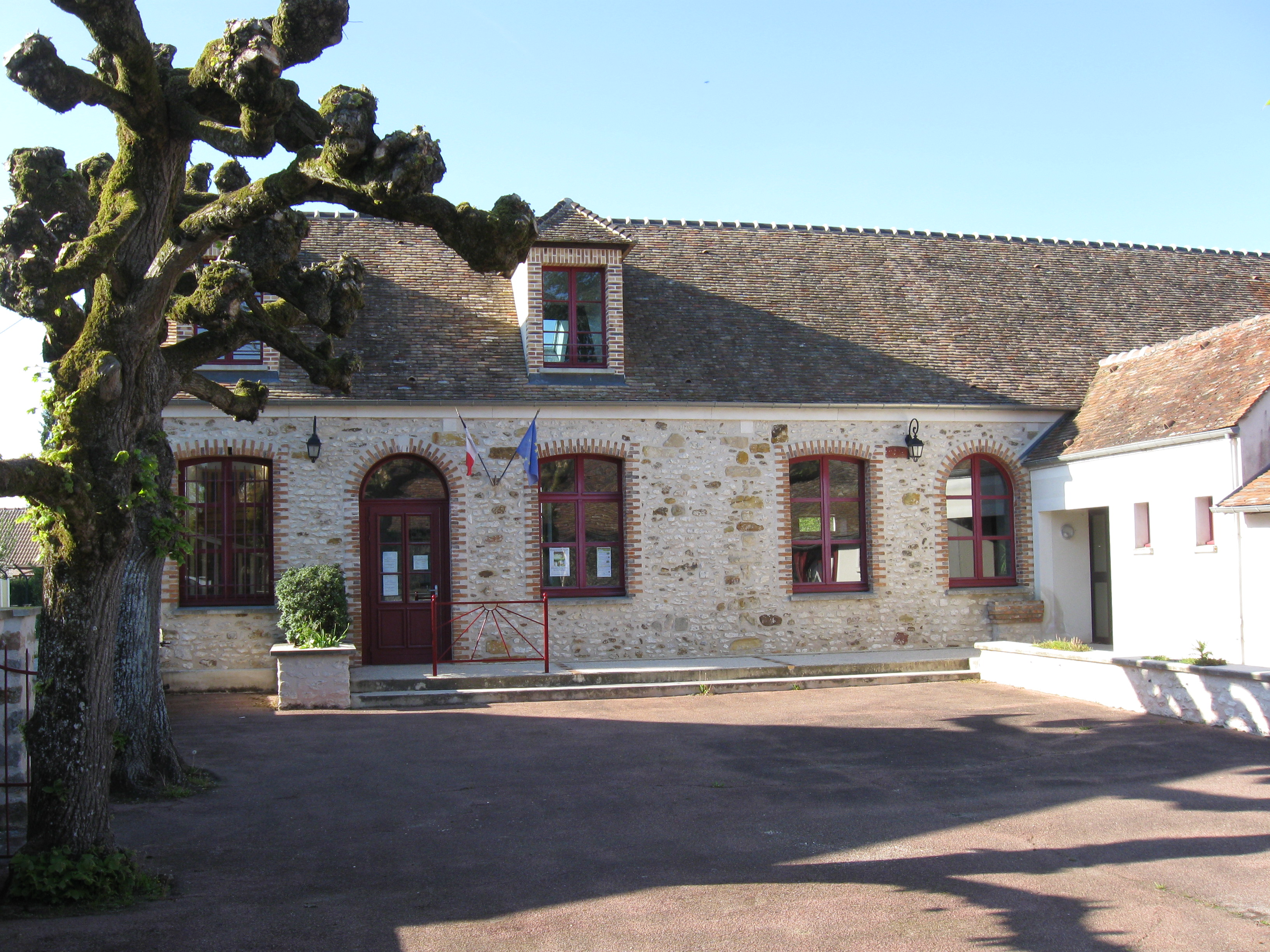
- The town hall in Fontains
- Location of Fontains
- Location within France Location within Île-de-France (region)
- Coordinates: 48°31′33″N 3°00′10″E
- Country: France
- Region: Île-de-France
- Department: Seine-et-Marne
- Arrondissement: Provins
- Canton: Nangis
- Intercommunality: CC Brie Nangissienne

Government
  - Mayor (2020–2026): Didier Baldy
- Area^{1}: 14.36 km^{2} (5.54 sq mi)
- Highest elevation: 139 m (456 ft)
- Lowest elevation: 102 m (335 ft)
- Population (2023): 256
  - Density: 17.8/km^{2} (46.2/sq mi)
- Time zone: UTC+01:00 (CET)
  - Summer (DST): UTC+02:00 (CEST)
- INSEE/Postal code: 77190 /77370
- ^{1} French Land Register data, which excludes lakes, ponds, glaciers > 1 km^{2} (0.386 sq mi or 247 acres) and river estuaries.

Fontains is a commune in the Seine-et-Marne department in the Île-de-France region in north-central France.

== Demographics ==
Inhabitants of Fontains are called Fontenois.

== See also ==
- Communes of the Seine-et-Marne department
