= Vieux-Champagne =

- Commune
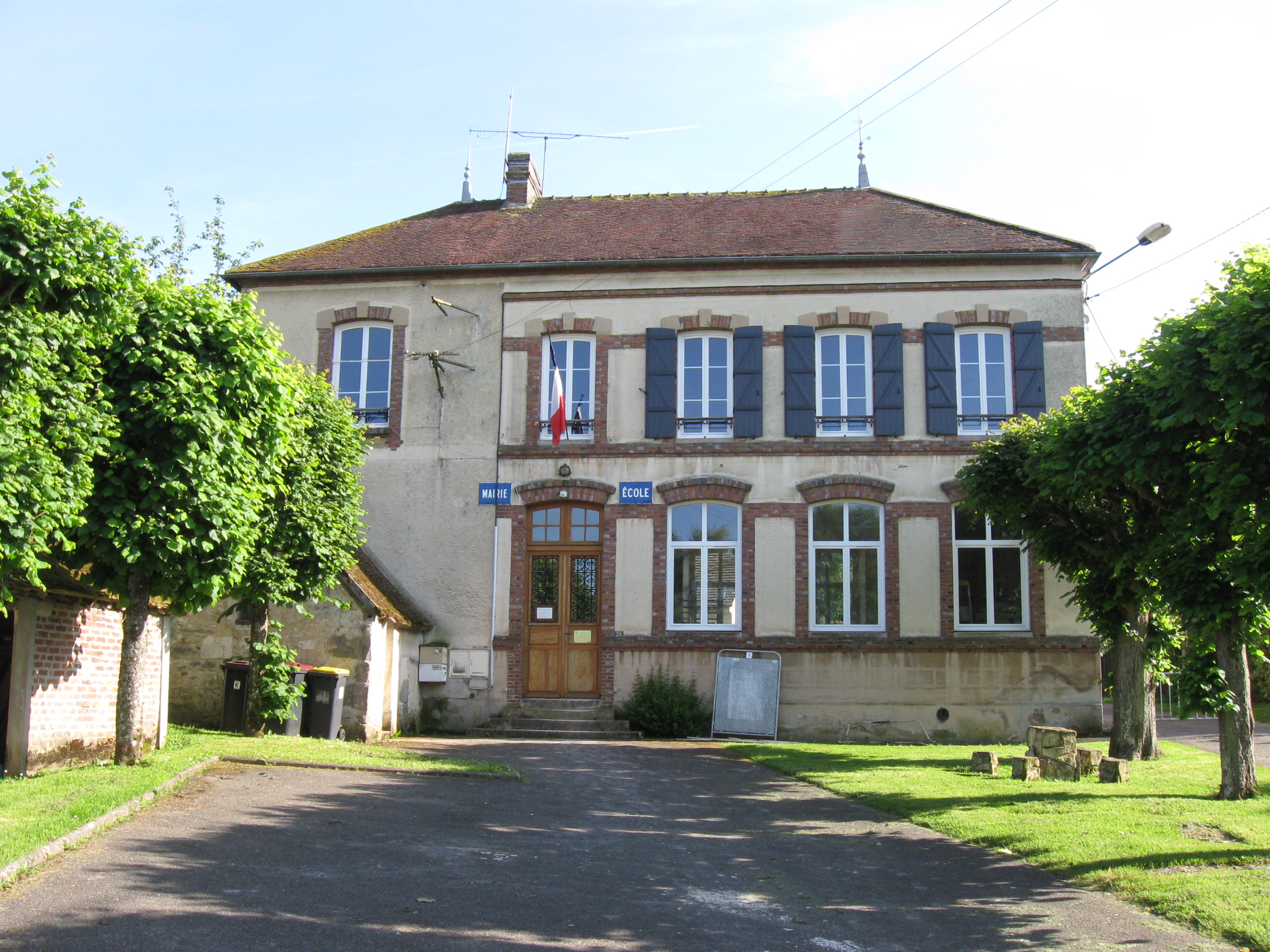
- The town hall in Vieux-Champagne
- Location of Vieux-Champagne
- Location within France Location within Île-de-France (region)
- Coordinates: 48°34′48″N 3°08′19″E
- Country: France
- Region: Île-de-France
- Department: Seine-et-Marne
- Arrondissement: Provins
- Canton: Nangis
- Intercommunality: La Brie Nangissienne

Government
  - Mayor (2020–2026): Nadia Medjani
- Area^{1}: 8.89 km^{2} (3.43 sq mi)
- Highest elevation: 162 m (531 ft)
- Lowest elevation: 126 m (413 ft)
- Population (2023): 192
  - Density: 21.6/km^{2} (55.9/sq mi)
- Time zone: UTC+01:00 (CET)
  - Summer (DST): UTC+02:00 (CEST)
- INSEE/Postal code: 77496 /77370
- ^{1} French Land Register data, which excludes lakes, ponds, glaciers > 1 km^{2} (0.386 sq mi or 247 acres) and river estuaries.

Vieux-Champagne (French pronunciation: [vjø ʃɑ̃paɲ]) is a commune in the Seine-et-Marne department in the Île-de-France region in north-central France.

== Demographics ==
Inhabitants of Vieux-Champagne are called Vieux-champenois.

== See also ==
- Communes of the Seine-et-Marne department
