= Communauté de communes La Brie Nangissienne =

Federation of municipalities in Île-de-France, France

Coordinates: 48.56°N 3.01°E

La Brie Nangissienne
- Communauté de communes
- Country: France
- Region: Île-de-France
- Department: Seine-et-Marne
- No. of communes: {{{nbcomm}}}
- Established: January 2006

Government
  - President: Yannick Guillo
- Area: 294.1 km^{2} (113.6 sq mi)
- Population (2018): 27,809
  - Density: 94.56/km^{2} (244.9/sq mi)

The Communauté de communes La Brie Nangissienne is a federation of municipalities (communauté de communes) in the Seine-et-Marne département and in the Île-de-France région of France. Its seat is the town Nangis. Its area is 294.1 km^{2}, and its population was 27,809 in 2018.

== Composition ==
The communauté de communes consists of the following 20 communes:

1. Aubepierre-Ozouer-le-Repos
2. Bréau
3. La Chapelle-Gauthier
4. La Chapelle-Rablais
5. Châteaubleau
6. Clos-Fontaine
7. La Croix-en-Brie
8. Fontains
9. Fontenailles
10. Gastins
11. Grandpuits-Bailly-Carrois
12. Mormant
13. Nangis
14. Quiers
15. Rampillon
16. Saint-Just-en-Brie
17. Saint-Ouen-en-Brie
18. Vanvillé
19. Verneuil-l'Étang
20. Vieux-Champagne

== See also ==
- Communes of the Seine-et-Marne department
