= Bréau =

- Commune
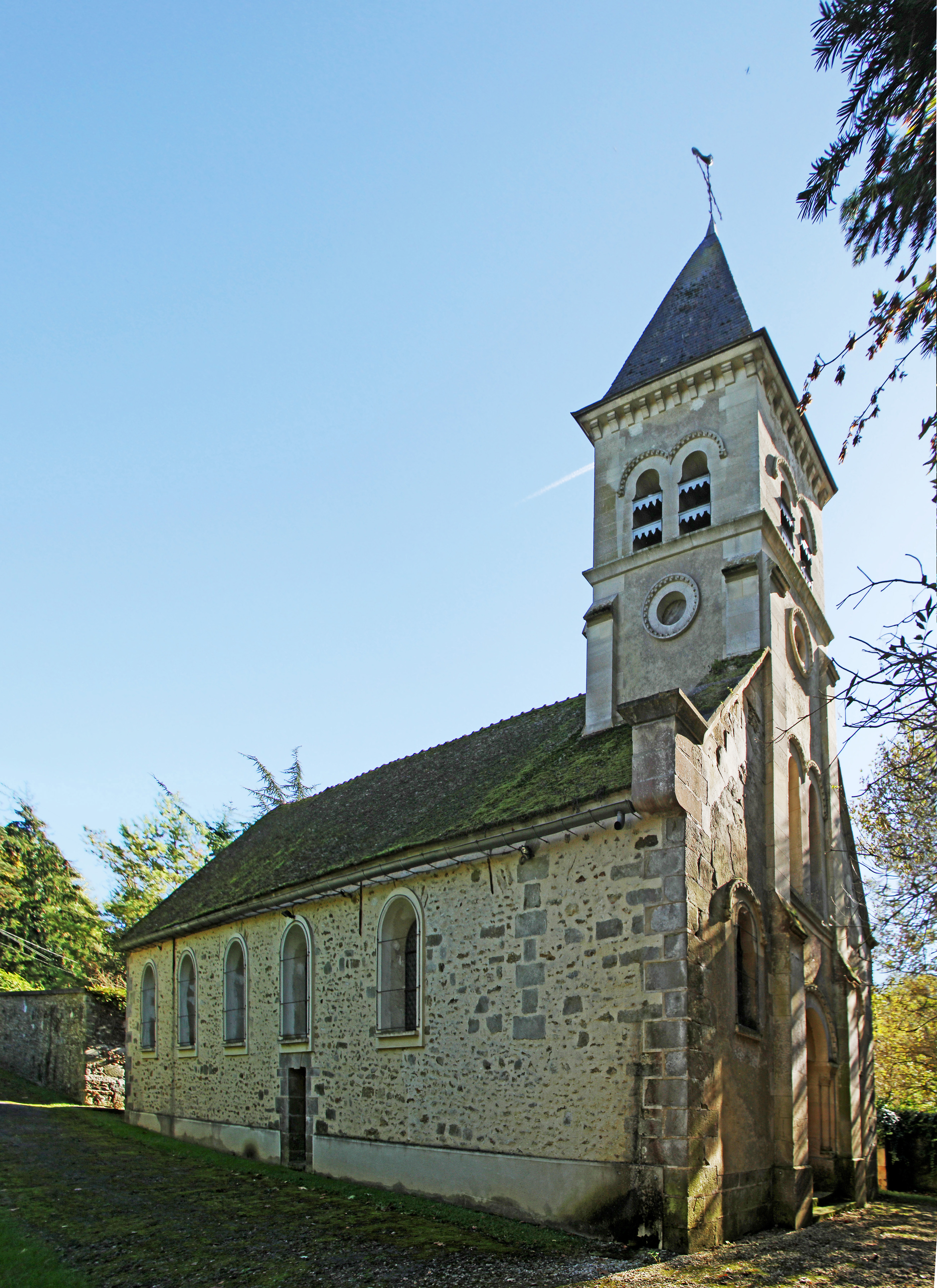
- The church in Bréau
- Location of Bréau
- Location within France Location within Île-de-France (region)
- Coordinates: 48°33′44″N 2°52′45″E
- Country: France
- Region: Île-de-France
- Department: Seine-et-Marne
- Arrondissement: Provins
- Canton: Nangis
- Intercommunality: CC Brie Nangissienne

Government
  - Mayor (2020–2026): Alain Thibaud
- Area^{1}: 1.35 km^{2} (0.52 sq mi)
- Highest elevation: 113 m (371 ft)
- Lowest elevation: 87 m (285 ft)
- Population (2023): 384
  - Density: 284/km^{2} (737/sq mi)
- Time zone: UTC+01:00 (CET)
  - Summer (DST): UTC+02:00 (CEST)
- INSEE/Postal code: 77052 /77720
- ^{1} French Land Register data, which excludes lakes, ponds, glaciers > 1 km^{2} (0.386 sq mi or 247 acres) and river estuaries.

Bréau (French pronunciation: [bʁeo]) is a commune in the Seine-et-Marne department in the Île-de-France region in north-central France.

== Demographics ==
The inhabitants are called Bréautins.

== See also ==
- Communes of the Seine-et-Marne department
