= Light railway =

Type of low cost railway

A light railway is a railway built at lower costs and to lower standards than typical "heavy rail": it uses lighter-weight track, and may have more steep gradients and tight curves to reduce civil engineering costs. These lighter standards allow lower costs of operation, at the price of lower vehicle capacity.

== Narrow gauge ==
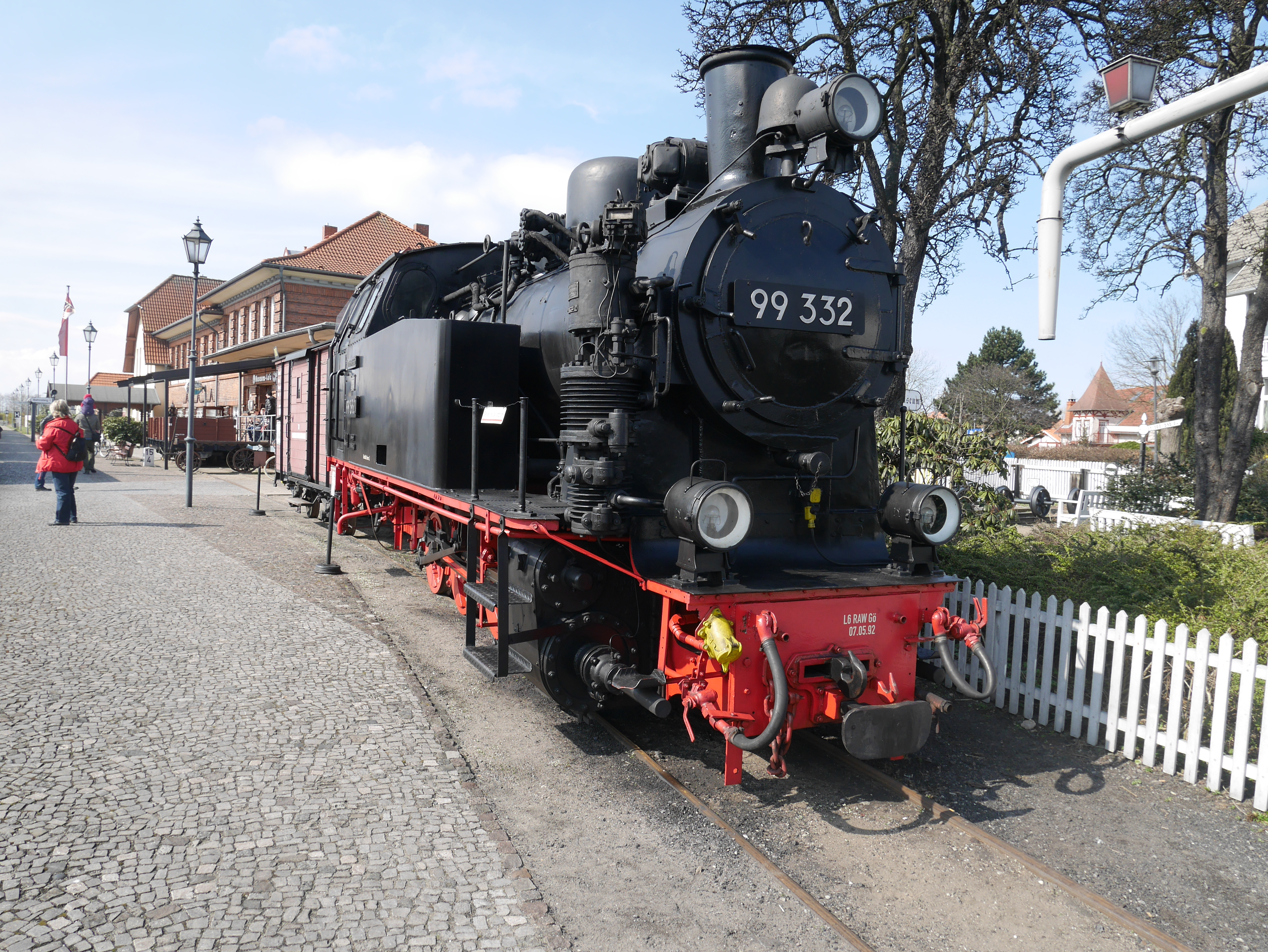
Restored Molli railway at Kühlungsborn, Mecklenburg, Germany (900 mm / 2 ft 11 7/16 in)

The precise meaning of the term "light railway" varies by geography and context.

In countries where a single standard gauge is dominant, the term light railway does not imply a narrow gauge railway. Most narrow gauge railways operate as light railways, but not all light railways need be narrow gauge. (Note: This does not apply to places such as southern Africa, where a system of extremely large 3 ft 6 in (1,067 mm) mainline railways developed.) After Spooner's development of steam haulage for narrow gauge railways, the prevailing view was that the gauge should be tailored according to the traffic: "The nearer the machine is apportioned to the work it has to do the cheaper will that work be done."

From the 1890s, it was recognised that cost savings could also be made in the construction and operation of a standard gauge railway: "light axle-loads and low speeds, not gauge, are the first condition of cheap construction and economical working. Gauge is quite a secondary factor." Break of gauge now became an important factor, and there was much concern over whether this would become an additional cost for the transshipment of goods, or whether this was over-emphasised compared to the amount of warehousing and handling needed anyway. The Irish railway system in particular became a good example of a broad gauge main line system with many independent narrow gauge, 3 ft (914 mm), light railway feeder branch lines.

== United States ==
In the United States, "light railway" generally refers to an urban or interurban rail system, which historically would correspond to a streetcar network. The distinct term light rail was introduced in the 1970s to describe a form of urban rail public transportation that has a lower capacity and lower speed than a heavy rail or metro system, but which generally operates in exclusive rights-of-way, in contrast with streetcar systems which operate in shared road traffic with automobiles. Urban sprawl combined with higher fuel prices has caused an increase in popularity of these light rail systems in recent decades.

== United Kingdom ==
In the United Kingdom "light railway" refers in its strictest sense to a railway built or operated under the Light Railways Act 1896 (59 & 60 Vict. c. 48). That act, though, gives only a vague description; a better one is found from John Charles MacKay in the same year: "A light railway is one constructed with lighter rails and structures, running at a slower speed, with poorer accommodation for passengers and less facility for freight. It can be worked with less stringent standards of signalling and safety practice. It is a cheap railway and a second class of railway." These terms are not pejorative, they simply recognise that the standards of main-line heavy railways are not needed in all situations. Their great advantage under UK law was that they avoided the need for an expensive act of Parliament before each new line; they only required a much simpler light railway order within the terms of the act.

The term is also used more generally of any lightly built railway with limited traffic, often controlled locally and running unusual or older rolling stock. A light railway is properly distinct from a tramway which operates under differing rules and may share a road. The term "light railway" is generally used in a positive manner.

Perhaps the most well-known caricature of a light railway is the film The Titfield Thunderbolt, made in 1953 as many of the light railways and other small branch lines were being closed. Despite the great public affection for these railways, very few were financially successful. Colonel H.F. Stephens was pivotal in the light railway world, and tried many techniques to make light railways pay, introducing some of the earliest railcars and also experimenting with a rail lorry built out of an old Model T Ford. Nevertheless, most light railways never made much money, and by the 1930s they were being driven out of business by the motor car. Although World War II resulted in a brief increase in the importance of these railways, very few lasted beyond the early 1950s. Those that survive today are generally heritage railways.

== Australia ==
Queensland adopted a narrow gauge of 1,067 mm (3 ft 6 in) in order to make construction of lines lighter and thus cheaper, though this initiated a break-of-gauge with other states. The cost savings were due to light rails, low axleloads and low speeds as much as due to the gauge.

Tasmania, Western Australia and South Australia followed suit with the narrow gauge to reduce costs, though South Australia ended up with an inefficient two-gauge system which negated some of the supposed cost savings of the narrow gauge. New South Wales resisted calls to introduce narrow gauge, but did adopt pioneer lines with 30 kg/m (60.5 lb/yd) rails to reduce costs without the need for breaks-of-gauge.

There were a significant number of small and isolated mining and timber railway built to a variety of gauges and improvised standards.

There are still a large number of sugar cane tramways built to a common 610 mm (2 ft) gauge, and sharing research and development into advanced features such as concrete sleepers, tamping machines, remotely controlled brake vans, and the like. There is little through traffic with mainline railways so that break-of-gauge is not a problem.

The Iron Knob Railway was legally a "tramway", but operated 2,000-ton iron ore trams which were heavier than most railways.

== Japan ==
Also in Japan, originally, "light railway" refers to a railway built or operated under the Light Railways Act enforced in 1909. The act in Japan also though gives only a vague description; the purpose of the act is for building railways easily with less stringent standards and at low cost.

The light railway concept in Japan is therefore similar to the UK and other countries. Many light railways were built for passengers or as military, industrial or forest railways in Japan, and in Japan's colonies in Taiwan, Korea, Manchuria, Sakhalin and Micronesia. Some light railways were destroyed during World War II, especially in Okinawa. By the 1970s, most light railways in Japan had been driven out of business by the motor car. Some of the remaining lines survive in passenger service, and others have been restored as heritage railways.

== Taiwan ==
Taiwanese push car railways used handcars on 762mm gauge rails to transport sugarcanes of the Taiwan Sugar Corporation to the mainline railways of the Taiwan Railway Administration or the processing plants of the Taiwan Sugar Cooperation for further production to turn the sugarcane to fine sugar.

== Industrial railways ==
Many industrial railways were built to light railway standards. These may be of light and small construction, although the wagons carrying molten-steel in a steelworks can be several hundred tonnes in weight.

=== Panama ===
The Panama Canal construction used a heavy network of 5 ft (1,524 mm) temporary railways in its construction to move vast quantities of soil from the excavations to the dams that were constructed.

== Military railways ==
Light railways have been used in several wars, especially before the advent of the combustion engine and motor car. These have often connect depots some distance behind the front line with the front lines themselves. Some armies have Divisions of Engineers trained to operate trains. Sometimes they operate a branch line of their own so that they can practise track and bridge building (and demolition) without disturbing trains on the main line.

- Trench railways
- Feldbahn
- Heeresfeldbahn - German and Austrian military railways
- War Department Light Railways
- Longmoor Military Railway - built by the Royal Engineers in order to train on railway operations on it. It closed in 1969.
- Central Asian Military railway

== See also ==
- Forest railway
- Minimum-gauge railway
- Tramway from Verneuil-l'Étang to Melun
- Tramway from Sablonnières to Bray-sur-Seine
