= Vanvillé =

- Commune
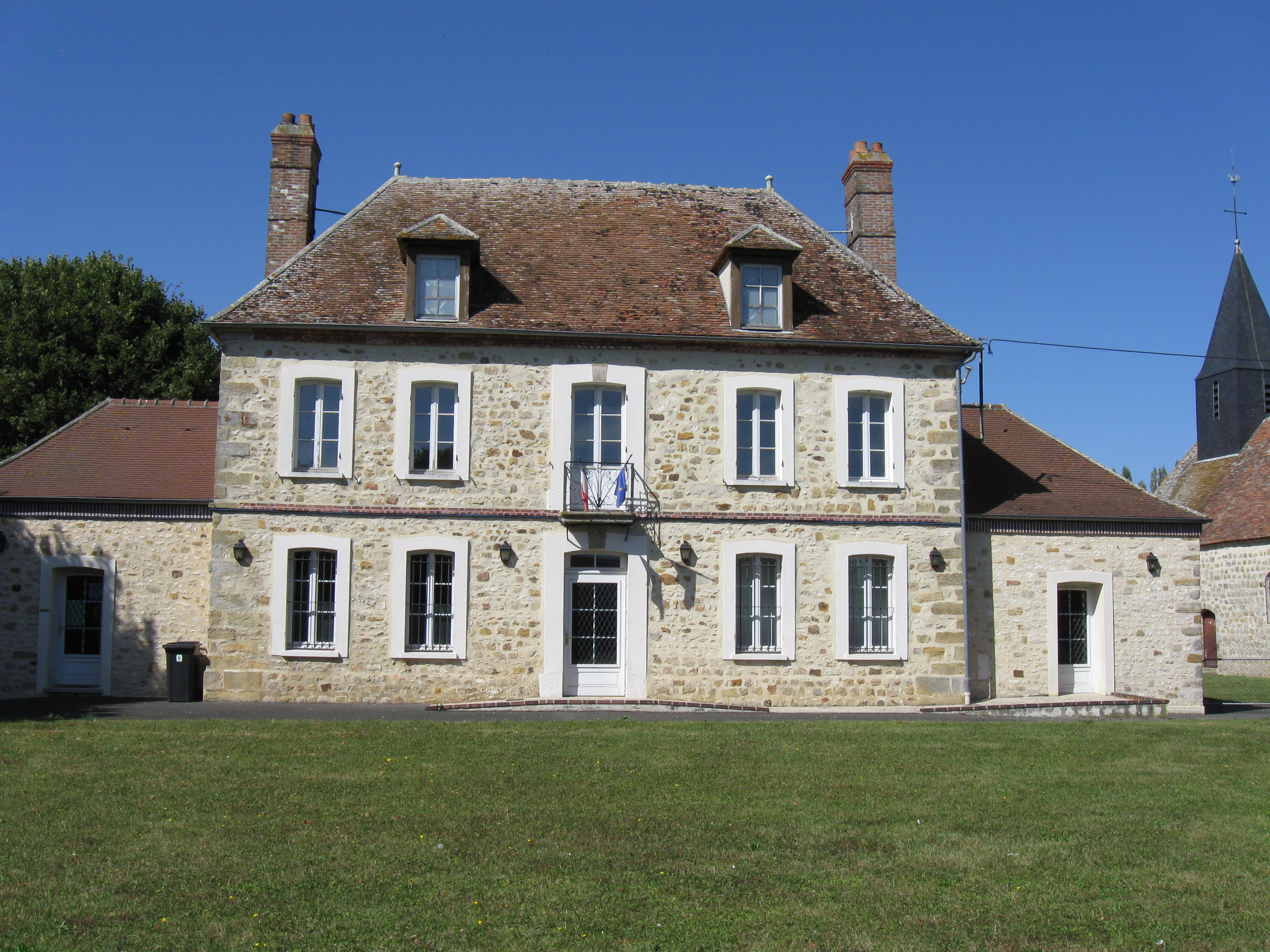
- The town hall in Vanvillé

- Coat of arms
- Location of Vanvillé
- Location within France Location within Île-de-France (region)
- Coordinates: 48°33′22″N 3°06′28″E
- Country: France
- Region: Île-de-France
- Department: Seine-et-Marne
- Arrondissement: Provins
- Canton: Nangis
- Intercommunality: La Brie Nangissienne

Government
  - Mayor (2020–2026): Jean-Luc Labatut
- Area^{1}: 7.53 km^{2} (2.91 sq mi)
- Highest elevation: 153 m (502 ft)
- Lowest elevation: 134 m (440 ft)
- Population (2023): 197
  - Density: 26.2/km^{2} (67.8/sq mi)
- Time zone: UTC+01:00 (CET)
  - Summer (DST): UTC+02:00 (CEST)
- INSEE/Postal code: 77481 /77370
- ^{1} French Land Register data, which excludes lakes, ponds, glaciers > 1 km^{2} (0.386 sq mi or 247 acres) and river estuaries.

Vanvillé is a commune in the Seine-et-Marne department in the Île-de-France region in north-central France.

== Demographics ==
Inhabitants of Vanvillé are called Vanvilléens.

== See also ==
- Communes of the Seine-et-Marne department
