= Fontenailles, Seine-et-Marne =

Fontenailles
- Commune
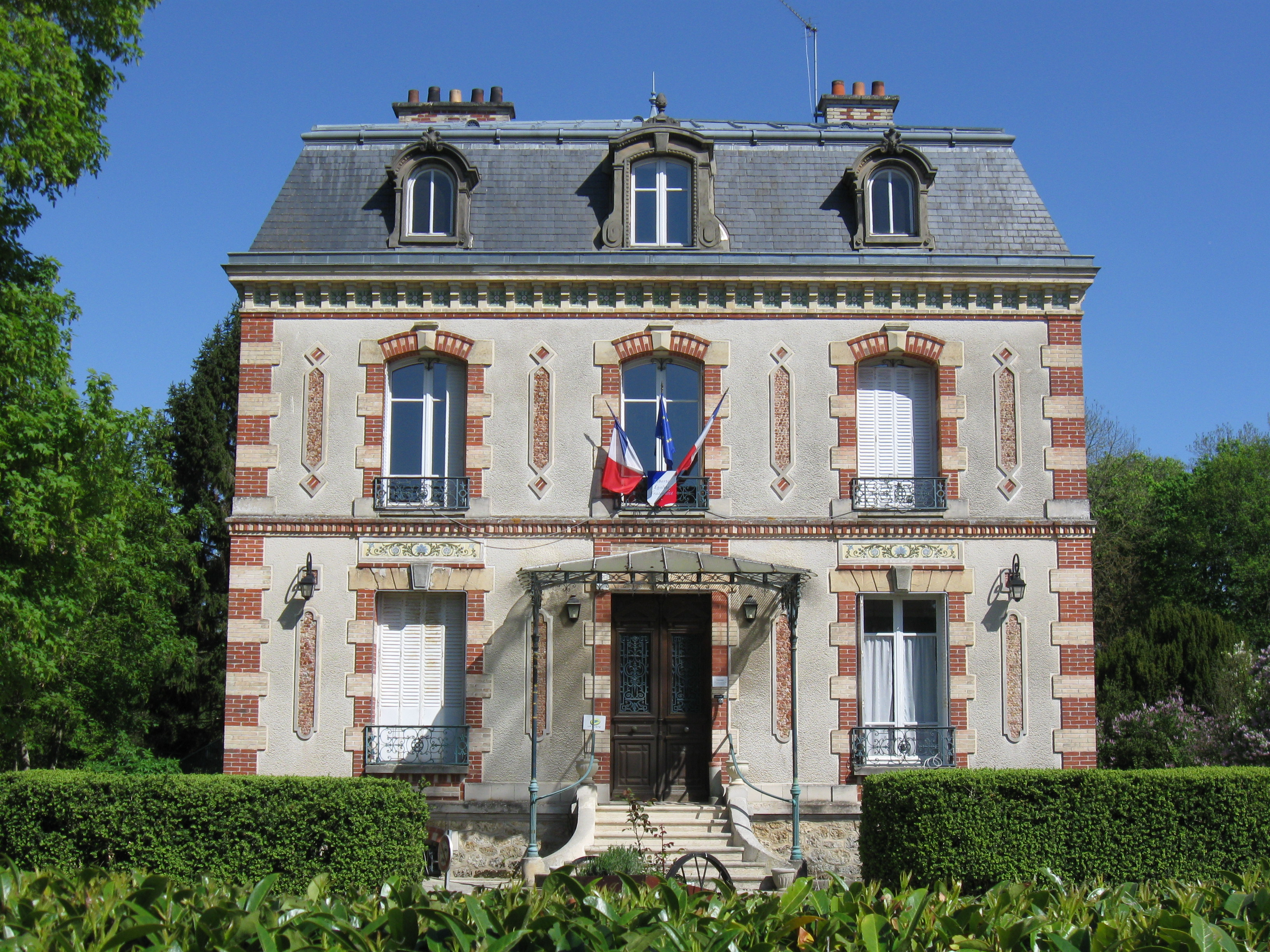
- Town hall of Fontenailles

- Coat of arms
- Location of Fontenailles
- Location within France Location within Île-de-France (region)
- Coordinates: 48°33′21″N 2°57′10″E
- Country: France
- Region: Île-de-France
- Department: Seine-et-Marne
- Arrondissement: Provins
- Canton: Nangis
- Intercommunality: CC Brie Nangissienne

Government
  - Mayor (2020–2026): Ghislaine Harscoet
- Area^{1}: 27.44 km^{2} (10.59 sq mi)
- Highest elevation: 130 m (430 ft)
- Lowest elevation: 92 m (302 ft)
- Population (2023): 1,109
  - Density: 40.42/km^{2} (104.7/sq mi)
- Time zone: UTC+01:00 (CET)
  - Summer (DST): UTC+02:00 (CEST)
- INSEE/Postal code: 77191 /77370
- ^{1} French Land Register data, which excludes lakes, ponds, glaciers > 1 km^{2} (0.386 sq mi or 247 acres) and river estuaries.

Fontenailles (French pronunciation: [fɔ̃tnaj]) is a commune in the Seine-et-Marne department in the Île-de-France region in north-central France.

== Demographics ==
Inhabitants of Fontenailles are called Fontenaillais.

== See also ==
- Communes of the Seine-et-Marne department
