= Saint-Ouen-en-Brie =

- Commune
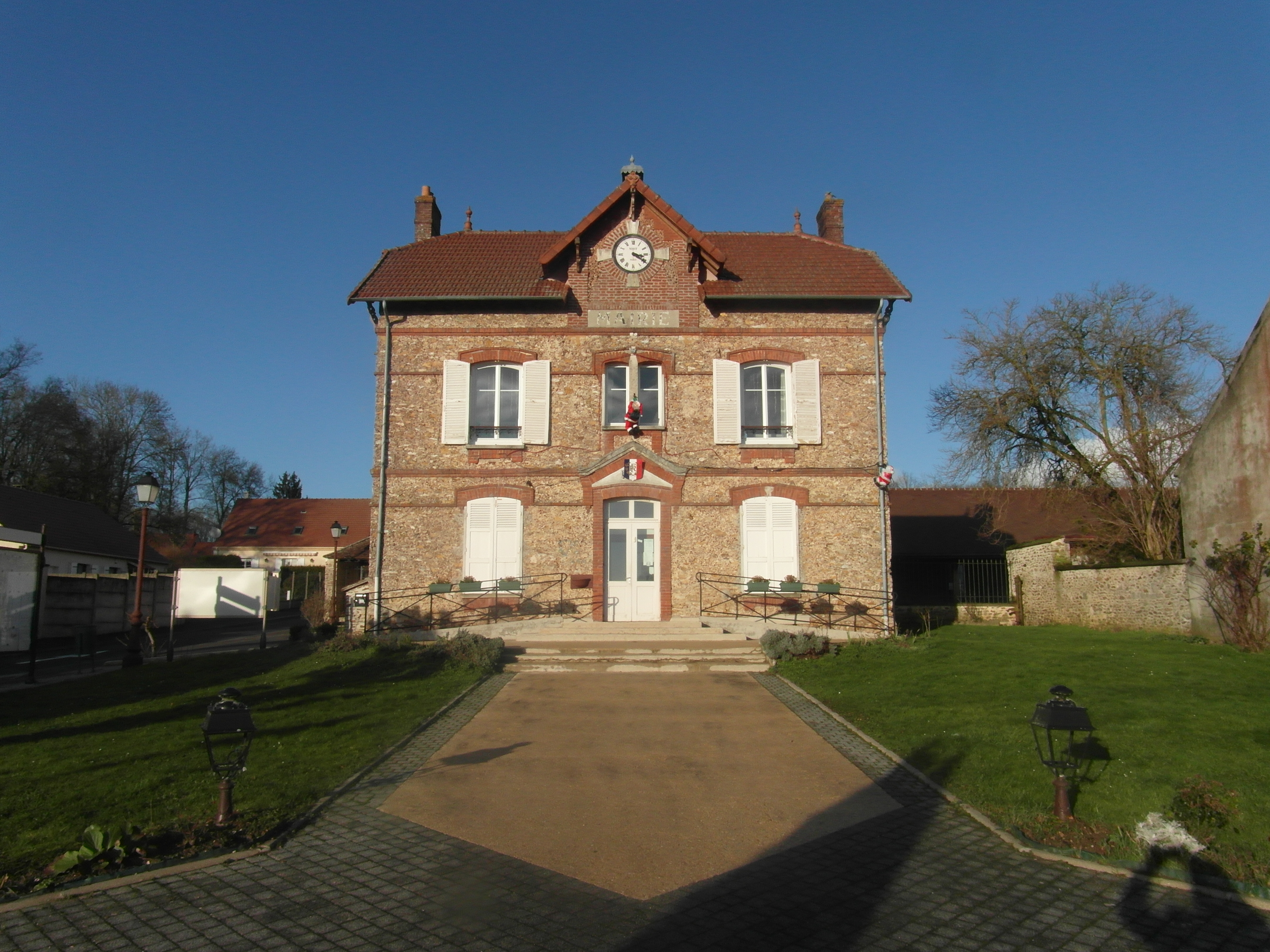
- The town hall in Saint-Ouen-en-Brie
- Location of Saint-Ouen-en-Brie
- Location within France Location within Île-de-France (region)
- Coordinates: 48°33′30″N 2°55′08″E
- Country: France
- Region: Île-de-France
- Department: Seine-et-Marne
- Arrondissement: Provins
- Canton: Nangis
- Intercommunality: La Brie Nangissienne

Government
  - Mayor (2020–2026): Yannick Guillo
- Area^{1}: 5.69 km^{2} (2.20 sq mi)
- Highest elevation: 124 m (407 ft)
- Lowest elevation: 91 m (299 ft)
- Population (2023): 837
  - Density: 147/km^{2} (381/sq mi)
- Time zone: UTC+01:00 (CET)
  - Summer (DST): UTC+02:00 (CEST)
- INSEE/Postal code: 77428 /77720
- ^{1} French Land Register data, which excludes lakes, ponds, glaciers > 1 km^{2} (0.386 sq mi or 247 acres) and river estuaries.

Saint-Ouen-en-Brie (French pronunciation: [sɛ̃.t‿wɛ̃ ɑ̃ bʁi], literally Saint-Ouen in Brie) is a commune in the Seine-et-Marne department in the Île-de-France region in north-central France.

== Demographics ==
Inhabitants of Saint-Ouen-en-Brie are called Audoniens.

== See also ==
- Communes of the Seine-et-Marne department
