= La Chapelle-Gauthier, Seine-et-Marne =

La Chapelle-Gauthier
- Commune
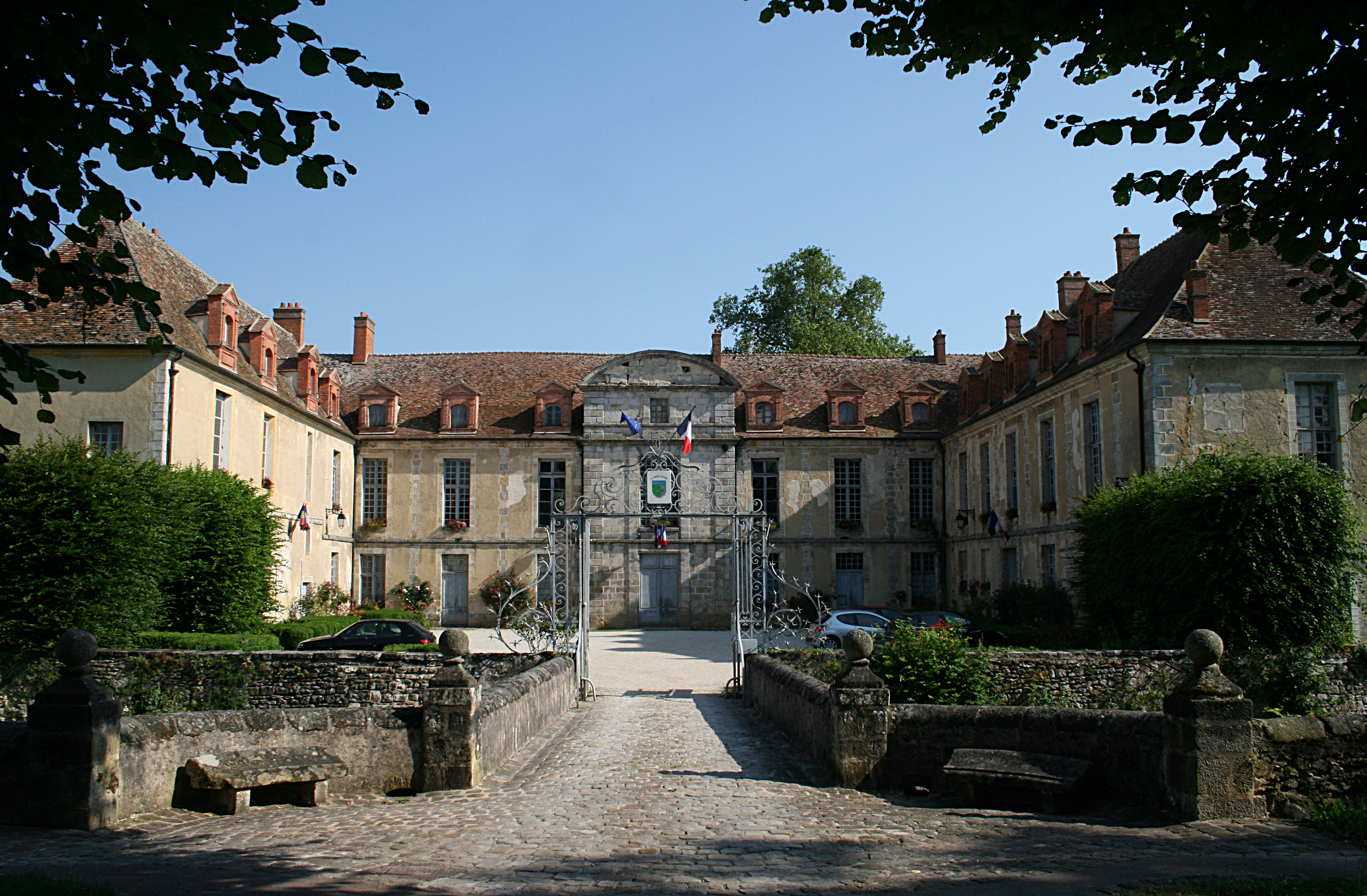
- The chateau in La Chapelle-Gauthier

- Coat of arms
- Location of La Chapelle-Gauthier
- Location within France Location within Île-de-France (region)
- Coordinates: 48°33′02″N 2°54′00″E
- Country: France
- Region: Île-de-France
- Department: Seine-et-Marne
- Arrondissement: Provins
- Canton: Nangis
- Intercommunality: CC Brie Nangissienne

Government
  - Mayor (2020–2026): Farid Mebarki
- Area^{1}: 17.36 km^{2} (6.70 sq mi)
- Highest elevation: 129 m (423 ft)
- Lowest elevation: 88 m (289 ft)
- Population (2023): 1,400
  - Density: 81/km^{2} (210/sq mi)
- Time zone: UTC+01:00 (CET)
  - Summer (DST): UTC+02:00 (CEST)
- INSEE/Postal code: 77086 /77720
- ^{1} French Land Register data, which excludes lakes, ponds, glaciers > 1 km^{2} (0.386 sq mi or 247 acres) and river estuaries.

La Chapelle-Gauthier (French pronunciation: [la ʃapɛl ɡotje]) is a commune in the Seine-et-Marne department in the Île-de-France region in north-central France.

== Demographics ==
The inhabitants are called Chapellois.

== Films ==
The 2019 French film Portrait of a Lady on Fire was filmed in part in La Chapelle-Gauthier, Seine-et-Marne.

== See also ==
- Communes of the Seine-et-Marne department
