= Clos-Fontaine =

- Commune
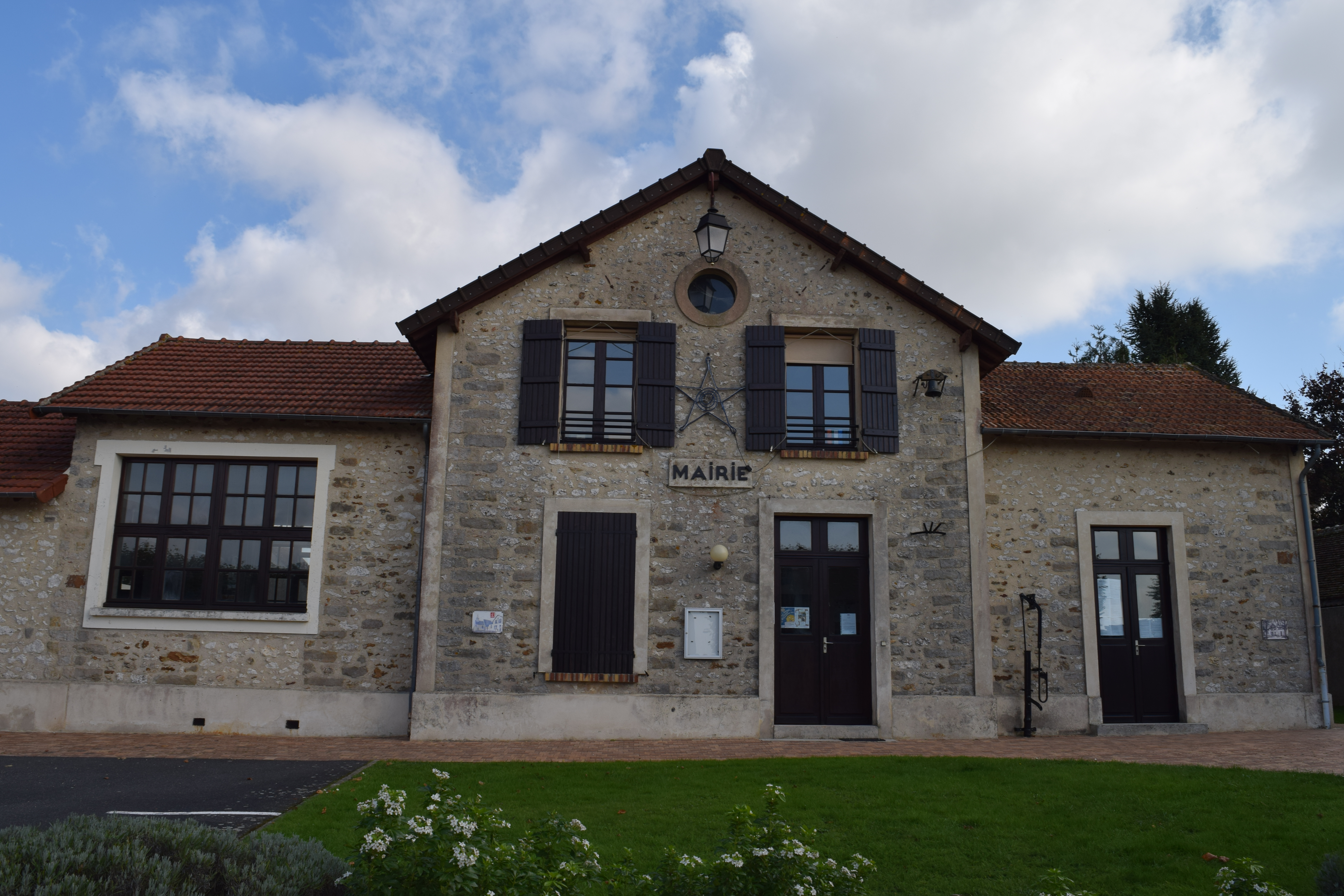
- The town hall in Clos-Fontaine

- Coat of arms
- Location of Clos-Fontaine
- Location within France Location within Île-de-France (region)
- Coordinates: 48°36′28″N 3°01′01″E
- Country: France
- Region: Île-de-France
- Department: Seine-et-Marne
- Arrondissement: Provins
- Canton: Nangis
- Intercommunality: CC Brie Nangissienne

Government
  - Mayor (2020–2026): Gilbert Leconte
- Area^{1}: 5.97 km^{2} (2.31 sq mi)
- Highest elevation: 134 m (440 ft)
- Lowest elevation: 103 m (338 ft)
- Population (2023): 244
  - Density: 40.9/km^{2} (106/sq mi)
- Time zone: UTC+01:00 (CET)
  - Summer (DST): UTC+02:00 (CEST)
- INSEE/Postal code: 77119 /77370
- ^{1} French Land Register data, which excludes lakes, ponds, glaciers > 1 km^{2} (0.386 sq mi or 247 acres) and river estuaries.

Clos-Fontaine (French pronunciation: [klo fɔ̃tɛn]) is a commune in the Seine-et-Marne department in the Île-de-France region in north-central France.

== Demographics ==
The inhabitants are called Clos-Fontainois.

== See also ==
- Communes of the Seine-et-Marne department
