= Grandpuits-Bailly-Carrois =

- Commune
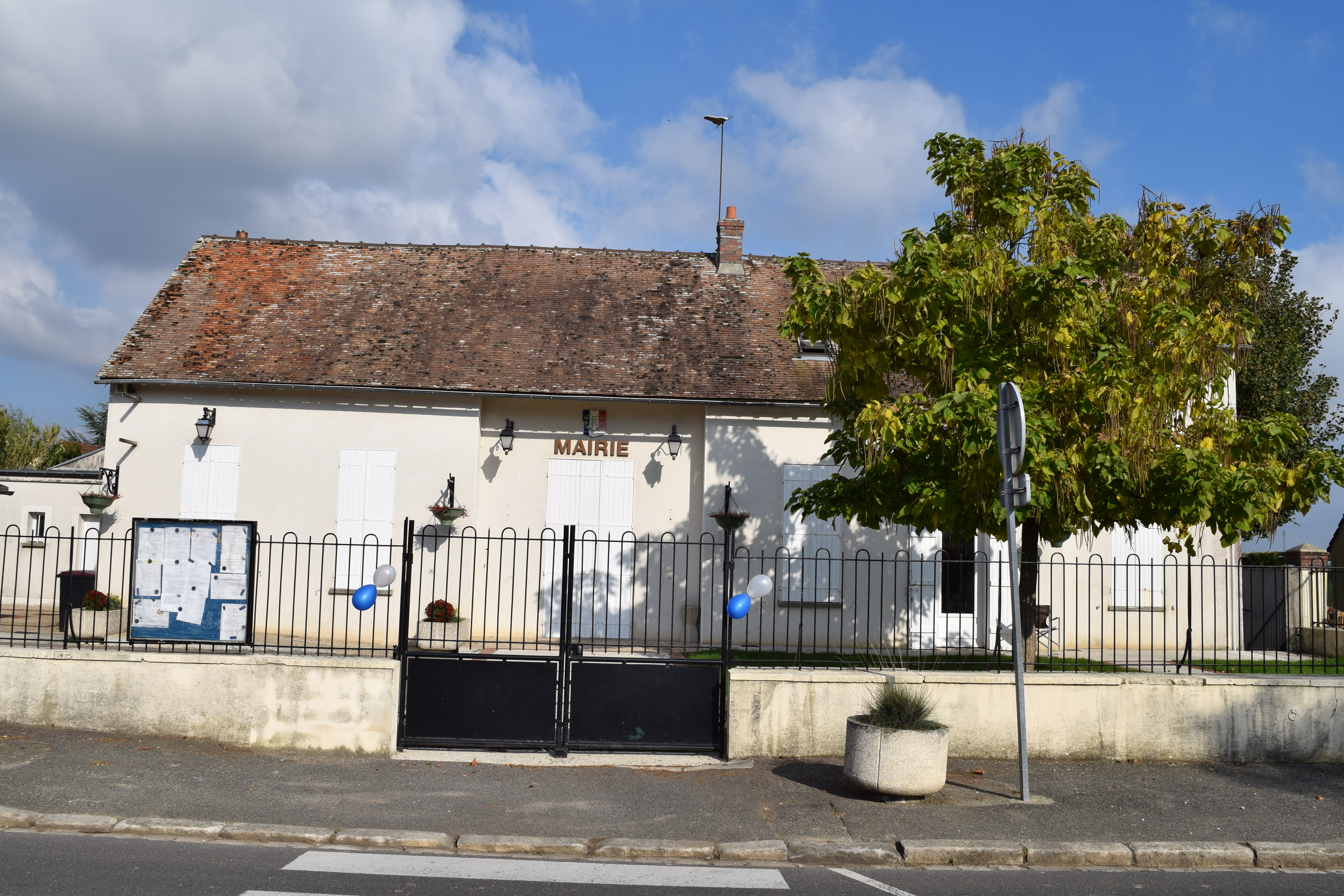
- The town hall in Grandpuits-Bailly-Carrois

- Coat of arms
- Location of Grandpuits-Bailly-Carrois
- Location within France Location within Île-de-France (region)
- Coordinates: 48°35′04″N 2°58′00″E
- Country: France
- Region: Île-de-France
- Department: Seine-et-Marne
- Arrondissement: Provins
- Canton: Nangis
- Intercommunality: La Brie Nangissienne

Government
  - Mayor (2020–2026): Jean-Jacques Brichet
- Area^{1}: 24.50 km^{2} (9.46 sq mi)
- Highest elevation: 137 m (449 ft)
- Lowest elevation: 98 m (322 ft)
- Population (2023): 1,009
  - Density: 41.18/km^{2} (106.7/sq mi)
- Time zone: UTC+01:00 (CET)
  - Summer (DST): UTC+02:00 (CEST)
- INSEE/Postal code: 77211 /77720
- ^{1} French Land Register data, which excludes lakes, ponds, glaciers > 1 km^{2} (0.386 sq mi or 247 acres) and river estuaries.

Grandpuits-Bailly-Carrois (French pronunciation: [ɡʁɑ̃pɥi baji kaʁwa]) is a commune in the Seine-et-Marne department in the Île-de-France region in north-central France. It was created in 1973 by the merger of two former communes: Grandpuits and Bailly-Carrois.

== See also ==
- Communes of the Seine-et-Marne department
