= Rampillon =

- Commune
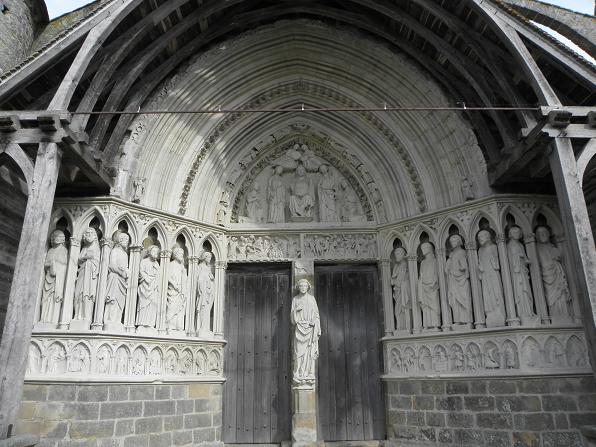
- Western portal of the church of Saint Eliphe.

- Coat of arms
- Location of Rampillon
- Location within France Location within Île-de-France (region)
- Coordinates: 48°33′02″N 3°04′00″E
- Country: France
- Region: Île-de-France
- Department: Seine-et-Marne
- Arrondissement: Provins
- Canton: Nangis
- Intercommunality: La Brie Nangissienne

Government
  - Mayor (2020–2026): Sébastien Coupas
- Area^{1}: 23.12 km^{2} (8.93 sq mi)
- Highest elevation: 144 m (472 ft)
- Lowest elevation: 120 m (390 ft)
- Population (2023): 836
  - Density: 36.2/km^{2} (93.7/sq mi)
- Time zone: UTC+01:00 (CET)
  - Summer (DST): UTC+02:00 (CEST)
- INSEE/Postal code: 77383 /77370
- ^{1} French Land Register data, which excludes lakes, ponds, glaciers > 1 km^{2} (0.386 sq mi or 247 acres) and river estuaries.

Rampillon (French pronunciation: [ʁɑ̃pijɔ̃]) is a commune in the Seine-et-Marne department in the Île-de-France region in north-central France.

The inhabitants are called Rampillonnais. It is home to the 13th-century church of Sainte Eliphe, with a portal decorated with a "Final Judgement" and a calendar.

== See also ==
- Communes of the Seine-et-Marne department
