= Saint-Just-en-Brie =

- Commune
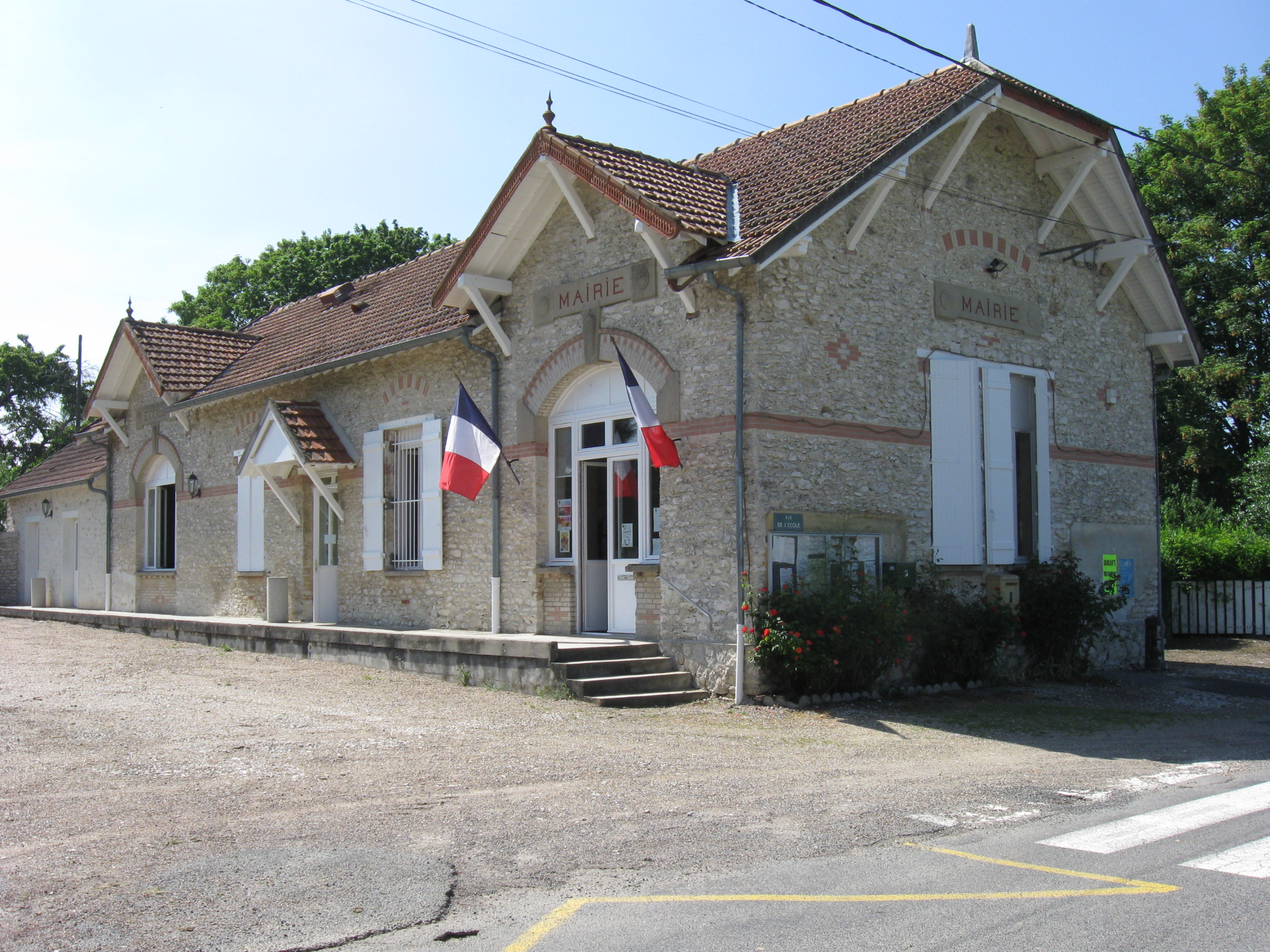
- The town hall in Saint-Just-en-Brie
- Location of Saint-Just-en-Brie
- Location within France Location within Île-de-France (region)
- Coordinates: 48°36′50″N 3°07′02″E
- Country: France
- Region: Île-de-France
- Department: Seine-et-Marne
- Arrondissement: Provins
- Canton: Nangis
- Intercommunality: La Brie Nangissienne

Government
  - Mayor (2020–2026): Sébastien Dromigny
- Area^{1}: 7.36 km^{2} (2.84 sq mi)
- Highest elevation: 154 m (505 ft)
- Lowest elevation: 123 m (404 ft)
- Population (2023): 265
  - Density: 36.0/km^{2} (93.3/sq mi)
- Time zone: UTC+01:00 (CET)
  - Summer (DST): UTC+02:00 (CEST)
- INSEE/Postal code: 77416 /77370
- ^{1} French Land Register data, which excludes lakes, ponds, glaciers > 1 km^{2} (0.386 sq mi or 247 acres) and river estuaries.

Saint-Just-en-Brie (French pronunciation: [sɛ̃ ʒyst ɑ̃ bʁi]) is a commune in the Seine-et-Marne department in the Île-de-France region in north-central France.

== See also ==
- Communes of the Seine-et-Marne department
