= Jouy-le-Châtel =

- Commune
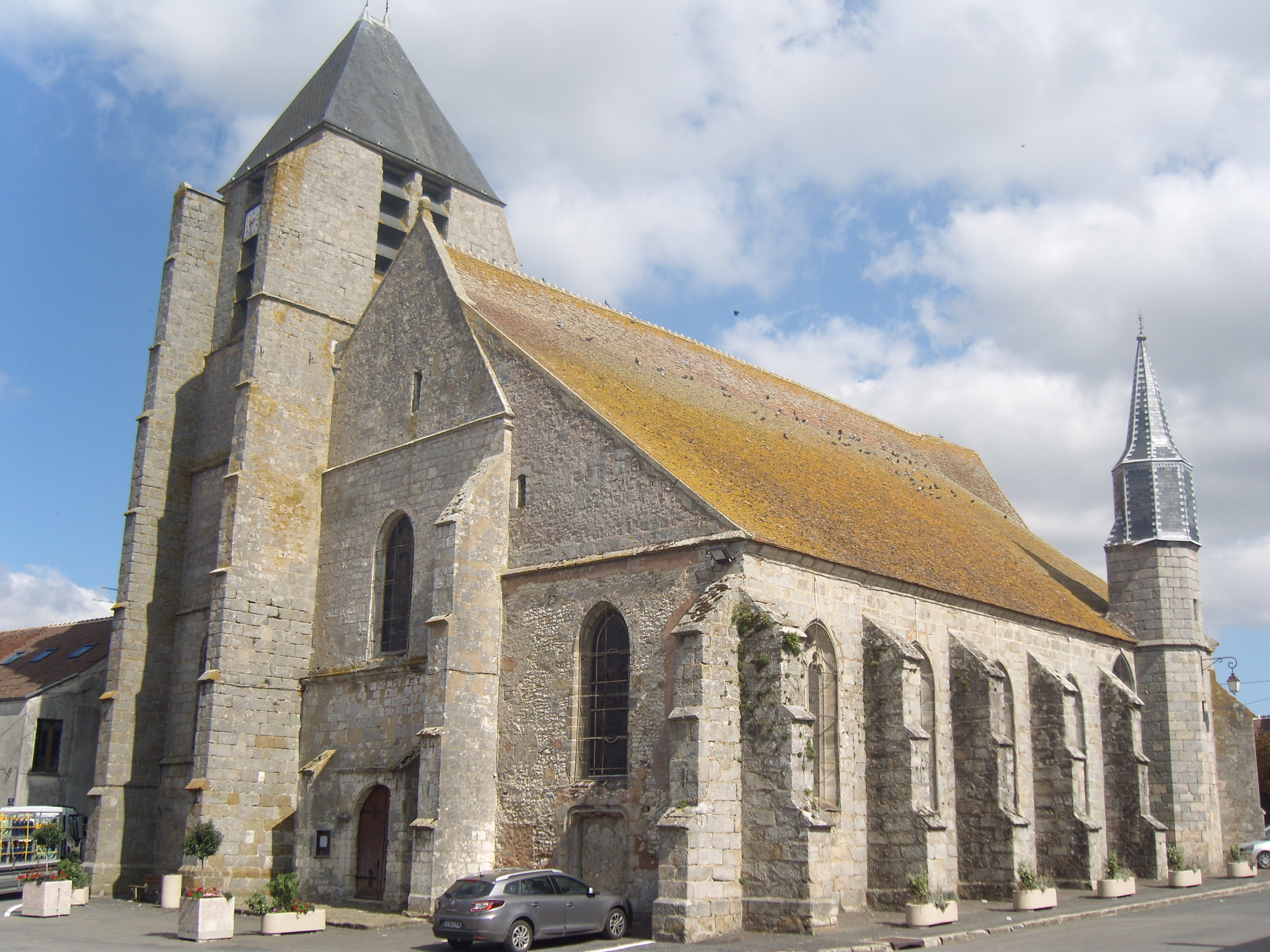
- The church in Jouy-le-Châtel

- Coat of arms
- Location of Jouy-le-Châtel
- Location within France Location within Île-de-France (region)
- Coordinates: 48°40′02″N 3°07′47″E
- Country: France
- Region: Île-de-France
- Department: Seine-et-Marne
- Arrondissement: Provins
- Canton: Provins
- Intercommunality: CC Provinois

Government
  - Mayor (2020–2026): Stéphane Bachelet
- Area^{1}: 37.68 km^{2} (14.55 sq mi)
- Highest elevation: 161 m (528 ft)
- Lowest elevation: 109 m (358 ft)
- Population (2023): 1,630
  - Density: 43.3/km^{2} (112/sq mi)
- Time zone: UTC+01:00 (CET)
  - Summer (DST): UTC+02:00 (CEST)
- INSEE/Postal code: 77239 /77970
- ^{1} French Land Register data, which excludes lakes, ponds, glaciers > 1 km^{2} (0.386 sq mi or 247 acres) and river estuaries.

Jouy-le-Châtel (French pronunciation: [ʒwi lə ʃɑtɛl]) is a commune in the Seine-et-Marne department in the Île-de-France region in north-central France.

== Demographics ==
Inhabitants are called Joviciens.

== See also ==
- Communes of the Seine-et-Marne department
