= Gastins =

- Commune
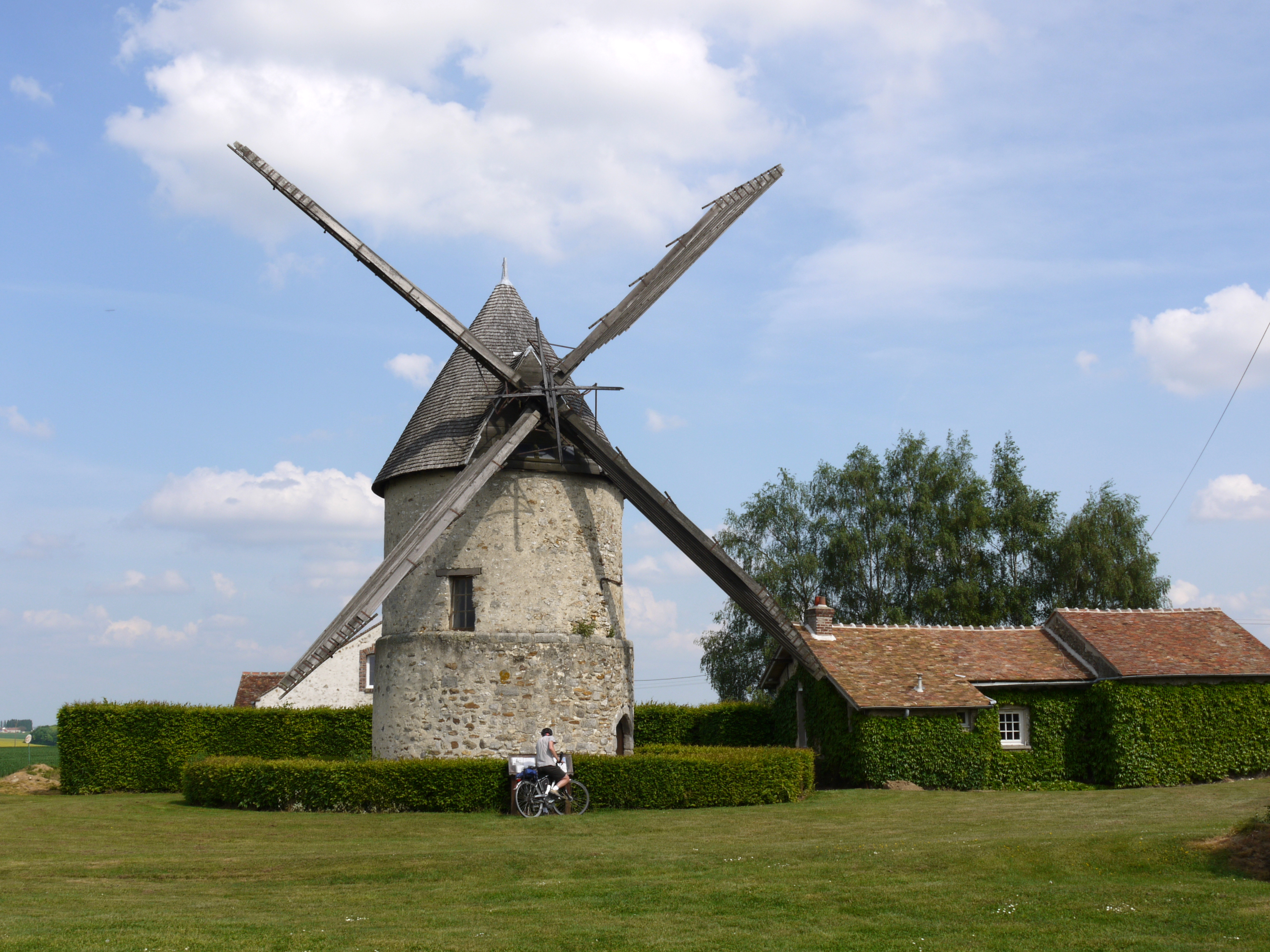
- The Choix windmill in Gastins

- Coat of arms
- Location of Gastins
- Location within France Location within Île-de-France (region)
- Coordinates: 48°37′46″N 3°01′18″E
- Country: France
- Region: Île-de-France
- Department: Seine-et-Marne
- Arrondissement: Provins
- Canton: Nangis
- Intercommunality: CC Brie Nangissienne

Government
  - Mayor (2020–2026): Arnaud Pommier
- Area^{1}: 14.95 km^{2} (5.77 sq mi)
- Highest elevation: 139 m (456 ft)
- Lowest elevation: 93 m (305 ft)
- Population (2023): 741
  - Density: 49.6/km^{2} (128/sq mi)
- Time zone: UTC+01:00 (CET)
  - Summer (DST): UTC+02:00 (CEST)
- INSEE/Postal code: 77201 /77370
- ^{1} French Land Register data, which excludes lakes, ponds, glaciers > 1 km^{2} (0.386 sq mi or 247 acres) and river estuaries.

Gastins (French pronunciation: [ɡastɛ̃]) is a commune in the Seine-et-Marne department in the Île-de-France region in north-central France.

== Demographics ==
Inhabitants are called Gastinois.

== See also ==
- Communes of the Seine-et-Marne department
