= La Croix-en-Brie =

- Commune
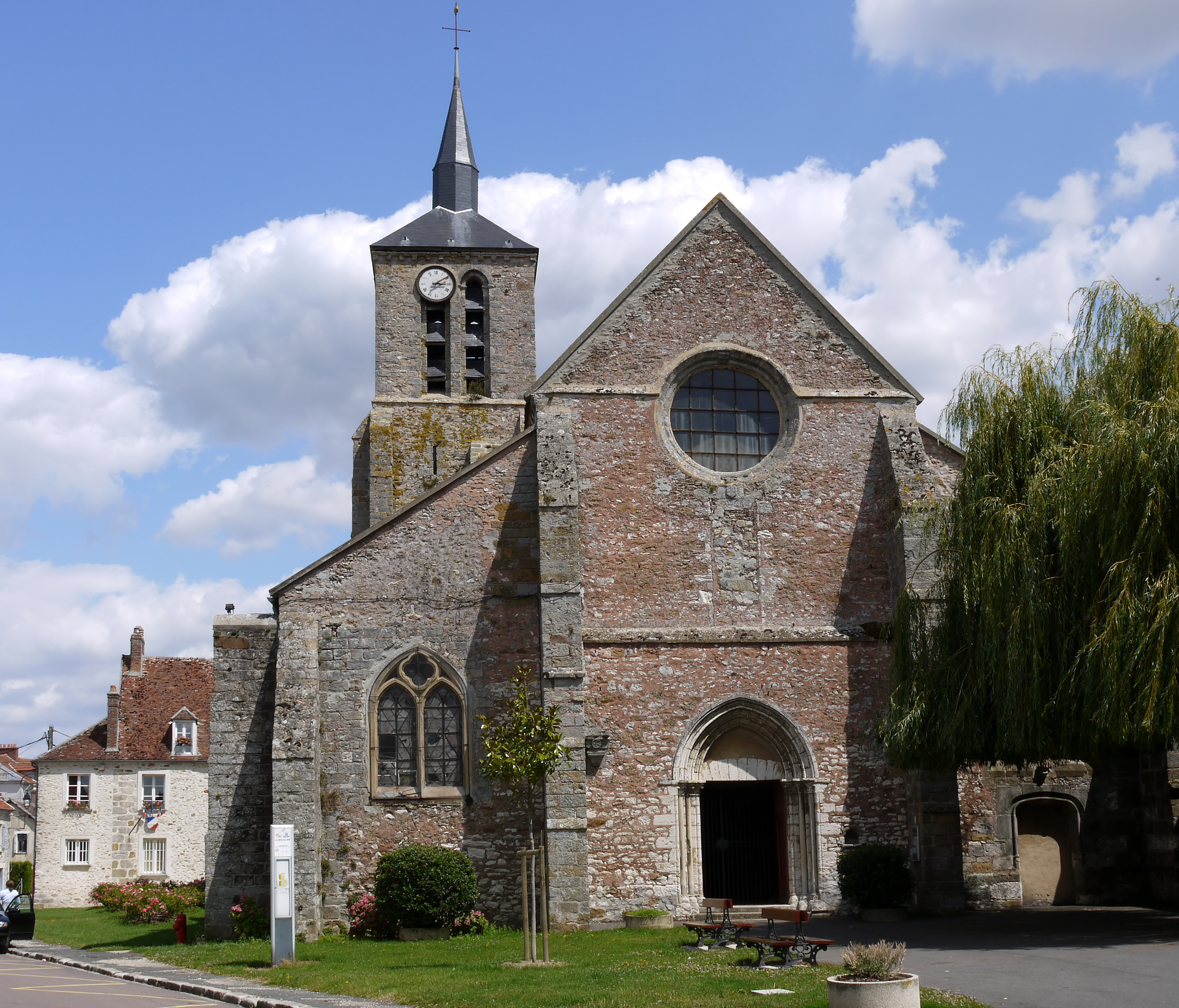
- The church in La Croix-en-Brie

- Coat of arms
- Location of La Croix-en-Brie
- Location within France Location within Île-de-France (region)
- Coordinates: 48°35′36″N 3°04′31″E
- Country: France
- Region: Île-de-France
- Department: Seine-et-Marne
- Arrondissement: Provins
- Canton: Nangis
- Intercommunality: CC Brie Nangissienne

Government
  - Mayor (2020–2026): Francis Oudot
- Area^{1}: 29.43 km^{2} (11.36 sq mi)
- Highest elevation: 144 m (472 ft)
- Lowest elevation: 106 m (348 ft)
- Population (2023): 681
  - Density: 23.1/km^{2} (59.9/sq mi)
- Time zone: UTC+01:00 (CET)
  - Summer (DST): UTC+02:00 (CEST)
- INSEE/Postal code: 77147 /77370
- ^{1} French Land Register data, which excludes lakes, ponds, glaciers > 1 km^{2} (0.386 sq mi or 247 acres) and river estuaries.

La Croix-en-Brie (French: [la.kʁwa.ɑ̃.bʁi]) is a commune in the Seine-et-Marne department in the Île-de-France region in north-central France.

== Demographics ==
Inhabitants of La Croix-en-Brie are called Crucibriards.

== See also ==
- Communes of the Seine-et-Marne department
