= Nangis =

- Commune
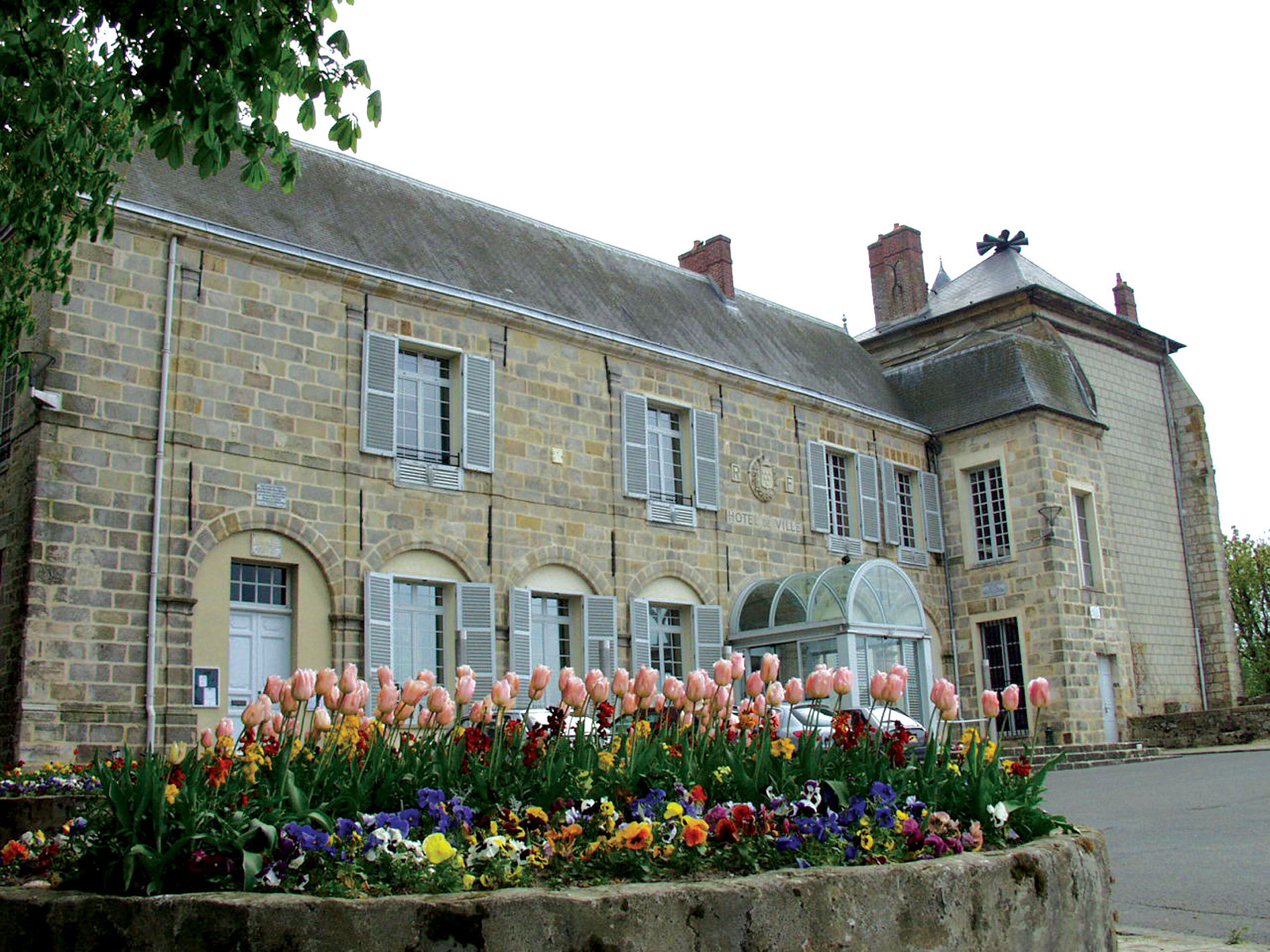
- Castle and town hall

- Coat of arms
- Location of Nangis
- Location within France Location within Île-de-France (region)
- Coordinates: 48°33′20″N 3°00′55″E
- Country: France
- Region: Île-de-France
- Department: Seine-et-Marne
- Arrondissement: Provins
- Canton: Nangis
- Intercommunality: La Brie Nangissienne

Government
  - Mayor (2020–2026): Nolwenn Le Bouter
- Area^{1}: 24.16 km^{2} (9.33 sq mi)
- Highest elevation: 140 m (460 ft)
- Lowest elevation: 103 m (338 ft)
- Population (2023): 8,867
  - Density: 367.0/km^{2} (950.6/sq mi)
- Time zone: UTC+01:00 (CET)
  - Summer (DST): UTC+02:00 (CEST)
- INSEE/Postal code: 77327 /77370
- ^{1} French Land Register data, which excludes lakes, ponds, glaciers > 1 km^{2} (0.386 sq mi or 247 acres) and river estuaries.

Nangis (French pronunciation: [nɑ̃ʒi]) is a commune in the Seine-et-Marne department in the Île-de-France region in north-central France. Nangis station has rail connections to Provins, Longueville and Paris.

== Coat of arms ==
Azure with six argent roundels.

== Demographics ==
The inhabitants are called the Nangissiens in French.

Historical population
Year	Pop.	±% p.a.
1968	5,359	—
1975	6,589	+3.00%
1982	6,869	+0.60%
1990	7,013	+0.26%
1999	7,479	+0.72%
2007	7,560	+0.13%
2012	8,351	+2.01%
2017	8,710	+0.85%
2023	8,867	+0.30%
Source: INSEE

== See also ==
- Château de Nangis
- Communes of the Seine-et-Marne department
