= Mormant station =

Railway station in Mormant, France

Coordinates: 48°36′49″N 2°53′20″E

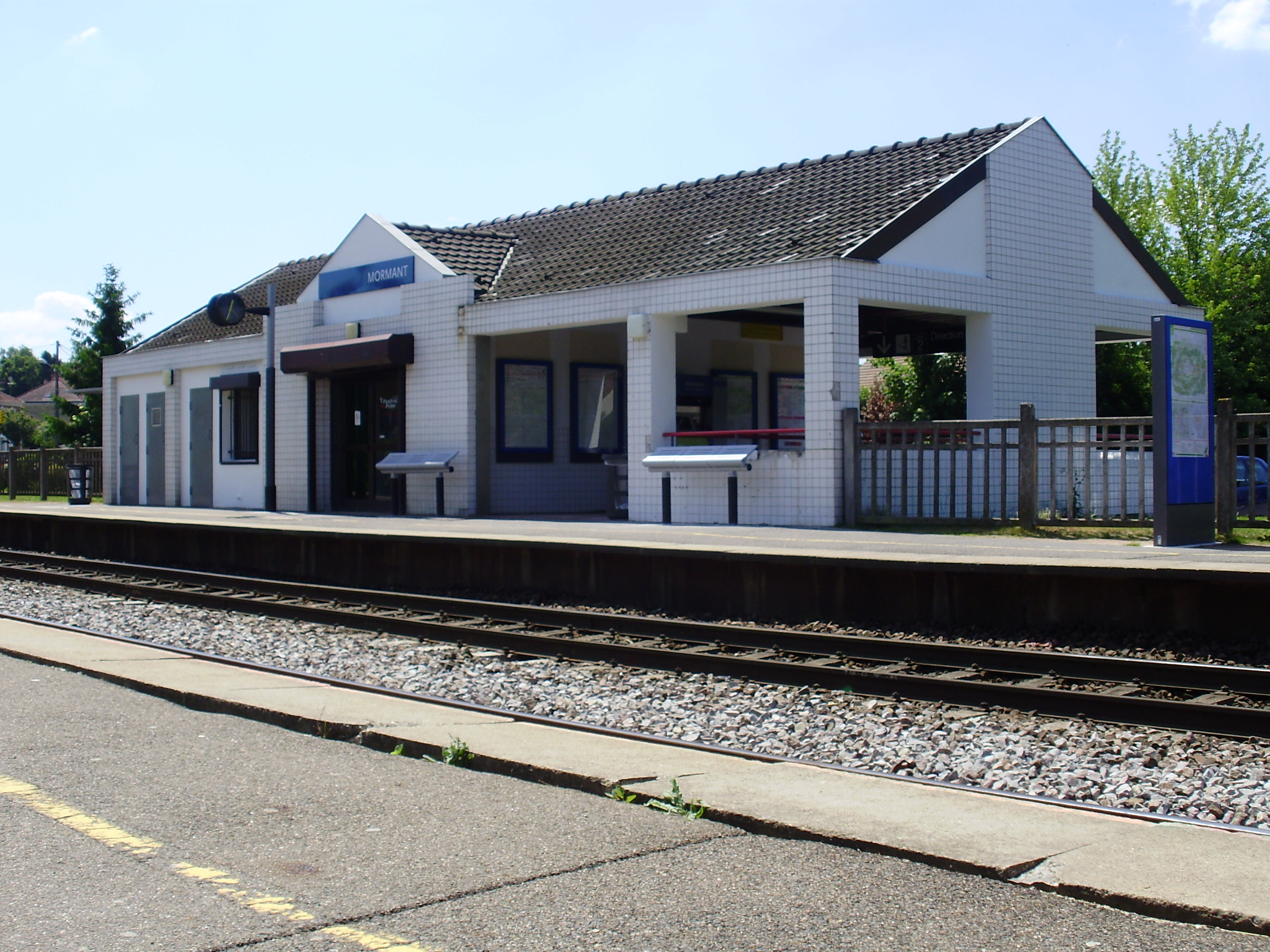
Mormant station

Mormant is a railway station in Mormant, Île-de-France, France. The station is on the Paris–Mulhouse railway line. The station is served by TER (local) services operated by SNCF: Transilien line P (Paris–Longueville–Provins).

== Gallery ==
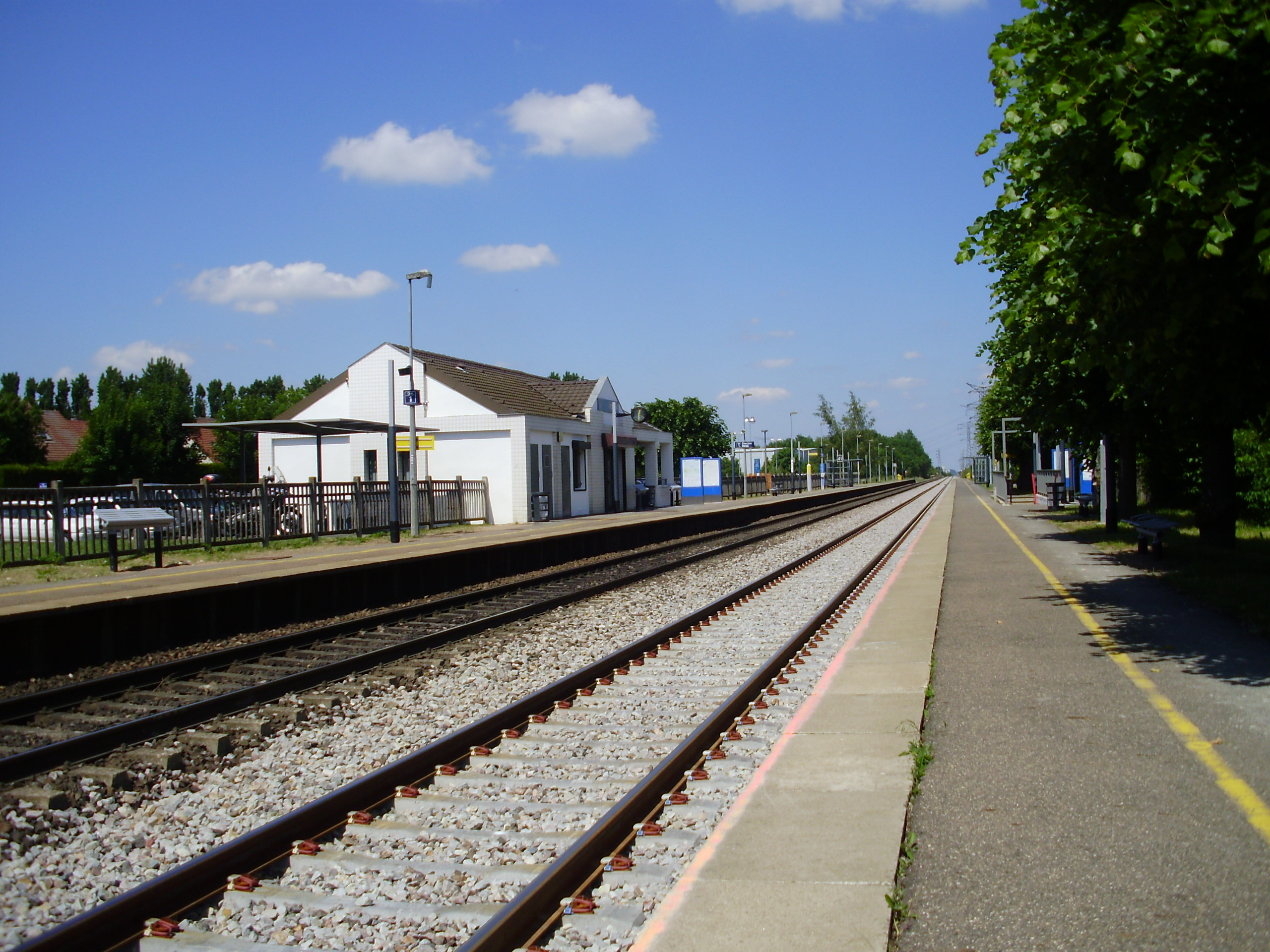
The station

Preceding station	Transilien	Following station
Verneuil-l'Étang towards Paris-Est	Line P	Nangis towards Provins
