= Nangis station =

Railway station in Nangis, France

Coordinates: 48°33′41″N 3°00′46″E

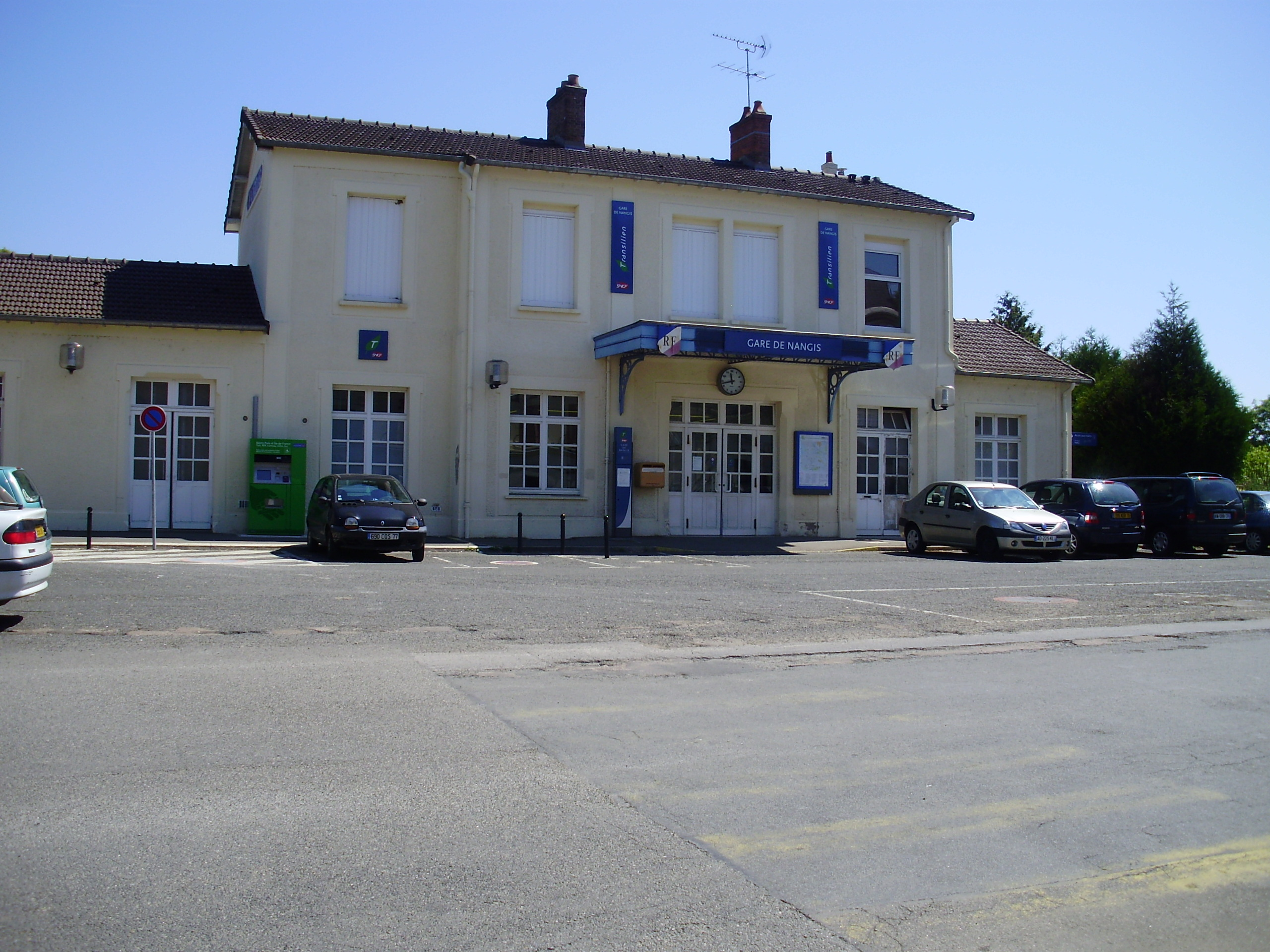
Nangis station

Nangis station (French: Gare de Nangis) is a railway station in Nangis, Île-de-France, France. The station is located on the Paris Est–Mulhouse railway line. The station is served by TER (local) services operated by SNCF: Transilien line P (Paris–Longueville–Provins).

== Gallery ==
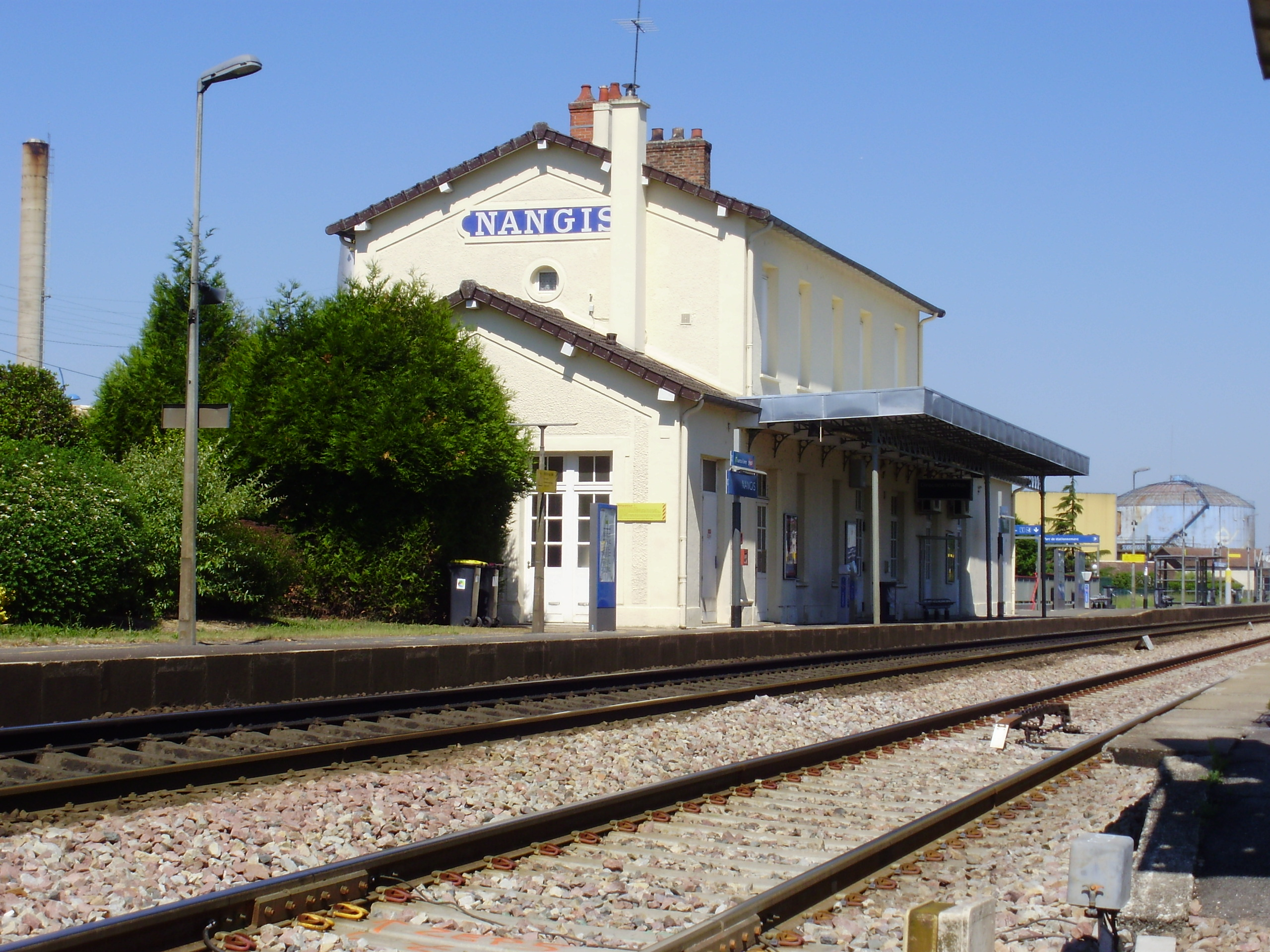
The station

== See also ==
- List of SNCF stations in Île-de-France
- List of Transilien stations

Preceding station	Transilien	Following station
Mormant towards Paris-Est	Line P	Longueville towards Provins
