= Sainte-Colombe–Septveilles station =

Railway station in Sainte-Colombe, France

Coordinates: 48°31′47″N 3°15′22″E

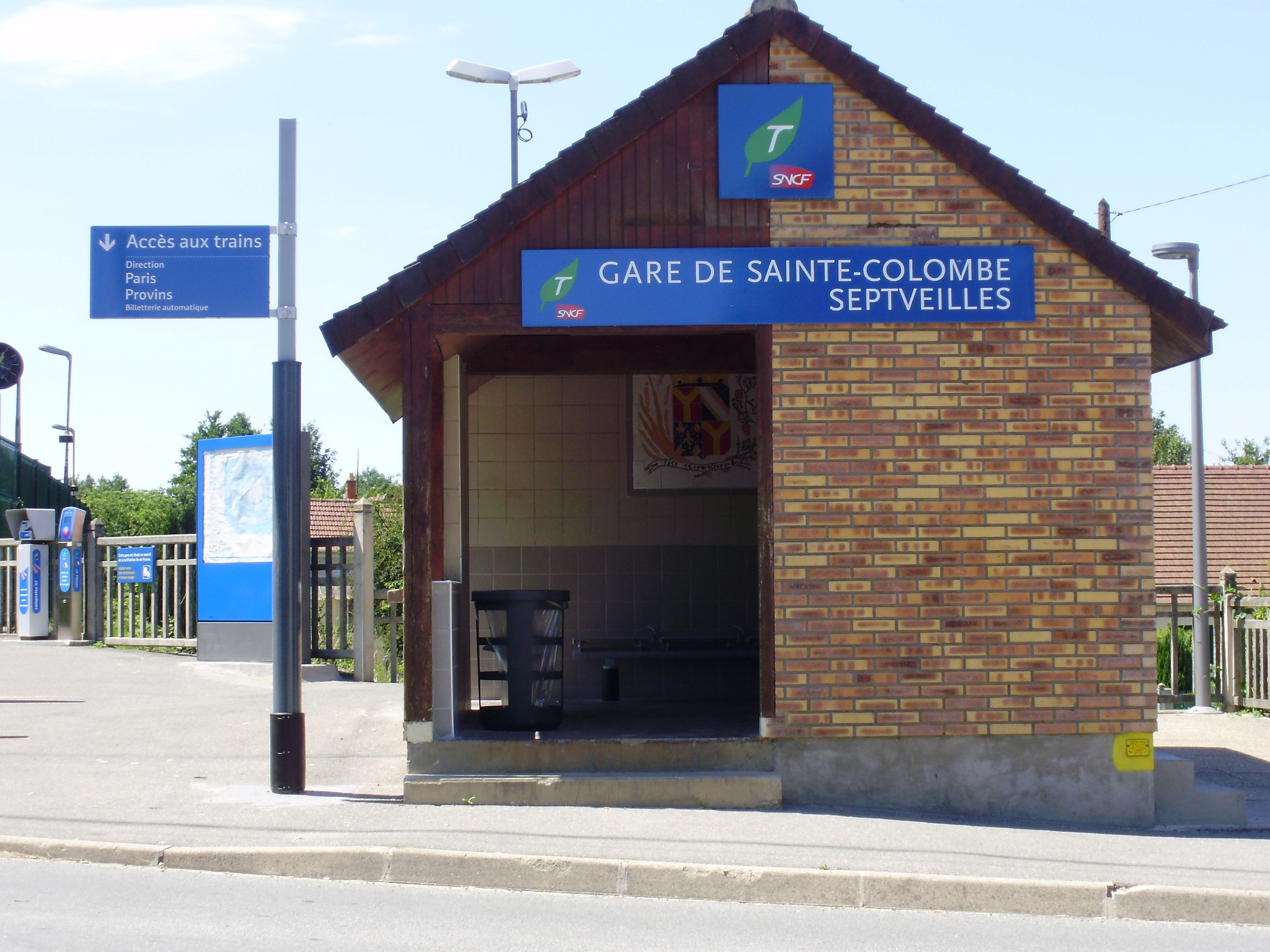
Sainte-Colombe–Septveilles station

Sainte-Colombe–Septveilles station (French: Gare de Sainte-Colombe–Septveilles) is a railway station in Sainte-Colombe, Île-de-France, France. The station is on the Longueville–Esternay railway line is served by Transilien line P (Paris–Longueville–Provins) services, operated by the SNCF.

== Gallery ==
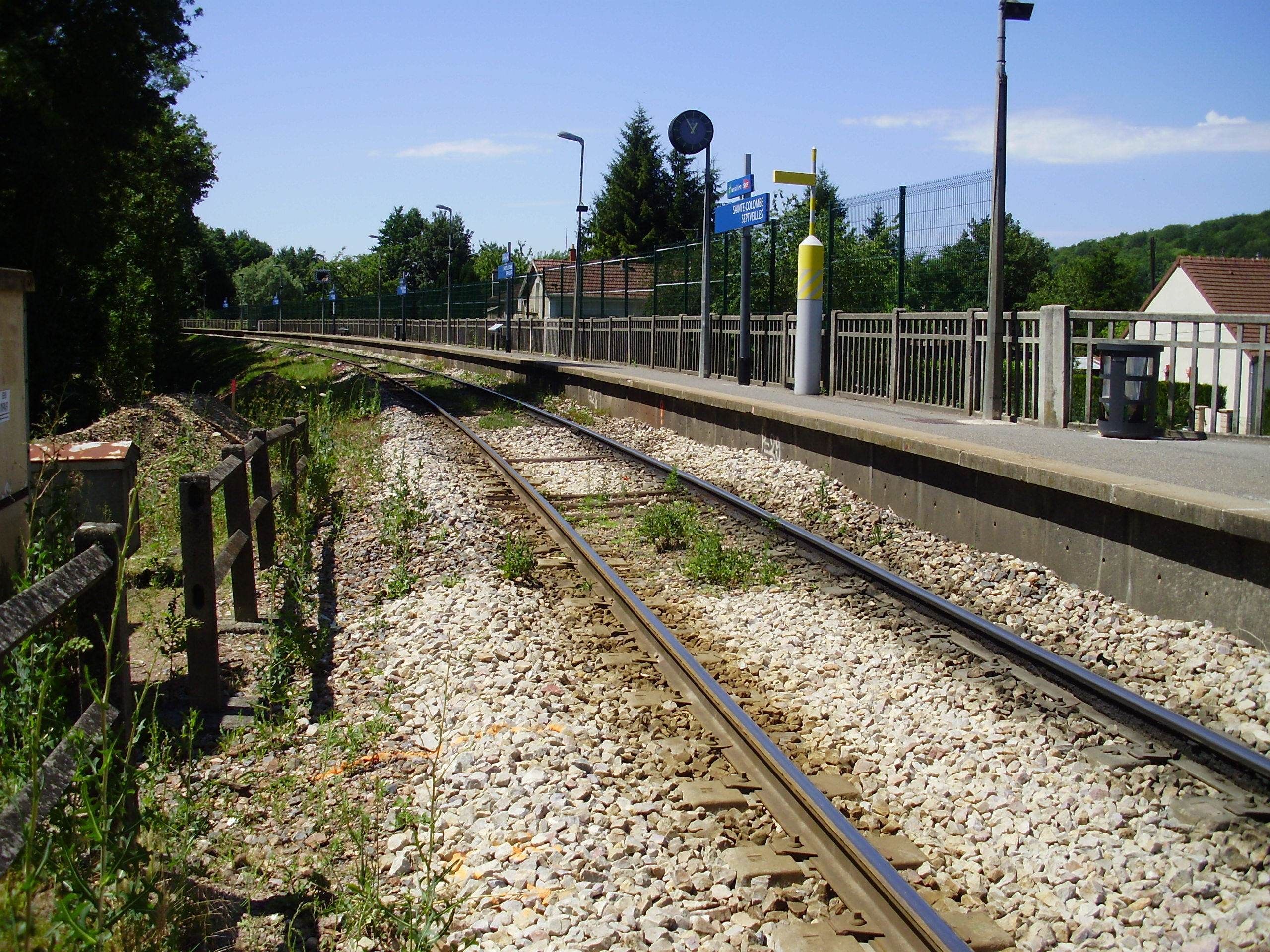
The station

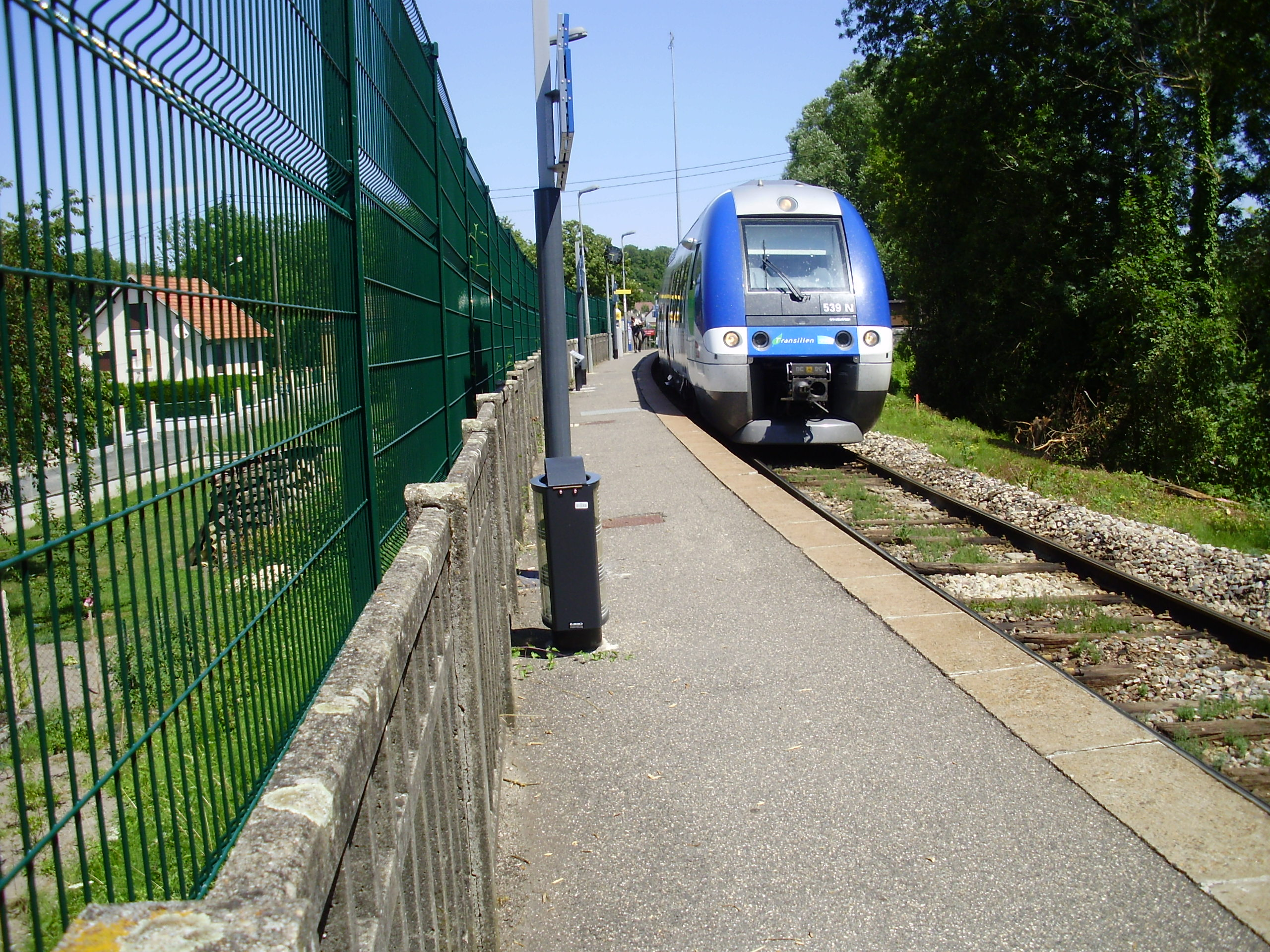
B82500 at Sainte-Colombe-Septveilles

== See also ==
- List of SNCF stations in Île-de-France
- List of Transilien stations

Preceding station	Transilien	Following station
Longueville towards Paris-Est	Line P	Champbenoist-Poigny towards Provins
