= Longueville station =

Railway station in Longueville, Île-de-France, France

Longueville
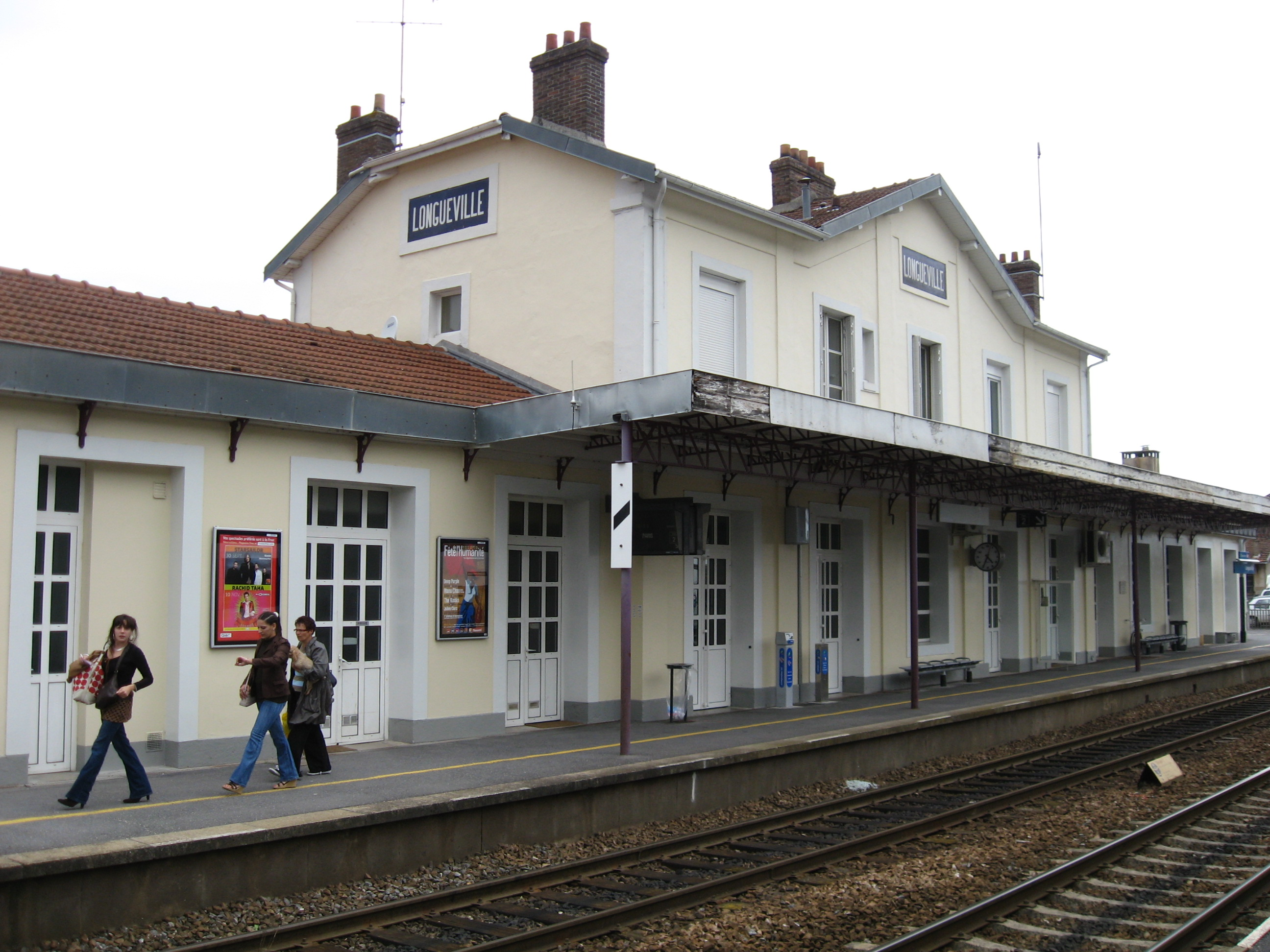
- Longueville station

General information
- Location: Rue de Verdun; 77650 Longueville; France
- Coordinates: 48.51317°N 3.2476851°E
- Owner: SNCF
- Operator: SNCF
- Lines: Paris-Est–Mulhouse-Ville railway Longueville-Esternay railway
- Platforms: 3
- Tracks: 4
- Connections: Provinois - Brie et Seine: 3201 3203 3211 3217 3219 3256

Other information
- Station code: 87116137
- Fare zone: 5

History
- Opened: 1857

Passengers
- 2024: 1,041,424
Location

Longueville is a railway station in Longueville, Île-de-France, France.

== The station ==
The station opened in December 1858 and is located on the Paris-Est–Mulhouse-Ville and Longueville–Esternay railway lines. The station is served by TER services operated by SNCF:

- Transilien line P Paris–Longueville–Provins
- TER Grand Est (long distance) Paris–Troyes–Chaumont–Mulhouse/Dijon

Close to the station is the former locomotive depot and roundhouse. The roundhouse is now a historical monument, built in 1911 it was last used by the SNCF in 1967. Since 1971, it has housed the museum for the preservation group AJECTA, which features steam and diesel trains.

The train to Provins changes direction here.

== Gallery ==
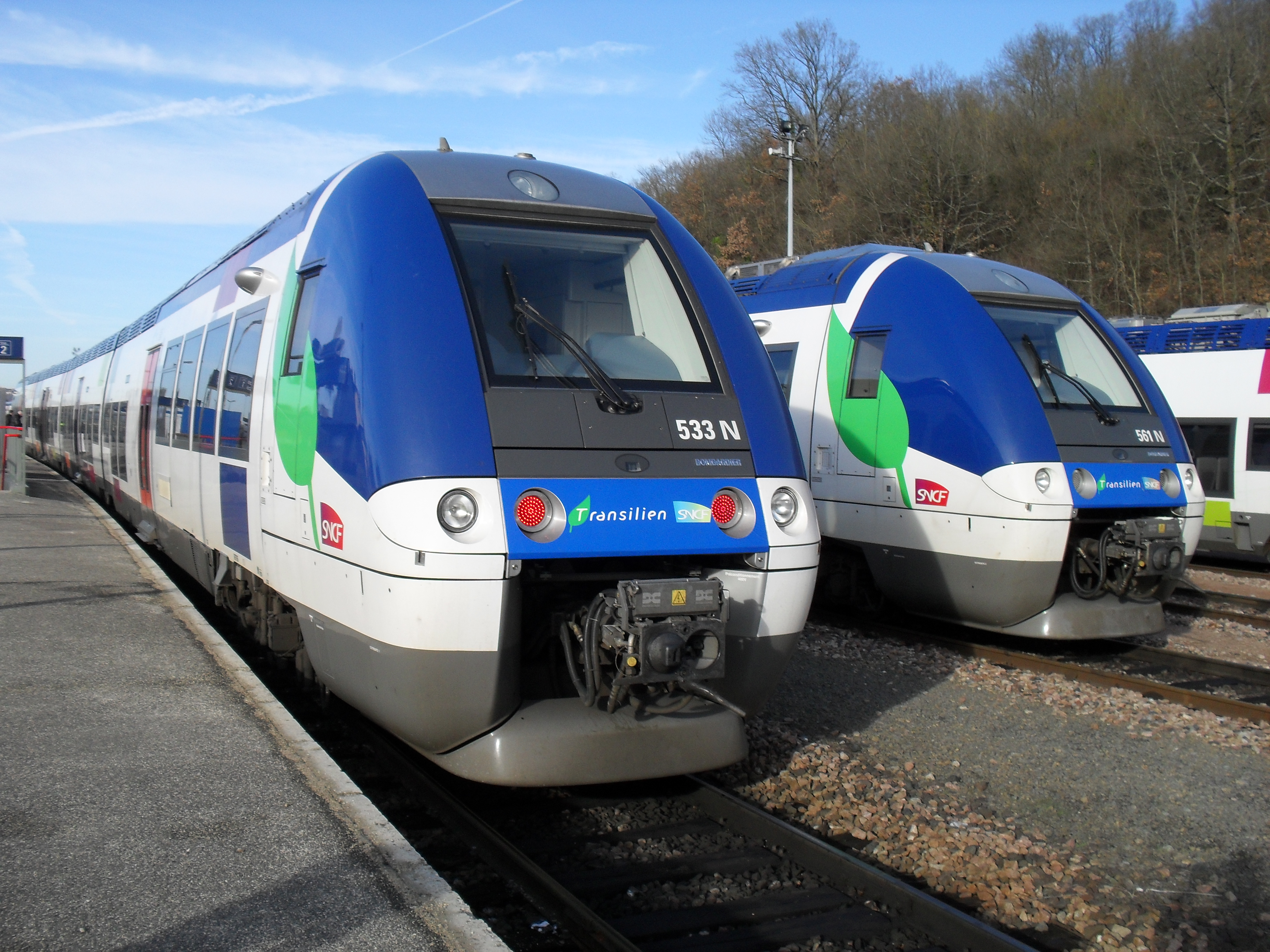
B82500 at Longueville

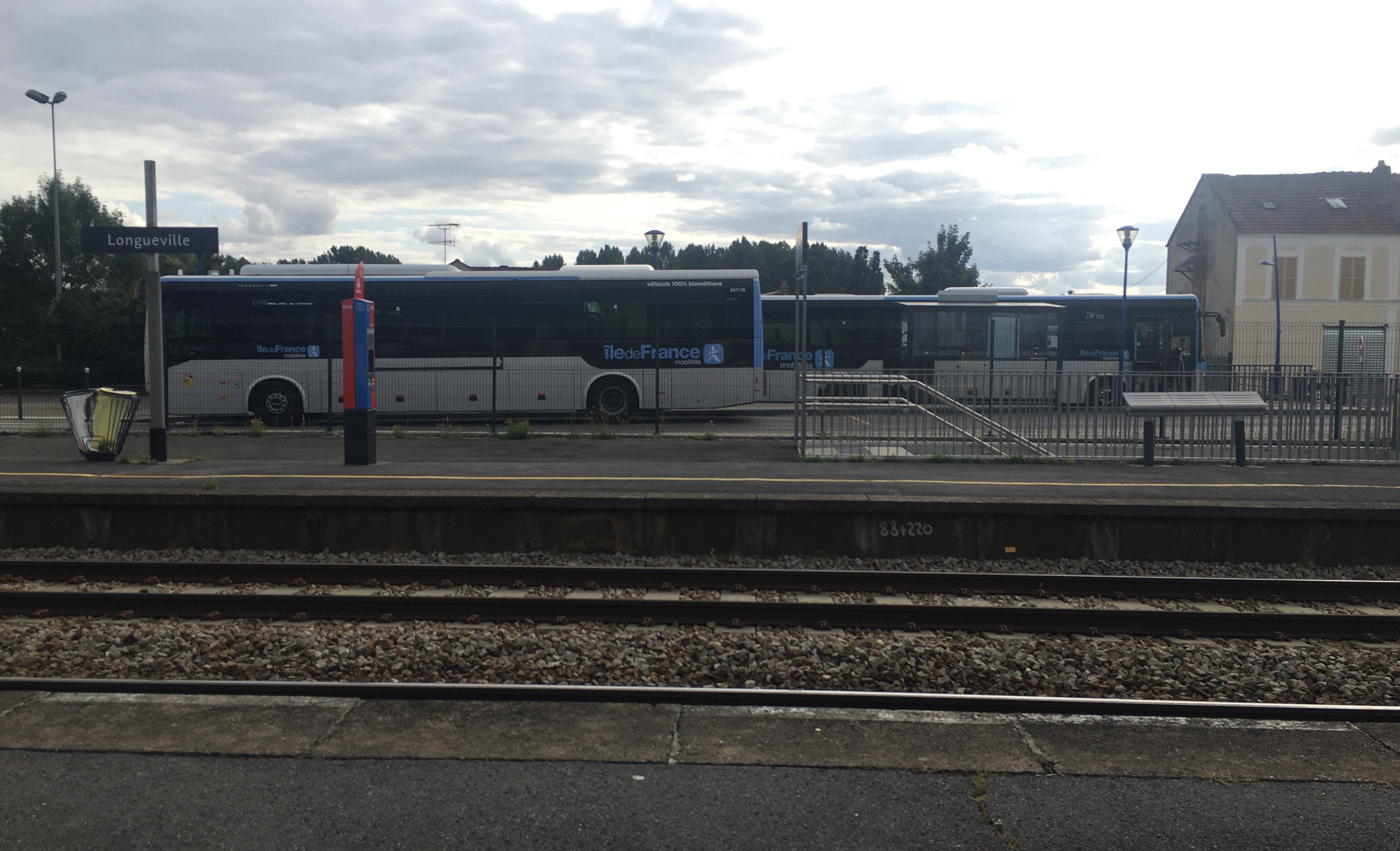
Bus station from the railway station

Preceding station	Transilien	Following station
Nangis towards Paris-Est	Line P	Sainte-Colombe-Septveilles towards Provins
Preceding station	TER Grand Est	Following station
Paris-Est Terminus	C04	Nogent-sur-Seine towards Mulhouse or Dijon
