= Verneuil-l'Étang station =

Railway station in Verneuil-l'Étang, Île-de-France, France

Coordinates: 48°38′42″N 2°49′30″E

Verneuil-l'Étang
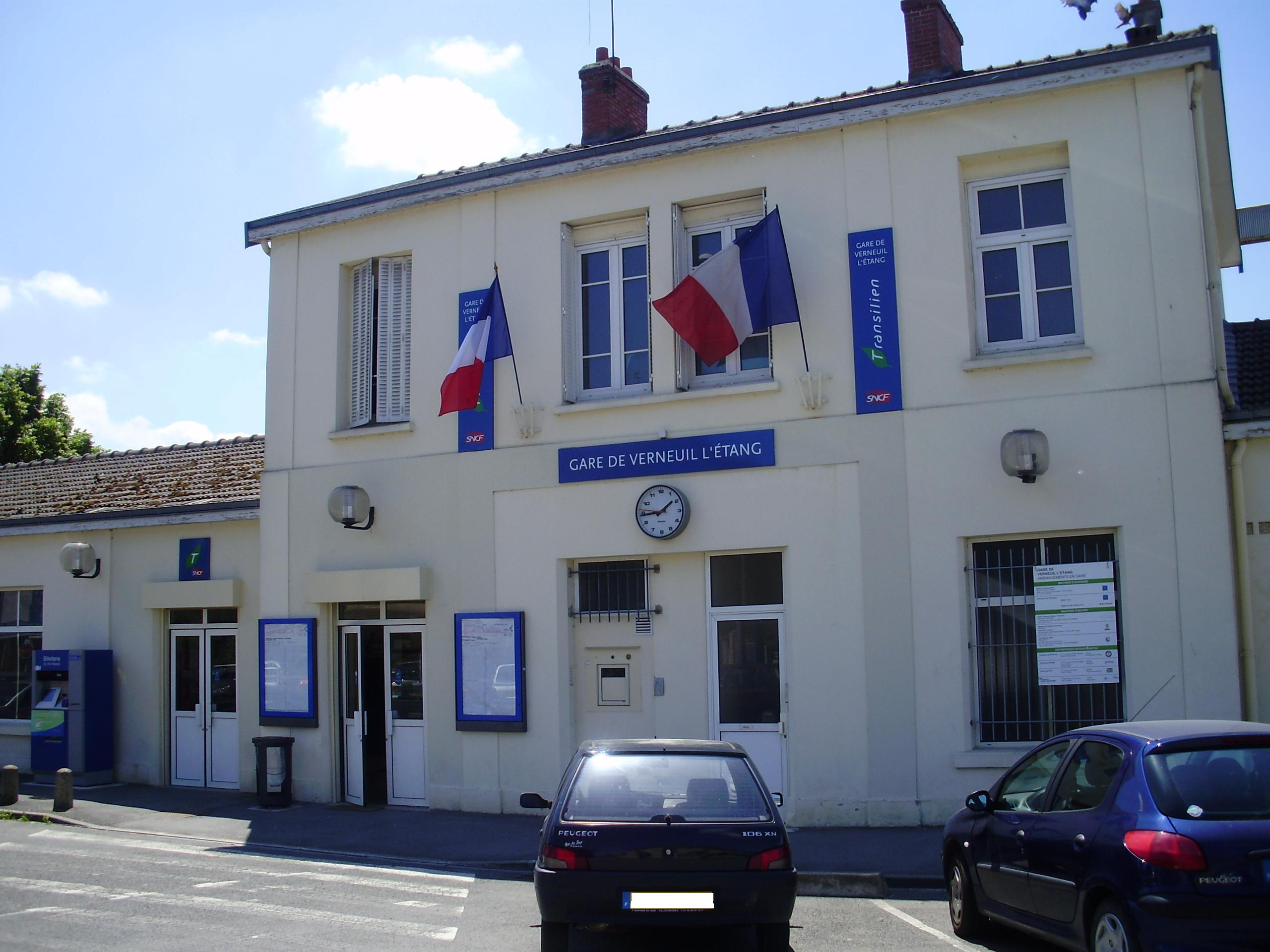

General information
- Location: 41 Rue de la Gare; 77390 Verneuil-l'Étang; Seine-et-Marne; France
- Owner: SNCF
- Operator: SNCF

History
- Opened: 9 February 1857
Location

Verneuil-l'Étang station (French: Gare de Verneuil-l'Étang) is a railway station in Verneuil-l'Étang, Île-de-France, France. The station is on the Paris–Mulhouse railway line. The station is served by TER (local) services operated by SNCF: Transilien line P (Paris–Longueville–Provins).

From 1892 until 1950 the station was terminus of the Vincennes railway line, from Paris-Bastille. The station was also the start of the line to Marles-en-Brie via Chaumes-en-Brie and Fontenay-Trésigny, from 1893 until 1913 when the lines were closed because there was not enough use of the services. There also used to be a tram to Melun, which finished here.

== Gallery ==
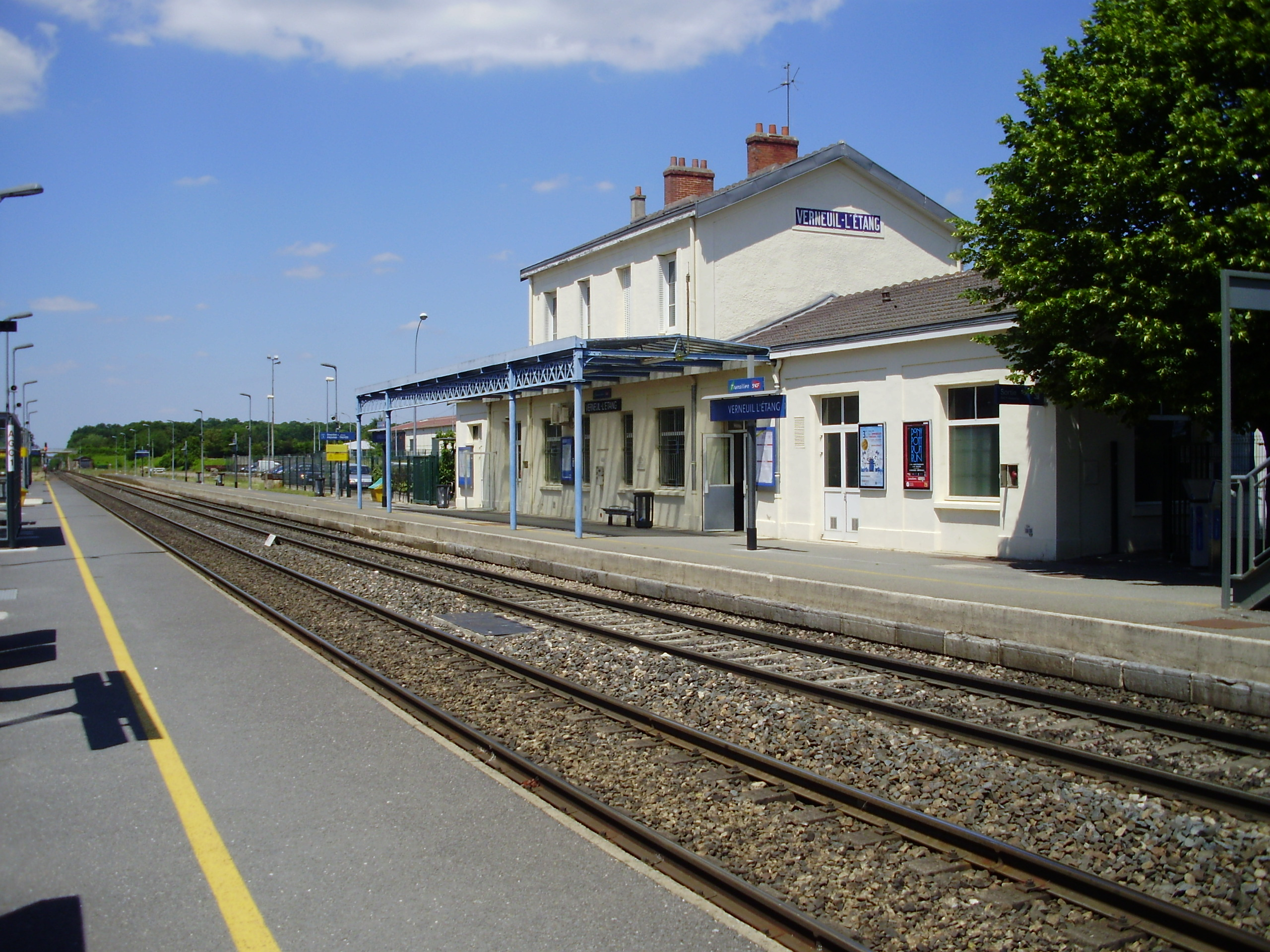
The station

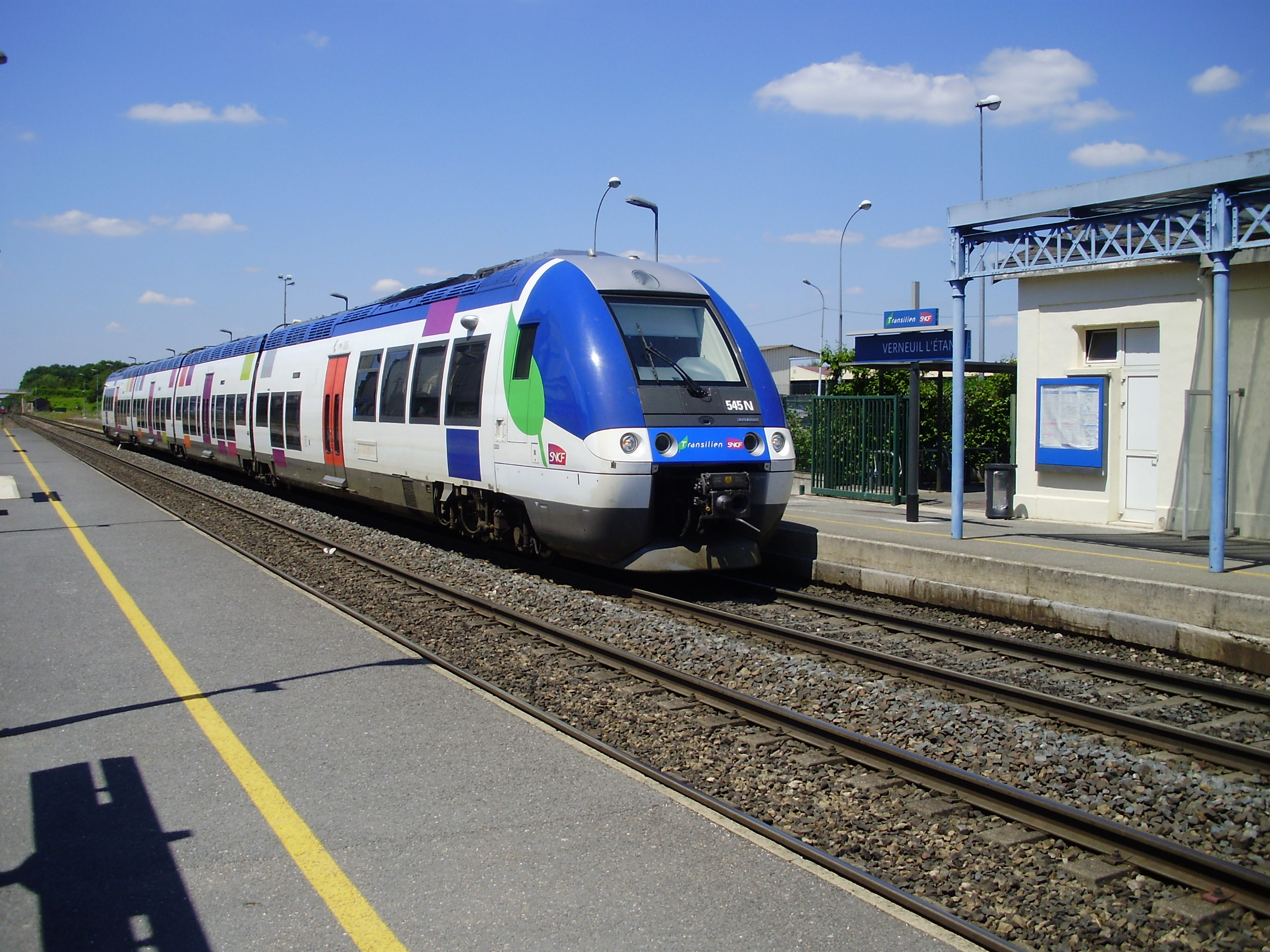
A B82500 arrives at the station

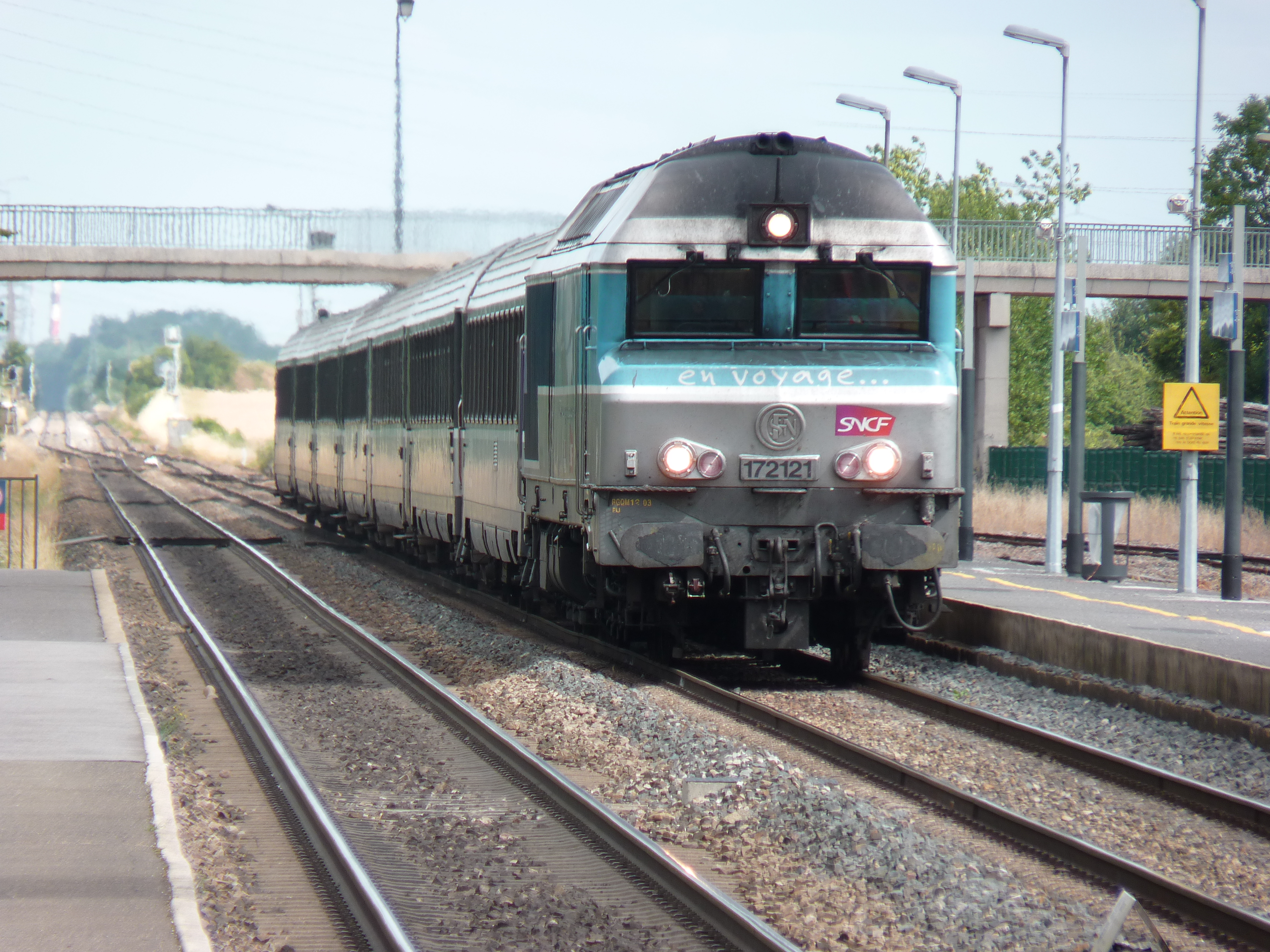
An express train passing through the station

Preceding station	Transilien	Following station
Paris-Est Terminus	Line P	Mormant towards Provins

Preceding station	Transilien	Following station
Villiers–Champigny–Bry towards Paris-Est	Line P (late 2025)	Mormant towards Provins
