= Champbenoist–Poigny station =

Railway station in Provins, Île-de-France, France

Coordinates: 48°32′44″N 3°17′14″E

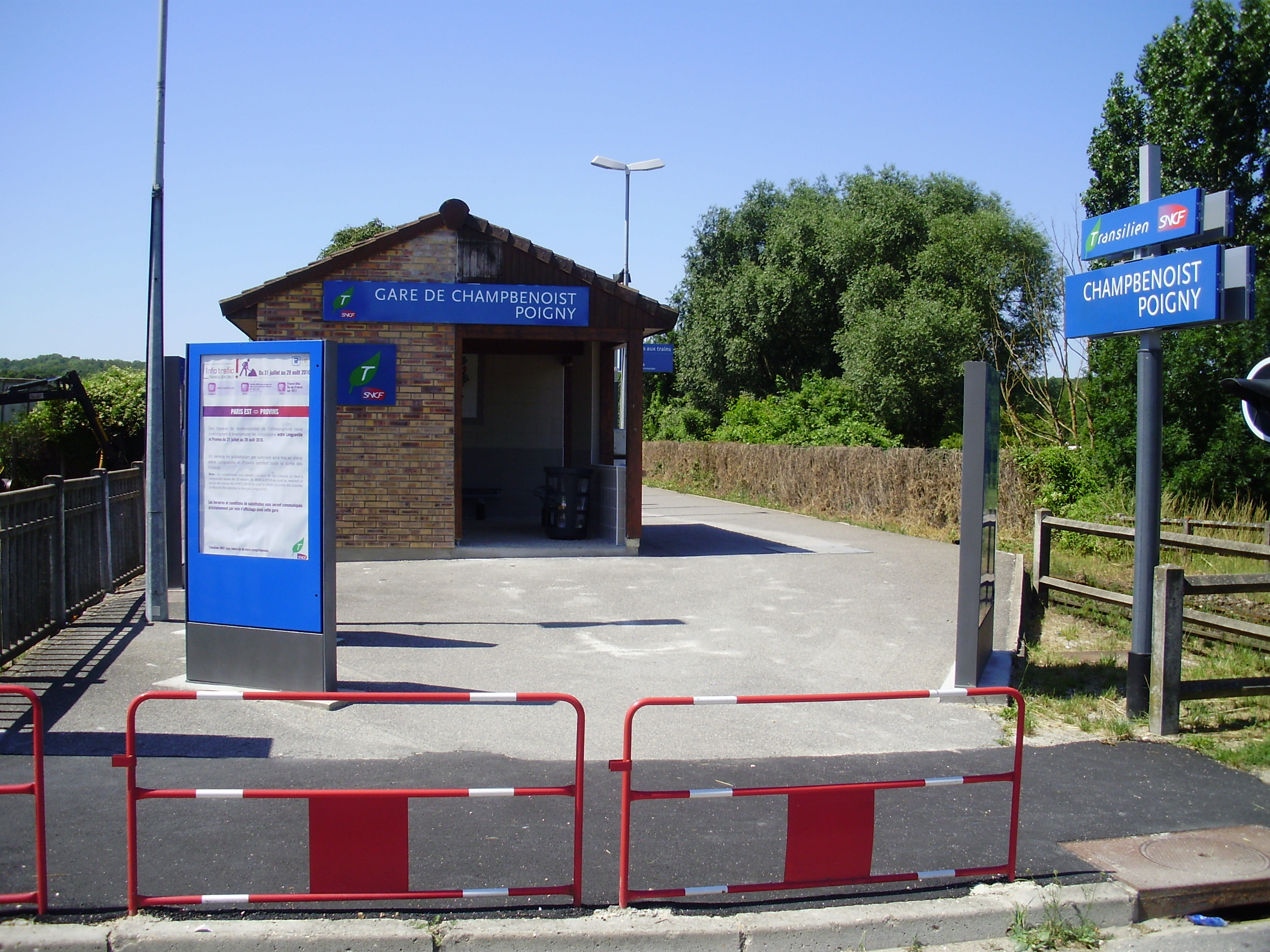
Champbenoist–Poigny station

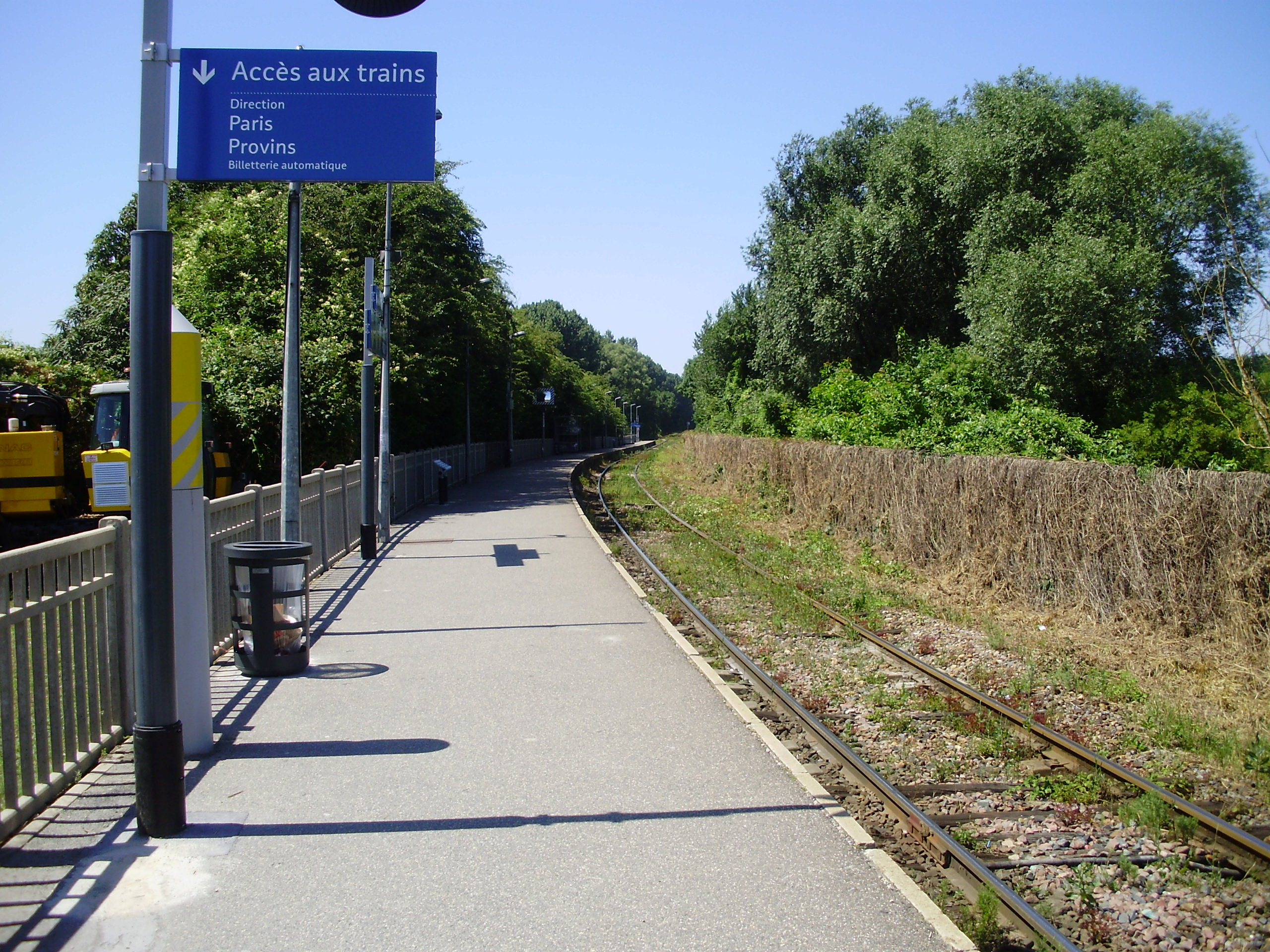
The station

Champbenoist–Poigny is a railway station in Poigny near Provins, Île-de-France, France. The station is on the Longueville–Esternay railway line. It is served by TER (local) services operated by SNCF. The station is served by Transilien line P (Paris–Verneuil-l'Étang–Longueville–Provins).

Preceding station	Transilien	Following station
Sainte-Colombe-Septveilles towards Paris-Est	Line P	Provins Terminus
