= La Ferté-Milon station =

Railway station in La Ferté-Milon, France

Coordinates: 49°10′47″N 3°7′15″E

La Ferté-Milon
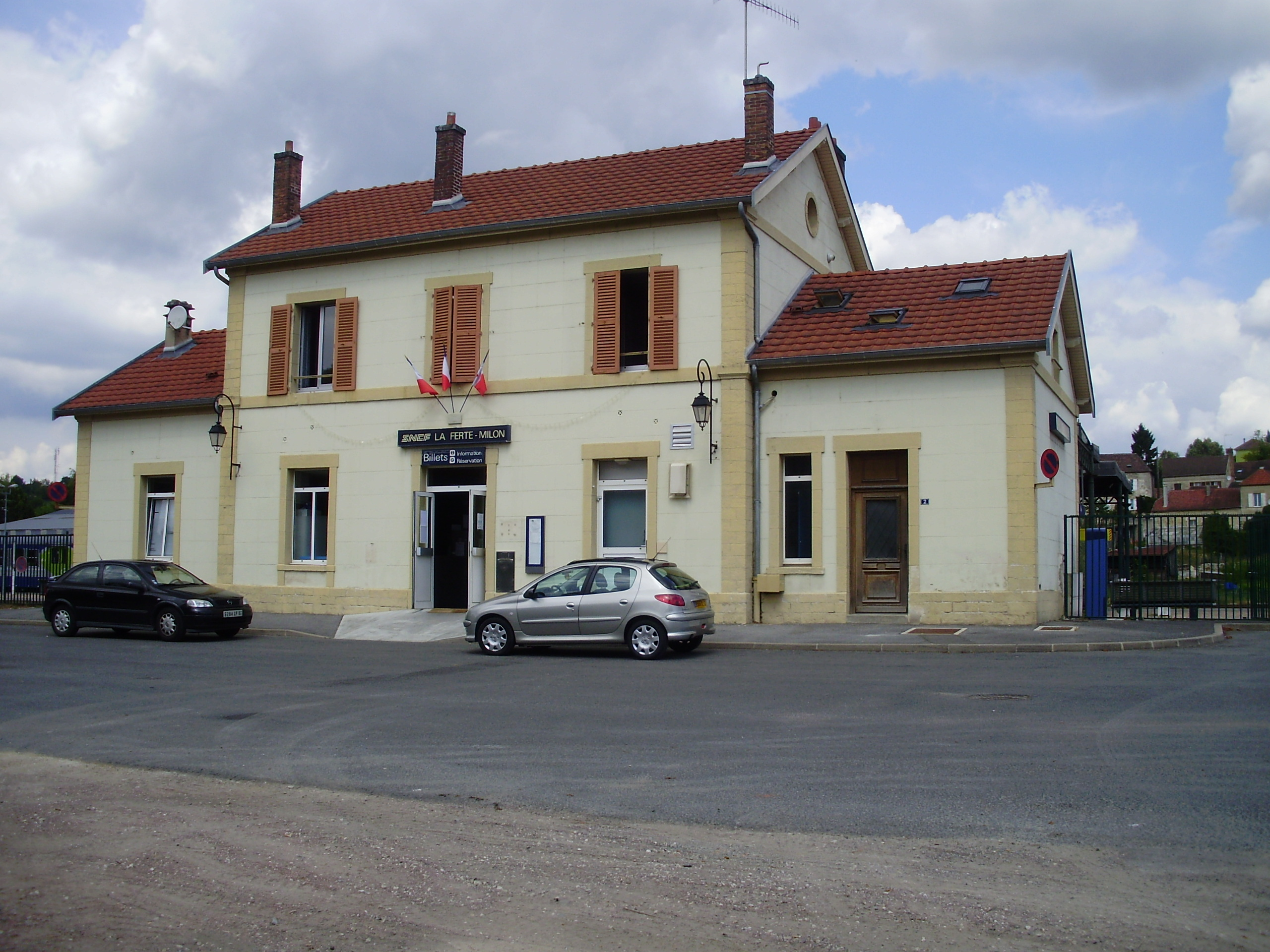

General information
- Location: 02460 La Ferté-Milon; Aisne; France
- Elevation: 69 m (226 ft)
- Owner: SNCF
- Operator: SNCF
- Lines: Trilport-Bazoches railway Rethondes-La Ferté-Milon railway
- Platforms: 2
- Tracks: 3 (+ service tracks)

Construction
- Accessible: No

Other information
- Station code: 87116673
- Fare zone: Île-de-France zone fares not applicable

History
- Opened: 21 November 1885

Passengers
- 2018: 97,098

Services
Preceding station	Transilien	Following station
Mareuil-sur-Ourcq towards Paris-Est	Line P	Terminus
Location

La Ferté-Milon station (French: Gare de La Ferté-Milon) is a railway station serving La Ferté-Milon, Aisne department, in northern France. It is situated on the line from Paris-Est to Reims.

== History ==
Since 3 April 2016, the railway link between La Ferté-Milon and Fismes has been operated by a replacement bus services. SNCF justified their decision based on the high costs of renovating the line. In 2018, SNCF estimated that the station saw 97,098 Transilien passengers.
