= Château-Thierry station =

Railway station in Château-Thierry, France

Coordinates: 49°2′17″N 3°24′34″E

Château-Thierry
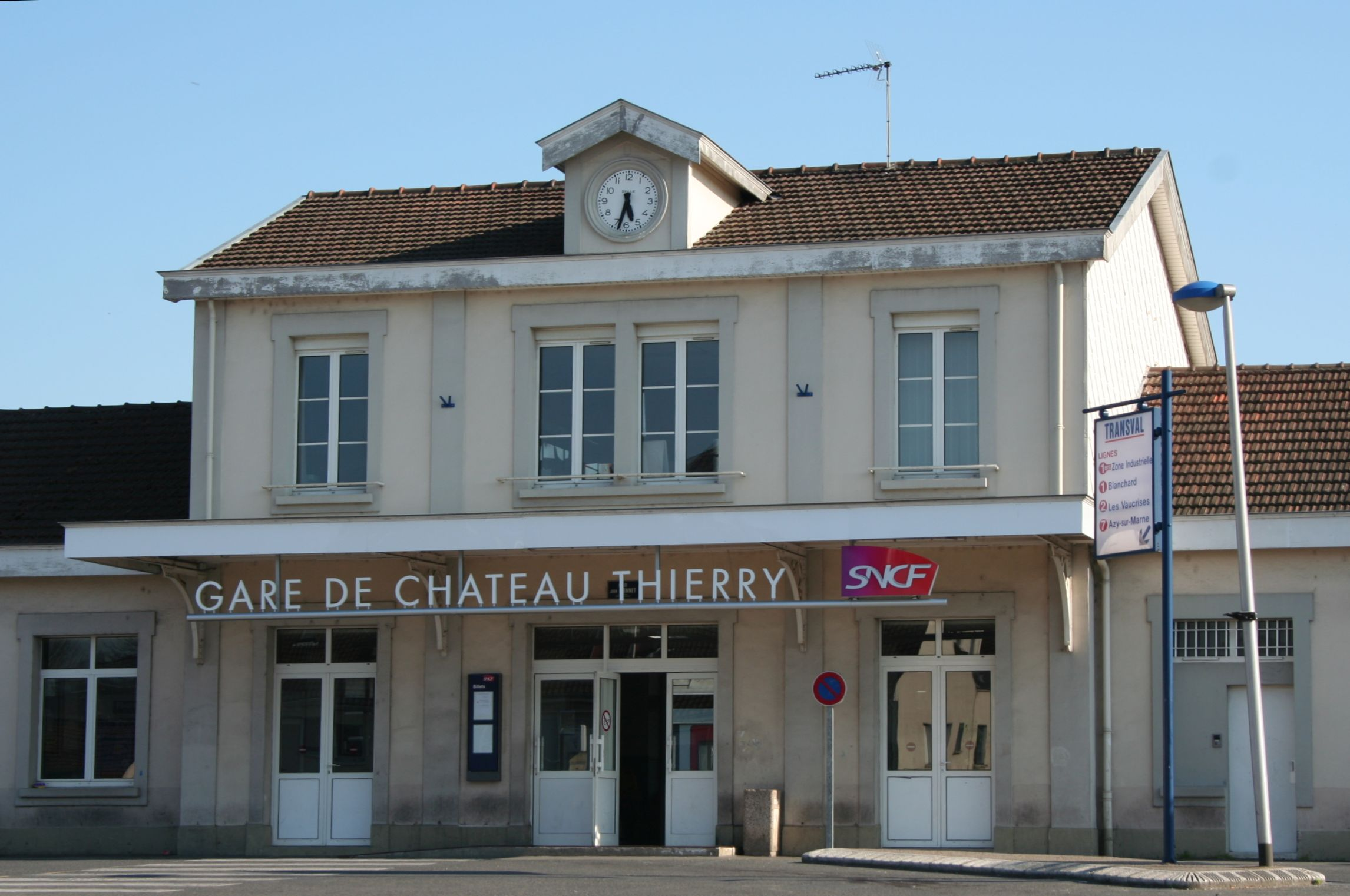

General information
- Location: Place Jean-Monnet; 02400 Château-Thierry; Aisne, France
- Owner: SNCF
- Operator: SNCF

Other information
- Station code: 87116582

Passengers
- 2024: 2,021,333

Services
Preceding station	Transilien	Following station
Chézy-sur-Marne towards Paris-Est	Line P	Terminus
Preceding station	TER Grand Est	Following station
La Ferté-sous-Jouarre towards Paris-Est	C02	Dormans towards Strasbourg or Saint-Dizier
Location

Château-Thierry (French: Gare de Château-Thierry) is a railway station serving Château-Thierry, Aisne department, northern France. It is situated on the Paris–Strasbourg railway between Paris-Est and Épernay.

== Gallery ==
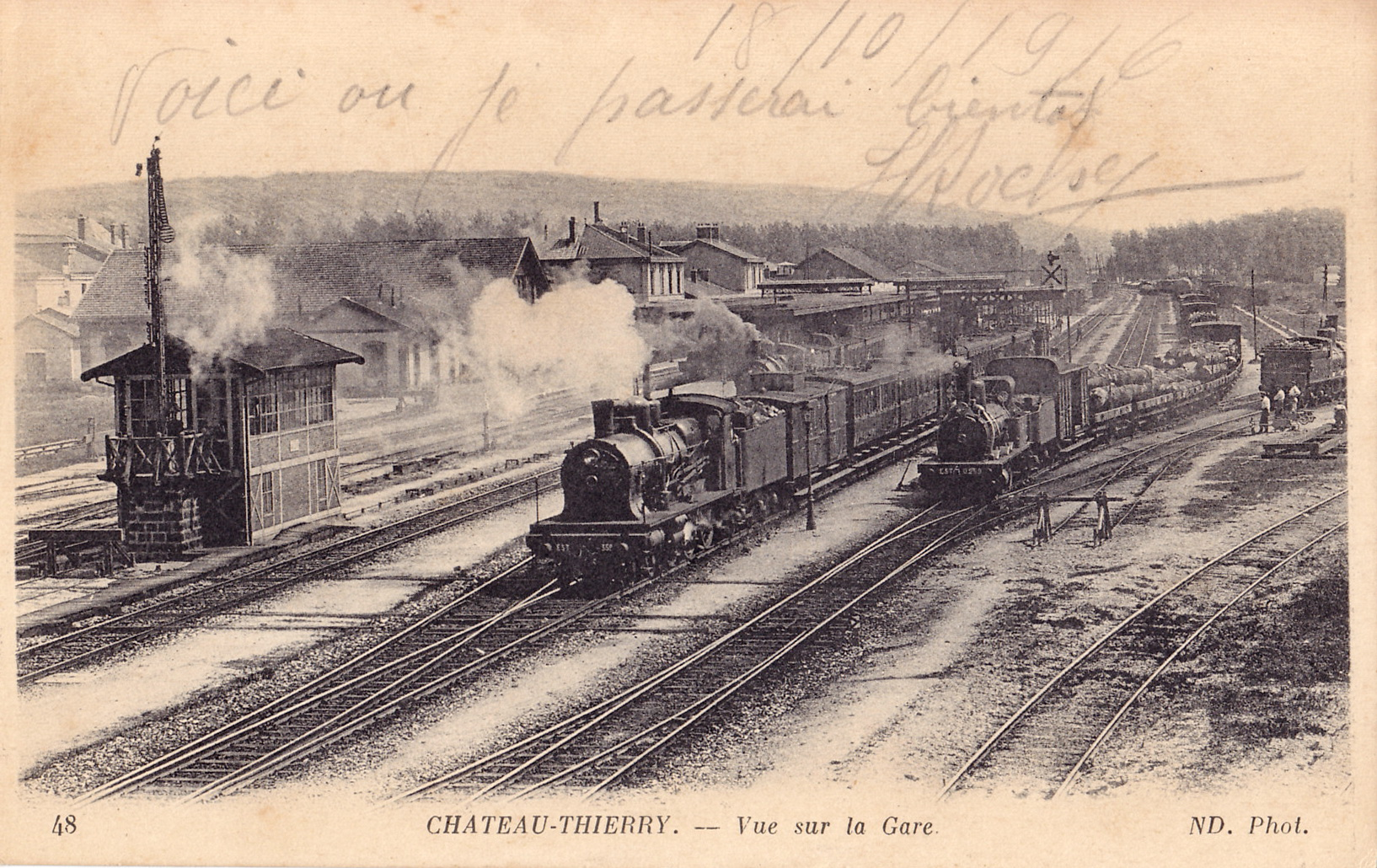
View of the station, pre-1916.

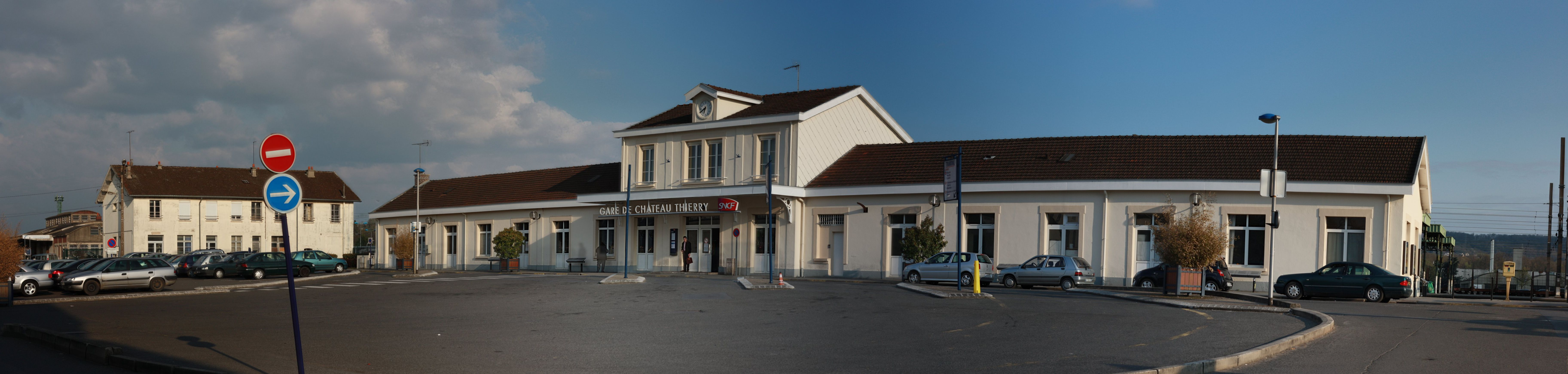
Panoramic view of the station.

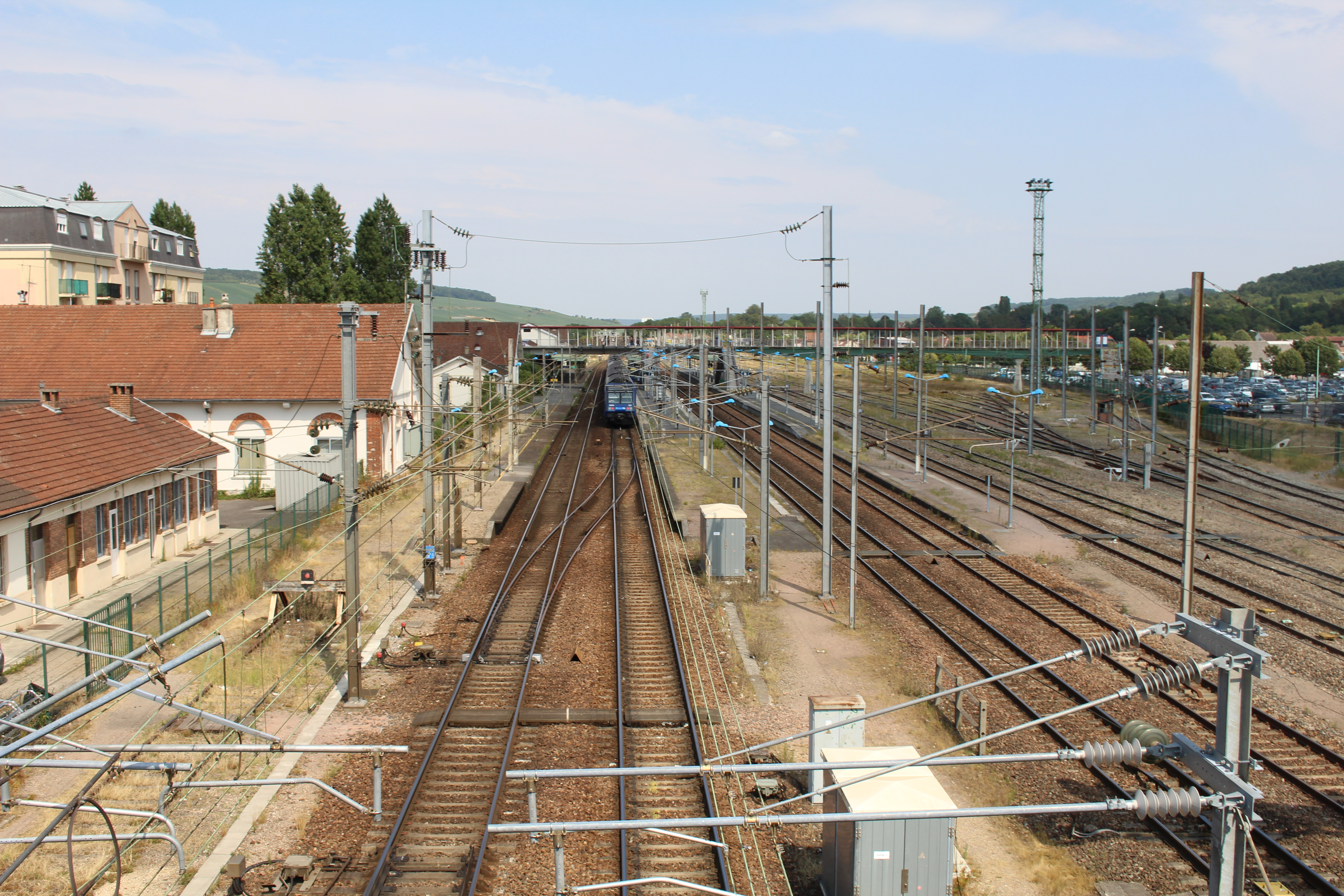
View of the station, looking east.

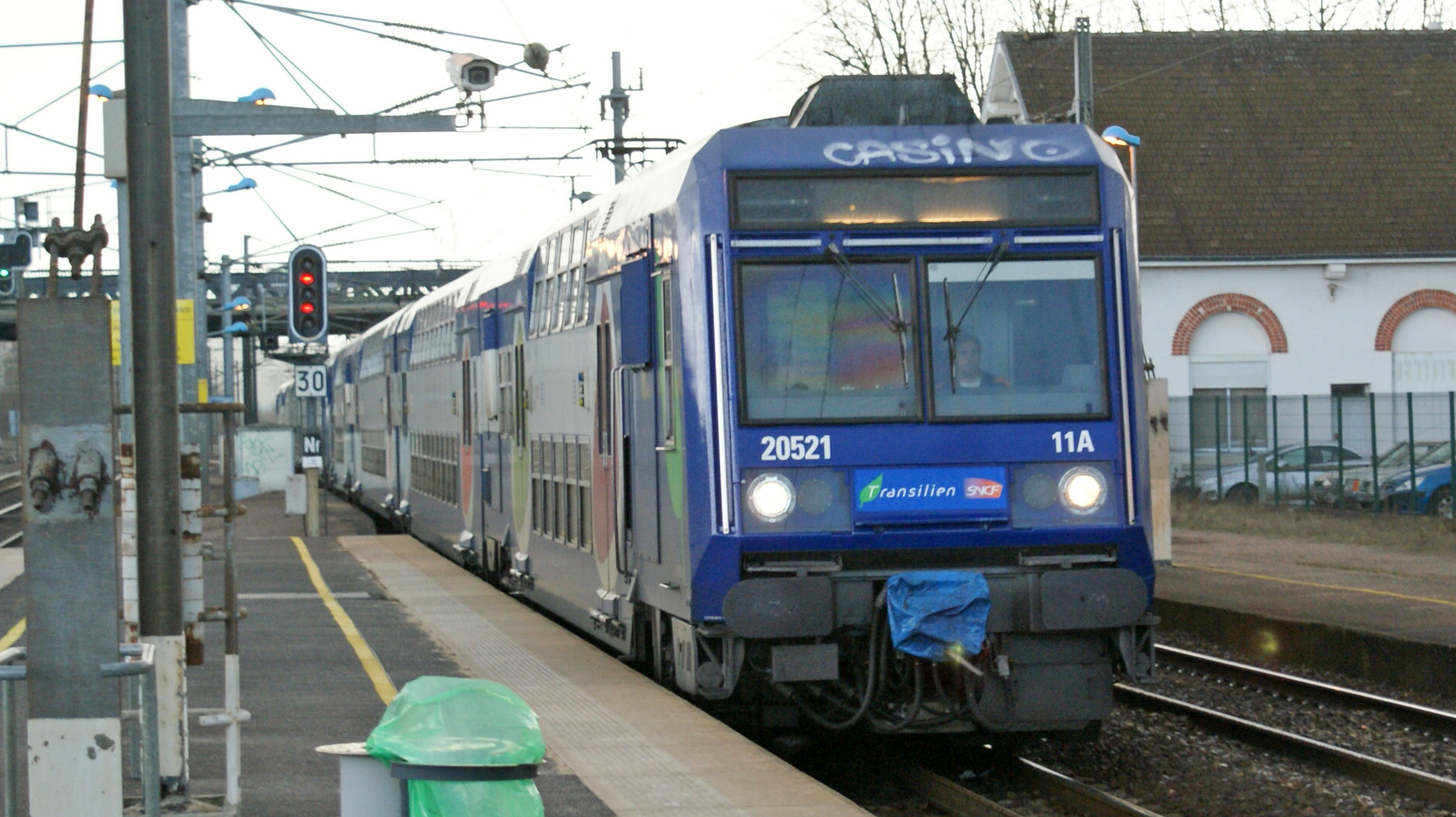
Transilien service from Paris.

== See also ==
- List of SNCF stations in Hauts-de-France
