= Verneuil-l'Étang =

- Commune
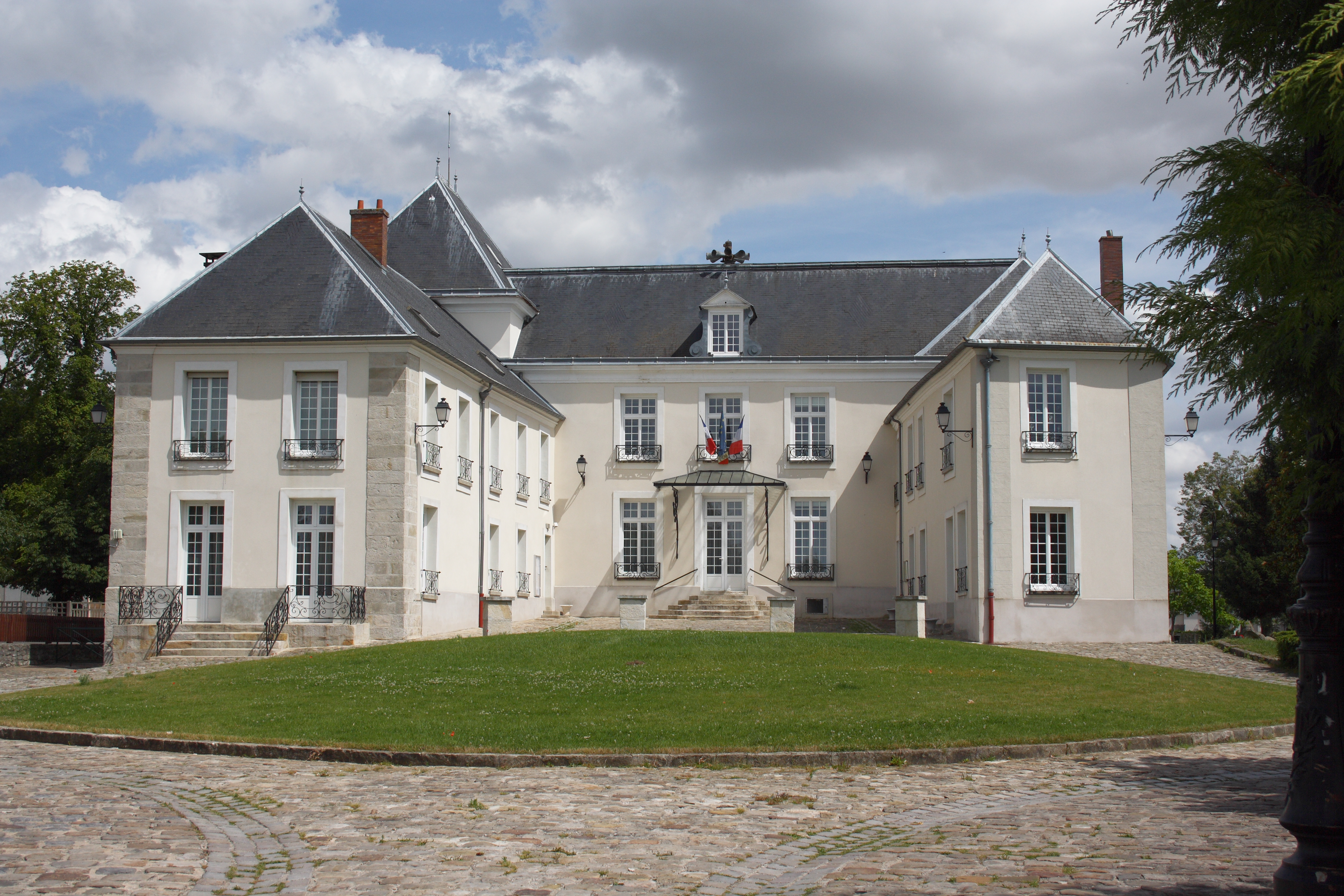
- The town hall in Verneuil-l'Étang
- Location of Verneuil-l'Étang
- Location within France Location within Île-de-France (region)
- Coordinates: 48°38′40″N 2°49′58″E
- Country: France
- Region: Île-de-France
- Department: Seine-et-Marne
- Arrondissement: Provins
- Canton: Nangis
- Intercommunality: CC Brie Nangissienne

Government
  - Mayor (2020–2026): Christian Cibier
- Area^{1}: 7.81 km^{2} (3.02 sq mi)
- Highest elevation: 119 m (390 ft)
- Lowest elevation: 77 m (253 ft)
- Population (2023): 3,223
  - Density: 413/km^{2} (1,070/sq mi)
- Time zone: UTC+01:00 (CET)
  - Summer (DST): UTC+02:00 (CEST)
- INSEE/Postal code: 77493 /77390
- ^{1} French Land Register data, which excludes lakes, ponds, glaciers > 1 km^{2} (0.386 sq mi or 247 acres) and river estuaries.

Verneuil-l'Étang (French pronunciation: [vɛʁnœj letɑ̃]) is a commune in the Seine-et-Marne department in the Île-de-France region in north-central France. Verneuil-l'Étang station has rail connections to Provins, Longueville and Paris.

== Population ==
Historical population
Year	Pop.	±% p.a.
1968	1,299	—
1975	1,707	+3.98%
1982	1,948	+1.90%
1990	2,577	+3.56%
1999	3,135	+2.20%
2007	3,058	−0.31%
2012	3,203	+0.93%
2017	3,237	+0.21%
2023	3,223	−0.07%
Source: INSEE

Inhabitants of Verneuil-l'Étang are called Verneuillais in French.

== See also ==
- Communes of the Seine-et-Marne department
