= Coulommiers station =

Railway station in Seine-et-Marne, France

Coulommiers
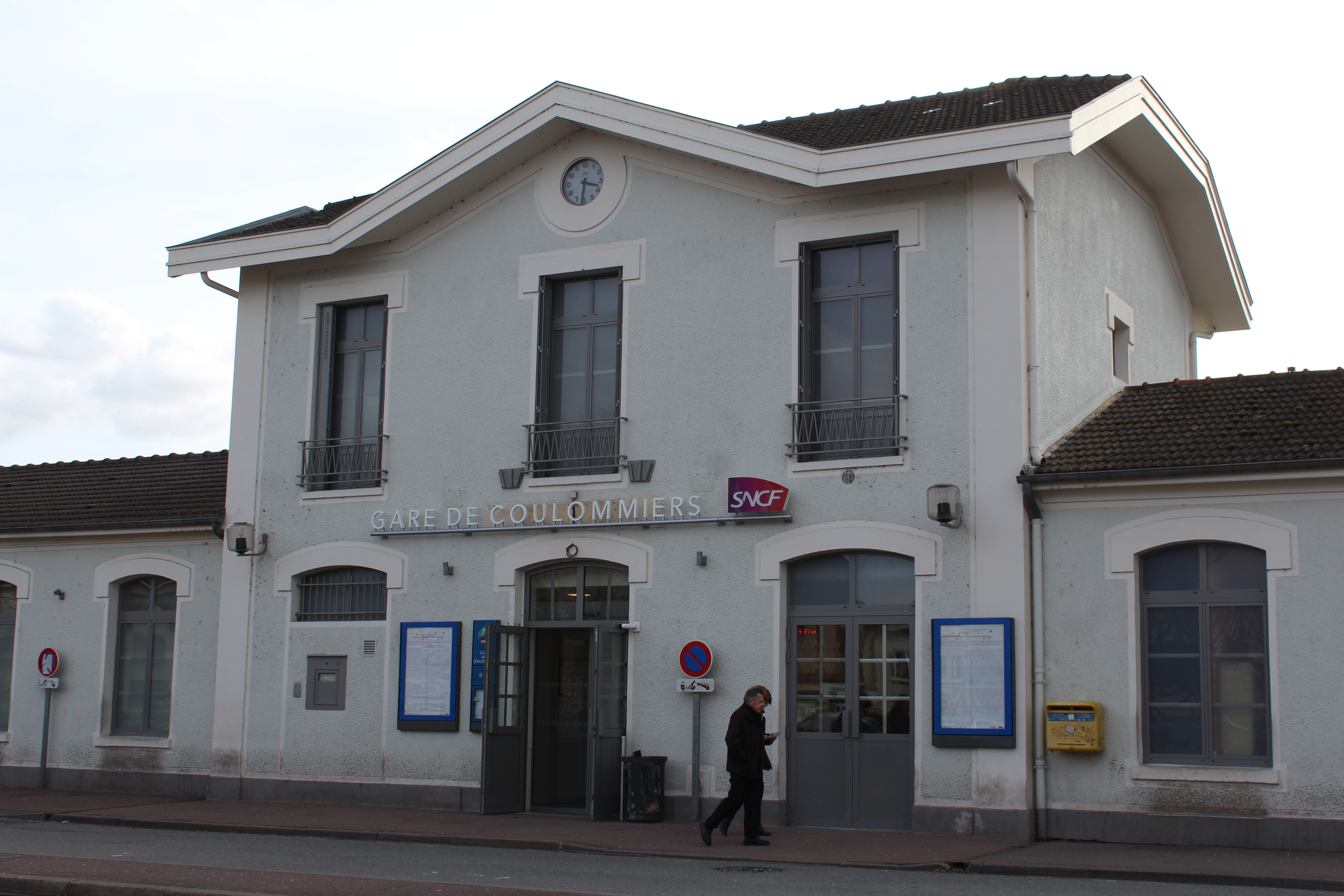

General information
- Location: Place du 8 mai 1945; 77120 Coulommiers; France
- Coordinates: 48.807701°N 3.081554°E
- System: Transilien station
- Owner: SNCF
- Operator: SNCF
- Line: Line P
- Platforms: 2
- Tracks: 2

Other information
- Station code: 87116301
- Fare zone: 5

History
- Opened: 2 April 1863

Passengers
- 2024: 1,132,667

Services
Preceding station	Transilien	Following station
Mouroux towards Paris-Est	Line P	Terminus
Location

Coulommiers is a railway station serving the town Coulommiers, Seine-et-Marne department, northern France. It is the terminus of a branch line from Gretz-Armainvilliers (on the line from Gretz-Armainvilliers to Sézanne) to Coulommiers.

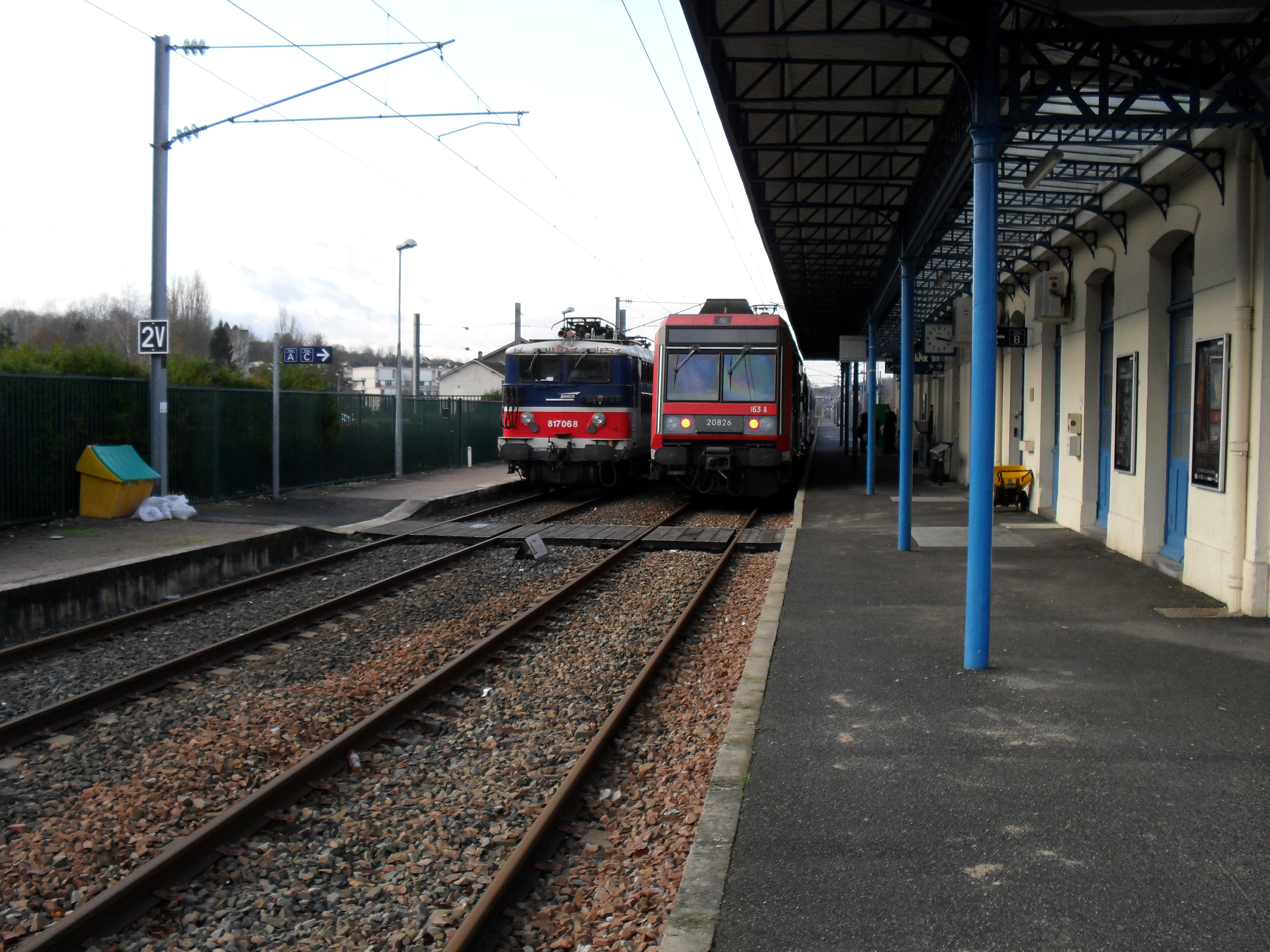
Platforms
