= La Ferté-Milon =

- Commune
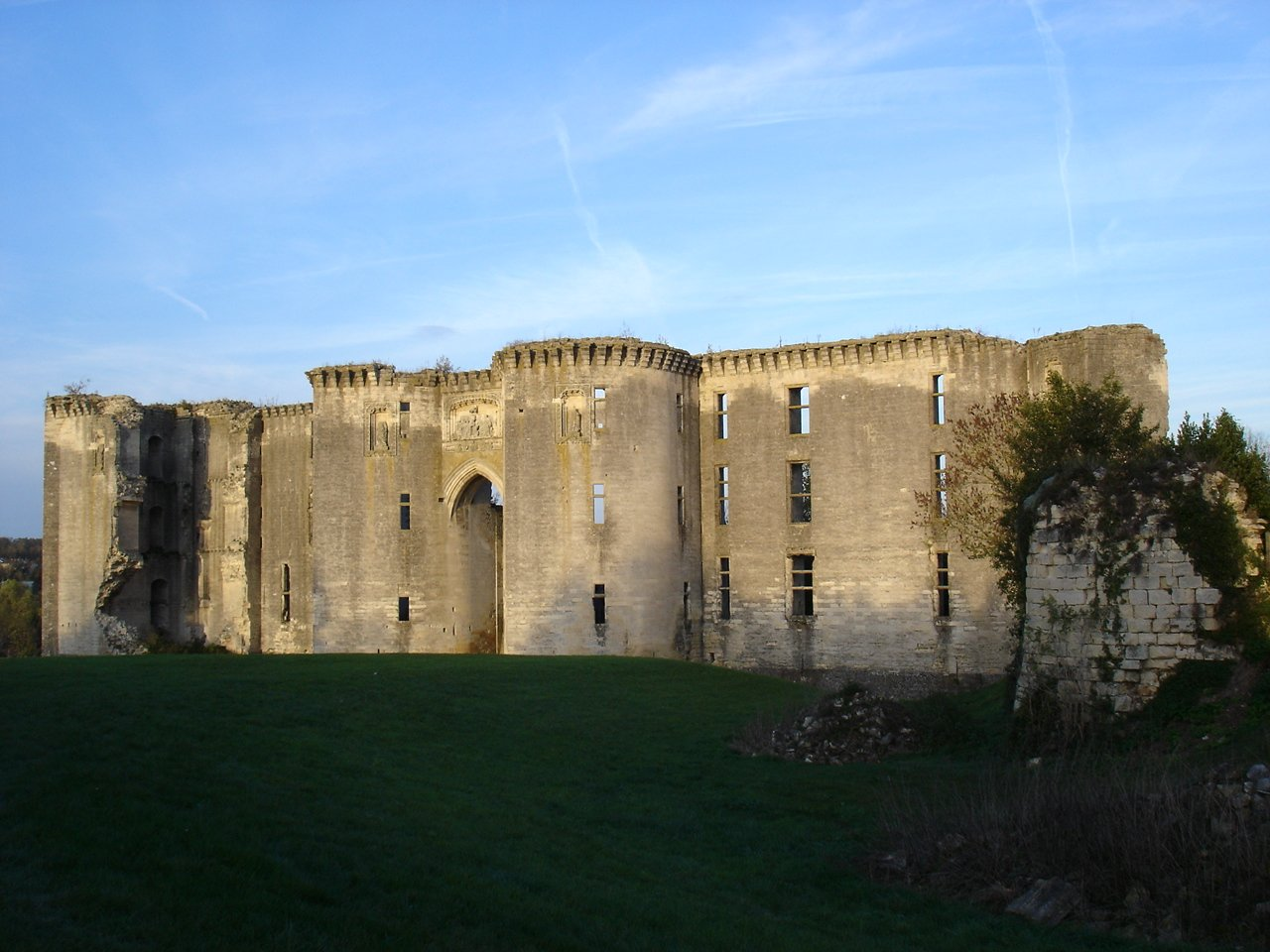
- Chateau

- Coat of arms
- Location of La Ferté-Milon
- Location within France Location within Hauts-de-France
- Coordinates: 49°10′42″N 3°07′26″E
- Country: France
- Region: Hauts-de-France
- Department: Aisne
- Arrondissement: Soissons
- Canton: Villers-Cotterêts

Government
  - Mayor (2026–32): Marc Andrieux
- Area^{1}: 18.35 km^{2} (7.08 sq mi)
- Elevation: 67 m (220 ft)
- Highest elevation: 156 m (512 ft)
- Lowest elevation: 62 m (203 ft)
- Population (2023): 2,027
  - Density: 110.5/km^{2} (286.1/sq mi)
- Time zone: UTC+01:00 (CET)
  - Summer (DST): UTC+02:00 (CEST)
- INSEE/Postal code: 02307 /02460
- ^{1} French Land Register data, which excludes lakes, ponds, glaciers > 1 km^{2} (0.386 sq mi or 247 acres) and river estuaries.

La Ferté-Milon (French pronunciation: [la fɛʁte milɔ̃]) is a commune in the Aisne department in Hauts-de-France, northern France.

== Geography ==
La Ferté-Milon is situated on the river Ourcq, 27 km southwest of Soissons and 30 km northeast of Meaux. La Ferté-Milon station has rail connections to Meaux and Paris.

== Sights ==
In La Ferté-Milon stand the ruins of an unfinished castle, whose façade was 200 m long and 38 m high. The singular form of the tower walls was probably designed to resist cannons and protect the gate. The façade is preceded by a moat. On the right is a square tower of which two bare walls remain. The top of the ramparts is adorned with machicolation. Access to the town was protected by a former gate of which two towers remain.

Behind the ramparts, two 160 mm cannons from 1909 sit facing towards the valley. One is annotated in Russian with the number 5085.

== Population ==
Historical population
Year	Pop.	±% p.a.
1968	1,629	—
1975	1,695	+0.57%
1982	1,948	+2.01%
1990	2,208	+1.58%
1999	2,109	−0.51%
2007	2,300	+1.09%
2012	2,199	−0.89%
2017	2,085	−1.06%
2023	2,027	−0.47%
Source: INSEE

== Personalities ==
The dramatist Jean Racine (1639–1699) was born in La Ferté-Milon. He was one of the three great playwrights of 17th-century France.

A statue of Racine as a child is located at the bottom of the paved Ruelle des rats. Nearby is a slate-roofed church with a square belfry with four turrets in each corner, one of which serves as a staircase.

== See also ==
- Communes of the Aisne department
- List of medieval bridges in France
