= Transilien Line P =

Suburban rail service around Paris

Line P

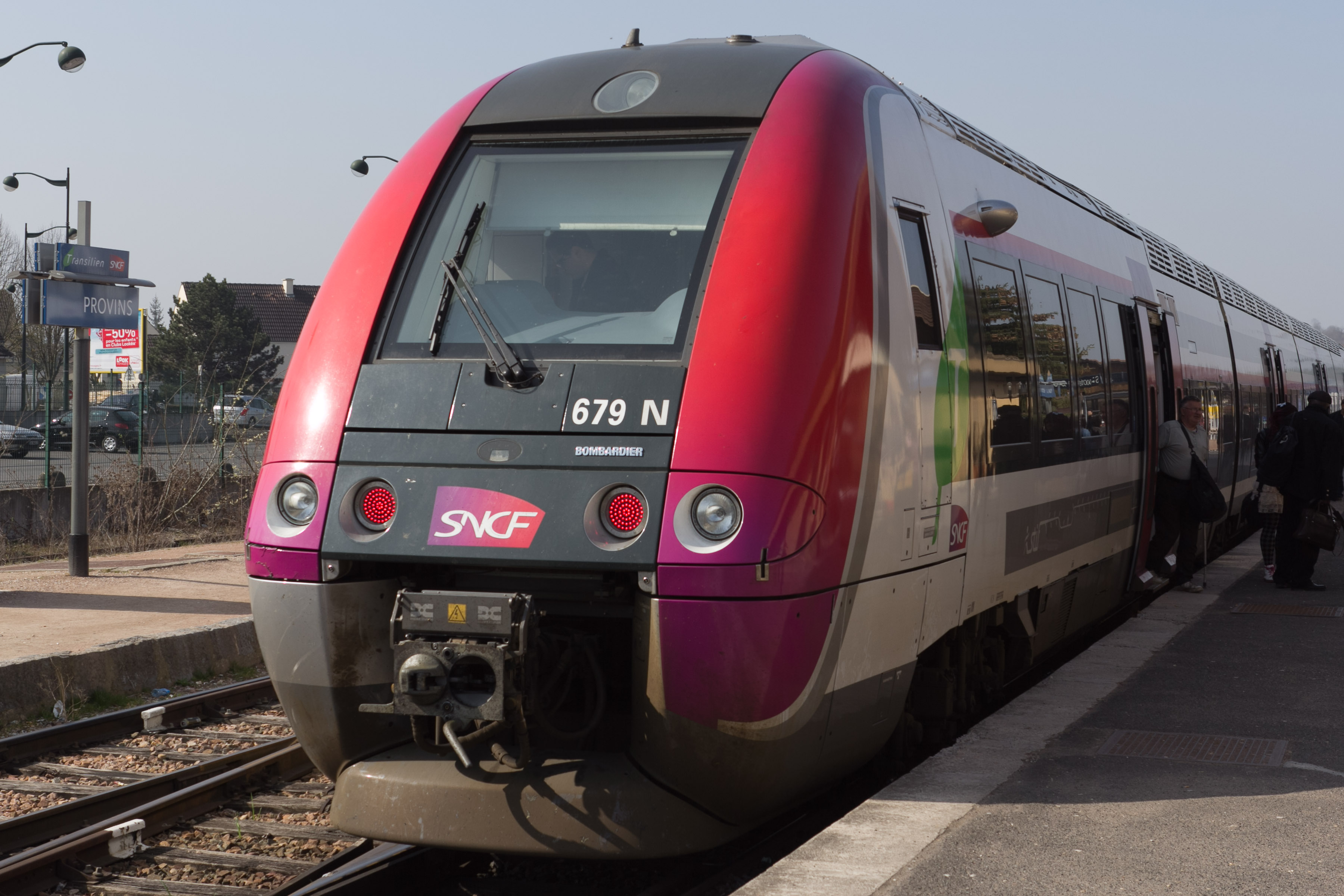
- A B 82500 train operating on Transilien Line P at Provins.

Overview
- Termini: Paris-Est; Coulommiers Provins La Ferté-Milon Château-Thierry
- Stations: 32

Service
- Type: Commuter rail
- System: Transilien
- Operator: SNCF
- Depot: Noisy-le-Sec
- Rolling stock: B 82500, Z 20500, Z 50000

History
- Opened: 3 January 1849

Technical
- Line length: 242 km (150 mi)
- Track gauge: 1,435 mm (4 ft 8 1/2 in) standard gauge
Route map

Transilien Line P is a railway line of the Paris Transilien suburban rail network. The trains on this line travel between Gare de l'Est in central Paris and the east of Île-de-France region. Transilien services from Paris-Est are part of the SNCF Gare de l'Est rail network. They have a total of 83,000 passengers per weekday.

The first sections of the Paris-Est network opened on 3 January 1849, they were reorganized into Transilien Line P on 31 December 2004.

Translilien Line P formerly included a branch from Esbly to Crécy-la-Chapelle, operated as a self-contained service with tram-train vehicles. In 2025, this branch was administratively separated from Line P and rebranded as tramway line T14.

== Stations served ==
=== Meaux line ===
- Paris-Est
- Chelles–Gournay station
- Vaires–Torcy station
- Lagny–Thorigny station
- Esbly station
- Meaux station

=== Château-Thierry line ===
- Paris-Est
- Meaux station
- Trilport station
- Changis-Saint-Jean station
- La Ferté-sous-Jouarre station
- Nanteuil–Saâcy station
- Nogent-l'Artaud–Charly station
- Chézy-sur-Marne station
- Château-Thierry station

=== La Ferté-Milon line ===
- Paris-Est
- Meaux station
- Trilport station
- Isles–Armentières–Congis station
- Lizy-sur-Ourcq station
- Crouy-sur-Ourcq station
- Mareuil-sur-Ourcq station
- La Ferté-Milon station

=== Coulommiers line ===
- Paris-Est
- Tournan station
- Marles-en-Brie station
- Mortcerf station
- Guérard–La Celle-sur-Morin station
- Faremoutiers–Pommeuse station
- Mouroux station
- Coulommiers station

=== Provins line ===
- Paris-Est
- Verneuil-l'Étang station
- Mormant station
- Nangis station
- Longueville station
- Sainte-Colombe–Septveilles station
- Champbenoist–Poigny station
- Provins station

== Services ==
Line P is operated by the five following services:

- Paris-Est – Meaux
- Paris-Est – Meaux – Château-Thierry
- Paris-Est – Meaux – La Ferté-Milon
- Paris-Est – Coulommiers
- Paris-Est – Provins

Line P uses a four-letter mission coding system. Only in the section between Paris-Est and Chateau-Thierry the trains display the mission code; otherwise they only appear on passenger information display systems and on timetables.

Line P mission code structure
First letter (destination)	Second letter (type of service)	Third letter (station of origin or serviced stops)	Fourth letter (axis)
C = Coulommiers; F = La Ferté-Milon; M = Meaux; P = Paris-Est; X = Provins; Z = Château-Thierry	I = Express; Express between Paris-Est and Chelles-Gournay (for services to Meaux); Express between Paris-Est and Meaux (for services to Château-Thierry); Express between Paris-Est and Tournan (for services to Coulommiers); Express between Paris-Est and Verneuil-l'Étang (for services to Provins); O = All stops	If the second letter is an 'O': C = Coulommiers; F = La Ferté-Milon; M = Meaux; P = Paris-Est; X = Provins; Z = Château-Thierry; If the second letter is an 'I': B = All stops from Verneuil l’Etang; C = All stops from Chelles – Gournay; L = All stops from Lagny-Thorigny; L = All stops from Lizy-sur-Ourcq; M = All stops from Meaux; T = All stops from Tournan	I = Paris – Meaux; O = Paris – Château-Thierry / La Ferté-Milon; U = Paris – Provins / Coulommiers

Table of mission codes as of 2026
Destination	Mission codes
Coulommiers	CITU
La Ferté-Milon	FIMO, FOMO
Meaux	MICI, MOFO
Paris-Est	PIBU, PICI, PIMO, PITU
Provins	XIBU
Château-Thierry	ZIMO

== Rolling stock ==
=== Current fleet ===
Type	Image	Type	Top speed		Number	Cars	Routes operated
Type	Image	Type	mph	km/h	Number	Cars	Routes operated
B 82500		DEMU	100	160	26	4	Paris-Est – La Ferté Milon; Meaux – La Ferté Milon
Z 20500		EMU	86	140	21	4	Paris-Est – Château-Thierry; Paris-Est – Meaux
Z 50000		EMU	86	140	63 (shared pool)	8	Paris-Est – Meaux; Paris-Est – Coulommiers; Paris-Est – Provins

=== Past fleet ===
Type	Image	Type	Top speed		Cars	Routes operated
Type	Image	Type	mph	km/h	Cars	Routes operated
BB 67400		Diesel locomotive	86	140	–	Paris-Est – La Ferté Milon (coupled with the RIB Cars)
BB 17000		Electric locomotive	86	140	–	Paris-Est – Meaux (coupled with the RIB Cars); Paris-Est – Coulommiers (coupled with the RIB Cars)
RIB		Commuter car	86	140	4	Paris-Est – Meaux (coupled with the BB 17000); Paris-Est – Coulommiers (coupled with the BB 17000); Paris-Est – La Ferté Milon (coupled with the BB 67000)
U 25500		Tram train	62	100	5 articulated sections	Esbly – Crécy la Chapelle
U 56600		Tram train	62	100	5 articulated sections	Esbly – Crécy la Chapelle

== See also ==
- List of Transilien stations
