= Sainte-Colombe, Seine-et-Marne =

Sainte-Colombe
- Commune
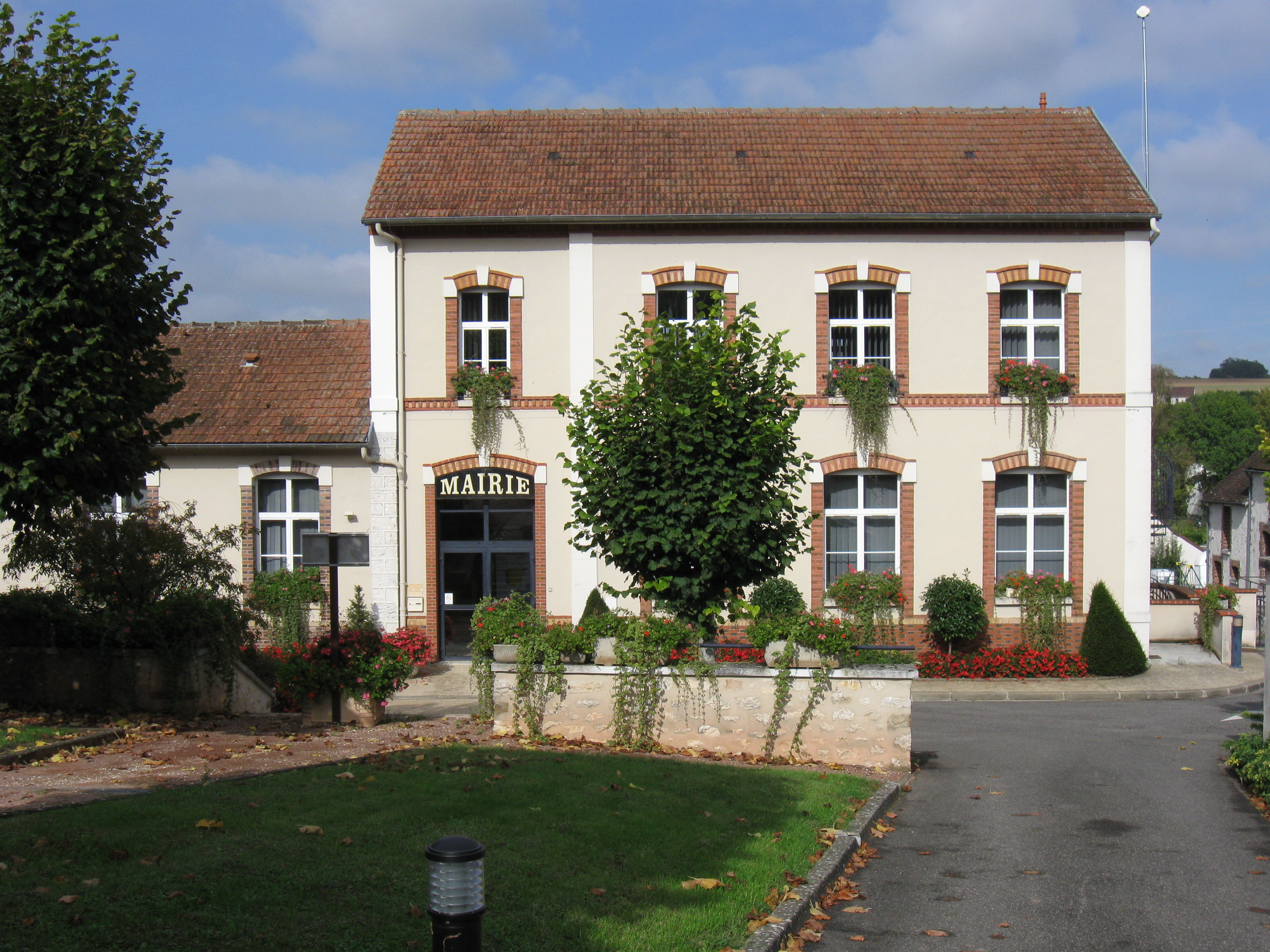
- The town hall in Sainte-Colombe

- Coat of arms
- Location of Sainte-Colombe
- Location within France Location within Île-de-France (region)
- Coordinates: 48°32′11″N 3°15′49″E
- Country: France
- Region: Île-de-France
- Department: Seine-et-Marne
- Arrondissement: Provins
- Canton: Provins
- Intercommunality: Provinois

Government
  - Mayor (2020–2026): Alain Balducci
- Area^{1}: 8.16 km^{2} (3.15 sq mi)
- Highest elevation: 153 m (502 ft)
- Lowest elevation: 71 m (233 ft)
- Population (2023): 1,781
  - Density: 218/km^{2} (565/sq mi)
- Time zone: UTC+01:00 (CET)
  - Summer (DST): UTC+02:00 (CEST)
- INSEE/Postal code: 77404 /77650
- ^{1} French Land Register data, which excludes lakes, ponds, glaciers > 1 km^{2} (0.386 sq mi or 247 acres) and river estuaries.

Sainte-Colombe (French pronunciation: [sɛ̃t kɔlɔ̃b]) is a commune in the Seine-et-Marne department in the Île-de-France region in north-central France. Sainte-Colombe–Septveilles station has rail connections to Provins, Longueville and Paris.

== Demographics ==
Inhabitants of Sainte-Colombe are called Saint-Colombinois.

== See also ==
- Communes of the Seine-et-Marne department
