= Gare de l'Est =

Terminal railway station in Paris, France

Paris-Est
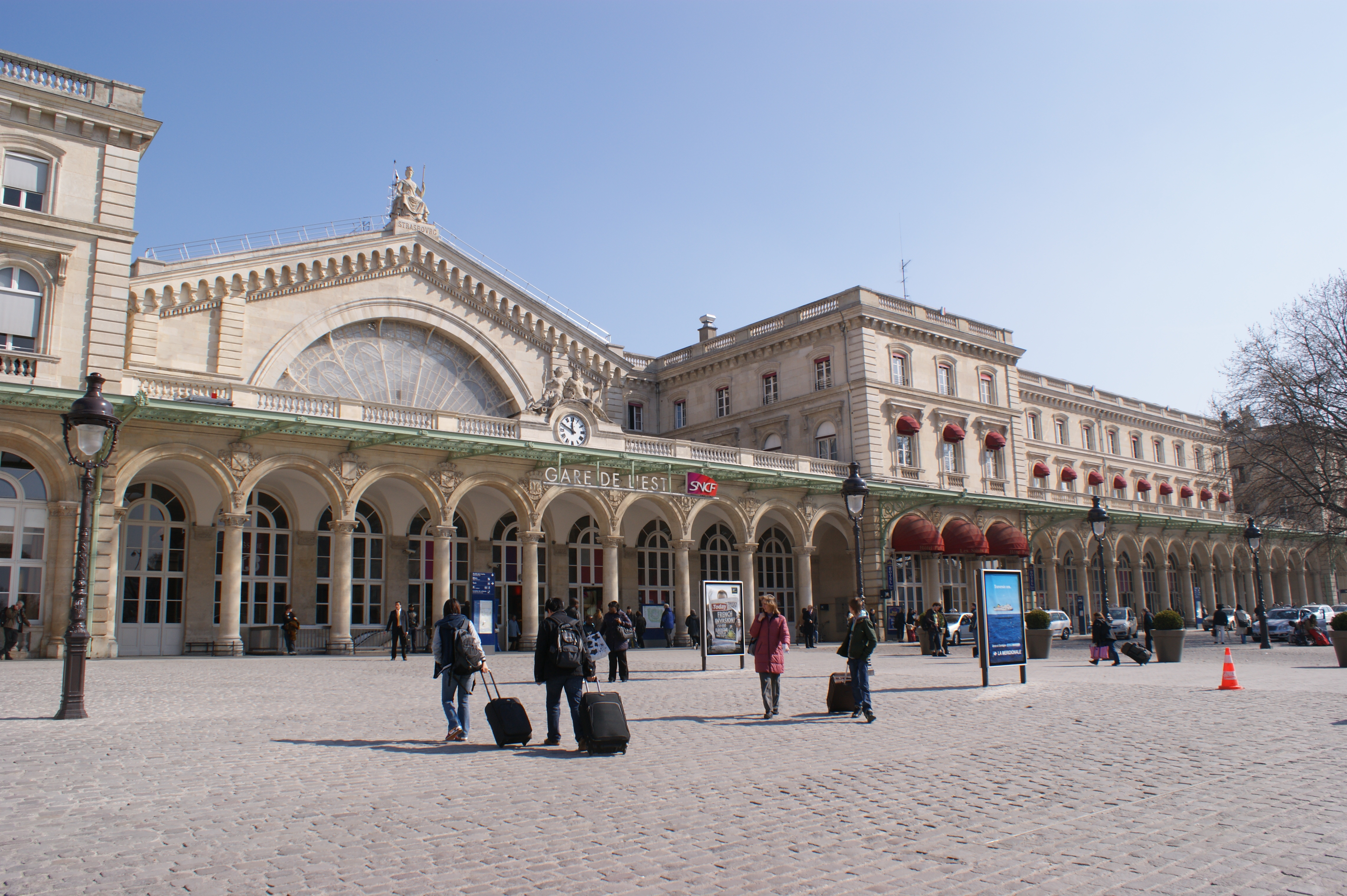
- Main entrance

General information
- Location: Place du 11 Novembre 1918; Paris; France
- Coordinates: 48°52′37″N 2°21′33″E
- Operator: SNCF
- Lines: Paris–Strasbourg railway; Paris–Mulhouse railway
- Tracks: 30
- Connections: at Métro station; RATP Bus: 31 32 35 38 39 46 54 56 91; Noctilien: N01 N02 N13 N14 N41 N42 N43 N44 N45 N140 N141 N143

Construction
- Structure type: At-grade
- Parking: Yes
- Cycle facilities: Parking station, cycle sharing station
- Accessible: Yes
- Architect: François-Alexandre Duquesney

Other information
- Station code: 87113001
- IATA code: XHP
- Fare zone: 1

History
- Opened: 5 July 1849

Passengers
- 2024: 42,725,621
- Rank: 5th in France
Services
Preceding station	Venice Simplon-Orient-Express	Following station
Calais-Ville towards London Victoria	London–Paris–Rome	Innsbruck towards Rome
Calais-Ville towards London Victoria	Venice–Budapest–London	Vienna Westbahnhof towards Venice
Calais-Ville towards London Victoria	Venice–Prague–London	Frankfurt towards Venice
Terminus	Paris–Istanbul	Budapest Keleti towards Istanbul
Preceding station	DB Fernverkehr	Following station
Forbach towards Frankfurt (Main) Hbf	ICE/TGV 82	Terminus
Terminus	ICE/TGV 83	Strasbourg towards München Hbf
Preceding station	SNCF	Following station
Terminus	TGV inOui	Reims Terminus
Terminus	TGV inOui	Reims towards Sedan
Terminus	TGV inOui	Champagne-Ardenne TGV towards Bar-le-Duc, Nancy-Ville, Remiremont, Saint-Dié-des-Vosges, Metz-Ville, Luxembourg, Strasbourg-Ville or Colmar (Haut-Rhin)
Preceding station	Ouigo	Following station
Terminus	Grande Vitesse	Metz towards Strasbourg
Preceding station	Transilien	Following station
Terminus	Line P	Meaux towards Château-Thierry or La Ferté-Milon
Terminus	Line P	Chelles-Gournay towards Meaux
Terminus	Line P	Tournan towards Coulommiers
Terminus	Line P	Verneuil-l'Étang towards Provins
Preceding station	TER Grand Est	Following station
Terminus	C02	La Ferté-sous-Jouarre towards Strasbourg or Saint-Dizier
Terminus	C04	Longueville towards Mulhouse or Dijon
Connections to other stations
Preceding station	Paris Metro	Following station
Château d'Eau towards Bagneux–Lucie Aubrac	Line 4 transfer at Gare de l'Est	Gare du Nord towards Porte de Clignancourt
Jacques Bonsergent towards Place d'Italie	Line 5 transfer at Gare de l'Est	Gare du Nord towards Bobigny–Pablo Picasso
Poissonnière towards Villejuif–Louis Aragon or Mairie d'Ivry	Line 7 transfer at Gare de l'Est	Château-Landon towards La Courneuve–8 mai 1945
Future services
Preceding station	Transilien	Following station
Terminus	Line P (late 2025)	Villiers–Champigny–Bry towards Coulommiers or Provins
Location

The Gare de l'Est (pronounced [ɡaʁ də lɛst]; English: East station), officially Paris-Est, is one of the seven large mainline railway station termini in Paris, France. It is located in the 10th arrondissement, approximately 270 meters southeast from the Gare du Nord, facing the Boulevard de Strasbourg, part of the north–south axis of Paris created by Georges-Eugène Haussmann.

Opened in 1849, it is currently the fifth-busiest of the six main railway stations in Paris before the Gare d'Austerlitz. The Gare de l'Est is the western terminus of the Paris–Strasbourg railway and Paris–Mulhouse railway which then proceeds to Basel, Switzerland.

== History ==
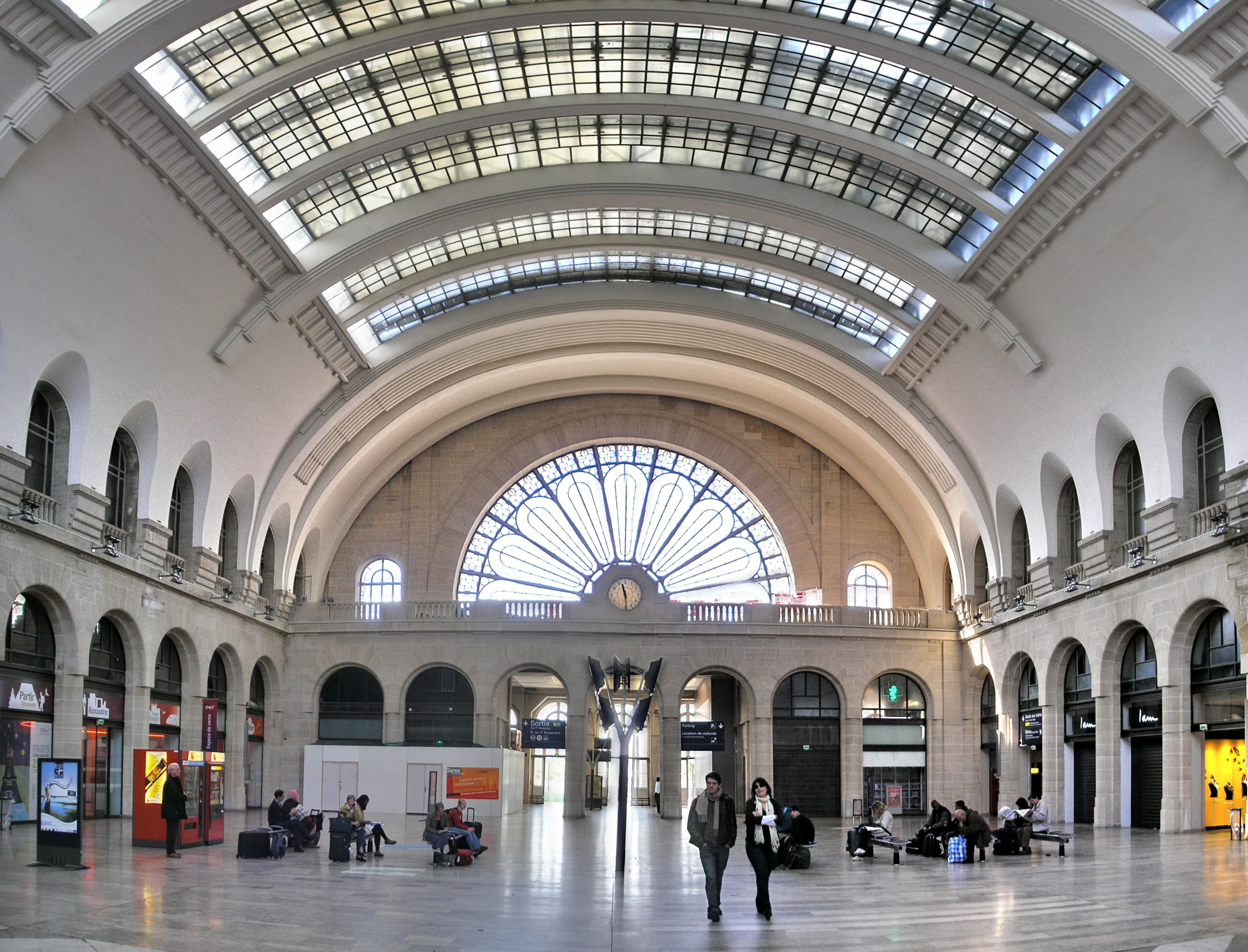
View of the entrance foyer

The Gare de l'Est was opened in 1849 by the Compagnie du Chemin de Fer de Paris à Strasbourg (Paris–Strasbourg Railway Company) under the name "Strasbourg platform" (Embarcadère de Strasbourg); an official inauguration with President Louis Napoléon Bonaparte took place the next year. The platform corresponds today with the hall for main-line trains. Designed by architect François Duquesnay, it was renamed the "Gare de l'Est" in 1854, after the expansion of service to Mulhouse.

Renovations followed in 1885 and 1900, as part of Haussmann's renovation of Paris. In 1931, it was doubled in size, with the new part of the station built symmetrically with the old part. This transformation changed the surrounding neighbourhood significantly. At the top of the west facade of the Gare de l'Est is a statue by the sculptor Philippe Joseph Henri Lemaire, representing the city of Strasbourg, while the east end of the station is crowned by a statue personifying Verdun, by Varenne. These two cities are important destinations serviced by Gare de l'Est. On 4 October 1883, the Gare de l'Est saw the first departure of the Orient Express for Istanbul.

The Gare de l'Est is the terminus of a strategic railway network extending towards the eastern part of France, and it saw large mobilizations of French troops, most notably in 1914, at the beginning of World War I. In the main-line train hall, a monumental painting by Albert Herter, Le Départ des poilus, août 1914 dating from 1926, illustrates the departure of these soldiers for the Western front. The SNCF started LGV Est Européenne services from the Gare de l'Est on 10 June 2007, with TGV and Intercity-Express (ICE) services to Northeastern France, Luxembourg, Southern Germany and Switzerland. Trains are initially planned to run at 320 km/h (198 mph), with the potential to run at 350 km/h (217 mph), cutting travel times by up to 2 hours.

== Train services ==
The following services currently call at Paris-Est:

- High speed services (TGV inOui ) Paris Est – Reims
- High speed services (TGV inOui ) Paris Est – Reims – Charleville-Mézières – Sedan
- High speed services TGV Paris Est – Champagne-Ardenne TGV – Chalons-en-Champagne – Bar-le-Duc
- High speed services TGV Paris Est – (Champagne-Ardenne TGV/Meuse TGV) – Nancy
- High speed services TGV Paris Est – Nancy – Epinal – Remiremont
- High speed services TGV Paris Est – Nancy – Saint-Dié-des-Vosges
- High speed services TGV Paris Est – Nancy – Strasbourg
- High speed services TGV Paris Est – (Meuse TGV) – Metz
- High speed services TGV Paris Est – Metz – Thionville – Luxembourg
- High speed services TGV/ICE Paris Est – Saarbrücken – Kaiserslautern – Mannheim – Frankfurt
- High speed services TGV Paris Est – (Saverne) – Strasbourg
- High speed services TGV Paris Est – Strasbourg – Colmar
- High speed services TGV/ICE Paris Est – Strasbourg – Karlsruhe – Stuttgart
- High speed services TGV/ICE Paris Est – Strasbourg – Karlsruhe – Stuttgart – Ulm – Augsburg – Munich
- High speed services ICE Paris Est – Strasbourg – Karlsruhe – Frankfurt – Berlin
- Regional services TER Grand Est (C2) Paris Est – Chateau-Thierry – Épernay – Chalons-en-Champagne – St Dizier
- Regional services Transilien Paris Est – Meaux – Chateau Thierry
- Regional services Transilien Paris Est – Meaux – La Ferte-Milon
- Regional services Transilien Paris Est – Chelles Gournay – Meaux
- Regional services Transilien Paris Est – Tournan – Coulommiers
- Regional services Transilien Paris Est – Longueville – Provins

== See also ==
- List of Paris railway stations
- List of stations of the Paris RER
- List of stations of the Paris Métro
