= Provins station =

Railway station in Provins, France

Coordinates: 48°33′20″N 3°18′11″E

Provins
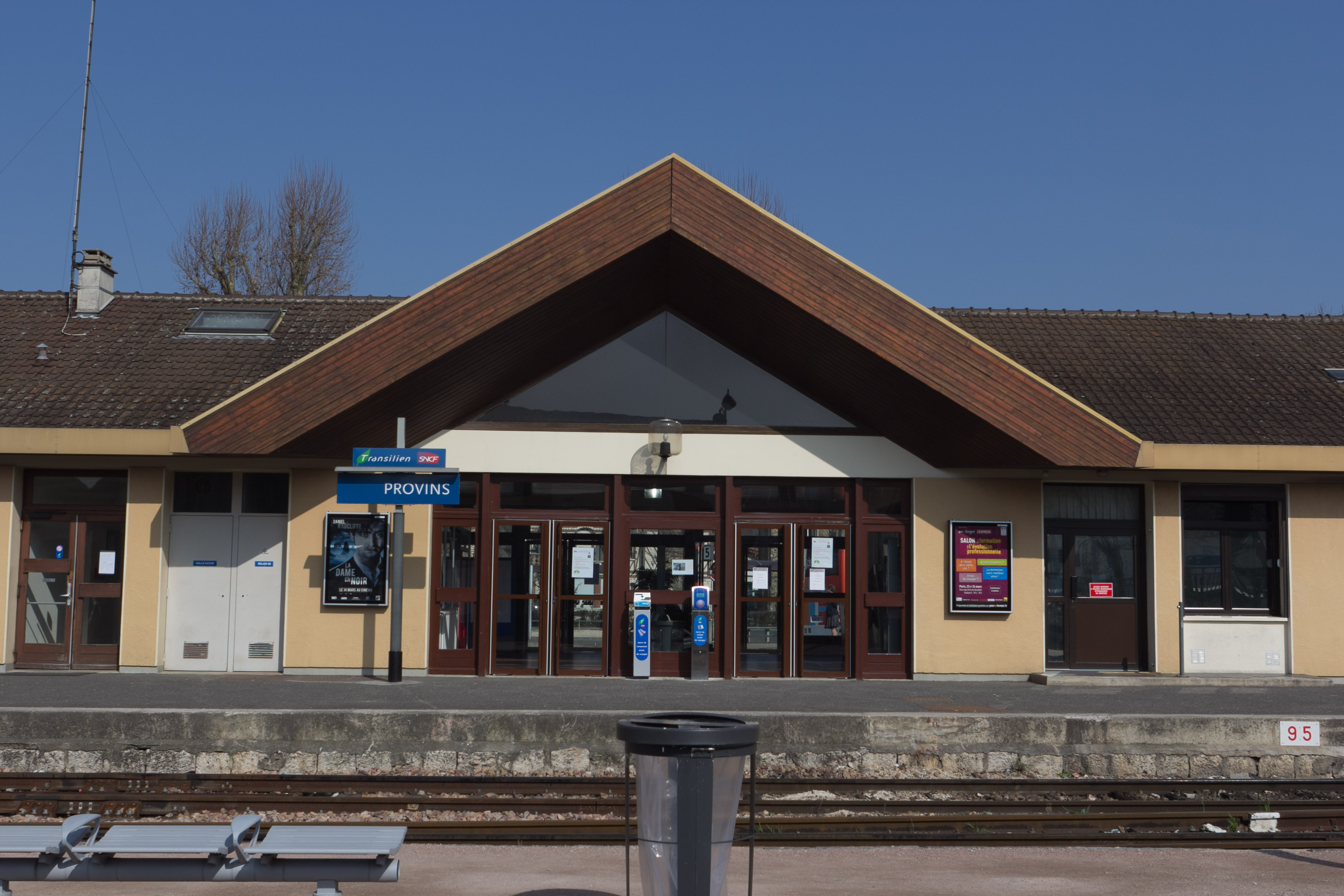
- The passenger building viewed from the stations platforms in 2012.

General information
- Location: Avenue Jean-Jaurès; 77160 Provins; Seine-et-Marne; France
- Owner: SNCF
- Operator: SNCF

Other information
- Station code: 87116160

Passengers
- 2017: 644,123

Services
Preceding station	Transilien	Following station
Champbenoist-Poigny towards Paris-Est	Line P	Terminus
Location

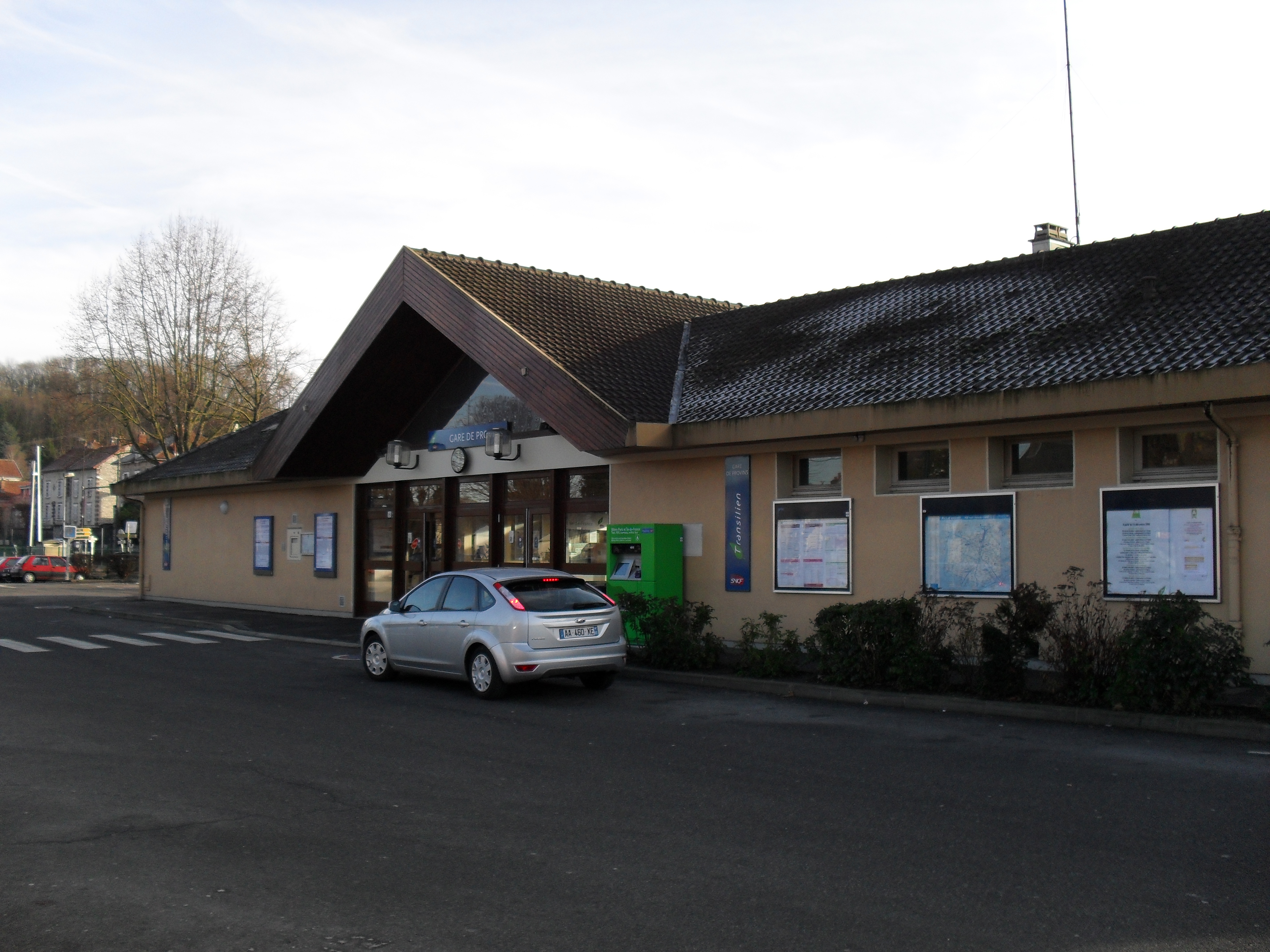
Provins station

Provins station (French: Gare de Provins) is a French railway station located in the commune of Provins, Seine-et-Marne department in the Île-de-France region. The station opened on 11 December 1858 and is located on the Longueville–Esternay railway line. The station is served by TER (local) services operated by SNCF: Transilien line P (Paris–Longueville–Provins).

The section of the railway between Provins and Esternay is closed.

== Gallery ==
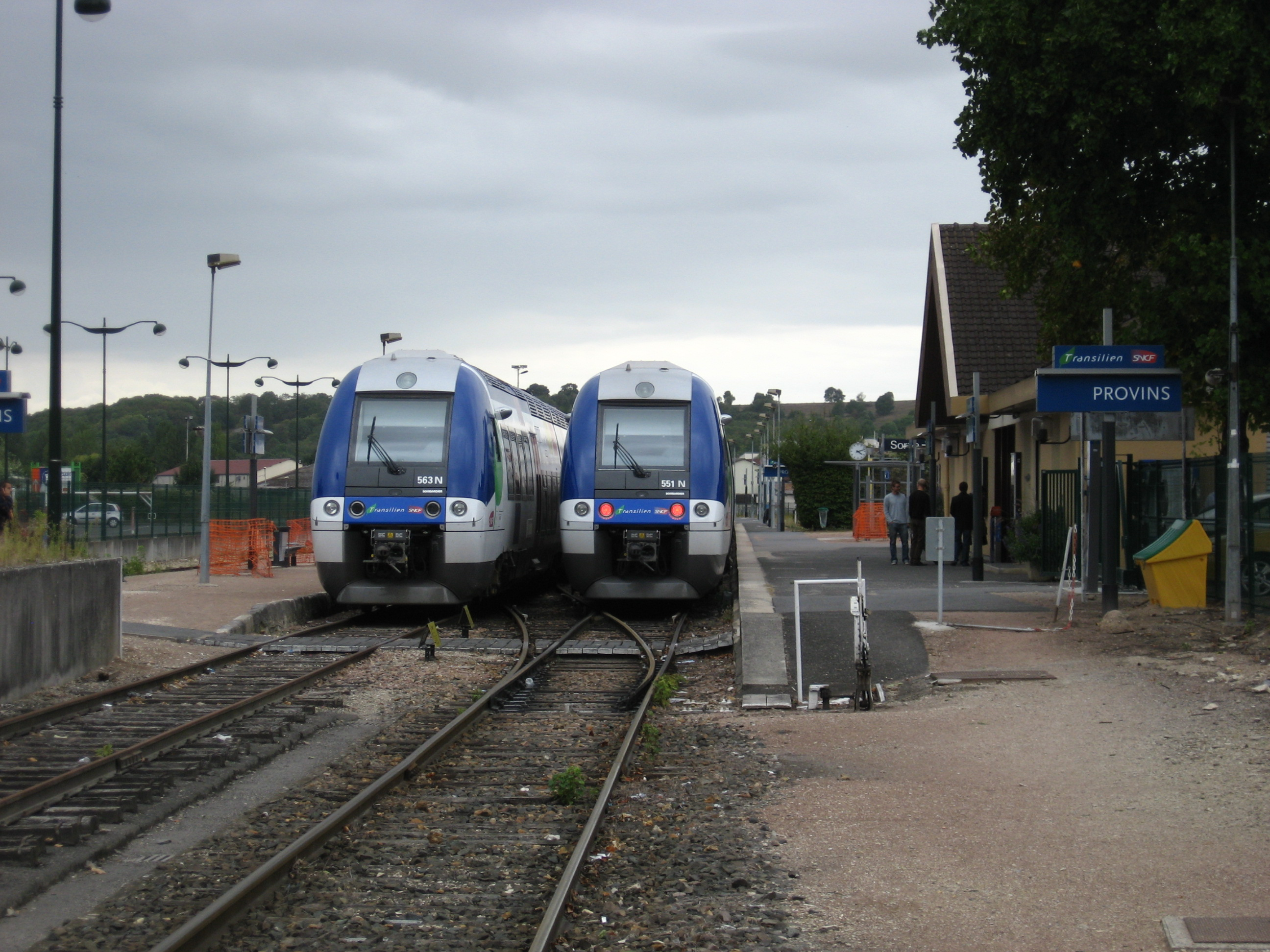
The station with two B82500 waiting in the station

== See also ==
- List of SNCF stations in Île-de-France
- List of Transilien stations
